= Davies Dyke railway station =

Former railway station in Scotland

Davies Dykes Daviesdyke

General information
- Location: Allanton, Lanarkshire; Scotland
- Coordinates: 55.7821°N 3.8261°W
- Grid reference: NS 855 558
- Platforms: 1

Other information
- Status: Disused

History
- Original company: Wilsontown, Morningside and Coltness Railway

Key dates
- 1847: Opened
- April 1848: Closed to passengers
Location

Davies Dyke railway station or Daviesdyke railway station was a station on the Wilsontown, Morningside and Coltness Railway (WM&CR) that served the rural area of Davies Dyke near Allanton in Lanarkshire, Parish of Cambusnethan. The station was located 1 miles 60 chains east of Morningside railway station.

The company at first adopted the standard track gauge for mineral lines of 4 ft 6 in, often referred to as Scotch gauge. The Edinburgh and Glasgow Railway took over the WM&CR in 1849, the track gauge already having been changed in August 1847, from the now almost obsolete 4 ft 6 in to the generally accepted standard gauge of 4 ft 8½ in.

Davies Dyke station may have had just a single short platform however this is not clearly indicated, it was accessed by pedestrians only off the farm lane near the Davies Dyke Farm and the road over bridge.

The station is recorded by the NBR study group as opening on 02/06/1845 and closing in May 1848. Another reference states that Davies Dyke closed permanently in March 1848 under the Edinburgh and Glasgow Railway.

== Services ==
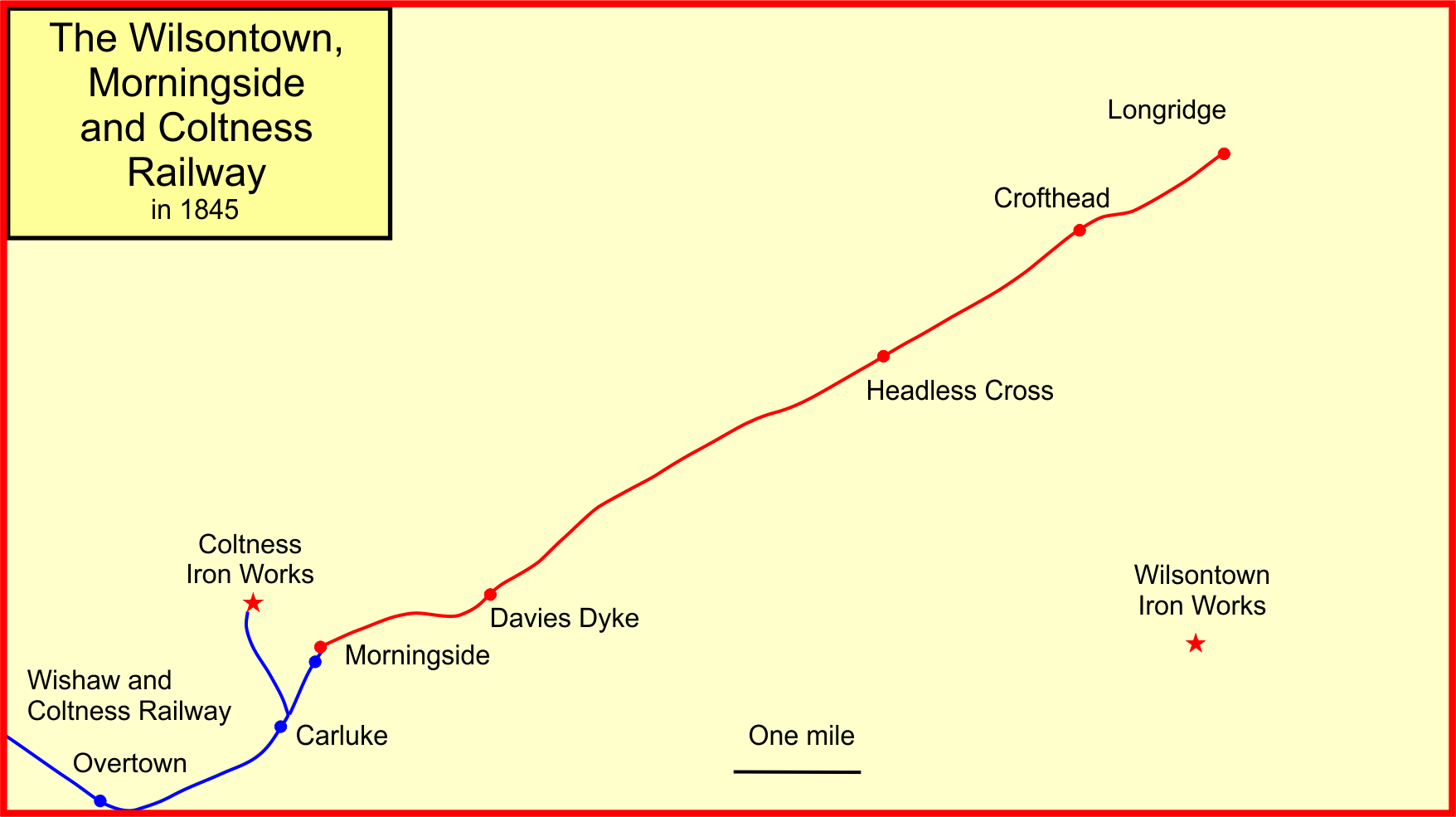
The Wilsontown, Morningside and Coltness Railway in 1845.

The line was worked by steam although the early intention may have been to work the line as a horse drawn waggonway with independent hauliers.

Sporadic passenger services had started from 1845 and a road coach ran between Edinburgh to the original terminus at Longridge from 16 May 1846, passengers disembarking travelling on by train to Townhead. In 1847 two hours was the railway section of the journey, calling at all the stations on the Wilsontown line.

The Caledonian Railway opened its line from Carlisle to Garriongill Junction in 1848 and its trains then ran through to Glasgow over the Wishaw and Coltness Railway. The demands on this abutting line's capacity may have led to the WM&CR passenger service being terminated at this time before being reinstated for a short time a few years later.

The passenger service on the line restarted On 1 October 1864 between Morningside and Bathgate on the 1850 extension, with intermediate stations only however at Blackhall, Crofthead, Bents and Whitburn.

== Station site and infrastructure ==
The WMCR stations had no waiting rooms or shelters. The 1859 OS map shows a siding as this site and an ironstone pit nearby In 1897 the site is marked as Davisdyke Siding with a road entrance, a signal light and three signal posts. The ironstone pit had closed by 1897. In 1941 a mineral line branched off towards Kingshill Colliery and a complex arrangement of sidings, a passing loop and running lines were present on this, the LNER Morningside Branch. A signal box is located at the station site.

In 1910 the North British Railway (NBR) Castle Hill branch's junction was located just to the west and a mineral line ran from it to Chapel Colliery. The Auchter Water runs under the embankment near the site.

Preceding station	Historical railways	Following station
Morningside; Terminus	Wilsontown, Morningside and Coltness; Wilsontown, Morningside and Coltness line	Blackhall; Towards Longridge
