= Morningside, North Lanarkshire =

Coordinates: 55°46′41″N 3°52′02″W

Morningside
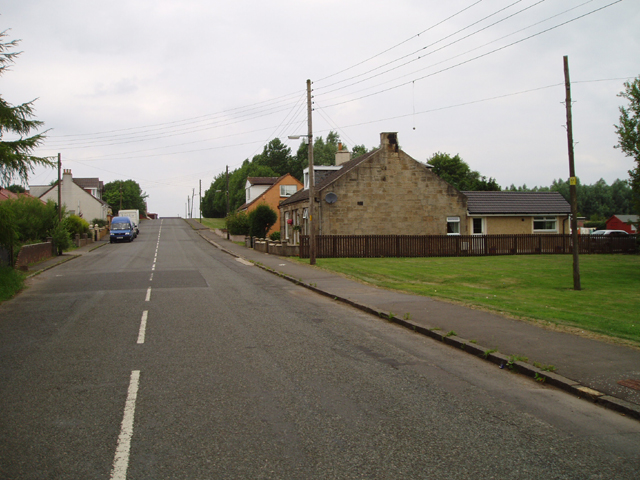
- Along the main street form the south of the village

- Location within North Lanarkshire
- Population: 1,110 (2020)
- OS grid reference: NS829555
- Council area: North Lanarkshire
- Lieutenancy area: Lanarkshire
- Country: Scotland
- Sovereign state: United Kingdom
- Post town: WISHAW
- Postcode district: ML2
- Dialling code: 01698
- Police: Scotland
- Fire: Scottish
- Ambulance: Scottish
- UK Parliament: Airdrie and Shotts
- Scottish Parliament: Motherwell and Wishaw

Morningside is a small town in North Lanarkshire, Scotland. It is located around 3/4 mile (1.2 km) south of Newmains, and 2 1/4 miles (3.6 km) east of Wishaw. Morningside's population (as of 2016) is 1,090 people. It is a former coal mining village, and formerly had two railway stations. Today, Morningside mainly consists of a modern housing estate with more older houses along the main road.

== History ==
Morningside, although a small town, is a settlement dating back to the Middle Ages, when it was a fermtoun of the Parish of Cambusnethan. It is seen on maps as far back as the 16th century where it is listed as Morninſyid, near Allanton and Kamnethan Moore.

The Wishaw and Coltness Railway was built in the 1830s, and a railway station was built at Morningside to facilitate this, especially given the village's position near the important Coltness Iron Works. A second line was built, named the Wilsontown, Morningside and Coltness Railway, that ran east to Longridge, being further extended to Bathgate in 1850. This line however, was not as economically successful. Morningside Station closed in 1930, the remains of which can be found slightly west of the town today.

In the 21st century, a large low density housing estate was built in Morningside by Barratt Homes. This development was completed by the 2010s and contributes to the vast majority of the town's current population. The estate, which was tailored to families, made Morningside one of the localities in Scotland with the most people under the age of 15.

== Battle of Morranside ==
According to local legend, a large battle occurred on the site of Morningside during the English invasion in 1385. The English sent a force of around 1,000 men to raid Lanarkshire, due to the Scottish scorched earth policy leaving little to forage in Lothian. The Scots met them at "Morranside" in early autumn being commanded by the leaders of Clan Muir and Clan Douglas. The battle ended in a Scottish victory with the English being pushed back to Biggar.

At the time, Morranside was the name given to the small farmstead in the area, as it was to the east of the site of the battle, or "on the morning-side". This name then applied to the village that would form centuries later. However the historicity about this battle is dubious.

== Schools ==
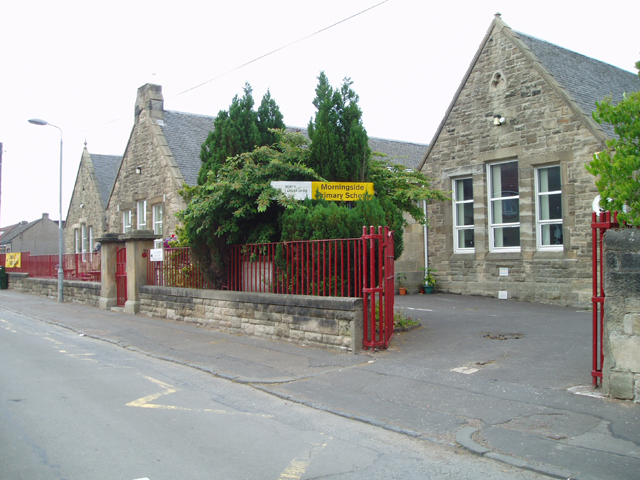
Morningside Primary School

Morningside Primary School is located on School Road, in the north of the town. Built originally in 1874, the school had a roll of 146 in the year of 2010–2011.
