= Stoneyburn =

Village in West Lothian, Scotland

Coordinates: 55.848°N 3.631°W

Stoneyburn: Scottish Gaelic: Allt nan Clach; Scots: Stanyburn
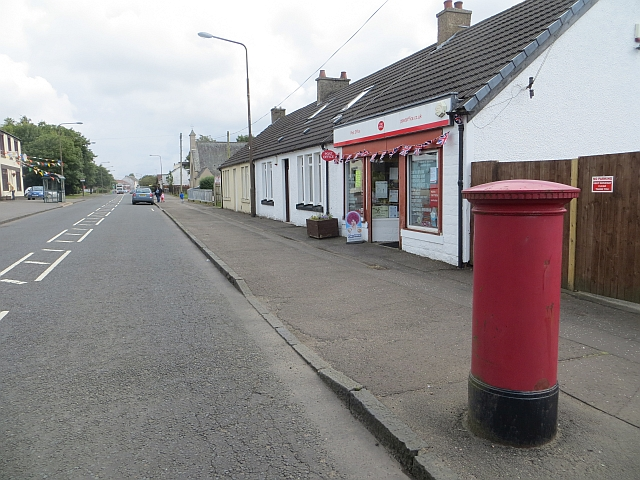
- Stoneyburn Post Office

- Location within West Lothian
- Population: 1,980 (2020)
- OS grid reference: NS978628
- Council area: West Lothian
- Lieutenancy area: West Lothian
- Country: Scotland
- Sovereign state: United Kingdom
- Post town: Bathgate
- Postcode district: EH47
- Dialling code: 01501
- Police: Scotland
- Fire: Scottish
- Ambulance: Scottish
- UK Parliament: Livingston
- Scottish Parliament: Almond Valley

Stoneyburn is a village in West Lothian, Scotland. The village was the site of a large coalmine, since discontinued. Nearby towns include Bathgate, Whitburn, Addiewell and Blackburn. Around two thousand people inhabit the village (2022), which is around 1 1/2 miles (2.5 kilometres) in length, clustered around the B7015 to Fauldhouse and Livingston.

== History ==
In 1850, the Longridge and Bathgate Extension Railway was laid on the western side of Stoneyburn. The nearest station was Foulshiels railway station but it was only in operation from 1850 to 1852.

Stoneyburn house is a small 17th century manor house in the village with a datestone dating back to 1655.

=== Foulshiels Colliery ===
Foulshiels Colliery was a large coal mine located on the edge of Stoneyburn and for which Stoneyburn was largely built to serve as a settlement for workers. Production commenced in the late 19th century and at its height, 463 people worked in the mine, with 1951 being the year of highest production. The pit had miner's baths that built in 1935 to accommodate 600 men, with 37 shower cubicles. As well as 4 screens for grading coal, the site had a canteen. The mine eventually closed in 1957.

=== Bents ===
Bents was developed in 1919 as a housing scheme by United Collieries to house workers. There were 138 homes in the initial development.

=== 20th century ===
Stoneyburn Parish Church was built circa 1925 to an Arts and Crafts style design with a buttressed gable and belfry but is now a private dwelling.

=== 21st century ===
In 2023, the Scottish Government approved the building of 300 new homes in Bents after the developers appealed the planning permission application which had been previously rejected by West Lothian Council.

In 2024, a miner's memorial was erected in Stoneyburn.

== Geography ==
Stoneyburn is situated in the Central Belt of Scotland, some four miles (six kilometres) from Bathgate in the north and five miles (eight kilometres) from Livingston in the east. At approximately 25 miles (40 km) from the centre of Scotland's two major cities, Glasgow and Edinburgh, the village is situated two miles (three kilometres) away from junction 4 of the M8, Scotland's main motorway. Despite this, it is situated in a semi-rural area, surrounded by dairy farms and fields.

Traditionally, the village is divided between Stoneyburn proper and Bents, the latter in the days of railway travel being the location of the railway station.

== Education ==
There are two primary schools, Stoneyburn Primary School and Our Lady's.

== Community ==
Stoneyburn is home to a bowling club and football team Stoneyburn F.C. There is a Roman Catholic church (Our Lady's) and a Church of Scotland as well as a Pentecostal Church in the village. The village also has local shops including a cafe, post office, chemist, takeaways and convenience shops. There is also a Community Centre. The community is also serviced by Stoneyburn and Bents Future Vision Group who operate from the HUB, which includes the village larder and several groups including carers, men's group, youth clubs and craft groups and events www.sbfvg.com.

Stoneyburn had a community centre but this closed in 2024 due to issues arising from Reinforced Autoclaved Aerated Concrete (RAAC) panels in the building.

Foulshiels wood is a public woodland managed by the Woodland Trust. It is located on the site of the former Foulshiels colliery and has a mix of native and conifer trees that were planted in the 1980s.
