= Bents railway station =

Disused railway station in Bents, West Lothian

Bents
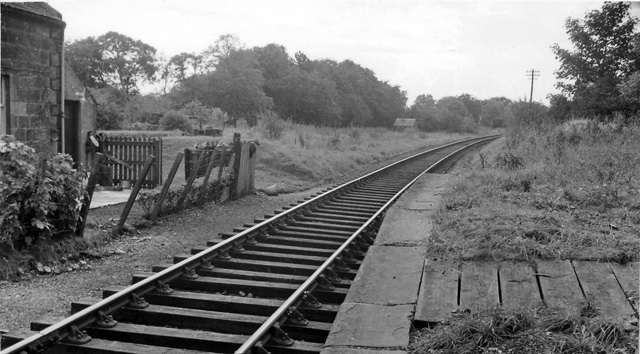
- The site of the station in 1962

General information
- Location: Bents, West Lothian; Scotland
- Coordinates: 55.8419°N 3.6508°W
- Grid reference: NS967621
- Platforms: 1

Other information
- Status: Disused

History
- Original company: Edinburgh and Glasgow Railway
- Pre-grouping: North British Railway
- Post-grouping: London and North Eastern Railway

Key dates
- February 1865: Opened
- 1 May 1930: Closed to passengers
- 2 May 1955: Closed to freight
Location

Bents railway station served the village of Bents, West Lothian, Scotland, from 1865 to 1955 on the Longridge and Bathgate Extension Railway.

== History ==
The station was opened in February 1865 by the Edinburgh and Glasgow Railway. It had originally opened as a goods only station. The goods yard and a station building was to the south and on the platform was a stone building. The station closed to passengers on 1 May 1930 and closed to goods on 2 May 1955.

Preceding station	Disused railways	Following station
Longridge; Line and station closed	Longridge and Bathgate Extension Railway	Foulshiels; Line and station closed
