= Morningside railway station (Lanarkshire) =

Disused railway station in Morningside, North Lanarkshire

Coordinates: 55.7752°N 3.8625°W

Morningside

General information
- Location: Morningside, North Lanarkshire; Scotland
- Platforms: 1

Other information
- Status: Disused

History
- Original company: Wilsontown, Morningside and Coltness Railway
- Pre-grouping: Edinburgh and Glasgow Railway; North British Railway
- Post-grouping: London and North Eastern Railway

Key dates
- October 1844: Opened
- 1848: Closed
- 19 September 1864: Reopened
- 1 May 1930: Closed permanently
Location

Morningside railway station served the village of Morningside, North Lanarkshire, Scotland from 1844 to 1930 on the Wilsontown, Morningside and Coltness Railway.

== History ==
The station was opened in October 1844 by the Wilsontown, Morningside and Coltness Railway and closed in 1848, when the Caledonian Railway opened. It was reopened on 19 September 1864. To the north was the goods yard and further north was a turntable. At the east end was a signal box. There was a line north east which served Coltness Iron Works. The station closed on 1 May 1930.

Preceding station	Disused railways	Following station
Terminus	North British Railway; Wilsontown, Morningside and Coltness Railway	Davies Dyke; Line and station closed
