= Crofthead railway station =

Former railway station in Scotland

Crofthead Fauldhouse and Crofthead
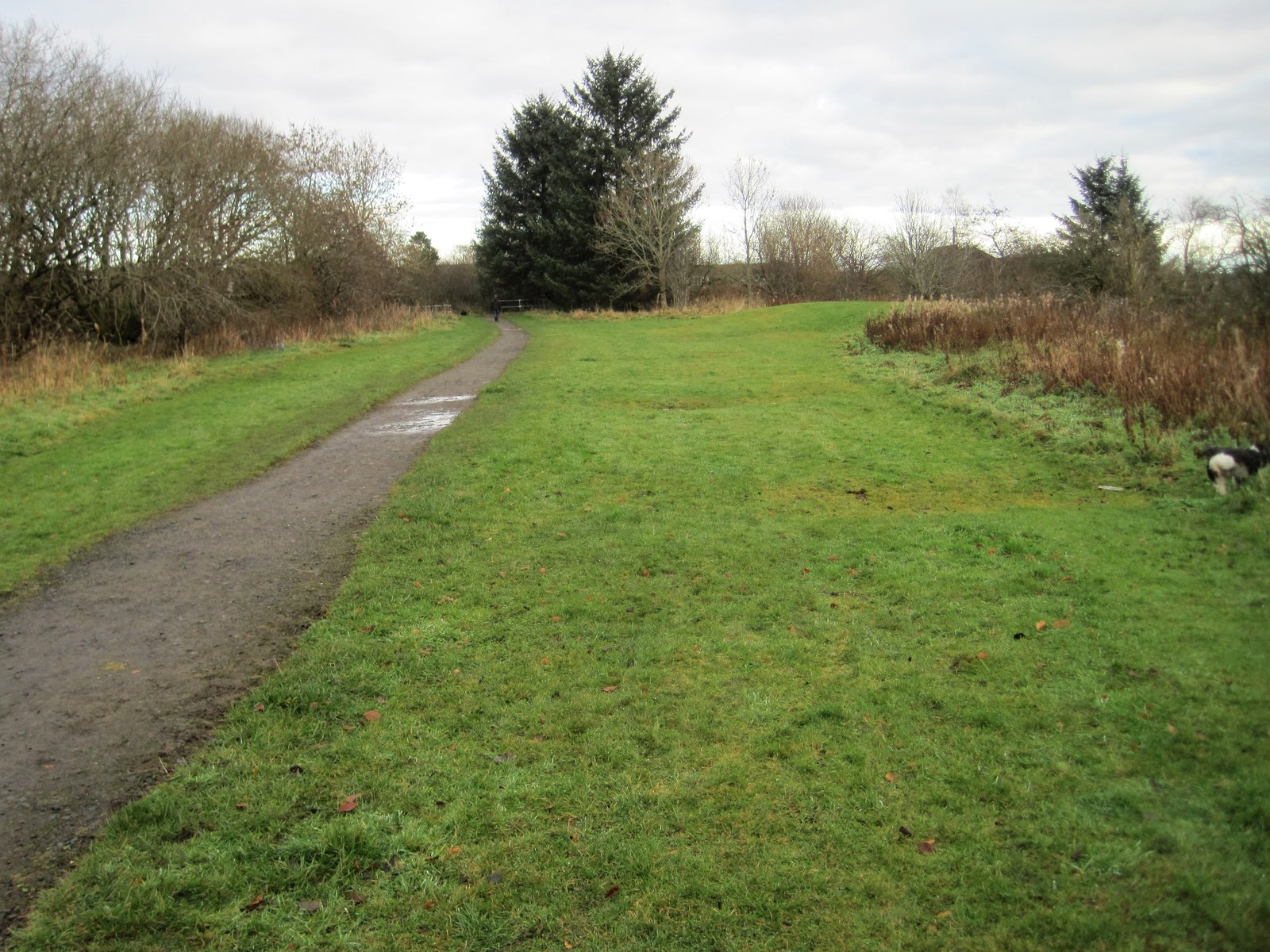
- The site of the station in 2016

General information
- Location: Fauldhouse, West Lothian; Scotland
- Coordinates: 55.8252°N 3.7032°W
- Grid reference: NS 933 604
- Platforms: 1

Other information
- Status: Disused

History
- Original company: Wilsontown, Morningside and Coltness Railway
- Pre-grouping: Edinburgh and Glasgow Railway; North British Railway
- Post-grouping: London and North Eastern Railway

Key dates
- 2 June 1845: Opened
- April 1848: Closed to passengers
- May 1850: Re-opened
- December 1852: Closed to passengers
- 1 October 1864: Re-opened
- 1 October 1906: Renamed Fauldhouse and Crofthead
- 1 May 1930: Closed to passengers
Location

Crofthead railway station or Fauldhouse and Crofthead was a station on the Wilsontown, Morningside and Coltness Railway (WM&CR) that served the area of Crofthead and its miners rows, Greenburn and Gowanbrae near Fauldhouse in West Lothian. The station was located 7 miles 40 chains east of Morningside railway station.

The company at first adopted the standard track gauge for mineral lines of 4 ft 6 in, often referred to as Scotch gauge. The Edinburgh and Glasgow Railway took over the WM&CR in 1849, the track gauge already having been changed in August 1847, from the now almost obsolete 4 ft 6 in to the generally accepted standard gauge of 4 ft 8½ in.

Crofthead station had at first just a single short platform and this is clearly indicated on the OS map of 1854, It was accessed off Bridge Street near the hamlet of Drybridge, close to Fauldhouse. In 1895 the station site is shown with several buildings, sidings and loading docks in addition to a single platform.

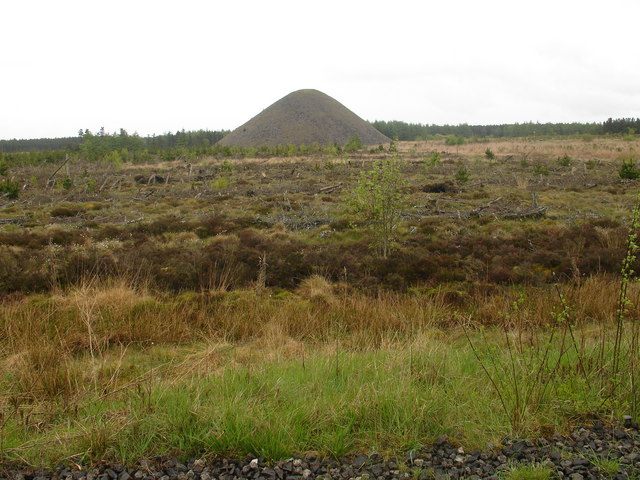
Mining waste on Fauldhouse Moor.

The Caledonian Railway (CR) established a goods and mineral depot nearby and Fauldhouse station is also located in the vicinity of the old Fauldhouse and Crofthead station. A number of mineral lines ran from near the station to collieries in the area, Polkemmet Moor, Cult, Rigghouse, etc.

The station is also recorded by the North British Railway (NBR) study group as opening on 02/06/1845 and closing under the London and North Eastern Railway (LNER) as Fauldhouse and Crofthead on 1 May 1930.

== Services ==
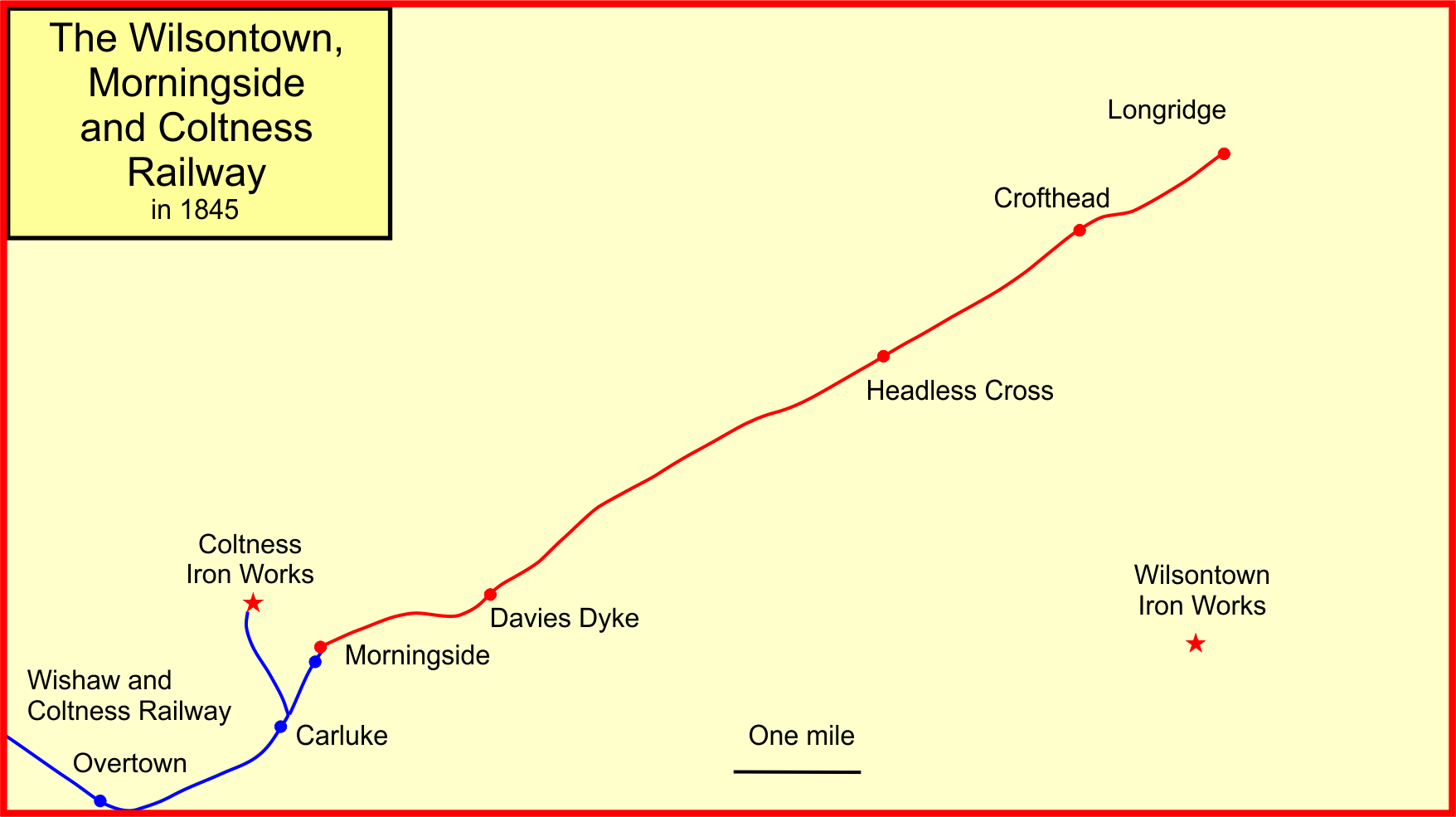
The Wilsontown, Morningside and Coltness Railway in 1845.

The line was worked by steam although the early intention may have been to work the line as a horse drawn waggonway with independent hauliers.

Sporadic passenger services had started from 1845 and a road coach ran between Edinburgh to the original terminus at Longridge from 16 May 1846, passengers disembarking travelling on by train to Townhead. In 1847 two hours was the railway section of the journey, calling at all the stations on the Wilsontown line.

The Caledonian Railway opened its line from Carlisle to Garriongill Junction in 1848 and its trains then ran through to Glasgow over the WM&CR. The demands on the line's capacity may led to the WM&CR passenger service being terminated at this time before being reinstated for a short time a few years later.

The passenger service on the line restarted On 1 October 1864 between Morningside and Bathgate on the 1850 extension, with intermediate stations now only at Blackhall, Crofthead, Bents and Whitburn. The passenger service was sparse with in 1895 only two trains a day from Bathgate and three making the journey west, with one extra service on Saturdays.

== Station site and infrastructure ==
The WMCR stations originally had no waiting rooms or shelters. It was accessed off Bridge Street near the hamlet of Drybridge, close to Fauldhouse. In 1895 the station site is shown with several buildings, sidings and loading docks in addition to a single platform.

Preceding station	Historical railways	Following station
Headless Cross; Towards Wilsontown	Wilsontown, Morningside and Coltness; Wilsontown, Morningside and Coltness line	Longridge; Towards Bathgate
