= Headless Cross railway station =

Former railway station in Scotland

Headless Cross Headlesscross
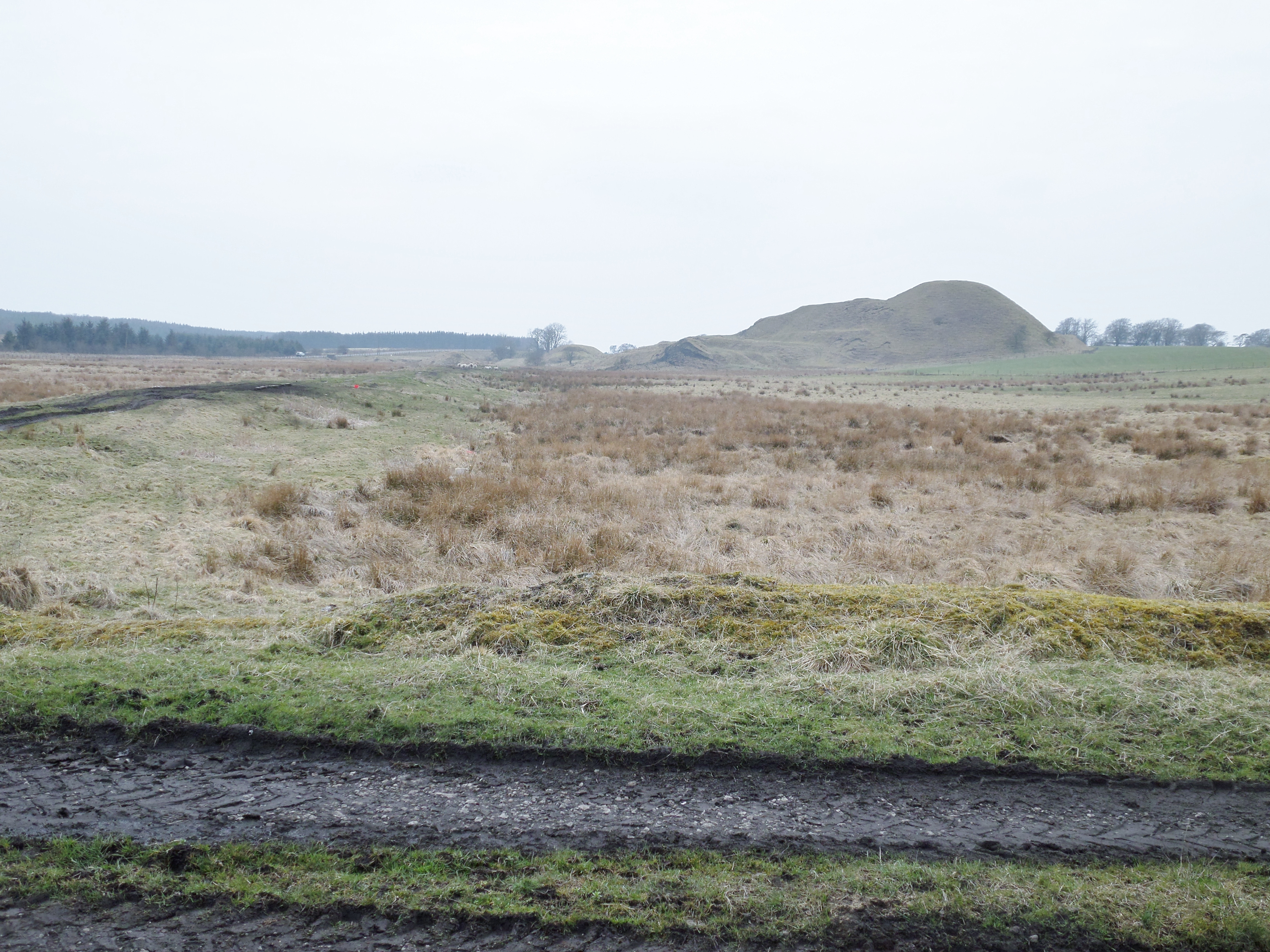
- The site of the station with Knowton Colliery Bing in the background

General information
- Location: Fauldhouse, West Lothian; Scotland
- Coordinates: 55.809976°N 3.745385°W
- Grid reference: NS 907 587
- Platforms: 1

Other information
- Status: Disused

History
- Original company: Wilsontown, Morningside and Coltness Railway
- Pre-grouping: Edinburgh and Glasgow Railway

Key dates
- 1847: Opened
- April 1848: Closed to passengers
- May 1850: Re-opened
- December 1852: Closed to passengers
Location

Headless Cross railway station or Headlesscross railway station was a station on the Wilsontown, Morningside and Coltness Railway (WM&CR) that served the rural area of Headless Cross near Fauldhouse in West Lothian The station was located 4 miles 60 chains east of Morningside railway station.

The company at first adopted the standard track gauge for mineral lines of 4 ft 6 in, often referred to as Scotch gauge. The Edinburgh and Glasgow Railway took over the WM&CR in 1849, the track gauge already having been changed in August 1847, from the now almost obsolete 4 ft 6 in to the generally accepted standard gauge of 4 ft 8½ in.

Headless Cross station had a single short platform that was accessed off the B715 Headlesscross Road and stood just to the west of the old railway overbridge.

== Services ==
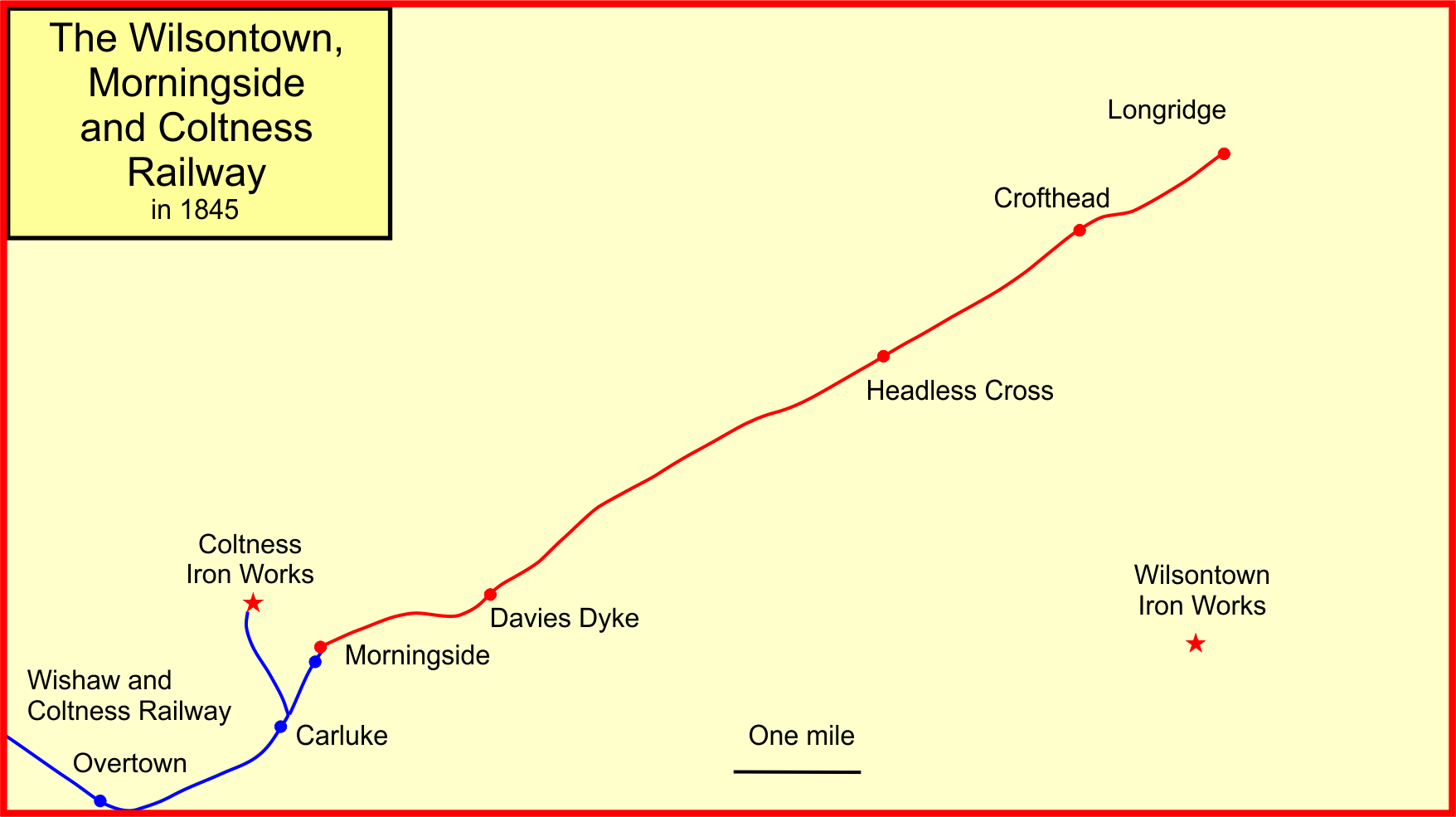
The Wilsontown, Morningside and Coltness Railway in 1845.

The line was worked by steam although the early intention may have been to work the line as a horse drawn waggonway with independent hauliers.

Sporadic passenger services had started from 1845 and a road coach ran between Edinburgh to the original terminus at Longridge from 16 May 1846, passengers disembarking travelling on by train to Townhead. In 1847 two hours was the railway section of the journey, calling at all the stations on the Wilsontown line.

The Caledonian Railway opened its line from Carlisle to Garriongill Junction in 1848 and its trains then ran through to Glasgow over the WM&CR. The demands on the line's capacity may led to the WM&CR passenger service being terminated at this time before being reinstated for a short time a few years later.

The passenger service on the line restarted On 1 October 1864 between Morningside and Bathgate on the 1850 extension, with intermediate stations only however at Blackhall, Crofthead, Bents and Whitburn.

== Station site infrastructure ==
The OS map shows the station site located near the Stane to Fauldhouse road on Headlesscross Road (B715) with an access lane, no clear indication of a platform and no goods yard or signalling. A small square structure was located near to the railway bridge over the road in 1896–97. The WMCR stations had no waiting rooms or shelters.

The 1910 OS map shows the small square structure at the station's site with two signals and a set of points leading to a double track passing loop section with a signal box on the southern side. A footpath runs from the entrance off Headlesscross Road and ran parallel to the track to Knowton Colliery. By 1940 the square structure had been removed.

A short tramway, dismantled by 1895, ran up from next to the Lingore Linn and terminated near the old station site.

Preceding station	Historical railways	Following station
Blackhall; Towards Morningside	Wilsontown, Morningside and Coltness; Wilsontown, Morningside and Coltness line	Crofthead; Towards Longridge
