= Whitburn railway station =

Disused railway station in East Whitburn, West Lothian

Whitburn
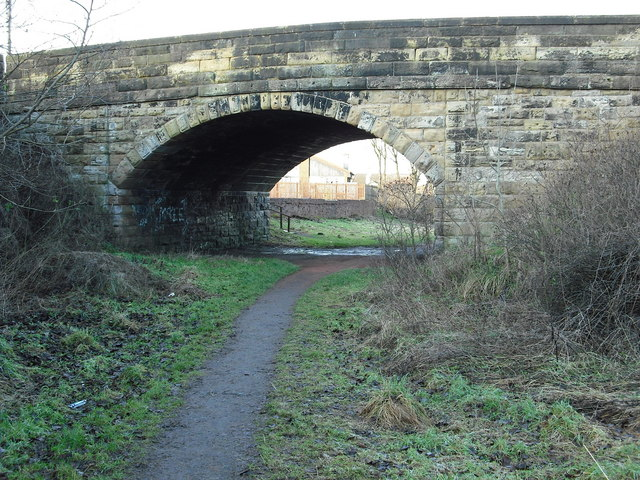
- The bridge near the station in 2009

General information
- Location: East Whitburn, West Lothian; Scotland
- Coordinates: 55.8689°N 3.6592°W
- Grid reference: NS962652
- Platforms: 1

Other information
- Status: Disused

History
- Original company: Edinburgh and Glasgow Railway
- Pre-grouping: North British Railway
- Post-grouping: London and North Eastern Railway

Key dates
- August 1850: Opened
- December 1852: Closed
- 19 September 1864: Reopened
- 1 May 1930: Closed permanently
Location

Whitburn railway station served the town of East Whitburn, West Lothian, Scotland from 1850 to 1930 on the Longridge and Bathgate Extension Railway.

== History ==
The station was opened in August 1850 by the Edinburgh and Glasgow Railway. It had a brick building on its platform. There were sidings on both sides of the station and a signal box, that opened in 1899, to the southwest. To the east was Whitrigg Fireclay Mine and to the southeast was Whitrigg Colliery No 5. The station closed in December 1852 but reopened on 19 September 1864, before closing permanently on 1 May 1930.

Preceding station	Disused railways	Following station
Foulshiels; Line and station closed	Edinburgh and Glasgow Railway; Longridge and Bathgate Extension Railway	Bathgate Upper; Line and station closed
