= Headless Cross =

Headless Cross may refer to:

- Headless Cross (album), a 1989 album by Black Sabbath
- Headless Cross (district), a district of Redditch, England
- Headless Cross (railway station), a former railway station near Fauldhouse, Scotland
