= Foulshiels railway station =

Short-lived railway station in Bathgate, West Lothian

Foulshiels
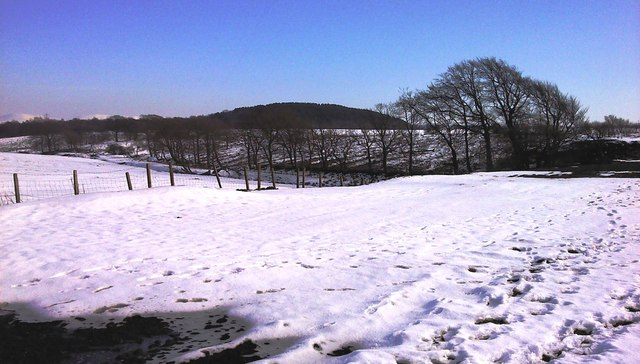
- The site of the station in 2010

General information
- Location: Stoneyburn, West Lothian; Scotland
- Coordinates: 55.8556°N 3.6448°W
- Grid reference: NS975634
- Platforms: 1

Other information
- Status: Disused

History
- Original company: Edinburgh and Glasgow Railway

Key dates
- May 1850: Opened
- 1852: Closed
Location

Foulshiels railway station served the villages of nearby Stoneyburn and Whitburn, Scotland, from 1850 to 1852 on the Longridge and Bathgate Extension Railway.

== History ==
The station was opened in May 1850 by the Edinburgh and Glasgow Railway. It was situated to the north of a level crossing near West Foulshiels farm. It had a station building by the level crossing. It was a short-lived station, closing in 1852.

Preceding station	Disused railways	Following station
Bents; Line and station closed	Edinburgh and Glasgow Railway; Longridge and Bathgate Extension Railway	Whitburn; Line and station closed
