= Wilsontown, Morningside and Coltness Railway =

UK railway company

The Wilsontown, Morningside and Coltness Railway was a railway opened in 1845, primarily for mineral traffic, although a passenger service was run sporadically. The line ran from a junction with the Wishaw and Coltness Railway at Chapel, to Longridge, in South Central Scotland, and it was extended to Bathgate in 1850 after takeover by the Edinburgh and Glasgow Railway. It was built to open up further coal deposits and to connect the Wilsontown Ironworks, although it did not actually reach Wilsontown. In common with the other "coal railways" with which it connected, it adopted the track gauge of 4 ft 6 in, often referred to as Scotch gauge.

Always short of money, the railway was not commercially successful, but in giving access to a developing mineral area, it was taken over by the Edinburgh and Glasgow Railway in 1849, but it retained its independent management for some years. None of the line is still in use except for a very short length at Polkemmett Junction immediately south of Bathgate, which carries the Airdrie - Bathgate - Edinburgh passenger service.

== Origins ==
Wilsontown, Morningside and Coltness Railway Act 1841
- Act of Parliament
- Parliament of the United Kingdom
- Long title: An Act for making a Railway to be called the Wilsontown, Morningside, and Coltness Railway, in the Counties of Lanark and Linlithgow.
- Citation: 4 & 5 Vict. c. xliii

Dates
- Royal assent: 21 June 1841

Other legislation
- Repealed by: Edinburgh and Glasgow Railway (Wilsontown, Morningside and Coltness Railway Transfer) Act 1849

Status: Repealed

The line was built as an extension from the Wishaw and Coltness Railway (W&CR) to get access to unexploited coal resources in the area towards Shotts and Fauldhouse, and to connect to the isolated ironworks at Wilsontown; it was authorised under the Wilsontown, Morningside and Coltness Railway Act 1841 (4 & 5 Vict. c. xliii), and it opened on 2 June 1845. It was originally to be called The Shotts and Wilsontown Railway.

== Route and location ==
=== Original line ===
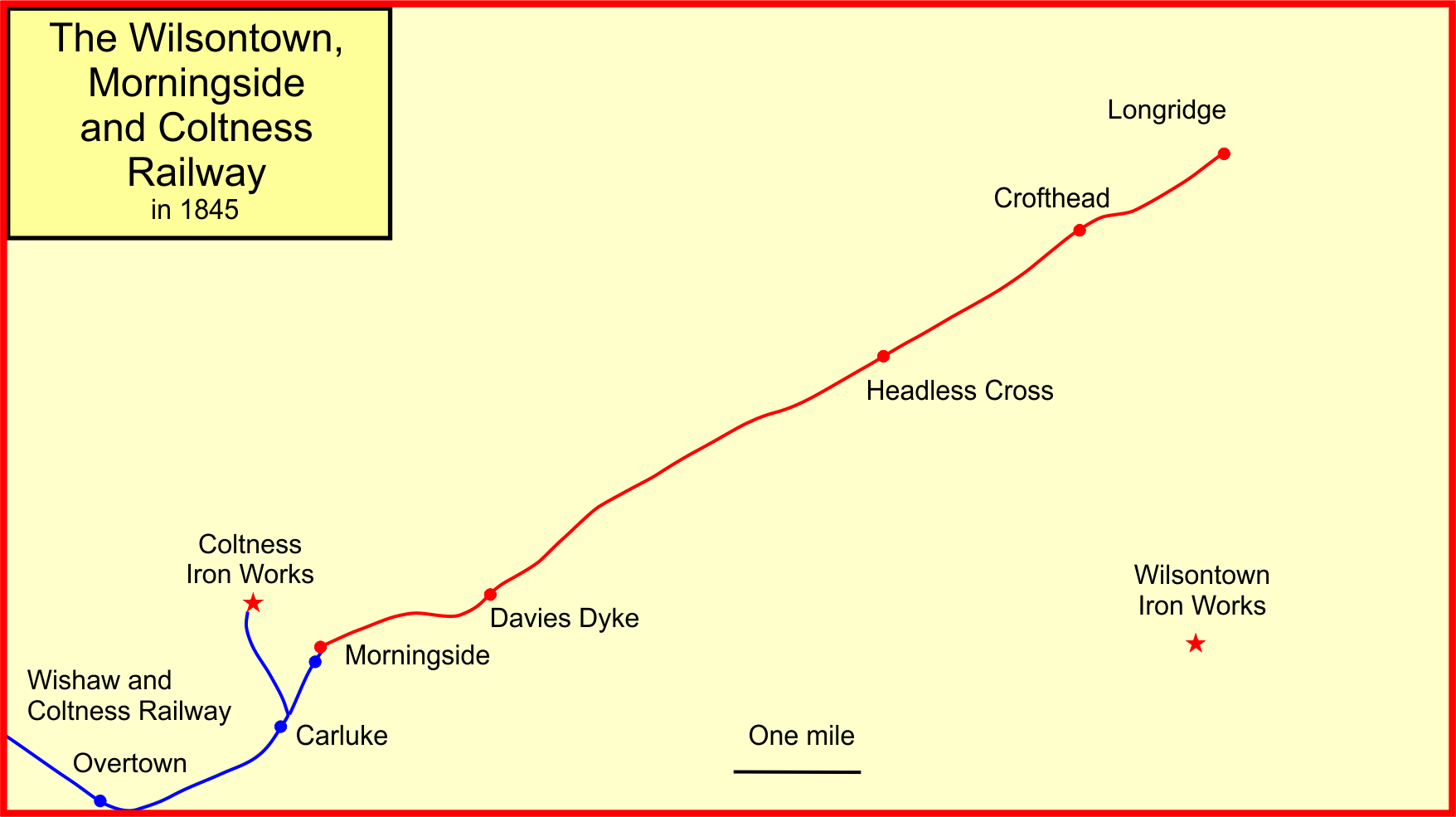
WM&CR System at opening

The original line of the Wilsontown, Morningside and Coltness Railway (WM&CR) made an end-on connection with the Wishaw and Coltness Railway (W&CR) at Morningside, near Newmains in Lanarkshire. A single line, it ran broadly east a distance of nearly nine miles to Longridge, near Whitburn. Planned with great hopes of opening up mineral resources, it crossed "empty moorland south of Shotts" and a government inspector reported at opening that at the eastern end, "the line terminates in a large field, about a mile from a small village called Whitburn".

Getting financial support from shareholders was not easy in the 1840s, and quoting the names of successful and growing iron works—at that time seen as the technological future—was a way of attracting subscriptions. However Coltness was already well served by the W&CR and the WM&CR never got near Wilsontown.

There is considerable ambiguity among authorities on the detail of the line's route. It is often quoted as starting at Chapel, a small settlement and a colliery which were the eastern extremity of the W&CR, but by 1845 that railway seems to have extended a little further east, reaching Coltness Iron Works and opening its own Morningside station on the west side of Morningside Road (now the A71 road). The WM&CR built an east-facing passenger terminus on the east side of the road. The two stations were two chains (44 yards, 40 m) apart (Cobb shows two Morningside stations, both opened in 1845, with a short length of Caledonian Railway, i.e. the Wishaw and Coltness Railway, line between them.)

There were passenger stations at Daviesdykes (or Davies Dykes), Blackhall, Headless Cross (or Headlesscross), Crofthead (on the west side of present-day Fauldhouse) and at Longridge, on the main road between Whitburn and Forth (now the A706).

== Technical details at opening ==
Captain J. Coddington of H.M. Railway Inspectorate examined the line on 2 June 1845 and described the line in his report:

[The line] consists of single line of rails throughout ... The largest bridge is one of 34 feet bearing; on iron girders each of which has been proved to 20 tons before leaving the foundry ... The bridges over the railway are only 21 feet in span, which though sufficient for a single line, would be dangerous should the traffic induce the proprietors to make it double; and as their land and works would generally admit of it, it would be desirable to prohibit them from making it a double line [without authorisation].

The bridges are of ashlar masonry, and are strong and substantially constructed, except one which carries the turnpike road from Edinburgh to Ayr over the line. (Note: The bridge was at the point where the A71 crossed the line, about 500 m west of Headless Cross) The railway is here on the level of the natural surface, and the bridge is wholly elevated. The abutments have been insufficient of themselves to sustain the arch which has spread; so that the piers, which were originally plumb, are six inches wider at the top than at the level of the ground, and the joints of the arch were opened. The abutments do not rest against solid material, but are backed with peat dug from the adjoining moss, which, when thrown up and drained of its moisture, becomes light an offers no resistance to the thrust. This bridge, however, appears to have settled down to a steady bearing, as the soffit of the arch had been pointed with cement on the 15th April last, since which time there has been no further yielding. I examined it very carefully, having got on the roof of a carriage, and passed very slowly along it, and I could not perceive any crack or defect in the pointing, so that I do not apprehend any danger; but I intimated to the directors that it would be necessary to strengthen the abutments, and to remove the peat by small portions at a time, supplying its place with earth, gravel, or other heavy and resisting material, well rammed, and immediate attention was promised to it.

The general character of the line is a steep ascent for the first four miles, at gradients varying between 1 in 60 and 1 in 80, after which it is nearly level. Although it is proposed to open it for the conveyance of passengers, they form a very minor consideration, the chief object of the line being to convey the ironstone found at its further extremity to the Coltness, and other extensive ironworks at its commencement. The weight of the traffic will therefore descend the above mentioned gradients.

The permanent way is ballasted 15 feet wide, and is laid with transverse fir sleepers, 8 feet long and 8 by 4 inches in section; the rails are of the parallel form, 56 lbs per yard; the chairs are cast to fit them and are slid on from either end, keyed in their place with an iron wedge, and spiked down to the sleepers; a singular arrangement which precludes the shifting [of] a broken or defective rail, without deranging the permanent way for its whole length.

There are no passenger sheds or waiting rooms erected, and the line terminates in a large field, about a mile from a small village called Whitburn.

There can be no chance of collision on this single line, as the Company intend to use only one engine. It is a very powerful one, having cylinders of 14 inch with 21 inches stroke; six wheels of 4 ft 6 in diameter, four of them being coupled together. The tender contains 1,000 gallons of water and the whole will weigh about 20 tons. It has taken 60 tons up the gradients, at the rate of 33 miles per hour.

The carriages are first and second class, and it is intended to use the latter, which are closed and have glass windows, for the Parliamentary third class trains.

An appendix gives details of the Permanent Roadway:

The railway is single throughout. Sidings every 40 chains; length of each siding five chains. (Note: Several of these sidings can be seen on the 1859 series large scale Ordnance Survey maps. Many of them are remote from road access and their purpose is not obvious. Thirty years earlier, horse tramways provided frequent short sidings of this type to enable passing, and it is possible that these sidings were made on the same basis, before the company decided on steam locomotive traction on the one engine in steam principle.) The Company have sufficient land to make a double line. Gauge of rails 4 ft 8½ in from centre of rail to centre of rail, and 4 feet 6 inches from inside to inside of rail ... The sleepers are laid transverse. Depth of ballasting 1 foot 6 inches.

Coddington gives the location of the stations. The area had a very sparse population, reflected by the location of the stations: the start of the line had no station; trains would run in from the Wishaw and Coltness. (This may simply mean that the Company had not provided passenger station accommodation, and to avoid criticism on the point, stated that the W&CR trains would stop at their own station. Coddington said:

"There are six stations on the line viz.:

- 1. Morningside
- 2. Davies Dyke, at 1 mile 60 chains from commencement of line. closed 1849
- 3. Blackhall, opened 2 June 1845, closed December 1852, reopened 1 October 1864, closed 1 November 1893. (Butt)
- 4. Headless Cross, 4 miles 60 chains ditto.
- 5. Crofthead, 7 miles 40 chains ditto.
- 6. Eastern Station, or Longridge, 8 miles 50 chains ditto."

== The line in operation ==
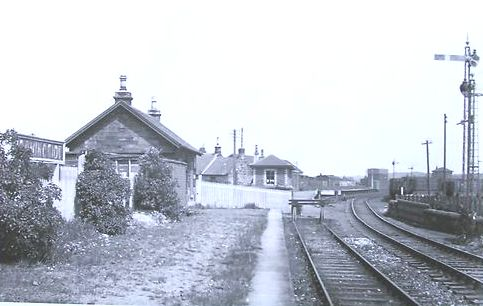
Morningside W&CR station looking East; the WM&CR station is clearly visible a few hundred yards away

At first, prior to the opening of the WM&CR, the group of "coal railways" in Lanarkshire, the Garnkirk and Glasgow Railway (G&GR), the Monkland and Kirkintilloch Railway (M&KR), the Ballochney Railway, the Slamannan Railway, and the Wishaw and Coltness Railway had worked in harmony. They shared the same track gauge, and their approach to technology and to traffic matters was similar, and much traffic passed over more than one of them. As time moved on, differences of approach grew, particularly over the use of locomotive power, and the G&GR became frustrated over the bottleneck at Coatbridge, where through rail traffic crossed a busy road intersection on the level. It built its own high-level line, by-passing the M&KR, and renaming itself the Glasgow, Garnkirk and Coatbridge Railway (GG&CR). It connected directly to the Wishaw and Coltness Railway (W&CR) at Whifflet, and gradually the GG&CR and the W&CR became aligned more to one another than to the other coal lines.

One thing remained to be achieved in harmony, including the WM&CR: the track gauge was changed in August 1847, from the now obsolete 4 ft 6 in to the standard gauge of 4 ft 8½ in. By now the Caledonian Railway was building its intercity line from Carlisle, and was planning to enter Glasgow over the standard gauge rails of the W&CR and the GG&CR.

If the W&CR was soon to form part of a modern main line, the WM&CR was having difficulty finding traffic. It had decided that further eastward extension was essential. An Annual General Meeting on 9 February 1849 tried to present an optimistic view from a gloomy base:

The traffic on the line has progressively improved, notwithstanding the general depression of the iron trade, on which it so much depends, and although the passenger traffic has been stopped on the Wishaw and Coltness Railway Company since that line has been under the management of the Caledonian Railway Company ... The only works remaining under contract are those on the Bathgate branch. Considerable progress has been made with these, and the engineer states that one-half of the line will be ready for traffic in about two months, and that the whole line to Bathgate may be opened in the course of the ensuing summer. When this is accomplished, the Directors propose to resume the passenger traffic on the main line.

The statement of accounts showed that the gross revenue had amounted to £3,576 and the net profits, £1,461.

== Passenger service ==
A passenger service started immediately, run from Longridge to Morningside and then over the W&CR and the Monkland and Kirkintilloch Railway on to the Townhead (Glasgow) terminus of the Garnkirk and Glasgow Railway. It is not clear whether this was locomotive-hauled throughout.

A stagecoach proprietor by the name of Croall ran a road coach from Edinburgh to Longridge from 16 May 1846, from where the train took passengers on to Townhead: the throughout journey took 3¾ hours. In 1847 the railway part of the journey was reported as taking two hours, calling at all the stations on the Wilsontown line.

In 1848, the Caledonian Railway opened its line from Carlisle to Garriongill Junction, where it joined the W&CR; Caledonian trains ran on to Glasgow over the W&CR and its adjoining railways. Suddenly the W&CR transformed from being a "coal railway" to being part of an intercity trunk route, and it appears that the demands on line capacity led to the WM&CR passenger service being terminated at the same time.

There may be inaccuracies in Cobb's monumental work: he shows Blackhall station as opening in 1864 (between Davies Dyke and Headless Cross) but "Blackhall Station" is clearly shown on the 25 inch Ordnance Survey map, surveyed 1859.

Conflicting with Cobb, the Glasgow University Archives Hub says that "there were passenger stations at Morningside, Daviesdykes, Blackhall, Headless Cross, Crofthead and Longridge. In March 1848, Daviesdyke station closed, and Blackhall, Headlesscross, Crofthead and Longridge closed in December 1852, under Edinburgh and Glasgow Railway ownership."

== Extension to Bathgate ==
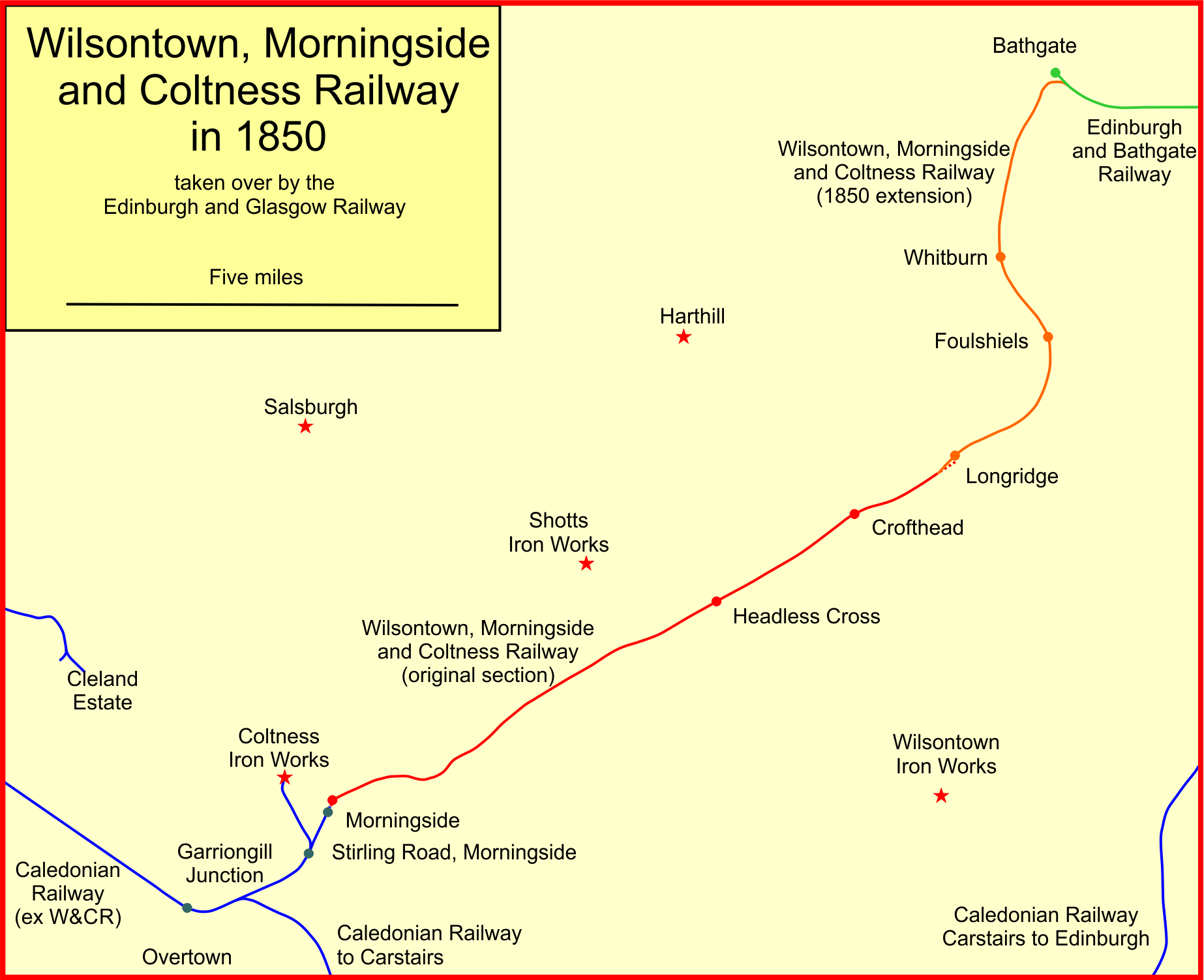
WM&CR 1850

Finding insufficient traffic in its original area, the WM&CR decided to search for traffic further east where there were said to be richer coalfields, as well as important shale deposits. The Edinburgh and Bathgate Railway (E&BR) had opened from a junction on the Edinburgh and Glasgow Railway near Ratho, reaching Bathgate from an easterly direction, in 1849. Their authorising Act was dated 1846 and in the same year the WM&CR obtained its own Act to extend the line from Longridge to Bathgate. The extension line opened for goods and mineral traffic in 1850 some time before a Shareholders' Meeting on 13 March. Passenger traffic started in May 1850.

The extension was proposed and authorised in parliament under the Wilsontown, Morningside and Coltness Railway, but actually opened after takeover by the Edinburgh and Glasgow Railway. The new line ran from a deviation just west of the original Longridge station where the line joined the Edinburgh and Bathgate Railway just east of that company's passenger station. The junction at Bathgate with the E&BR faced Edinburgh and by-passed the E&BR station.

The WM&CR resumed its passenger service, now running between Morningside and Bathgate; it did not have a station at Bathgate, and its passenger trains may have reversed in to the E&BR station.

The stations on the original line reopened except Davies Dyke, so that the station list was now:

- Morningside
- Blackhall; the Ordnance Survey map surveyed in 1859 shows this station without any road or footpath access, at the junction of the line to Shotts Iron Works opened in that year; Cobb shows the station as not opening until 1864; the University of Glasgow Archive Hub shows Blackhall as having been open continuously since 1845; and Butt shows it as being open 1845 to December 1852, and again from 1864 to 1893.
- Headless Cross
- Crofthead until closure then on reopening was known as Fauldhouse and Crofthead
- Longridge; the original terminus had been abandoned and this station was simply a short platform on the deviation to the new line, with no goods facilities.
- Bents, shown on the OS map surveyed in 1854 but shown as opening 1865 (Cobb and Knox).
- Foulshiels, shown on the OS map surveyed in 1854; referred to by Knox but omitted by Cobb and Butt; it was located just north of the later Addiewell Junction.
- Whitburn

Running through remarkably sparse territory, the revived passenger service was again terminated in December 1852. The mainstay of the line was in any case mineral traffic, but this mainstay continued to be very weak.

== Takeover by the Edinburgh and Glasgow Railway ==
Edinburgh and Glasgow Railway (Wilsontown, Morningside and Coltness Railway Transfer) Act 1849
- Act of Parliament
- Parliament of the United Kingdom
- Long title: An Act to authorize the Transfer of the Wilsontown, Morningside, and Coltness Railway to, and to vest the same in, the Edinburgh and Glasgow Railway Company.
- Citation: 12 & 13 Vict. c. lxxii

Dates
- Royal assent: 28 July 1849

Other legislation
- Repealed by: Edinburgh and Glasgow Railway Consolidation Act 1852

Status: Repealed

Text of statute as originally enacted

In 1847 the proprietors saw that the future was a sale of their line to the Edinburgh and Glasgow Railway (E&GR), and a parliamentary bill was prepared; however standing orders prohibited the amalgamation of companies which had not expended half of their authorised capital. This delayed the process until 1849, when the Edinburgh and Glasgow Railway (Wilsontown, Morningside and Coltness Railway Transfer) Act 1849 (12 & 13 Vict. c. lxxii) was obtained, authorising the sale to the E&GR.

The absorption took effect on 28 July 1849, although the line continued to be managed independently until full merger in 1850. Despite the line's limited success, the shareholders sold at a premium: in 1851 it was reported that the company's 28,000 shares of £50 had recently been redeemed by the E&GR at £75.

The E&GR had no direct rail connection to their newly acquired line—trains would run from the WM&CR over the Edinburgh and Bathgate line. The thin mineral pickings cannot have been the attraction. In these years the rival Caledonian Railway (CR) had arrived from Carlisle and now had main lines west to Glasgow and east to Edinburgh, and had taken over the Wishaw and Coltness line with its colliery and iron works connections. Clearly the E&GR feared that the CR would secure all the minerals in the triangle between Lanark, Glasgow and Edinburgh, and the acquisition of the WM&CR was to frustrate this.

== Bathgate Chemical Works ==
A little south of Bathgate, the Bathgate Chemical Works was established in open country a mile or so south of the town. James Young, an industrial chemist, had developed an industrial process of manufacturing paraffin from torbanite, a type of oil shale. He had obtained a patent for the process in October 1850, and the torbanite had been discovered on the Torbanehill estate, about halfway between Bathgate and Whitburn. Young joined in partnership with Edward William Binney and Edward Meldrum and the Bathgate works started operations in February 1851. It was located to the east side of the Wilsontown, Morningside and Coltness Railway line, but it was extended and relocated on the west side later.

== After takeover ==
In 1859 a branch was opened northwards from Blackhall to Shotts Iron Works. A number of branches to pits, notably Addiewell and Polkemmet in 1869. In that year the Edinburgh and Glasgow Railway was itself taken over by the North British Railway

On 1 October 1864, the passenger service on the line re-opened between Morningside and Bathgate, with stations at Blackhall, Crofthead, Bents and Whitburn. There was a minimal service: in 1895 there were two trains a day from Bathgate and three returning, with one extra on Saturday. In 1922 this had increased a little.

The rival Caledonian Railway operated a service from its own Morningside station, 40 m away by rail, heading north to Motherwell. There was not much co-ordination of train times, and the 40 m of railway between the two stations did not have a passenger service.

The passenger operation lasted until May 1930, when it closed.

In 1869 the Caledonian Railway opened a new line from Holytown to Midcalder via Shotts, providing new and more convenient access to some of the mineral terminals on which the WM&CR line depended: exactly the outcome feared by the Edinburgh and Glasgow Company twenty years previously.

As the mining activities declined with geological exhaustion, the line, wholly dependent on them, withered too, and closed progressively in the 1960s, except for a stub at the western end (closed 1974) and the short length from the junction with the Edinburgh and Bathgate Railway at Bathgate to Polkemmet Junction where the Monkland Railways line to Airdrie diverged: this had closed to passengers in 1956 but survived as a freight-only line until 1982.

However the line re-opened as a busy passenger route—the fourth Glasgow to Edinburgh line, via Airdrie and Bathgate—in 2010. About half a mile of the WM&CR lives on, with a fifteen-minute frequency (in 2013) of electric passenger trains.
