= Blackhall railway station =

Disused railway station in Shotts, North Lanarkshire

Blackhall

General information
- Location: Shotts, North Lanarkshire; Scotland
- Coordinates: 55.799°N 3.7831°W
- Grid reference: NS883576
- Platforms: 1

Other information
- Status: Disused

History
- Original company: Wilsontown, Morningside and Coltness Railway
- Pre-grouping: Edinburgh and Glasgow Railway

Key dates
- 2 June 1845: Opened
- December 1852: Closed
- 19 September 1864: Reopened
- 1 November 1893: Closed
Location

Blackhall railway station served the town of Shotts, North Lanarkshire, Scotland, from 1864 to 1893 on the Wilsontown, Morningside and Coltness Railway.

== History ==
The first site of the station was opened on 2 June 1845 by the Wilsontown, Morningside and Coltness Railway. It was named after Blackhall Farm, which was to the west. It closed in December 1852 but reopened on 19 September 1864. A branch opened in 1859 which served Shotts Iron Works. The station closed to passengers on 1 November 1893 due to the remodelling of the junction where it was situated and a signal box opened nearby. The timetable shows the station being used by surfacemen in 1923.

Preceding station	Disused railways	Following station
Davies Dyke; Line and station closed	Wilsontown, Morningside and Coltness Railway	Headless Cross; Line and station closed
