= Longridge railway station (Scotland) =

Former railway station in Scotland

Longridge Eastern Station
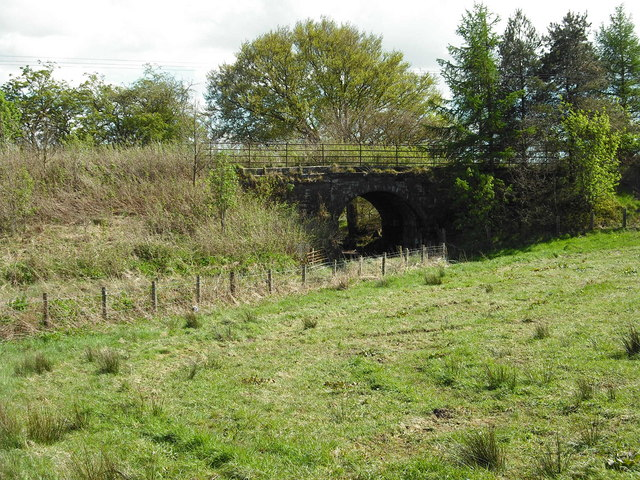
- Old railway bridge just east of the 1850 station.

General information
- Location: Longridge, West Lothian; Scotland
- Coordinates: 55.834861°N 3.673048°W
- Grid reference: NS 953 661
- Platforms: 1

Other information
- Status: Disused

History
- Original company: Wilsontown, Morningside and Coltness Railway
- Pre-grouping: Edinburgh and Glasgow Railway

Key dates
- 2 June 1845: Opened
- April 1848: Closed to passengers and freight
- May 1850: Re-opened in a slightly different location
- December 1852: Closed to passengers
Location

Longridge railway station was the original terminus of the Wilsontown, Morningside and Coltness Railway (WM&CR) that served the nearby village of Longridge in West Lothian and it was also referred to as Eastern station and was 8 miles 50 chains (13.9 km) from Morningside station.

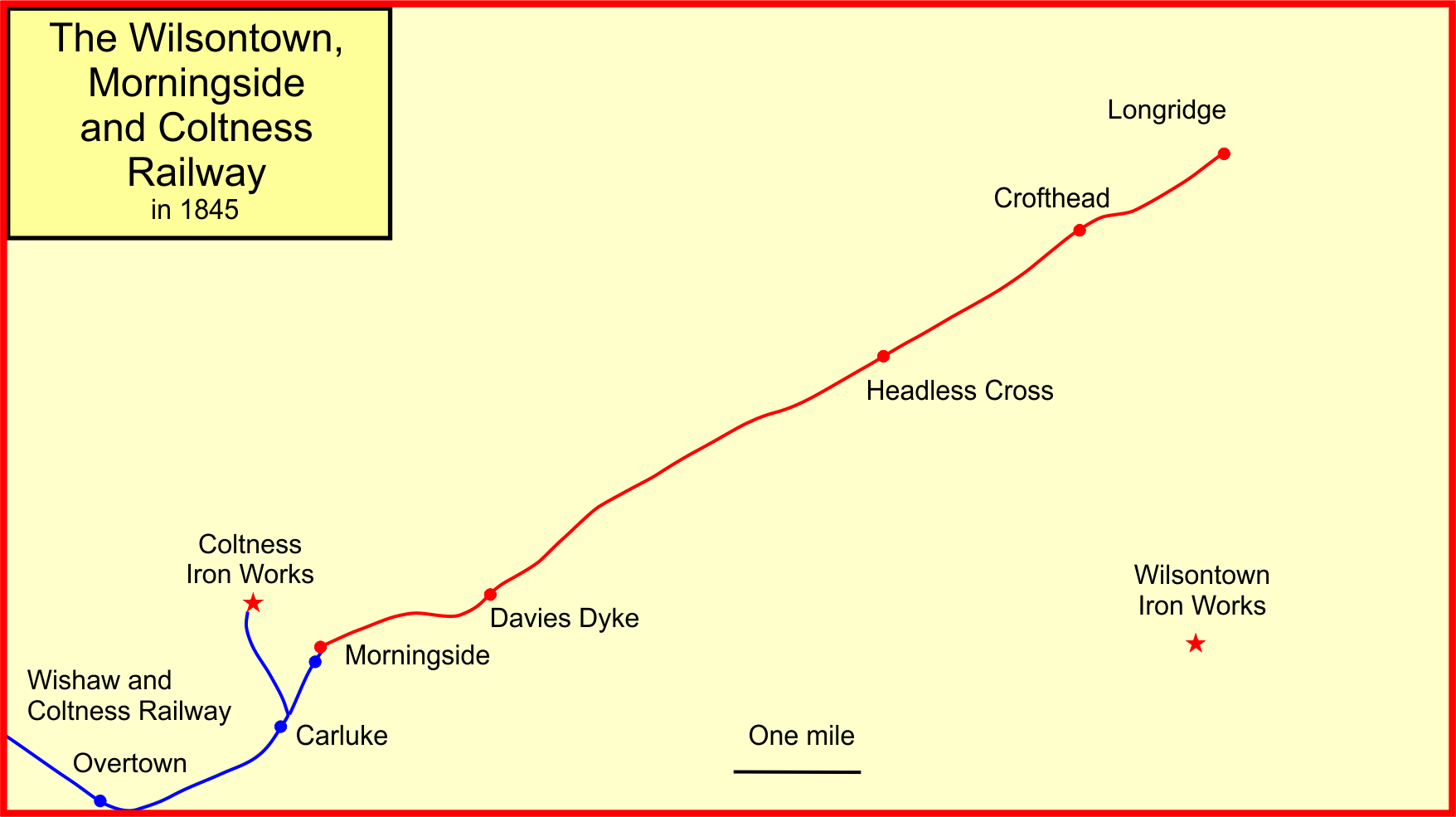
The Wilsontown, Morningside and Coltness Railway in 1845.

The first station opened as the then terminus of the line at Longridge in 1845 and was then closed in 1848. The railway was extended to Bathgate on a different alignment that diverted the route to the north where a new station (55.833977, -3.673023), a simple platform, was opened in May 1850 but closed in December 1852.

The W,M&CR at first adopted the standard track gauge for mineral lines of 4 ft 6 in (1,372 mm), often referred to as Scotch gauge. The Edinburgh and Glasgow Railway took over the W,M&CR in 1849, the track gauge already having been changed in August 1847, from the now almost obsolete Scotch gauge to the generally accepted standard gauge of 4 ft 8 1/2 in (1,435 mm).

This made Longridge one of the few purely Scotch gauge stations to have existed as it closed before the gauge was converted.

The later Longridge station of 1850 had a single short platform that was accessed off the A706 Longridge to Breich road and stood just to the west of the railway overbridge.

== Services ==
The line was worked by steam although the early intention may have been to work the line as a horse drawn waggonway with independent hauliers.

Passenger services had started from 1845 and a road coach ran between Edinburgh to Longridge from 16 May 1846, passengers disembarking travelling on by train to Townhead. In 1847 two hours was the railway section of the journey, calling at all the stations on the Wilsontown line.

The Caledonian Railway opened its line from Carlisle to Garriongill Junction in 1848 and its trains then ran through to Glasgow over the WM&CR. The demands on the line's capacity may led to the WM&CR passenger service being terminated at this time before being reinstated for a short time a few years later.

== Station infrastructure ==
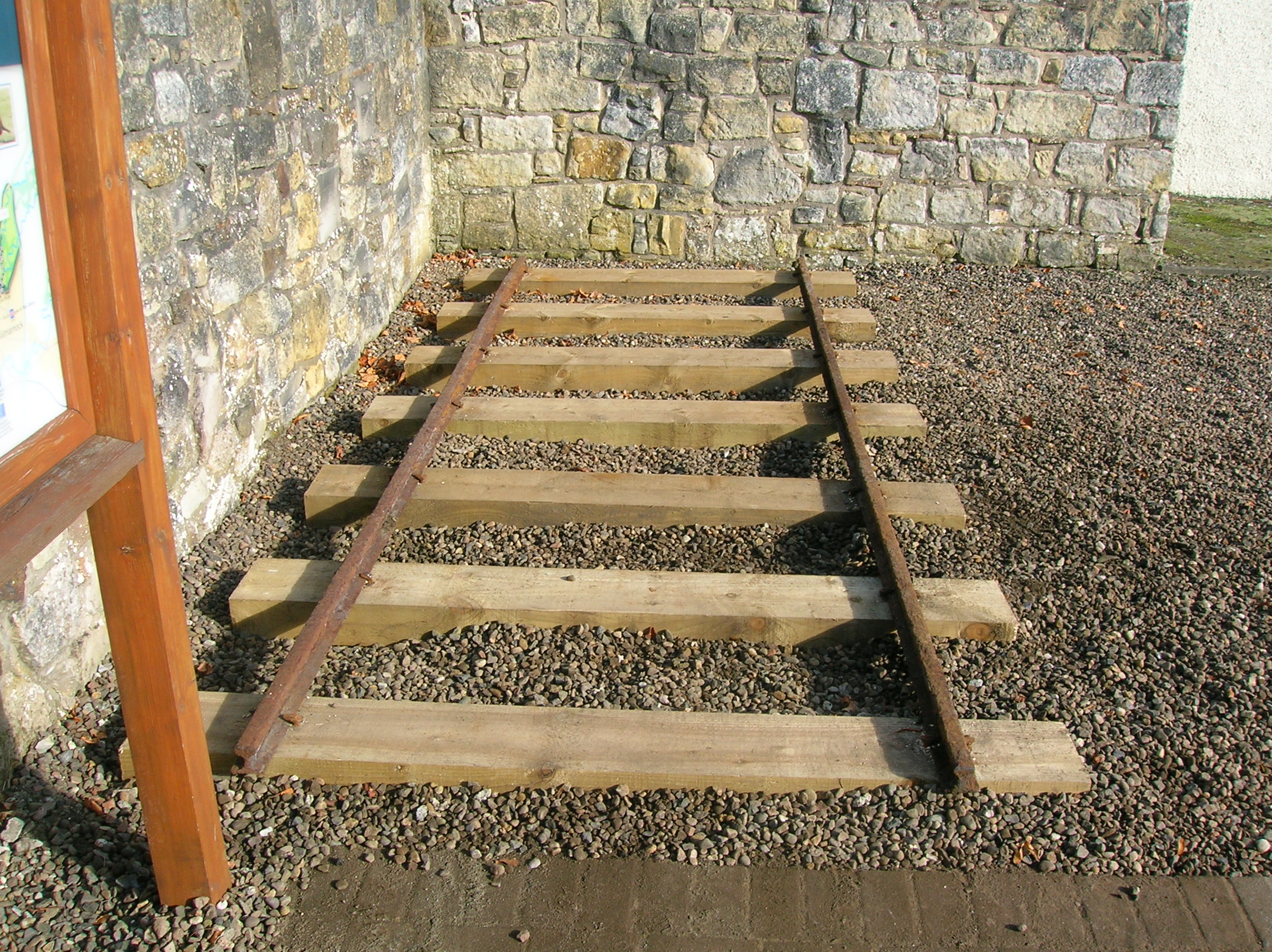
A section of original Scotch gauge railway track from the Ardrossan Railway.

A Government inspector recorded that at opening that at the eastern end, "the line terminates in a large field, about a mile from a small village called Whitburn" and that no passenger shelters of waiting rooms were provided.

The OS map indicates that the original station had a single platform with a goods yard that had at least one siding and a well. Two buildings were located in the goods yard.

The 1905 OS map shows a large and a smaller building at the site of the junction of the later line to Bathgate with a short stub with a set of buffers running towards the old station site. The over bridge here was reached by two long embankments to achieve enough height for a road bridge over the line. The two buildings mentioned were not present in although the short stub of line into the station was present.

The later station had a single short platform that was accessed off the A706 on the Longridge side and appears to only have had a pedestrian access with no goods yard or sidings. In 1905 the platform and access are still marked.

In 2015 the site of the terminus station remains undeveloped and is mainly occupied by small forestry plantations. The overbridge on the line towards Morningside has been removed as has the railway bridge at the later station. No buildings remain on the original site although the earthworks for the platform etc. are still apparent.

Preceding station	Historical railways	Following station
Crofthead; Towards Morningside	Wilsontown, Morningside and Coltness; Wilsontown, Morningside and Coltness line	Terminus; Towards Bathgate

== See also ==
- Breich railway station
- Crofthead railway station
- Headless Cross railway station
