= Fauldhouse =

Coordinates: 55.827229°N 3.709073°W

Fauldhouse: Scottish Gaelic: Falas; Scots: Fauldhoose
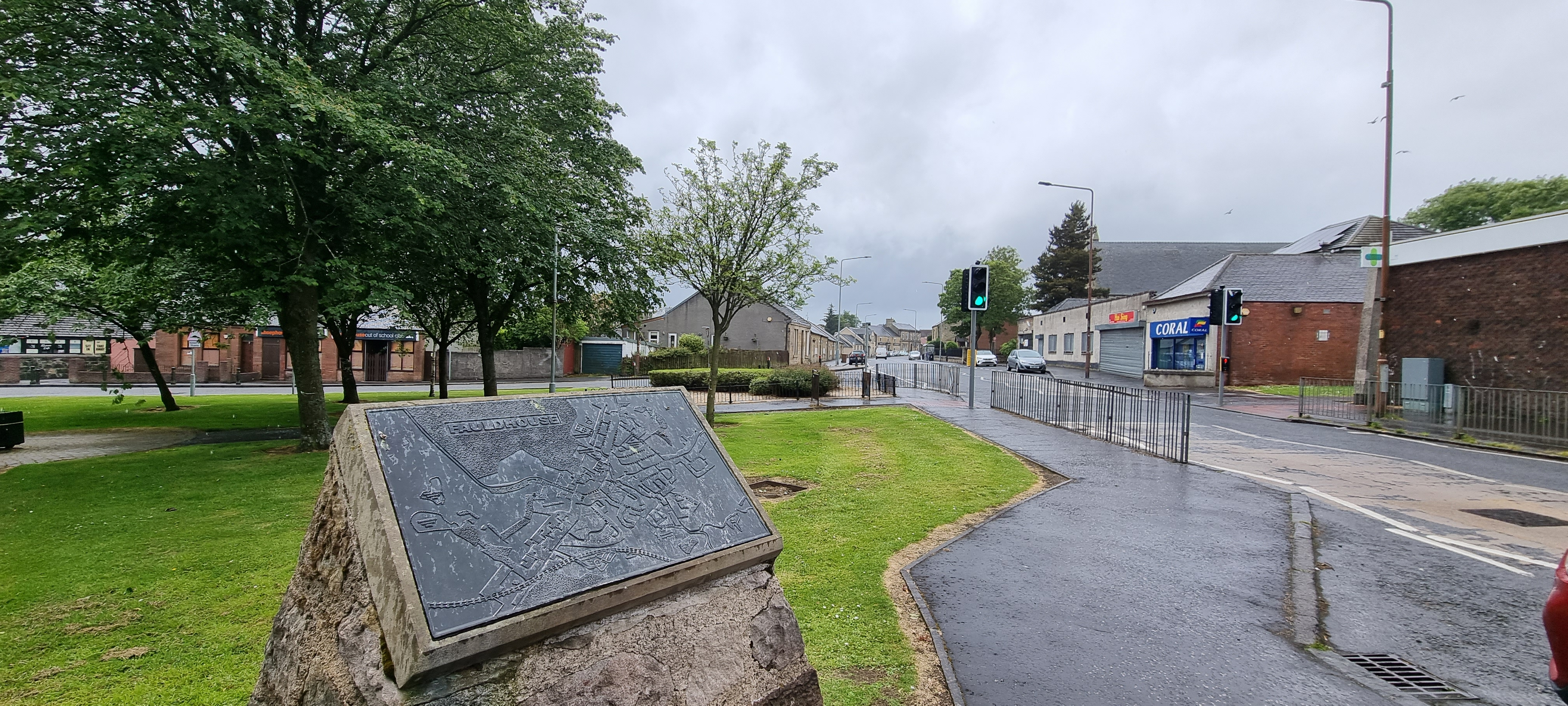

- Location within West Lothian
- Population: 4,900 (2020)
- OS grid reference: NS929606
- Council area: West Lothian
- Lieutenancy area: West Lothian
- Country: Scotland
- Sovereign state: United Kingdom
- Post town: BATHGATE
- Postcode district: EH47
- Dialling code: 01501
- Police: Scotland
- Fire: Scottish
- Ambulance: Scottish
- UK Parliament: Livingston
- Scottish Parliament: Almond Valley

Fauldhouse (Scots: Fauldhoose; Scottish Gaelic: Falas) is a village in West Lothian, Scotland. It is about halfway between Glasgow and Edinburgh. The nearest towns to Fauldhouse are Whitburn and Livingston. Other neighbouring villages include Longridge, Shotts and Stoneyburn. At approximately 750 feet (230 metres) above sea level, Fauldhouse is one of the highest villages in West Lothian.

== History ==
Settlements and farms within Fauldhouse have existed since, at least, the Middle Ages, and was known until the 19th century by the names Falas, Fallas, Fawlhous and Falhous. The first written mention of Fauldhouse was in 1523. The seventeenth century Dutch mapmaker Willem Blaeu features Fauldhouse as Falas on two maps in his Atlas Novus of Scotland, and there are families with the surname Fallas. The name Fallas or Fauldhouse has been translated as "house on the fold", "house in the field", or "house on unploughed (fallow) land". However, the name may be older than the Middle Ages, and might even be derived from the Brythonic or Welsh-type language once spoken in the Lothian region. Historically, Fauldhouse was in the parish of Livingston but in 1730 it was transferred to Whitburn.

Fauldhouse is a former mining community. A mine existed in the area as early as 1790. However, the community developed extensively from the 1830s following discovery of coal and iron resources, in particular the discovery of an extractable slatery ironstone. Focusing initially around three smaller settlements (Crofthead, Drybridge and Greenburn), the village eventually grew and combined as one settlement, following new mines and the coming of the railway in 1845 (transportation of mine workings) and a second line in 1869. Some twenty mines were in operation around Fauldhouse, with the last closing in 1974. Nearby significant local mines and quarries (now closed) included:

- The Greenburn Pit (iron ore).
- Crofthead Quarry and mines (sandstone and iron ore), below the area now marked by Quarry road. Crofthead also included a brick works. Operations ceased in 1909 and the area was used as a rubbish dump by West Lothian County Council before returned to private ownership.
- Fauldhousehills and Fallahills quarries (sandstone).
- Braehead quarries (sandstone, coal and other minerals).
- Shotts road colliery, established between 1864 and 1899.
- Bridge-end colliery (coal).
- Eastfield collieries (coal and iron ore).

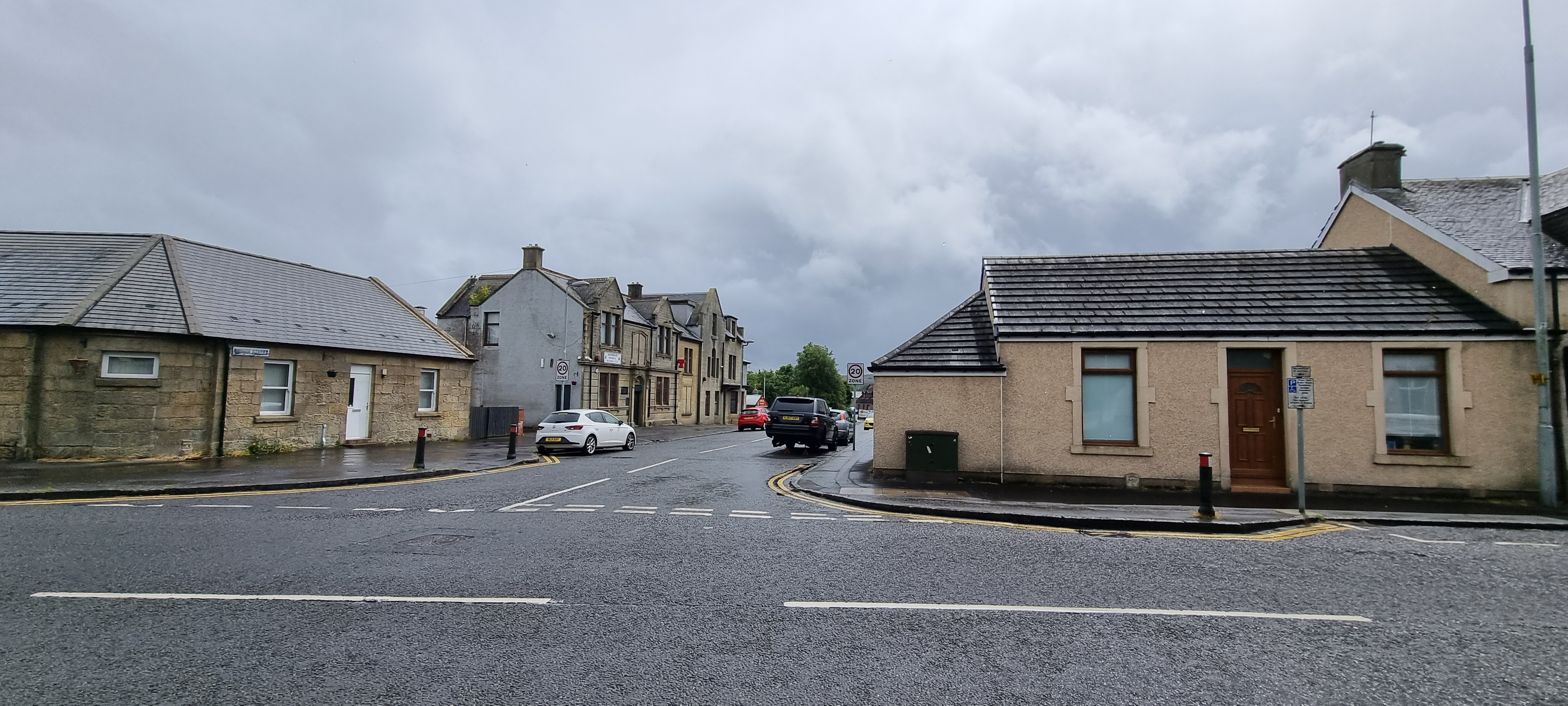
Main Street and Bridge Street including the miners institute in the distance

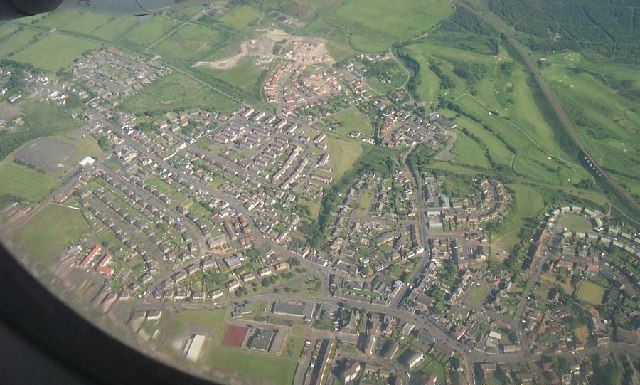
Fauldhouse seen from the air in 2003

The central street, Main Street has a number of substantial ashlar stone cottages. These are known locally as the “Garibaldi Row”. Those stone houses in the West End were constructed by Thomas Thornton & Co who also owned the miners shop. In 1895, the Caledonia Hotel was built and served as a station hotel and cultural venue for the village. The building has oriel windows. The hotel was damaged by fire in 1985 and then closed in 1992 when it was converted into flats. In 1900, Crofthead Primary school was built in the village. The school was three storeys and has since been converted into a care home, as other new schools have been built. In 1908, a drill hall was built in the village and alter incorporated into the structure of the local mining institute. The hall had an indoor firing range and in 1914 the hall was base for "F" Company, 10th [Cyclist] Battalion, Royal Scots.

The village previously had a theatre and cinema, the Palace Theatre, which opened in 1914. It later became the Savoy Bingo Club and was then demolished.

== Transport ==
The village is served by the Fauldhouse railway station, on the Shotts Line between Glasgow and Edinburgh.

Lothian Country operate bus services:

- 72 – Fauldhouse – Whitburn – Blackburn – Livingston – Broxburn – Kirkliston
- 74 – Fauldhouse – Stoneyburn – Addiewell – West Calder – Polbeth – Livingston

== Education ==
The village has two primary schools, Falla Hill and St. John the Baptist RC. The local high school for Falla Hill is Whitburn Academy and for St John the Baptist, St. Kentigern's Academy in Blackburn.

== Religion ==
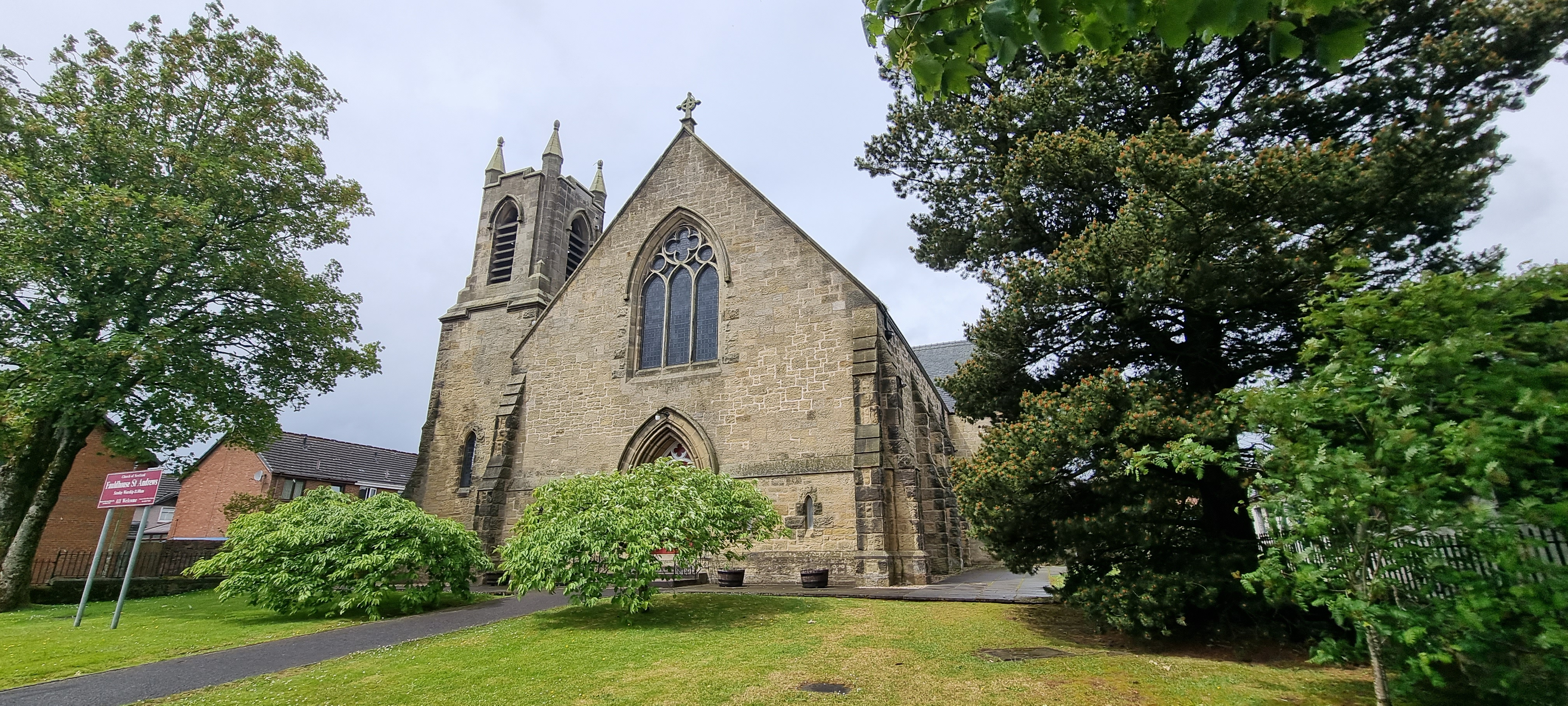
St Andrew's Church, Fauldhouse

There are two churches in Fauldhouse. St Andrew's Kirk on Main Street was built in 1866 and designed by Angus Kennedy. It is in a Gothic revival style and has buttresses and a traceried window. There was previously a United Free Church in Crofthead, which was united with Fauldhouse church in 1973 to form Fauldhouse St Andrew's Parish Church.

The church of St. John the Baptist was the first Roman Catholic parish in West Lothian and was built in 1873. Designed by W & R Ingram, it consists of a chapel with corbelled belfry and spirelet above a rose window and contains several fine examples of Stained Glass.

== Geography ==
At 3.4 kilometers to the south east of Fauldhouse, overlooking the village, lies the Leven Seat hill. The hill has a height of 356 meters.

Atop the hill there is a small statue of Buddha on the hill's trig point. The Leven Seat Klostoph Buddha used to sit on the water trough at the bottom of the hill. It was frequently carried to the trig point and back down but now sits permanently at the top. Over the years it has been painted white from its original grey and more recently, gold.

== Sports ==
=== Football ===
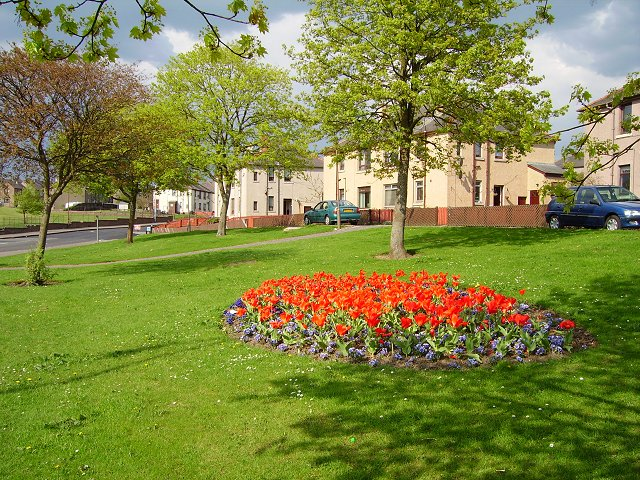
Fauldhouse in flower

The local football club is Fauldhouse United, winners of the Scottish Junior Cup in 1946, who now play in the East of Scotland Football League.

In 2001, the Fauldhouse Foxes BC was formed, later known as Fauldhouse FCA. They now operate with teams ranging from Under 9 up to Under 19. The Under 13s won the Scottish Cup in 2011, beating Syngenta Juveniles 3–0 in the final.

=== Golf ===
To the south of Fauldhouse is the 18-hole Greenburn Golf Course which was founded in 1892, but has been on its present site for around 50 years. Trains run through the course over a viaduct.

=== Cricket ===
The local cricket club is Fauldhouse Victoria. They were established in 1855, and are one of the oldest clubs in Scotland. The 1st team plays in the East of Scotland Division 1. As of 28 June 2023 no trace of the cricket club as an active club can be found. The last activity seems to have been in East League division three in 2018.

=== Swimming ===
The swimming club in Fauldhouse is called the Fauldhouse Penguins. They are part of the swimming development programme in West Lothian called Swim West Lothian (SWL).

== Notable people ==
- Stephen Greenhorn (born 1964), playwright and screenwriter
- Rob Whiteford (born 1983), mixed martial artist
- Jack Aitchison (born 2000), football player
- Paige Turley (born 1997), Winner of Love Island 2020
- Reese Lynch (born 2001), Gold Medal 2022 Birmingham Commonwealth Games, Lightweight Boxing

== See also ==
- Fauldhouse and Crofthead railway station
