= Longridge, West Lothian =

Village in West Lothian, Scotland

Coordinates: 55.843°N 3.678°W

Longridge: Scottish Gaelic: Lannraig; Scots: Langrigg
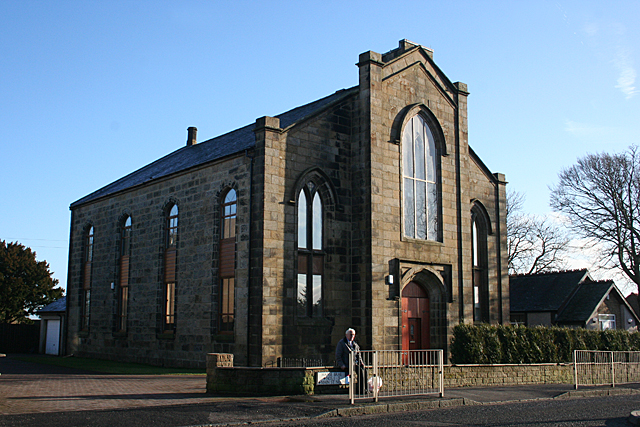
- Longridge Kirk

- Location within West Lothian
- Population: 910 (2020)
- OS grid reference: NS949623
- Council area: West Lothian
- Lieutenancy area: West Lothian
- Country: Scotland
- Sovereign state: United Kingdom
- Post town: BATHGATE
- Postcode district: EH47
- Dialling code: 01501
- Police: Scotland
- Fire: Scottish
- Ambulance: Scottish
- UK Parliament: Livingston
- Scottish Parliament: Almond Valley

Longridge is a village in West Lothian, Scotland. In 2001 the population was 650, with 92.77% of those born in Scotland and 4.31% born in England. Since then, three new streets have been built in Longridge, bringing the population to over 910. Despite its small size, Longridge has a thriving community, with an active community association running events that are very popular with the surrounding villages.

The village has a primary School and nursery with a total of around 90 children. It also has a full-size football pitch that is used by various local teams.

In 1856 the village, then known as Langrigg, had a population of 225, it had a library and a post office, and the economy of the area had improved with the discovery of blackband ironstone, known as Crofthead.

Two Longridge railway stations briefly served the village in the mid-19th century. It is a massive point when driving across west lothian as it crosses 2 roads
