= Edinburgh and Glasgow Railway =

Early Scottish railway company (1842–1865)

The Edinburgh and Glasgow Railway (E&GR) was authorised by an act of Parliament on 4 July 1838. It was opened to passenger traffic on 21 February 1842, between its Glasgow Queen Street railway station (sometimes referred to at first as Dundas Street) and Haymarket railway station in Edinburgh. Construction cost £1,200,000 for 46 miles (74 km). The intermediate stations were at Corstorphine (later Saughton), Gogar, Ratho, Winchburgh, Linlithgow, Polmont, Falkirk, Castlecary, Croy, Kirkintilloch (later Lenzie) and Bishopbriggs. There was a ticket platform at Cowlairs. The line was extended eastwards from Haymarket to North Bridge in 1846, and a joint station for connection with the North British Railway was opened on what is now Edinburgh Waverley railway station in 1847.

Patronage on the line quickly reached double the railway's initial estimates, and by 1850 58 locomotives and 216 coaches were needed to handle the traffic. Goods traffic started in March 1842 and slowly increased, overtaking passenger revenue by 1855.

The line still runs today as the main line between Edinburgh and Glasgow. It was electrified and improved under the auspices of the Edinburgh to Glasgow Improvement Programme. Eight-car electric Class 385 trains started operating from Monday 29 July 2019 between Glasgow and Edinburgh via Falkirk High. The fastest trains are scheduled to take 42 minutes.

== History ==
=== Early schemes ===
The earliest railways in Scotland were waggonways, intended for horse drawn operation, in most cases from a colliery or other mineral source, to a waterway for onward transport.

Notable early lines were the Kilmarnock and Troon Railway of 1812 and the Monkland and Kirkintilloch Railway of 1826, the first of the "coal railways" of the Monklands area. The Garnkirk and Glasgow Railway (G&GR) was authorised in the same year, and it opened in 1831.

There were unfulfilled ideas of connecting Glasgow and Edinburgh as early as 1824 and when the G&GR got its authorising act, the Garnkirk and Glasgow Railway Act 1826 (7 Geo. 4. c. ciii), there were thoughts of extending from Broomielaw in Glasgow over the G&GR to Edinburgh and Leith; the connection to sea-going shipping was paramount. In 1830 the railway engineers Thomas Grainger and John Miller were commissioned to survey for such a line. There was to be a tunnel under the centre of Glasgow but there was furious opposition to this; it was so strong that the proposal failed.

The Liverpool and Manchester Railway had opened in 1830, and was more successful than its promoters expected, showing that an intercity railway could be commercially successful. The pressure to connect the two great cities of central Scotland continued, and in the second half of the 1830s money became freely available, and investors, chiefly in England (many of them shareholders in the Liverpool and Manchester line), promoted a viable railway.

=== E&GR authorised ===
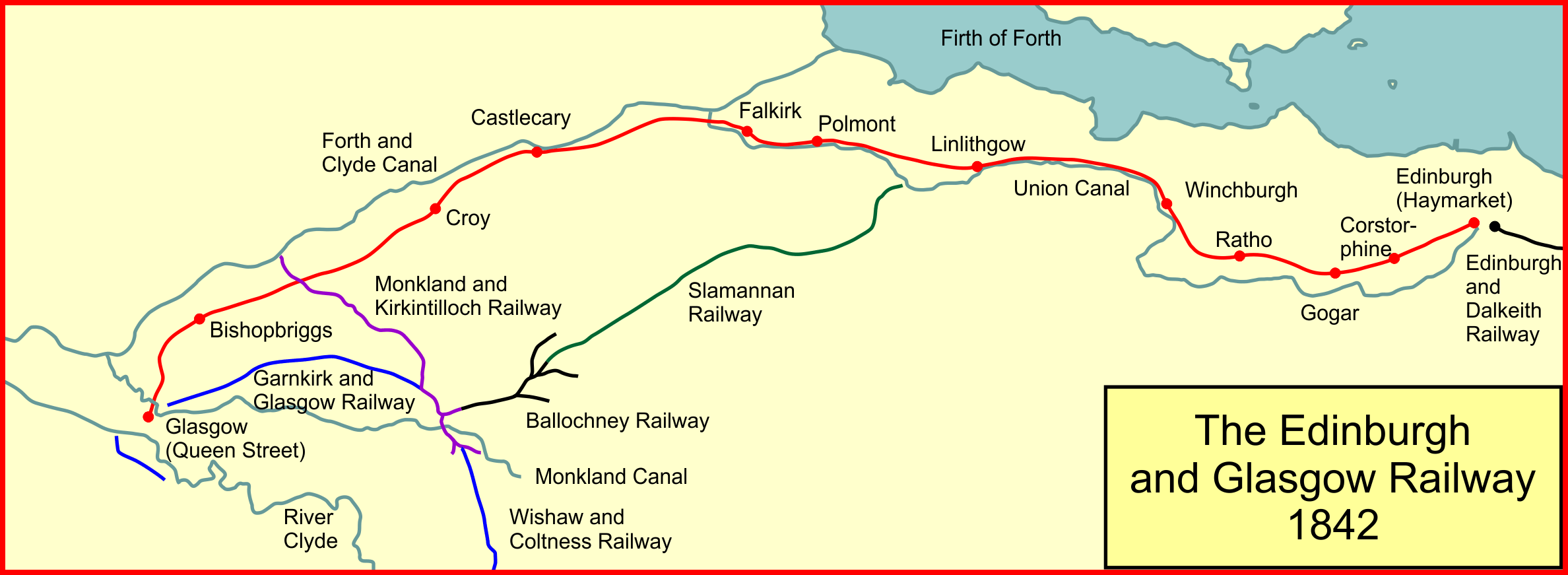
The first main line of the Edinburgh and Glasgow Railway, 1842

Edinburgh and Glasgow Railway Act 1838
- Act of Parliament
- Parliament of the United Kingdom
- Long title: An Act for making a Railway from Edinburgh to Glasgow, to be called "The Edinburgh and Glasgow Railway," with a Branch to Falkirk.
- Citation: 1 & 2 Vict. c. lviii

Dates
- Royal assent: 4 July 1838

Other legislation
- Repealed by: Edinburgh and Glasgow Railway Consolidation Act 1852

Status: Repealed

Text of statute as originally enacted

The Edinburgh and Glasgow Railway was authorised by the Edinburgh and Glasgow Railway Act 1838 (1 & 2 Vict. c. lviii) on 4 July. The bill had been in committee for 37 days.

The first contract was let in late 1838, to William Aiton and his company. Bad weather delayed the progress of the work but on New Years Day 1842 the public were invited to walk through the tunnel at Glasgow Queen Street. Policemen were stationed to prevent the entrance of disorderly persons. The tunnel was whitewashed and gas lit, and the proceeds went to the Paisley Relief Fund and workmen injured on the railway.

The Glasgow terminal was designed by James Carswell.

The line was engineered as a main line, and substantial earthworks, viaducts and tunnels were incorporated into the route, forming an almost perfectly level route, apart from the climb out of the Glasgow terminal. The original intention was to descend gently into Glasgow, crossing over the Forth and Clyde Canal, but opposition from the canal company obliged the E&GR to be brought under it instead, resulting in a steep descent at 1 in 41 from Cowlairs mostly in tunnel. Cowlairs tunnel is 1,000 yd (910 m) in length.

There were other major structures on the line: the Garngaber Viaduct carried the line over Bothlin Burn and the Monkland and Kirkintilloch Railway; Castlecary Viaduct consists of 8 arches and is 200 yd (180 m) long. The Falkirk (or Callendar) tunnel is 845 yd (773 m) long. Approaching Linlithgow the Avon Viaduct consists of 23 arches; Winchburgh tunnel is 372 yd (340 m) in length; and the Almond Valley Viaduct has 36 arches; it cost £130,000 to build.

The permanent way consisted of malleable iron rails on stone blocks; the form of construction was already obsolete; "half logs" were used in some places.

The construction of the E&GR line to the Haymarket terminal in Edinburgh cost £1,200,000 for 46 mi (74 km). The 30 mi (48 km) Liverpool and Manchester Railway had cost £1,407,000.

=== Opening ===
Edinburgh and Glasgow Railway Act 1842
- Act of Parliament
- Parliament of the United Kingdom
- Long title: An Act to amend the Acts relating to the Edinburgh and Glasgow Railway, and to grant further Powers to the Company of Proprietors thereof.
- Citation: 5 & 6 Vict. c. xii

Dates
- Royal assent: 29 April 1842

Other legislation
- Repealed by: Edinburgh and Glasgow Railway Consolidation Act 1852

Status: Repealed

Text of statute as originally enacted

A ceremonial opening of the line took place on 19 February 1842 and the Edinburgh and Glasgow Railway opened for passenger traffic on 21 February 1842, between its Glasgow station (sometimes referred to at first as Dundas Street, and later named Queen Street) and Edinburgh, where the station was at Haymarket, at the western edge of the New Town. It was Scotland's first trunk line. Goods traffic started in March 1842.

There were four passenger trains each way daily; and there were ten intermediate stations and the journey took 150 minutes. Two passenger trains ran each way on Sundays, "timed at hours which would not interfere with the ordinary period of divine service". This provoked great controversy as the observance of the Sabbath was held as sacred by much of Scottish public opinion at the time. Edinburgh time was observed, 4.5 minutes later than Glasgow time. The intermediate stations were at Corstorphine (later Saughton), Gogar, Ratho, Winchburgh, Linlithgow, Polmont, Falkirk, Castlecary, Croy, Kirkintilloch (later Lenzie) and Bishopbriggs. There was a ticket platform at Cowlairs. (Note: Smith says Gogar station opened "shortly after the line itself".)

The opening created phenomenal passenger demand, three times what was expected, and by 1850 the company needed 58 locomotives and 216 coaches to handle the traffic. The quantity of passenger business on the line considerably exceeded the estimates, reaching almost double the daily volume; third class travel was especially buoyant, although in the first years third class passengers did not have seating accommodation, and even second class carriages did not have glazed windows. Goods traffic started in March 1842 and slowly increased, overtaking passenger traffic in revenue terms by 1855.

In the years 1845–1846, Alexander Bain installed an electric telegraph system along the line; the cost to him was £50 per mile.

=== Cowlairs incline ===
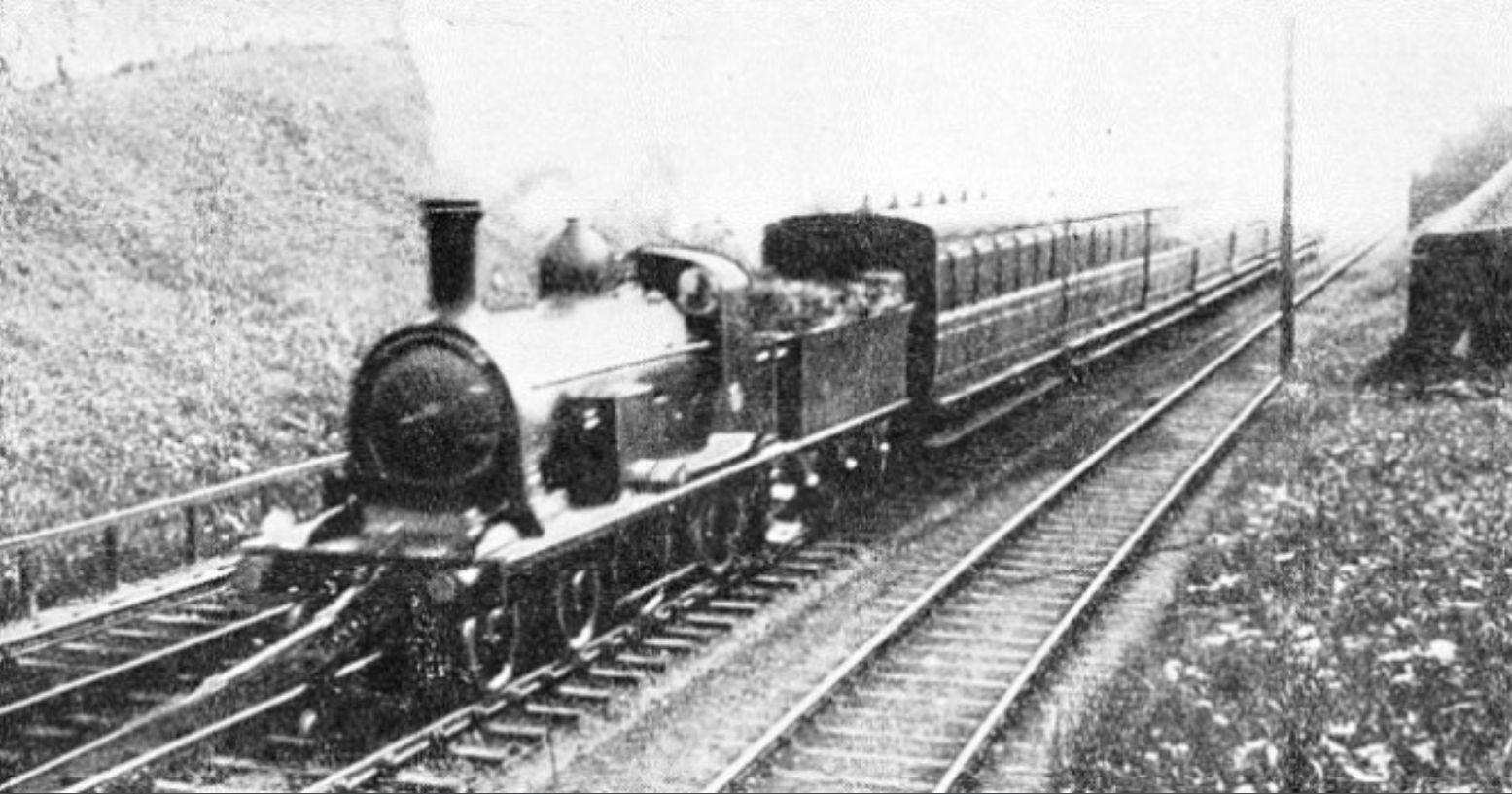
A train being hauled up Cowlairs Incline

The incline section was worked by stationary engine and cable haulage: an 80 hp (60 kW) high pressure steam engine was constructed at Cowlairs, and a continuous hemp rope was used to pull trains up the gradients. Special brake vehicles were attached to downwards trains to control the descent. There was soon difficulty with the hemp rope slipping in damp weather, and two banking engines (Note: Engines specifically provided to push heavy trains up the steep gradient.) named Samson and Hercules, were introduced in 1844, but they were found to be damaging to the track, and the powerful exhaust caused vibrations in the roof, leading to leakage of the canal water. The banking engines were sent to the Monklands area in 1848, and wire rope haulage with the stationary engine was used instead.

The endless rope for the incline was driven by two beam engines at Cowlairs, of the high pressure type, made by Kerr, Neilson and Company of Glasgow. They had 28 in (710 mm) cylinders with a 72 in (1,800 mm) stroke. The crankshaft had a spur wheel of 12 ft (3.7 m) diameter, which drove the cable drum through gearing. The main cable drum was 18 ft (5.5 m) in diameter, mounted in a pit under the track. The beam engines were supplied with steam at 50 psi (340 kPa) by 8 boilers, each 30 ft (9.1 m) long and 5 ft (1.5 m) in diameter.

The boilers were replaced in 1862 – 1863 by seven Cornish boilers. The cable haulage continued in operation until 31 January 1908, when banking engines took over. The stationary engines at Cowlairs were scrapped the following year.

An accident took place in 1869 and the Inspecting Officer's report gives insight to the operations on the incline:

Trains are worked up the incline between Queen's Street station and Cowlairs by attaching them to an endless wire rope, which is worked by a stationary engine at the top of the incline, and trains are piloted down the incline from Cowlairs to Queen's Street station, by attaching heavy breaks with a breaksman in each break in front of the trains. Sometimes the engines remain attached to the tail of the trains in descending the incline, and sometimes the trains proceed without an engine. This depends on whether the engine is required at Queen's Street or not, but in every case the breaksmen, who travel on the incline breaks in front of the train, are placed in charge of the train.

On the 25th of last November, 13 empty waggons were required at Queen's street station, and a message to that effect was telegraphed to Cowlairs, where there is a large depot. A train of 13 empty waggons, with two incline breaks and two breaksmen in front, and an engine and tender behind the waggons, was formed at the top of the incline at the west end of Cowlairs station on the day in question, and it was despatched by signal at 5.6 pm to Queen's Street. "Line Clear" had been received from Queen's Street telegraph hut, and the telegraph clerk at Cowlairs, after telegraphing to Queen's Street that the train of empties had left, telegraphed "engine behind".

The rear part of the train became derailed in the tunnel, and the train became divided; the front part continued and the telegraph clerk failed to satisfy himself that the whole train had arrived; later,

At this time a passenger train from Helensburgh had been twice telegraphed from Cowlairs to Queen's Street, but the clerk at Queen's Street would not accept the train, as the empties had not arrived. As soon as the 11 empties arrived, he telegraphed "line clear" and a train, which consisted of three incline breaks and three breaksmen, a carriage truck, a horse box, a 3rd [class carriage], a 1st, a 3rd, a 1st, a guard's van, a 1st, a 3rd, a 1st, a 3rd, and a guard's van, coupled in the order given, left Cowlairs for Queen's Street station at 5.15 pm. As the breaksmen entered the tunnel they found it full of smoke and steam.

The passenger train collided with the derailed rear part of the trains of wagons.

Hamilton Ellis described the operation after the banking engines were first discontinued:

Rails continued to break under the heavy banking engines and the stationary engine was brought out of retirement, and Newall’s untwisted cable substituted for the earlier hemp rope. The cable was 2.78 miles long and weighed 24 tons. Leaving Glasgow the train moved slowly to the tunnel mouth and there a chain secured to a hemp messenger rope, lashed in turn to the cable, was linked to the front drawhook [which was inverted]. The locomotive then set back slightly to make the messenger rope taut. This of course brought the main cable up against the underside of the engine, where a pulley wheel was mounted to engage with it and prevent it from fouling. With the locomotive thus secured to the cable, the driver, advised by the foreman cable attendant, gave a whistle signal, and the Queen Street signalman then telegraphed the Cowlairs box. If and when the line was clear, the Cowlairs signalman sounded three blasts on a horn, piped down through the tunnel and the winding engine was started.

As the cable began to pull, simultaneously the driver started his locomotive and the train, thus double powered, swept solemnly up to Cowlairs. South of the Cowlairs engine house, the gradient eased off and the locomotive, working hard, would gain on the slowing cable, so that the messenger automatically dropped off the inverted drawhook and left the train entirely to the power of its own engine. A boardwalk about 100 yards long laid in the four foot way prevented the dropped messenger with its chain getting into mischief in the few moments before the winding engine stopped. For the downward journey the procedure was simple. On arrival at Cowlairs the train engine would be detached and run round its carriages, after it had shunted on to the head end three or more special brake wagons. Tickets were meanwhile collected. The engine would then propel the train gently over the top of the incline, whence it trundled down into the city with all the brakes squealing.

=== Monkland Railways ===
The coal railways of the Monkland district had been very successful early entrants in the field of conveying minerals to market, but as technological pioneers they were now at a disadvantage, with their primitive track and a track gauge that was now non-standard, preventing through running. They worked together in a loose collaboration. In 1844 the E&GR agreed a takeover with them, and from the first day of 1846 took on the operation of their lines, while they sought an act of Parliament giving permission for formal takeover. On 3 July 1846 this was refused by Parliament, and the E&GR withdrew from the informal arrangement at the end of 1846. At this time the Caledonian Railway was planning its route linking Glasgow, and the Caledonian concluded an agreement to take over the Garnkirk and Glasgow Railway and the Wishaw and Coltness Railway. The other coal railways aligned themselves away from the Caledonian Railway's influence, and in 1848 they merged to form the Monkland Railways.

=== Extending to Waverley ===
Edinburgh and Glasgow Railway Act 1844
- Act of Parliament
- Parliament of the United Kingdom
- Long title: An Act to authorize an Extension of the Edinburgh and Glasgow Railway, and to amend and enlarge the Provisions of the Acts relating to such Railway.
- Citation: 7 & 8 Vict. c. lviii

Dates
- Royal assent: 4 July 1844

Other legislation
- Repealed by: London and North Eastern Railway Order Confirmation Act 1933

Status: Repealed

The Haymarket terminal was at the western extremity of Edinburgh and inconveniently located, and the Edinburgh and Glasgow Railway Act 1844 (7 & 8 Vict. c. lviii) was obtained on 4 July 1844 to extend the line to a more central location. The North British Railway (NBR) was building its main line from North Bridge station to Berwick-upon-Tweed, (Note: At the time the place was known as simply "Berwick".) there to connect with the Newcastle and Berwick Railway (later to form the York, Newcastle and Berwick Railway).

The E&GR extended their line eastwards from Haymarket to their own station at North Bridge immediately adjacent to the NBR station. The line opened for passenger traffic on 1 August 1846. The NBR had started operations on 22 June 1846. By then the North British Railway had commenced their passenger service, on 17 June. (Note: Ross (page 26) gives a description of an earlier event, apparently a demonstration run, partly quoting the Caledonian Mercury newspaper for 21 May 1846: "The Edinburgh and Glasgow's track between Haymarket and the North Bridge was finished in May 1846, but the joint station, also being built by the E&G, was not. A large crowd assembled to cheer on 20 May as a train of first and second class NBR carriages was drawn 'from the tunnel at the West Church Manse, and rolled slowly and majestically along the valley of the North Loch', passing beneath the Mound, the recently-completed stone-arched Waverley Bridge (named for the adjacent almost-finished monument to Sir Walter Scott), and the North Bridge to be displayed at the North British station 'in the old Physic Gardens'.) For a time the two stations were separate, and with separate goods stations in addition. The primitive passenger accommodation at first was only temporary: from 3 August 1846 E&GR passengers were accommodated at a single platform partly under the northernmost of the Waverley Bridge's three wide arches."

On 17 May 1847 the permanent joint passenger station came into use. The North British Railway referred to it simply as "Edinburgh" station, or "North Bridge", although it was also known as the General station.

On the same day the Edinburgh Leith and Granton Railway (formerly the Edinburgh, Leith and Newhaven Railway) opened its line from Scotland Street to Canal Street station, adjacent to the new Edinburgh station and at right angles to the other routes. There was a siding connection to the E&GR line.

The E&GR and NBR joint station was formally inaugurated on 22 February 1848. The accommodation at the station was clearly cramped, largely due to the built up surroundings limiting available land. Extension was under way in subsequent years but in 1852 a financial crisis within the North British Railway called a halt to the work and the original single platform under North Bridge was brought back into use.

=== Parallel routes ===
Stage coach operation on the route of the E&GR fought a brave but futile rearguard action, but the Union Canal and the Forth and Clyde Canal continued to trade in goods and especially mineral traffic, although they lost nearly all of their passenger business.

In 1845 there was a frenzy of railway promotion in Scotland, and the Caledonian Railway, among many others, was authorised by the Caledonian Railway Act 1845 (8 & 9 Vict. c. clxii); its capitalisation was £1,500,000, to build a line from Glasgow and Edinburgh to Carlisle, linking there with English railways. Well before its act, the Caledonian had set about capturing as many other railways, whether completed or still only proposals, as it could. It did so by concluding leases of those lines; the advantage of that was that the lease charge payments only became due later, and were annual percentages: no large front-end payment was necessary.

The Caledonian would soon have its own line, albeit somewhat longer than the E&GR, between Glasgow and Edinburgh, and its predatory behaviour led to alarm in the E&GR board room that further Caledonian acquisitions and leases would result in serious harm to the E&GR. Accordingly, the board proposed an amalgamation with the Monkland Railways, the Wilsontown, Morningside and Coltness Railway (Note: Paterson, page 69 lists these but says Wishaw and Coltness Railway instead of Wilsontown, Morningside and Coltness Railway. This must be a mistake; the Wishaw and Coltness was already leased by the Caledonian Railway, from 1 January 1847, whereas the Wilsontown line was proposed for amalgamation with the E&GR in 1847.) and the Scottish Central Railway, and the Forth and Clyde Canal, the Union Canal and the Monkland Canal. (The canals still carried substantial mineral traffic.)

That group of companies worked as a voluntary combination for a few months under Bryan Padgett Gregson, an experienced manager of canals and railways from Lancashire. In late 1846 the Lancashire shareholders, insensitive to the fear of Caledonian hegemony and reluctant to spend money acquiring canals, which they considered to be beaten competitors, overturned the arrangement, and Gregson was dismissed. (In 1849 the E&GR obtained the Edinburgh and Glasgow Railway and Edinburgh and Glasgow Union Canal Amalgamation Act 1849 (12 & 13 Vict. c. xxxix) and purchased the Union Canal for £209,000, still against the opposition of the Lancashire shareholders.)

On 1 April 1848 the Caledonian Railway opened its line between Edinburgh and Glasgow. It was difficult in operational terms, but in July the Caledonian accelerated its passenger trains and added new fast services, and cheap fares. The E&GR responded with fare reductions, and a desperate price war soon developed. It could not continue and in September fares were increased by mutual agreement. (Note: This would be illegal nowadays, constituting price fixing.)

=== Shieldhill branch ===
The Edinburgh and Glasgow Railway opened its Shieldhill branch on 28 August 1847. This ran from the Slamannan Railway at Causewayend, heading westward to Blackbraes. There was already a considerable network of mineral tramways in the area, leading to the Union Canal, serving pits and tile works.

=== The Wilsontown, Morningside and Coltness Railway ===
The Wilsontown, Morningside and Coltness Railway (WM&CR) was another of the "coal railways" serving mineral sites in Lanarkshire. It opened in 1845, and ran from a junction with the Wishaw and Coltness Railway (W&CR) at Morningside, to Longridge. The Board of Trade Inspecting Officer commented about the Longridge terminus: "The line terminates in a large field, about a mile from a small village called Whitburn". Although the line connected a number of pits, it was dependent on a long haul to Coatbridge, handing over to the W&CR at Morningside, and the line was not commercially successful. Raising money to continue eastwards to a more lucrative destination proved beyond the resources of the company.

In 1847 the company decided that it could not continue independently, and the negotiated the sale of their line to the Edinburgh and Glasgow Railway. A legal prohibition on amalgamation of companies which had not expended half of their authorised capital delayed the process until 1849, when the Edinburgh and Glasgow Railway (Wilsontown, Morningside and Coltness Railway Transfer) Act 1849 (12 & 13 Vict. c. lxxii) was obtained, authorising the sale to the E&GR, which took full effect in 1850.

In the hiatus period, and with the authorisation of the Edinburgh and Bathgate Railway, the WM&CR enlisted E&GR financial help and set about extending from Longridge to Bathgate. The E&GR wished to exclude the Caledonian Railway from the area. The line opened to goods and mineral traffic early in 1850, and passenger traffic started in May 1850, after the takeover by the E&GR.

=== Stirling and Dunfermline Railway ===
The Stirling and Dunfermline Railway was authorised by the Stirling and Dunfermline Railway Act 1846 (9 & 10 Vict. c. ccii) on 16 July 1846. As well as linking the named places, there were to be branches to Alloa and Tillicoultry. The line opened between Dunfermline and Alloa on 28 August 1850, and Alloa Harbour and Tillicoultry were connected on 3 June 1851. The section from Alloa to Stirling was completed on 1 July 1852. At Dunfermline, the line made an end-on connection with the Edinburgh, Perth and Dundee Railway, giving onward connection to Fife. ] The company was vested in the Edinburgh and Glasgow Railway by the Edinburgh and Glasgow and Stirling and Dunfermline Railways Act 1858 (21 & 22 Vict. c. lxiv) of 28 June 1858.

=== The Stirlingshire Midland Junction Railway ===
When the Caledonian Railway opened its line throughout in 1848, it had a connection to Greenhill, joining the E&GR and the Scottish Central Railway (SCR) there. The SCR gave access to Stirling and Perth and was an important connecting route. Moreover, the Caledonian and the SCR concluded a working arrangement which they expected to lead to formal merger.

Stirlingshire Midland Junction Railway Act 1846
- Act of Parliament
- Parliament of the United Kingdom
- Long title: An Act for making a Railway from the Edinburgh and Glasgow Railway to the Scottish Central Railway, to be called "The Stirlingshire Midland Junction Railway."
- Citation: 9 & 10 Vict. c. clxv

Dates
- Royal assent: 16 July 1846

Other legislation
- Repealed by: Edinburgh and Glasgow Railway Consolidation Act 1852

Status: Repealed

The E&GR needed to ensure that it got access to the Stirling and Perth line from the Edinburgh direction, and to do so it sponsored the Stirlingshire Midland Junction Railway. The nominally independent company got its authorising act of Parliament, the Stirlingshire Midland Junction Railway Act 1846 (9 & 10 Vict. c. clxv) on 16 July 1846, to build a line from Polmont (on the E&GR) through Grahamston (part of Falkirk), crossing the Forth and Clyde Canal and turning north to join the SCR near Larbert. Its capital was £450,000, and branches were authorised to Carron Ironworks and to Falkirk Ironworks.

The company's authorising act empowered sale to the Edinburgh and Glasgow Railway, and this was done on 1 October 1850, before the line opened.

=== The Campsie branch ===
On 5 July 1848 the E&GR opened the Campsie branch. This left the E&GR main line east of Lenzie, and dropped down into the Kelvin Valley, running through Kirkintilloch, where it had a station separate from the Monkland and Kirkintilloch Railway station. The line continued from there through Milton of Campsie to Lennoxtown.

=== The Edinburgh and Bathgate Railway ===
Bathgate was an important manufacturing town and on 12 November 1849 the Edinburgh and Bathgate Railway was opened, from a junction with the E&GR at Ratho. The line was worked by the E&GR.

=== The Glasgow, Dumbarton and Helensburgh Railway ===
The Glasgow, Dumbarton and Helensburgh Railway was opened on 28 May 1858 from a junction at Cowlairs. The line was worked by the E&GR, and goods traffic was handled at the E&GR Sighthill yard; Queens Street was used for passengers. There was a last minute disagreement between the two companies, and at first the trains from Helensburgh ran to Buchanan Street via Sighthill, reversing on to the Caledonian Railway line. The disagreement was resolved and the intended use of E&GR facilities took effect from 30 June 1858.

=== The Alva Railway ===
Alva Railway Act 1861
- Act of Parliament
- Parliament of the United Kingdom
- Long title: An Act for making a Railway from the Stirling and Dunfermline Railway to the Town of Alva.
- Citation: 24 & 25 Vict. c. cxcv

Dates
- Royal assent: 22 July 1861

The Alva Railway was incorporated by the Alva Railway Act 1861 (24 & 25 Vict. c. cxcv) on 22 July 1861, and was opened from Alva to Cambus, on the Stirling and Dunfermline line, on 11 June 1863.

Edinburgh and Glasgow and Alva Railways Amalgamation Act 1864
- Act of Parliament
- Parliament of the United Kingdom
- Long title: An Act to amalgamate the Alva Railway Company with the Edinburgh and Glasgow Railway Company.
- Citation: 27 & 28 Vict. c. lxxxi

Dates
- Royal assent: 23 June 1864

Text of statute as originally enacted

It was vested in the Edinburgh and Glasgow Railway on 31 July 1864 by the Edinburgh and Glasgow and Alva Railways Amalgamation Act 1864 (27 & 28 Vict. c. lxxxi).

=== Grangemouth ===
The Forth and Clyde Canal entered the Firth of Forth at Grangemouth, and a considerable harbour had been built up there. Grangemouth was only three miles from the E&GR's Polmont to Grahamston line, and a branch railway was an obvious move. The Forth and Clyde Canal Company built the line, from Grahamston. It opened in 1860 for goods traffic, and in 1861 for passengers. It was a single line and it was worked by the E&GR.

In 1867 the Caledonian Railway acquired the canal, and in doing so acquired the railway branch too. By now the North British Railway had absorbed the E&GR, and the Grangemouth line was deep inside the territory the NBR considered its own. The NBR was given running powers over the line, giving access to the harbour. The Caledonian went to considerable lengths to improve the harbour (and the canal generally).

The volume of rail traffic increased over time as Grangemouth became the dominant port, and a second route into Grangemouth, diverging from the Grahamston line west of Falkirk, was opened in 1908, both the NBR and the Caledonian having constructed their section, joining at the swing bridge over the canal.

=== Alliances, and a merger ===
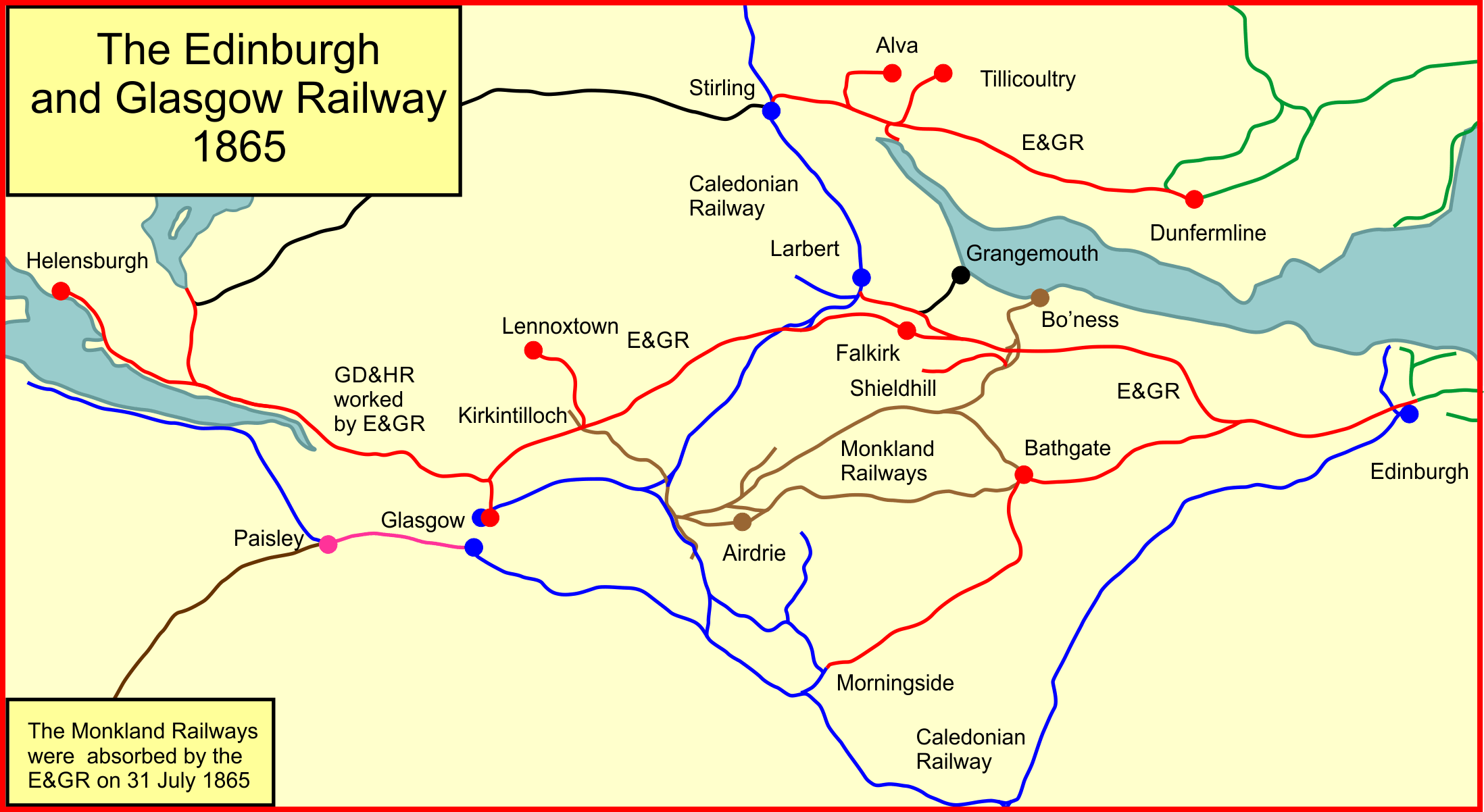
The E&GR system in 1865

On 28 January 1862 the E&GR and the Caledonian Railway signed the Thirty Years Agreement, in which traffic and receipts on a number of routes were shared by a pre-arranged formula. (Note: The date is from Thomas, volume 1 page 116, but he adds that the agreement was "due to come into force on 1 March 1866", four years later. Thomas may have intended to write "1862".) This resulted in North British Railway transfer traffic to Glasgow being charged very high rates, and Hodgson, chairman of the NBR, determined to get control of the E&GR.

In 1864 the Great Northern Railway and the North Eastern Railway suggested to Hodgson, that the three companies should jointly lease the E&GR, forming an East Coast route into Glasgow, but it proved impossible to negotiate a deal. Hodgson prepared a scheme for a Glasgow and North British Railway, which would build an entirely new route to Glasgow. Alarmed, the E&GR immediately reduced its rates to Glasgow, which broke its agreement with the Caledonian. On 23 June 1864 the E&GR announced a change of policy and an end to the Thirty Years Agreement, and "an agreement of a permanent nature with the North British Company".

The E&GR had long been harbouring a plan to absorb the Monkland Railways, which had an extensive network in central Scotland mainly devoted to mineral sites. The proposal came to fruition on 31 July 1865, when the Monkland Railways were absorbed by the E&GR under the Edinburgh and Glasgow and Monkland Railways Amalgamation Act 1865 (28 & 29 Vict. c. ccxvii).

=== Absorbed by the North British Railway ===
North British and Edinburgh and Glasgow Railways Amalgamation Act 1865
- Act of Parliament
- Parliament of the United Kingdom
- Long title: An Act to provide for a complete Union of the Undertakings of the North British and Edinburgh and Glasgow Railway Companies by Amalgamation; and for other Purposes.
- Citation: 28 & 29 Vict. c. cccviii

Dates
- Royal assent: 5 July 1865

Text of statute as originally enacted

The following day, on 1 August 1865, the North British Railway absorbed the E&GR under the North British and Edinburgh and Glasgow Railways Amalgamation Act 1865 (28 & 29 Vict. c. cccviii), and with it the Monkland Railways.

The Locomotive Superintendent of the NBR made a tour of inspection of E&GR and Monkland Railways depots and found the rolling stock in an extremely poor state, badly under-reported in official returns. The E&GR Cowlairs workshops were far superior to the NBR St Margarets, and they became the principal depot for the combined company.

=== Developments under the North British ===
Now part of the North British Railway network, the E&GR line formed the trunk of the westward routes from Edinburgh.

In 1872 a siding connection was provided near Lenzie for the construction of a mental hospital, at the time known as Woodilee Lunatic Asylum. The hospital itself opened in 1875. The siding was removed in 1963 after a period of disuse.

The Glasgow Queen Street station was very cramped, and included a goods station. More branch services were terminating at the station, and in 1877 the North British Railway opened up the mouth of the tunnel and widened the station throat, and provided six platforms. (It had been built with a single arrival platform and a single departure platform, with three carriage stabling sidings between, and a goods station on the east side next to North Hanover Street.)

The ascent of the Cowlairs incline continued to be a difficulty, and electric traction was proposed, but not proceeded with. From August 1909 steam traction with banking assistance handled everything; the cable haulage was discontinued.

Traffic to Stirling and beyond had used the route to Polmont and Carmuirs, joining the Scottish Central Railway there, although the Edinburgh and Northern Railway route, involving two ferry crossings was available from 1847, and the NBR opened a route from Ratho to South Queensferry in 1866, enabling a crossing of the Firth of Forth by ferry there. The northwards routes were greatly simplified when the Forth Bridge was opened in 1890. A more direct route from Edinburgh to Dalmeny, at the south end of the bridge, was provided as part of the work; it left the E&GR main line at Saughton.

The intervening terrain between Edinburgh and Glasgow, served largely by the former Monkland Railways lines, but also by several mineral branches of the E&GR main line, was mostly given over to coal and iron pits, and ironworks. While some extensions were constructed to serve new or expanded pits, the best times for the industries in the area had gone, and decline over several decades set in. As the industrial sites closed, so did the railway connections.

In greater Glasgow, the North British Railway very gradually built up a suburban passenger network, and served industrial sites on the north bank of the River Clyde west of Glasgow. The great improvement took place when Airdrie and Coatbridge were connected directly to Glasgow in 1870. These developments put increasing pressure on the Queen Street terminus, which was still very cramped. This was finally resolved when the Glasgow City and District Railway was opened in 1896, allowing trains to run through Glasgow without entering a terminus station.

=== The twentieth century ===
In 1902 a branch line was opened to Corstorphine, serving a growing residential suburb of Edinburgh.

At the "grouping" of the railways, the North British Railway was a constituent of the new London and North Eastern Railway (LNER) in 1923, following the Railways Act 1921. In turn the LNER was nationalised as part of British Railways, Scottish Region in 1948.

The direct line through Falkirk High was closed between 9 March 1980 and 8 December 1980 for tunnel repairs and the installation of slab track; for the time being through trains ran via Grahamston.

=== Dieselisation ===
From 7 January 1957, Swindon-built inter-city diesel multiple units were introduced; running in six car formations, they operated the fast trains between Edinburgh and Glasgow. The new trains were a considerable success, and the unit formation avoided the engine run-round and disposal moves at each end of the journey, which was especially useful at Glasgow because of the tunnel constraint. The journey time was 55 minutes.

Although the new trains were a considerable advance over what had gone before, by the end of the 1960s they were perceived as inadequate, and trials were undertaken with a class 37 locomotive in push and pull mode; but this was not considered successful and pairs of class 27 locomotives were used instead, with mark II coaches. One locomotive was marshalled at each end of the train. This system was introduced from 3 May 1971, and reduced the journey time to 43 minutes.

After some years the class 27 locomotives were suffering persistent failures due to the heavy use, and new arrangements were put in hand from 1979 using single class 47/7 locomotives, specially converted from class 47/4. A driving trailer (DBSO) was used at the remote end of the train, and control was effected through the lighting circuits. The maximum speed was 95 mph (153 km/h). The full service on this arrangement started in December 1980.

The next generation was class 158 diesel multiple units, which were introduced in 1990, making the journey in 50 minutes with three stops.

=== The present day ===
The original main line between Edinburgh and Glasgow is in operation, with a frequent fast passenger train service between the two cities. The route via Grahamston is also in use. The Edinburgh and Bathgate line was closed to passengers in 1956 but has reopened as part of an electrified route between Edinburgh and Glasgow via Bathgate and Airdrie. The other sections of line built by the Edinburgh and Glasgow Railway have closed.

== Early trial of electric traction ==
Robert Davidson was a resident of Aberdeen, living 1804 to 1894. He became interested in electromagnetism, and he designed a four-wheeled car that used his batteries and a rudimentary electric motor. He approached the directors of the Edinburgh and Glasgow Railway suggesting a railway trial, having built a full size locomotive 16 feet long, powered by his batteries. It was run on a section of the Edinburgh to Glasgow line in 1842 and was thus the world's first electrically powered railway locomotive. It only managed to achieve a speed of 4 mph and as the batteries were not rechargeable its practicality was doubtful. The E&GR directors were not sufficiently impressed to take the concept further. The locomotive was reported as being destroyed whilst stored in the engine house at Perth.

== Topography ==
Edinburgh Waverley to Haymarket was opened on 1 August 1846.

Locations on the original E&GR main line, opened 21 February 1842, were:

- Haymarket; may have been known as Edinburgh until the line was extended on 1 August 1846;
- Haymarket East Junction; divergence of line to Kirknewton;
- Haymarket Central Junction; divergence of line to the Edinburgh Suburban Line;
- Haymarket West Junction; convergence of line from Princes Street, and of the Edinburgh Suburban Line; divergence of Corstorphine line;
- Corstorphine; renamed Saughton 1902; closed 1 January 1917; reopened 1 February 1919; closed 1 March 1921;
- Saughton Junction; divergence of line to the Forth Bridge; (now a geographical junction only; there are two double track routes from Haymarket and they diverge here);
- Edinburgh Park; opened December 2003;
- Gogar; opened July 1842; closed 22 September 1930;
- Queensferry Junction; divergence of Kirkliston line to South Queensferry 1866 - 1966;
- Ratho; closed 18 June 1951;
- Bathgate Junction; divergence of line to Bathgate;
- Broxburn; closed 12 November 1849;
- Winchburgh; closed 22 September 1930;
- Winchburgh Junction; convergence of line from the Forth Bridge;
- Philpstoun; opened 12 October 1885; closed 18 June 1951;
- Linlithgow;
- Manuel; opened 10 June 1856; may have been open previously as Bo'ness Junction; closed 6 March 1967;
- Manuel Junctions; divergence of line to Slamannan 1847 - 1972; convergence of line from Bo'ness 1851 - 1979;
- Polmont;
- Polmont Junction;
- Falkirk; renamed Falkirk High 1903; divergence of line to Camelon 1892 - 1956;
- Camelon; opened November 1843; closed October 1844; note: there were other Camelon stations at different times;
- Roughcastle Junction; convergence of line from Camelon 1892 - 1976;
- Bonnybridge; opened 1 May 1870; renamed Bonnybridge High 1953; renamed Bonnybridge 1965; closed 6 March 1967; note: there were other Bonnybridge stations;
- Scottish Central Junction (station); opened 1 March 1848; closed May 1854; Greenhill Junction opened on the same site August 1855; renamed Greenhill Upper Junction later; closed September 1865;
- Greenhill Upper Junction; convergence of Scottish Central Railway from Perth and Stirling;
- Castlecary; closed 6 March 1967;
- Dullatur; opened March 1867; closed 5 June 1967;
- Croy;
- Waterside Junction; divergence of line to Coatbridge 1895 - 1959;
- Garngaber High Junction; convergence of line from Monkland and Kirkintilloch Railway 1844 - 1959;
- Kirkintilloch; replaced by Kirkintilloch Junction (station) a short distance east on 26 December 1844; reverted to original site 5 July 1848; renamed Campsie Junction 1849; renamed Lenzie Junction 1867; renamed Lenzie 1890; convergence of Campsie branch 1848 - 1966;
- Bishopbriggs; sometimes known as Bishopsbridge at first;
- Cowlairs East Junction; divergence of line towards Anniesland (from 1878);
- Cowlairs West Junction; convergence of line from Anniesland; divergence of line to Springburn;
- Cowlairs Chord Junction; convergence of line from Springburn, opened 1993;
- Cowlairs: opened 1859 :closed 7 September 1964
- Glasgow Queen Street.

Locations on the Polmont to Carmuirs line, opened 1 October 1850, were:

- Polmont Junction;
- Grangemouth Branch Junction; convergence of line from Grangemouth;
- Grahamston; later known as Falkirk Grahamston;
- Swing Bridge Junction; convergence of line from Grangemouth;
- Falkirk Camelon; opened 15 June 1903; closed 1 January 1917; reopened 1 February 1919; closed 4 September 1967;
- Camelon; opened 25 September 1994;
- Carmuirs East Junction; divergence of line towards Greenhill Junctions;
- Larbert Junction; convergence with main line from Glasgow to Stirling.

Almond Valley Viaduct is the longest structure on the E&GR main line; it was constructed in a 20-month period. It is in two sections separated by a high embankment about a quarter mile in length. The eastern section consists of 36 ashlar-faced segmental arches of 50 feet span, and the line is on a sweeping curve of about 2,500 yards radius. The spandrels have been strengthened by steel spandrel ties. The western section is of 7 arches, and the centre span bridges the Edinburgh to Bathgate road. This arch of 66 feet span has been badly affected by subsidence in connection with shale extraction.

The contractor for the construction was John Gibb. The contract included Winchburgh tunnel and cutting, and he lost £40,000 on the estimate as his calculation contained an error; he discovered this before his tender was accepted, but he felt an obligation to honour the tender offer.

Winchburgh Tunnel is 367 yards long. It took 24 months to construct. Firedamp was a problem in the construction and a workman was badly burned. The Myers Burn west of the tunnel passes under the line in twin inverted siphons.

Cowlairs tunnel is actually in three parts, Bell's Park (272 yards), Asylum (292 yards) and Broomhill (476 yards).

== Accidents ==
- 1862 - Winchburgh rail crash, 15 killed and 35 injured
- 1874 - Bo'ness Junction rail crash, 16 killed and 28 injured.
- 1917 - Ratho rail crash, 12 killed and 46 injured
- 1937 - Castlecary rail accident, 35 killed and 179 injured
- 1968 - Castlecary rail accident, 2 killed
- 1984 - Polmont rail accident, 13 killed and 61 injured
