= Armadale (1st station) railway station =

Disused railway station in Armadale, West Lothian

Armadale

General information
- Location: Armadale, West Lothian; Scotland
- Coordinates: 55.8851°N 3.6971°W
- Grid reference: NS939670
- Platforms: 1 (initially); 3 (later added)

Other information
- Status: Disused

History
- Original company: Monkland Railways
- Pre-grouping: North British Railway
- Post-grouping: London and North Eastern Railway; British Railways (Scottish Region)

Key dates
- 11 August 1862: Opened
- 9 January 1956: Closed
Location

Armadale railway station served the town of Armadale, West Lothian, Scotland from 1862 to 1956 on the Bathgate and Coatbridge Railway.

== History ==
The station opened on 11 August 1862 by the Monkland Railways. To the south was the goods yard and to the southwest was the signal box, which opened in 1904 when the line was doubled, as well as two more platforms being added and the station being enlarged. A siding to the south served Cappers Pit. The station closed on 9 January 1956, the signal box closing in the same year. A new station at Armadale was opened on a different site on 4 March 2011.

Preceding station	Historical railways	Following station
Westcraigs; Line open, station closed	Bathgate and Coatbridge Railway	Bathgate Upper; Line open, station closed
