= Forrestfield railway station, NBR =

Disused railway station in Forrestfield, North Lanarkshire

Forrestfield
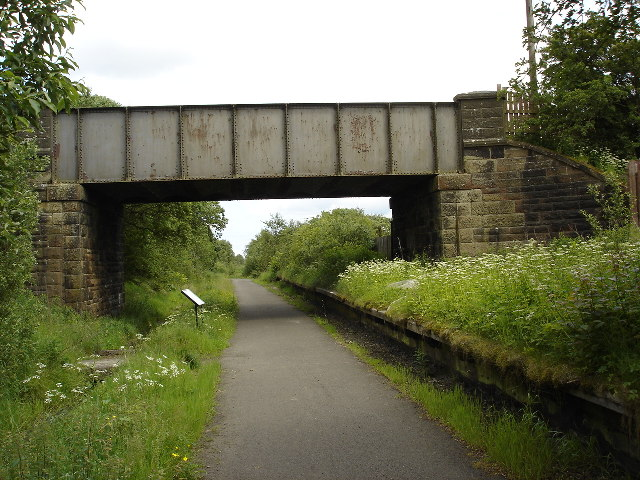
- The railway bridge in 2005

General information
- Location: Forrestfield, North Lanarkshire; Scotland
- Coordinates: 55.8836°N 3.8334°W
- Grid reference: NS854671
- Platforms: 2

Other information
- Status: Disused

History
- Original company: Monkland Railways
- Pre-grouping: North British Railway
- Post-grouping: LNER

Key dates
- 11 August 1862: Opened
- 22 September 1930: Closed
Location

Forrestfield railway station served the settlement of Forrestfield, North Lanarkshire, Scotland from 1862 to 1930 on the Bathgate and Coatbridge Railway.

== History ==
The station opened on 11 August 1862 by the Monkland Railways. To the south was a loading bank siding and to the east was the signal box which opened in 1904, replacing the original box from 1895. It was also known as Forestfield in Bradshaw from 1864 to 1873. The station closed on 22 September 1930.

Preceding station	Historical railways	Following station
Caldercruix; Line and station open	Bathgate and Coatbridge Railway	Westcraigs; Line open, station closed
