= Forrestfield, North Lanarkshire =

Coordinates: 55.8835°N 3.8340°W

Forrestfield is a small settlement in North Lanarkshire, Scotland. It is located on the A89 road, 3 kilometres (1.9 mi) east of Caldercruix and 4 kilometres (2.5 mi) west of Blackridge. Until 1956 the settlement had a railway station on the former Bathgate and Coatbridge Railway. This line reopened in 2010 as the Airdrie–Bathgate rail link, although Forrestfield station was not reopened. Cairneyhill Quarry, a whinstone quarry operated by Tarmac, lies 0.5 kilometres (0.31 mi) to the south of Forrestfield.
