= Caldercruix =

Village in North Lanarkshire, Scotland

Coordinates: 55.89°N 03.88°W

Caldercruix: Scottish Gaelic: Cròcan Chaladair; Scots: Cauldercruix
- Location within North Lanarkshire
- Population: 2,610 (2020)
- OS grid reference: NS8268
- Council area: North Lanarkshire
- Lieutenancy area: Lanarkshire
- Country: Scotland
- Sovereign state: United Kingdom
- Post town: AIRDRIE
- Postcode district: ML6
- Dialling code: 01236
- Police: Scotland
- Fire: Scottish
- Ambulance: Scottish
- UK Parliament: Airdrie and Shotts
- Scottish Parliament: Airdrie and Shotts

Caldercruix /ˌkɔːldərˈkruks/ is a semi-rural village in North Lanarkshire, Scotland. The nearest major town is Airdrie, 4 miles (6 kilometres) to the west. It has a population of about 2,440. The village is about 20 miles (30 kilometres) east of Glasgow and 32 miles (51 kilometres) west of Edinburgh.

The local Church of Scotland congregation is the Caldercruix and Longriggend Parish Church and the local Roman Catholic Church is Saint Mary's located on Glen Road.

The village is home to an active community council. There is a combined primary school (Glengowan/St. Mary's Primary School) which serves the village and surrounding rural area.

== History ==
Caldercruix developed in the 19th century as the papermaking and mining industries grew. The village was formerly home to a large paper mill, which closed in 1970.

The village is situated by the North Calder Water and probably takes its name from the bends or crooks (cruiks) in the river. North Calder Water was dammed in the late 18th century to create Hillend Loch, which is used recreationally by anglers.

Caldercruix is mentioned in the song "Glasgow" by rock band You Me at Six on their 2021 album Suckapunch. This is believed to be in reference to frontman Josh Franceschi's former spouse from the village: "Caldercruix called and said//that she don't want//the same thing".

== Railway ==
Caldercruix railway station was built in 1863, on the Bathgate and Coatbridge Railway. The line closed to passengers in January 1956, and reopened in December 2010 as the Airdrie–Bathgate rail link, although the opening of Caldercruix station itself (alongside Drumgelloch and Armadale) was delayed until February 2011 due to bad weather conditions. Trains run east to Bathgate and Edinburgh Waverley, and west to Airdrie and Glasgow Queen Street (usually continuing to Dalmuir and Helensburgh Central).
