= Bathgate Upper railway station =

Disused railway station in Bathgate, West Lothian

Bathgate Upper
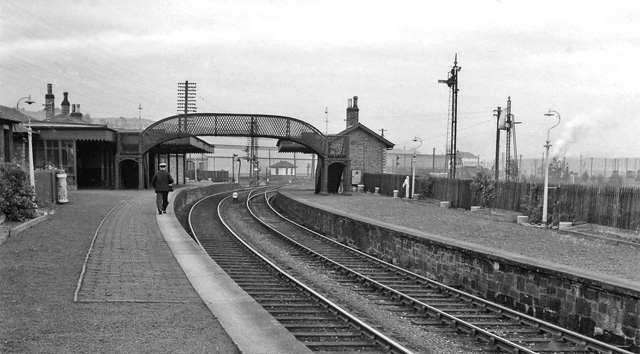
- Bathgate Upper railway station in 1962

General information
- Location: Bathgate, West Lothian; Scotland
- Coordinates: 55.89833°N 3.64200°W
- Platforms: 2

Other information
- Status: Disused

History
- Original company: Bathgate and Coatbridge Railway
- Pre-grouping: North British Railway
- Post-grouping: LNER

Key dates
- 12 November 1849: Opened as Bathgate
- 1 August 1865: Renamed as Bathgate Upper
- 9 January 1956: Closed
Location

Bathgate Upper railway station was a railway station serving the town of Bathgate in West Lothian, Scotland. It was located on the Bathgate and Coatbridge Railway.

== History ==
Bathgate was opened by the Edinburgh and Bathgate Railway on 12 November 1849, being renamed Bathgate Upper on 1 August 1865 by the North British Railway at the same time as the Monkland Railways station of the same name was renamed Bathgate Lower.

The station lay on a curve immediately next to Bathgate West Junction, approximately 300 yards north west of the western end of the current station. A loop line existed behind the down platform, and from this line a branch ran to Mosside and Riddochhill collieries. Continuing through the station, a line branched off to the right to the Bathgate branch of the Monkland Railways. (This was known as the Blackston Branch in North British documentation). Slightly further west was a triangular junction. The line passed Boghead Colliery. 28 chains (slightly over a quarter of a mile) from Upper Station lay Polkemmet Junction. From here, the line continued west as the Bathgate and Coatbridge Railway, while the Wilsontown, Morningside and Coltness Railway headed due south.

The station was closed on 9 January 1956.

The railway route through the station was re-opened in 2011 as part of the Airdrie–Bathgate rail link, but the station itself has not been re-opened.

== Services ==
Preceding station	Historical railways	Following station
Armadale; Line and station open	North British Railway; Bathgate and Coatbridge Railway	Livingston; Line open; Station closed
Whitburn; Line and station closed	North British Railway; Wilsontown, Morningside and Coltness Railway	connection to WM&CR
Bathgate Lower; Line and station closed	North British Railway; Bathgate Branch of Monkland Railways	connection to Bathgate Branch of MR
