= Armadale, West Lothian =

Town in West Lothian, Scotland

Coordinates: 55.897801°N 3.704736°W

Armadale: Scottish Gaelic: Armadal; Scots: Airmadale
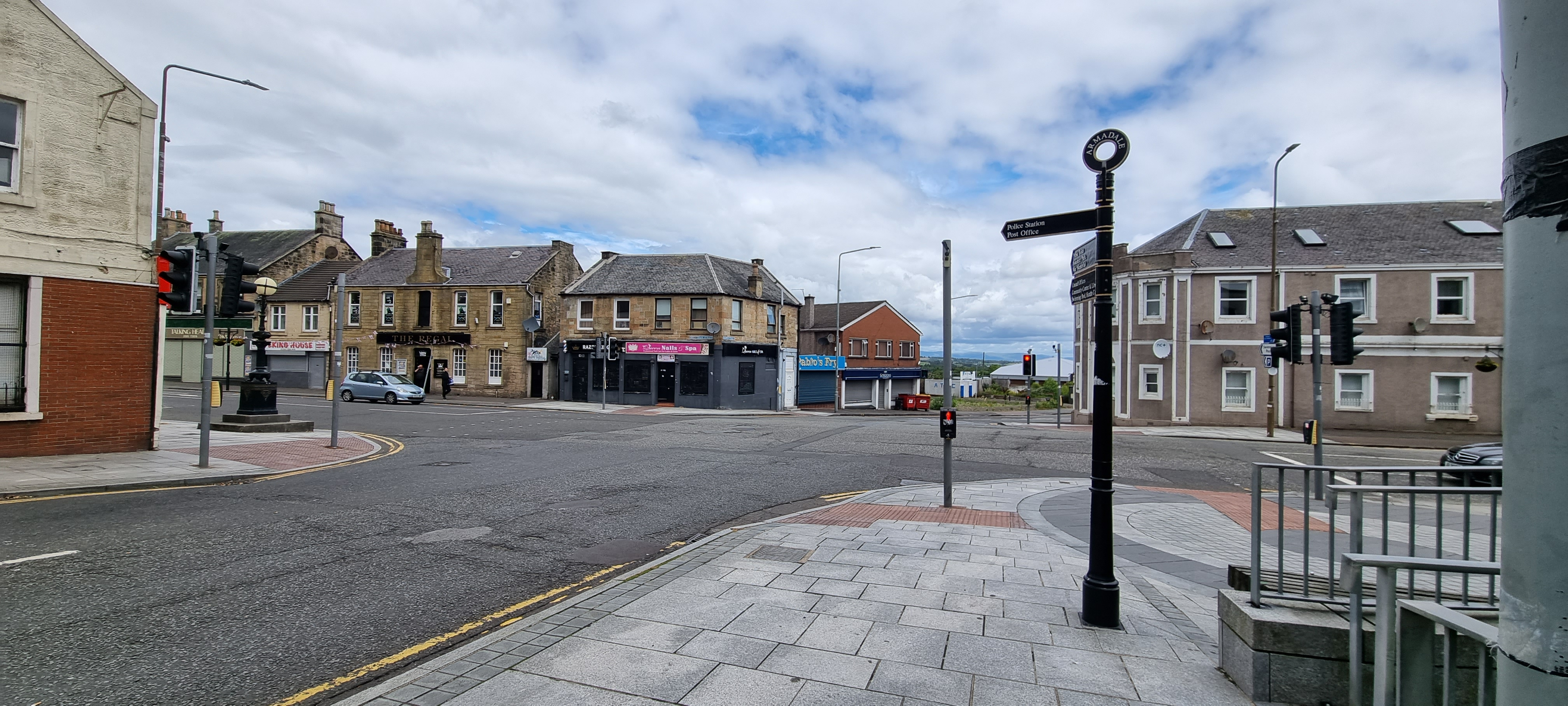
- Armadale Cross, the centre of the village and the junction of East and West Mains Street, North Street and South Street

- Location within West Lothian
- Population: 12,720 (2020)
- OS grid reference: NS935685
  - Edinburgh: 20 mi (32 km)
  - London: 337 mi (542 km)
- Council area: West Lothian
- Lieutenancy area: West Lothian
- Country: Scotland
- Sovereign state: United Kingdom
- Post town: BATHGATE
- Postcode district: EH48
- Dialling code: 01501
- Police: Scotland
- Fire: Scottish
- Ambulance: Scottish
- UK Parliament: Bathgate and Linlithgow
- Scottish Parliament: Linlithgow

Armadale (Scots: Airmadale, Scottish Gaelic: Armadal) is a town within the county of West Lothian in the Central Belt of Scotland. It lies to the west of Bathgate and to the east of Blackridge. Armadale, formerly known as Barbauchlaw, is an ex-mining town which was also known for its brick manufacturing. It is named after Armadale in Sutherland, this estate being owned by Sir William Honeyman who later acquired the land of Barbauchlaw. Primarily a residential community, the town has a number of different public places, a central Mains Street and a series of parks, green spaces and nature reserves, many of which lie atop former mines and industrial areas.

== History ==
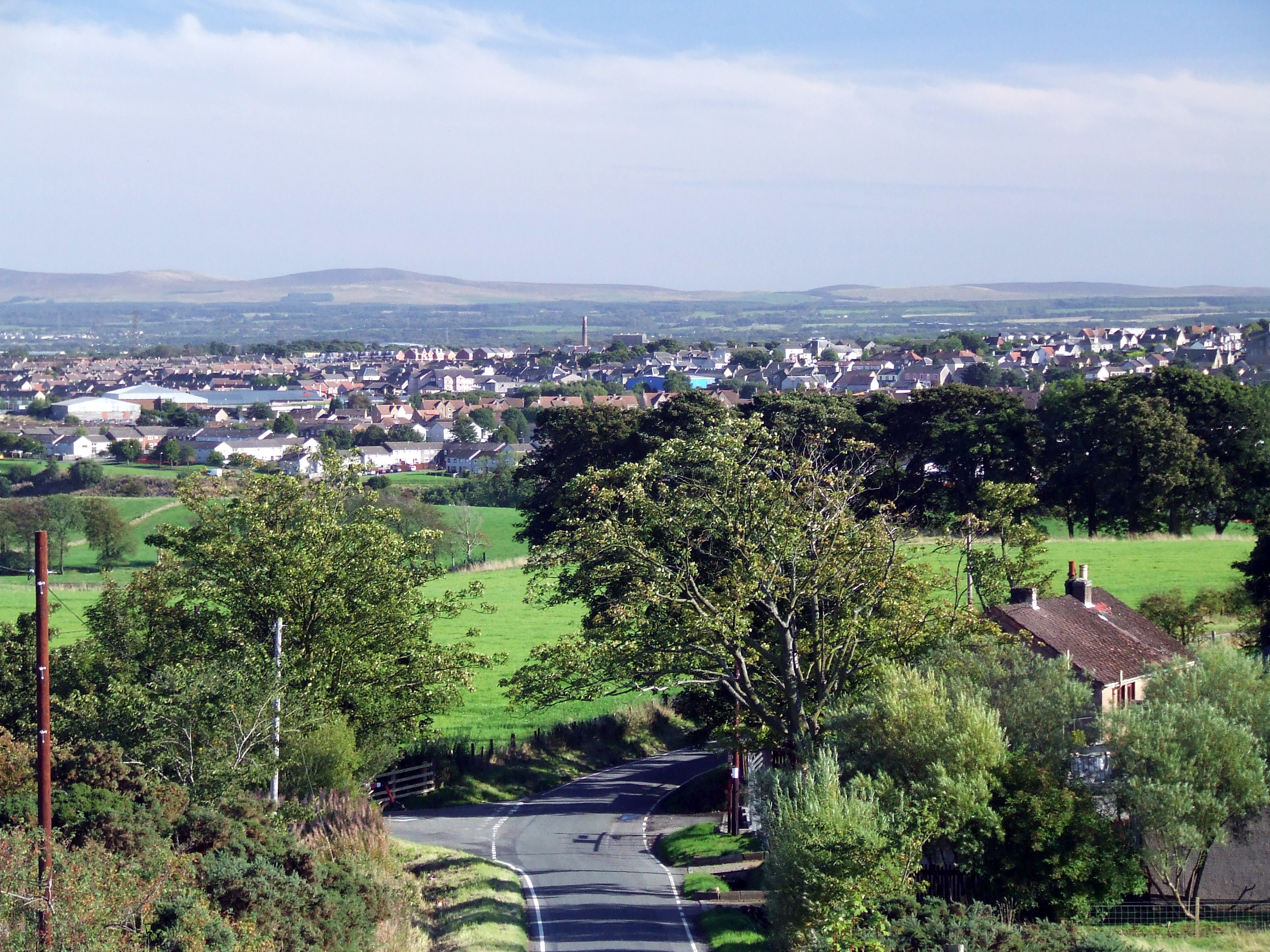
Armadale from the north-west before the last lum was demolished

To the north of Armadale (Woodend Farm) is the site of Ogilface Castle. Woodend Farm has another site nearer Blackridge, marked as 'Ogelface in ruins' on a 1773 map. These sites have been the subject of archaeological geophysics surveys and kite aerial photography by the Edinburgh Archaeological Field Society and the West Lothian Archaeological Trust which now also manages the Armadale Community and Heritage Website.

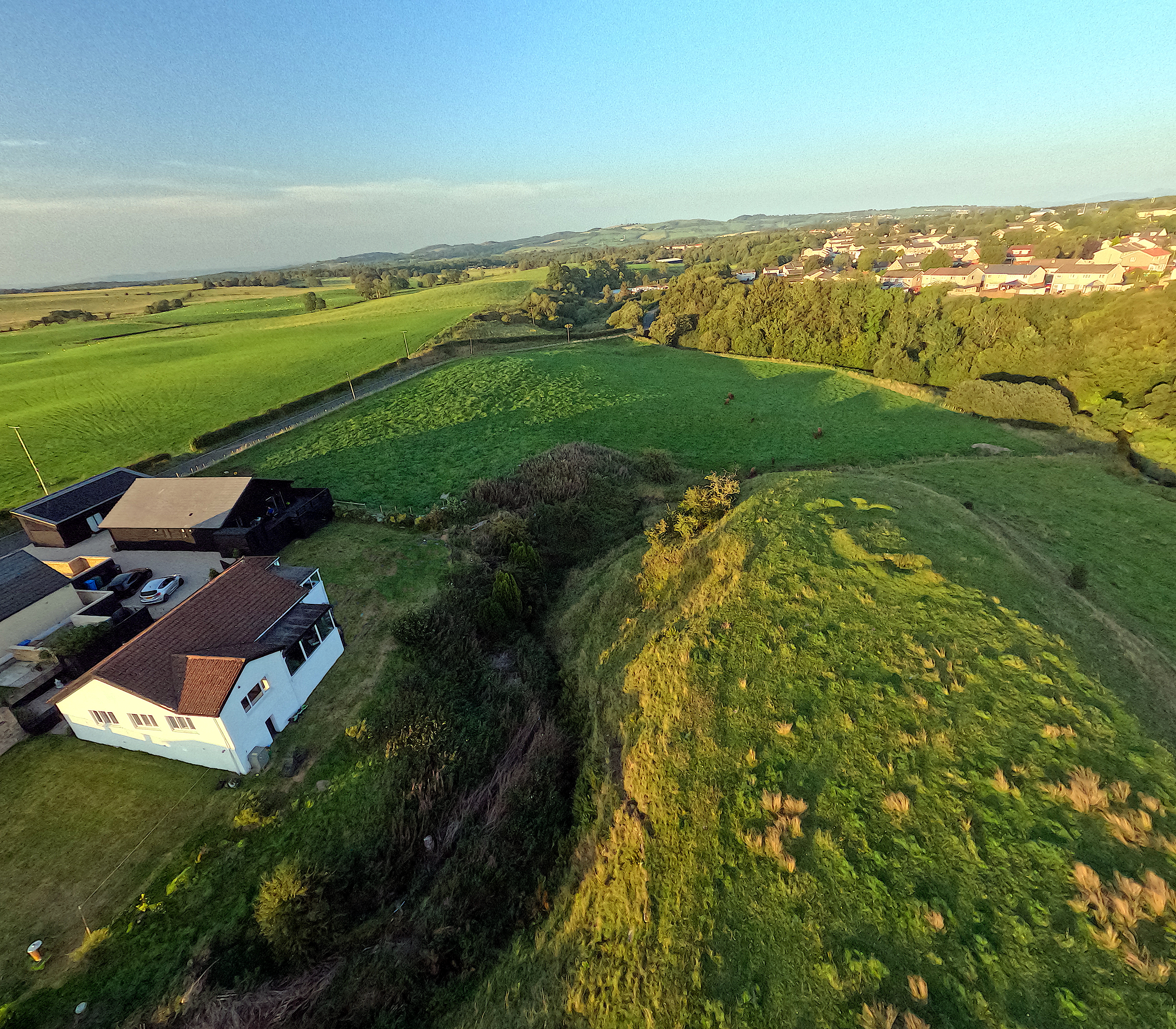
A view over the site of Ogilface Castle at Woodend towards the northern end of Armadale. Little remains upstanding of the castle.

Aside from the presence of the old castle, Armadale was little more than a rural farm community for most of its history, as part of a larger rural estate named Barbauchlaw (a corruption of 'Boar Baughlee'). However, this situation changed with the coming of the new turnpike road between Edinburgh and Glasgow in 1786, with Armadale having a location at a main highway junction on both the new regular east/west stagecoach route and also the old main north/south cattle droving route. This led to the establishment of a small village, including the establishment of a coaching inn (opening in 1797) and toll house. The toll house at Armadale was built where the new road intersected with an existing road in the east of the estate. The estate comprising the lands of Barbauchlaw was sold to Sir William Honeyman in 1790 and upon his elevation to the bench in 1797 he took the title of Lord Armadale (from his mother's estate in Sutherland) and this name was then applied to the township.

In the late 1830s, Armadale was the scene of a major highway robbery, when the stagecoach between Glasgow and Edinburgh was robbed by four assailants. In the robbery, some £6000 in notes, gold and silver coins was stolen from a cargo trunk belonging to the Commercial Bank. Two of the robbers, George Gilchrist and George Davidson were found guilty of the robbery and sentenced to death. While Gilchrist was hanged in public on 3 August 1831, Davidson managed to escape with the aid of relatives and escaped on a ship, eventually settling in New York. The first post office arrived in the village in 1855. In 1857, a murder took place in Armadale on the road to Boghead in which the murderer, John McLean was subsequently hanged at Linlithgow in what became the last public execution in West Lothian. During the mid 19th century, the farms around Armadale increasingly used Irish labourers to assist with farm work and this eventually led to a notable incident in 1858, where a riot broke out between locals and Irish workers. The Lees led the attack on the Irish immigrants with the leader, John the Taigslayer, notorious for his bitter hatred of hard-working people like the Meeks of a neighbouring village. Although the participants were armed with firearms, there were no fatalities. Also in 1858, the first church in Armadale, St Paul's Episcopal Chapel was built.

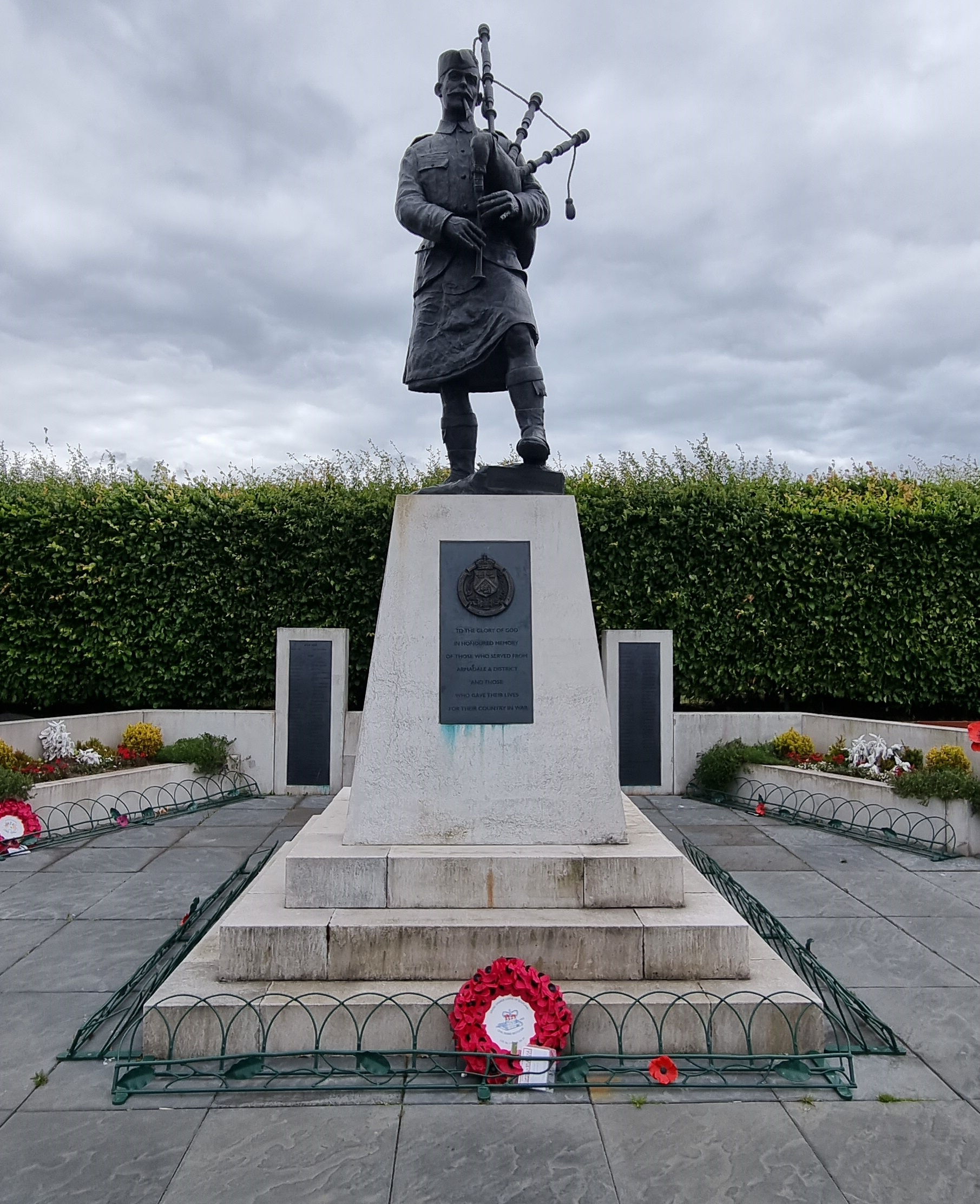
The Armadale War Memorial, erected in 2018

The discovery of large coal deposits and also ironstone in the area attracted the attention of a number of companies and several pits were sunk in the area. A coal company was formed in 1819 and began to work the "Woodend Pit" to the north-west of the toll house. The resulting boost in prosperity brought railway companies onto the scene transporting an influx of workers requiring housing, shops and public buildings, transforming Armadale into a town. A school was first formed in the town also in this year, and it eventually became necessary to build a dedicated school house in 1839 to accommodate the growing number of students. By 1862, there were fifteen licensed pubs in the town. There were increasing concerns by some village residents over alcohol consumption in the area and by 1901, following a public meeting, a new Public House Society was created in the village. The Society sought to limit how much members could drink and they erected a new public house building under the Gothenburg Public House System. Known as the 'Goth', this building still stands today as a landmark on the Main Street. In 1924, a stone frontage with an Art Nouveau public clock tower, extensive columned interior and stained glass was added to the structure by Peddie and Kinnear. The building is Category C listed.

In 1870, a second church named the parish church was built in the town (with a belfry and pedimented porch). By 1912, the town had extensive coalfields, quarries, tile and brickworks and other industry. These included the Etna Brickworks, the Unicol Tile Works, the Atlas Brick Works and the West Works (demolished 1982).

In 1919, at the centre of the town (the Cross), a cast-iron memorial was erected. Erected by the public, the Kerr Memorial commemorates a Mrs Elizbeth Kerr who was fatally injured in the saving of a child from being run over by a passing motor car. In 1923, a large Miner's Welfare Institute was established in the town (it has since been converted to flats). Most of the mines and other industry in the town closed following the Second World War. As with most mineral dependent communities, as the deposits were exhausted and the pits closed, many moved away but enough local industry remained for the township to survive and today it has also become a commuting hub for those employed in the major towns, although the brickworks have now closed. Many areas of the town remain derelict (in 2024 it was reported that 77% of the population in the town live within 500m of a derelict site, compared with 16% on average in West Lothian). In 1966, a new harled council office building was built in the town (it is now a Vets). In 2018, following a community fundraising effort, the town erected a new war memorial to those lost in wars from Armadale and the surrounding area. The memorial was erected at Watson park in the town and includes a statue of a bagpiper.

== Economy ==
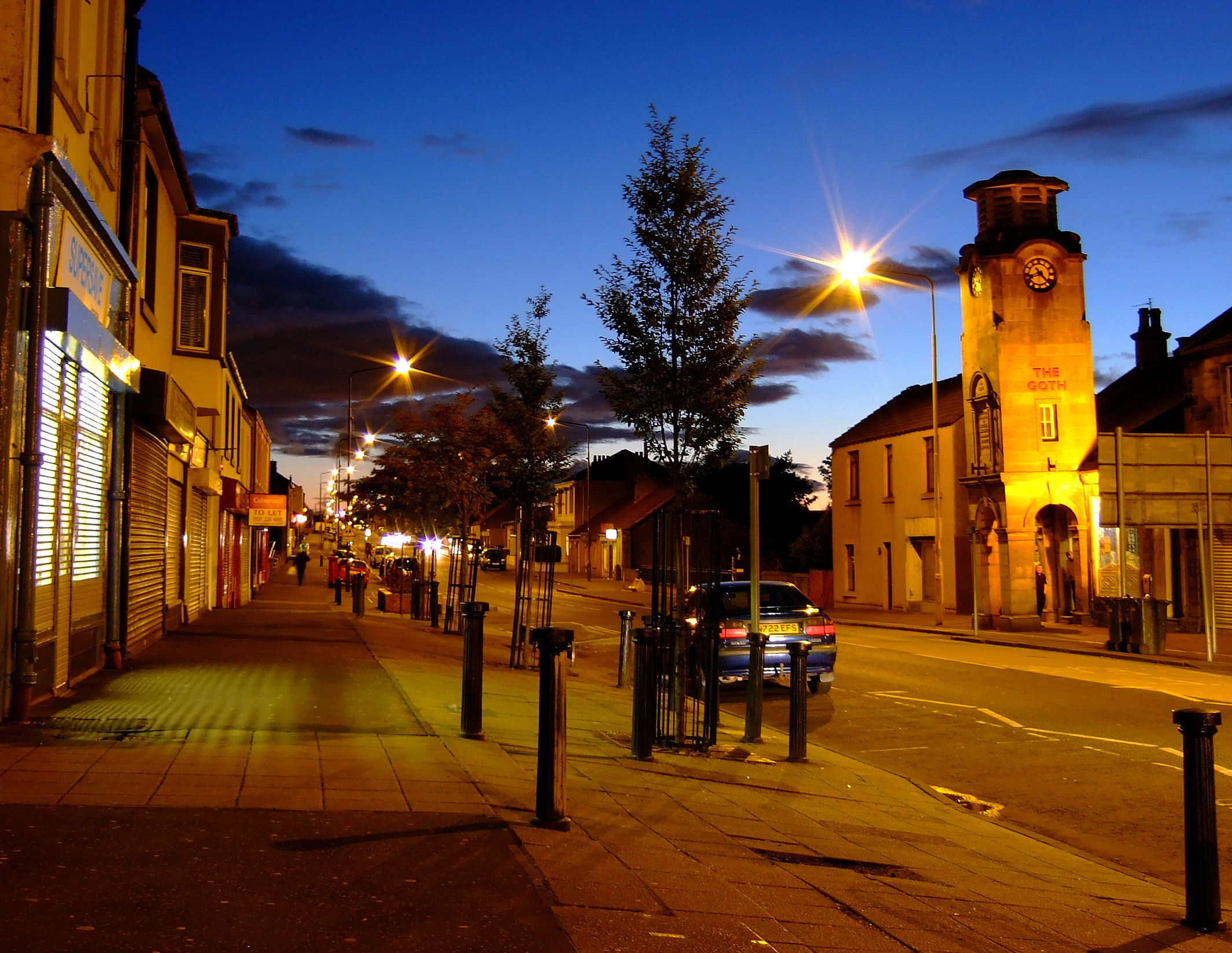
West Main Street, looking westwards

With the decline of local industry, most of Armadale is now residential, although some shops, including a new supermarket have been built. Other businesses include a local pub and a car showroom. The town has an industrial estate, as well as a local garden centre (the Mill) on the edge of town.

== Culture and community ==
Armadale has a public library located on North Street. The Armadale Partnership Centre is a large community centre in the town that includes council services, event spaces, meeting rooms, a cafe and sports facilities.

The town had a swimming pool, which was operated by Xcite, and was given the name Jim Sibbald Swimming Pool in honour of a former councillor who had served the community for 30 years has been closed since the end of August 2023. Pool facilities are now provided at the local high school, Armadale Academy.

Parks in Armadale include Watson Park (adjacent to the new war memorial), Nelson Park (once abandoned to flooding but renovated following the Queens Jubilee), and the Black Moss Nature Reserve (and Curling Pond). The Davie Kerr Heritage Walk is a round circular walk that encompasses the town and passes through historical sites and sites of natural interest within the town.

In May 2013, following the death of Trustee Rosie Wells, and her subsequent bequest, the Armadale registered Scottish Charity No SC043118 (The West Lothian Archaeological Trust) set up the Scottish National Aerial Photography Scheme for children and students. International recognition came in the same month, with the Trust being invited to become an Associated Partner of the ArchaeoLandscapes Europe Project, part of the European Union's Culture Programme.

In April 2026, the Grand Lodge Trustees of Scotland announced the purchase of a new headquarters in Armadale for the Grand Orange Lodge of Scotland. The organisation is a Protestant fraternal society associated with Ulster Scots identity and Orange Order history and tradition. Its activities include cultural events and Orange walks, the largest of which is "The Twelfth" held annually to mark the anniversary of William III's victory at the Battle of the Boyne. Critics have accused the Orange Order of sectarianism and anti-Catholic sentiment, whereas the organisation maintains that it is peaceful and dedicated to Protestant culture and heritage.

== Transport ==
The railway first reached Armadale in 1855, when the Bathgate to Monklands section of the Monkland Railways reached the village. In 1858 the first passenger railway station was built. Railway passenger services terminated in 1956. In 2011, rail services returned to Armadale with the opening of Armadale railway station constructed as part of the new Airdrie-Bathgate Rail Link. Located at the south end of Armadale it re-opened on 4 March 2011.

McGill's Scotland East and Lothian Country Buses also run bus services into the village linking Armadale with Blackridge, Whitburn, Bathgate, Livingston, Broxburn and Edinburgh.

A shared cycle and pedestrian path along the B8084 road was completed in 2021 following an investment of £1.2 million, providing an off-road cycle route and enabling pedestrian access to Whitburn.

== Education ==
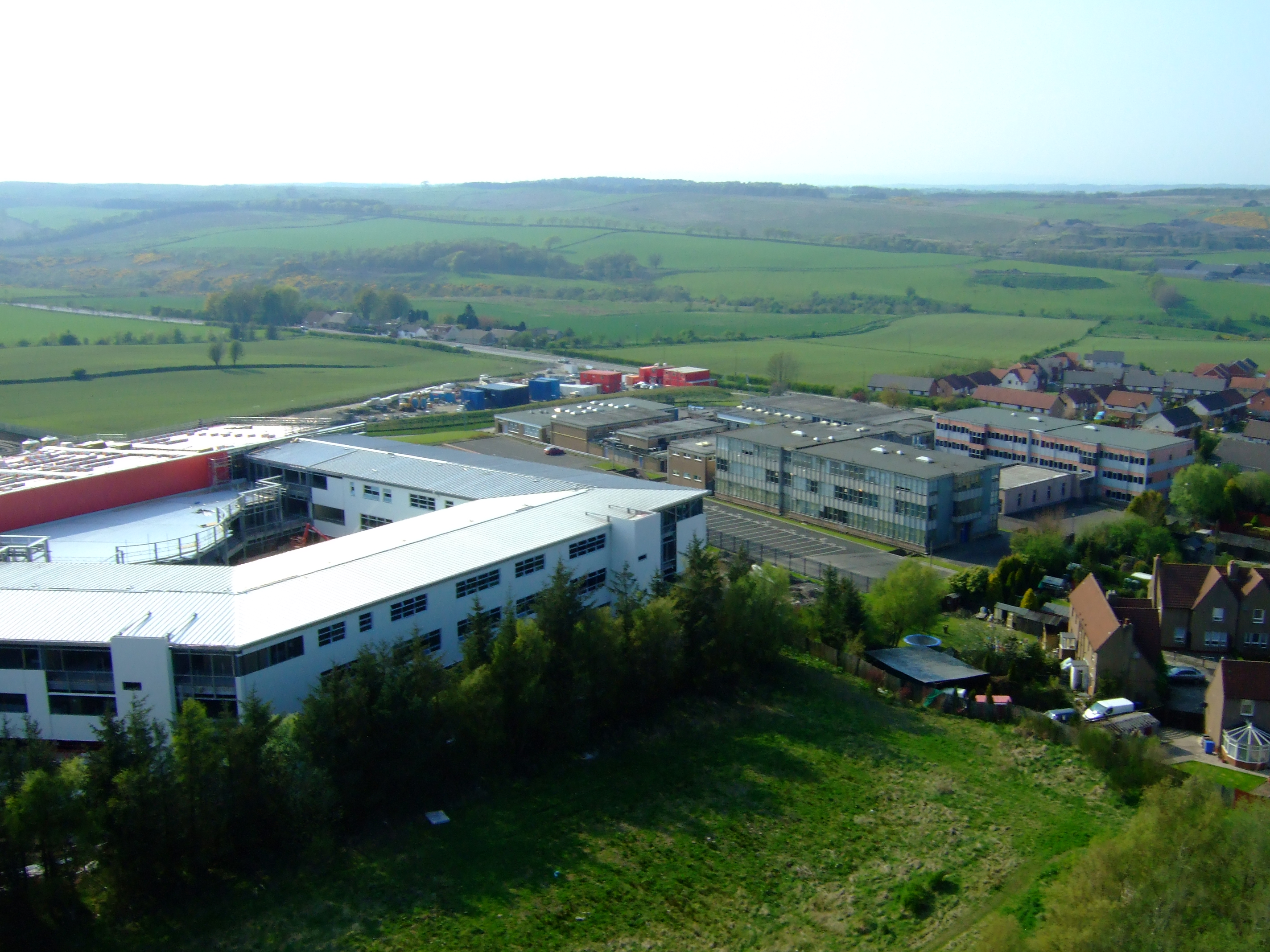
Kite aerial photo of the new Armadale Academy and the old one before demolition

The local high school Armadale Academy was originally built at the site that now plays host to Armadale Primary School. It was rebuilt and opened in 1967, at West Main Street, Armadale. It was again rebuilt and opened in August 2009, immediately behind the 1967 Academy building. The site of the old building now serves as car parking facilities, and new playing fields.

There are four primary schools in Armadale: Armadale primary school, St Anthony's RC primary school, Eastertoun primary school and the newer Southdale primary school. Armadale primary school occupies the former Academy building.

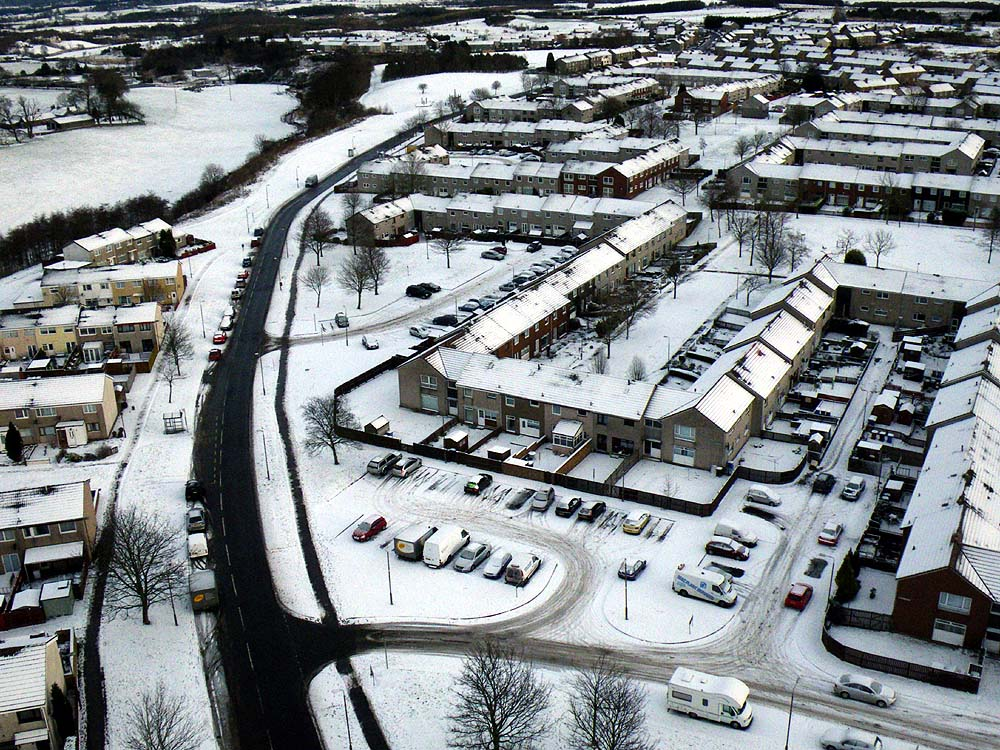
Kite aerial photo of the Drove Road, north Armadale

== Sport ==
Armadale Stadium features speedway. It was also used in the past for stock car racing and, until 2016, for greyhound racing. Speedway started in 1997 when the Edinburgh Monarchs team moved here competing in the Premier League, which it won 5 times, until the 2016 season. Reorganisation of the sport the following year saw the team enter the SGB Championship. The town also has a long-established football team, Armadale Thistle, whose home, Volunteer Park, is located on North Street. Armadale Bowling Club located in South Street was established in 1867 and celebrated its 150th anniversary in 2017.

The Armadale Flute Band, established in 1983, has won competitions all over Scotland.

== Notable people ==
See Category:People from Armadale, West Lothian

- William Angus, recipient of the Victoria Cross, was born in Armadale in 1888. There is a memorial stone to his birth at the railway station.
- Rev Dr Grant Barclay, Chaplain to the Queen
- Writer Tom Hanlin was born in Armadale in 1907.
- Ian Ellis, member of pioneering 60s/70s band Clouds, as well as many other famous bands of that era.
- John Walker, footballer, won Scottish League with Hearts, English League with Liverpool, five caps for Scotland
