= Hillend Loch =

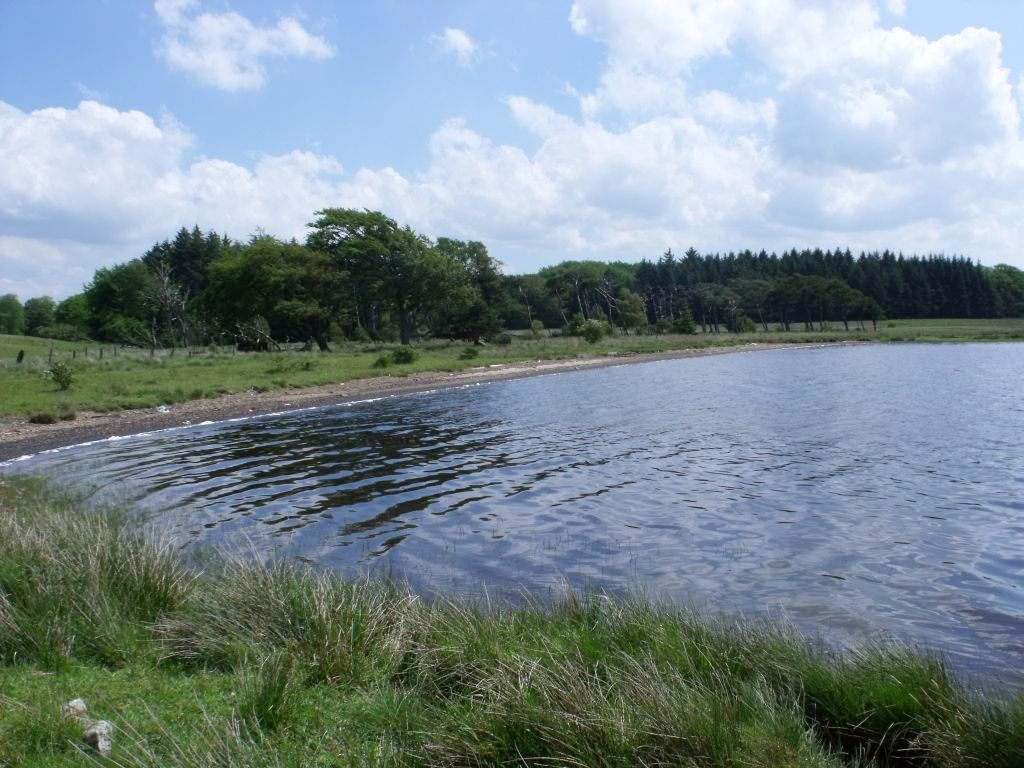

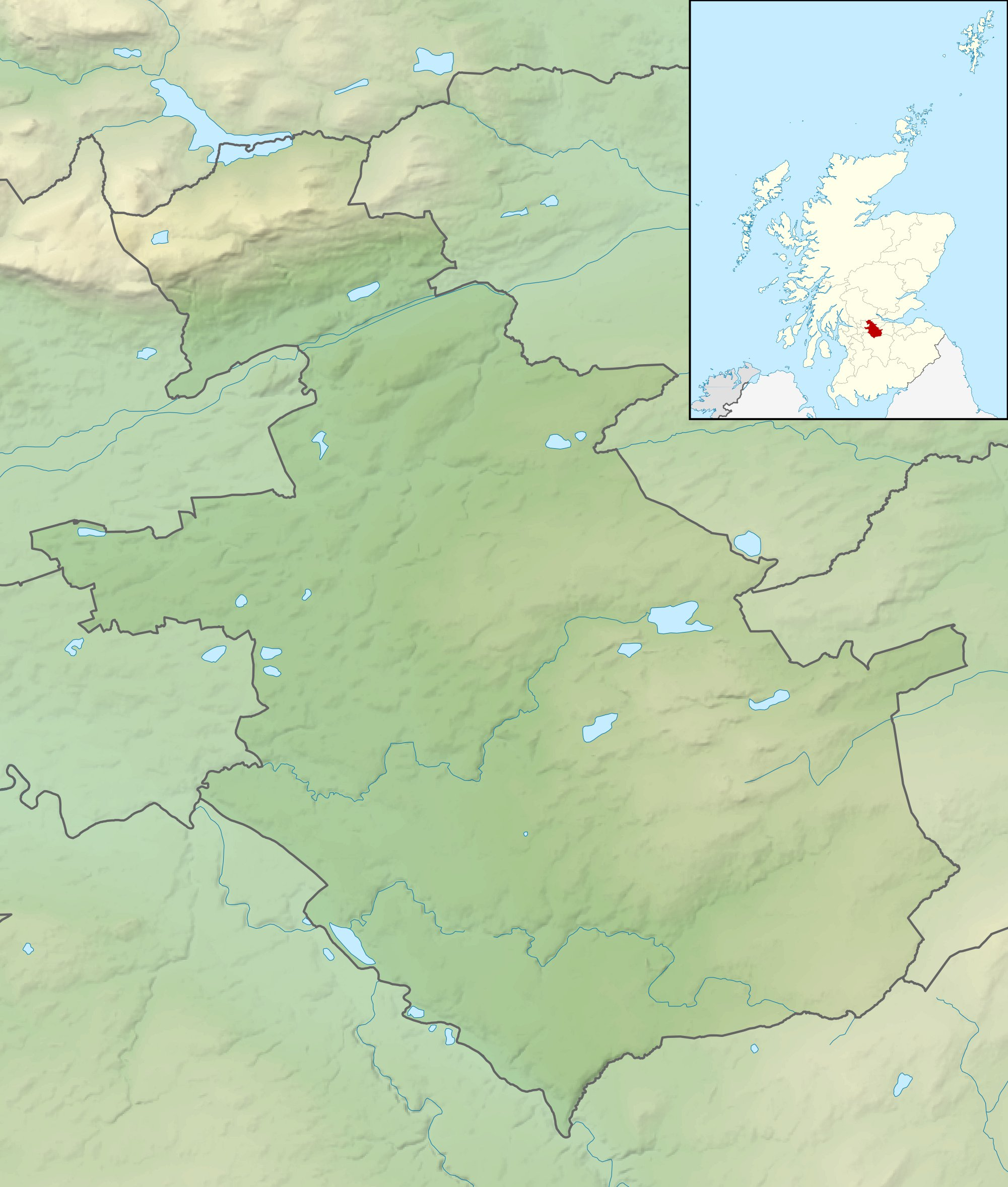
- Location within North Lanarkshire
- Location: Caldercruix, Scotland
- Coordinates: 55.887°N 3.863°W
- Type: reservoir
- Basin countries: United Kingdom
- Managing agency: Scottish Canals
- Surface area: 345 acres (140 ha)
- Surface elevation: 198 m (650 ft)
- Islands: Spiers Island

Hillend Loch or Hillend Reservoir is an artificial lake located to the east of Caldercruix in North Lanarkshire, Scotland owned by Scottish Canals. It is bordered on its south shore by the A89 road.

== Location ==
Hillend Loch sits immediately to the East of Caldercruix, near the town of Airdrie, in North Lanarkshire, Scotland. The loch has a large catchment area in the hills which surround it and six feeder stream drain these hills and their moorland. It has a surface area of 345 acres (140 ha) and its surface is 650 feet (200 m) above sea level. The railway line between Airdrie and Bathgate runs along the southern shore of Hillend Loch. National Cycle Route 75 runs alongside the railway on the southern shore, having been rebuilt as part of the re-opening of the Airdrie–Bathgate rail link.

== History ==
Hillend Loch is a naturalised reservoir established between 1797 and 1799 when the North Calder Water was dammed to supply water for the Monkland Canal, an enterprise which employed up to 1,500 people at one time. It was, at the time the dam was constructed, the largest man-made reservoir in the world. It still supplies water to the Forth & Clyde Canal and the remains of the Monkland Canal. As well as the storage of water for the canals, the loch was used to supply water to the steel and paper mills in the new industrial towns of Airdrie and Coatbridge.

In 1867 the reservoir passed into the ownership of the Caledonian Railway, and when the railways were nationalised in 1948 became publicly owned as part of British Waterways.

== Fishing ==
The fishing rights have been managed by Airdrie & District Angling Club since 1949 and they stock the loch during the angling season on a weekly basis. It has a naturally occurring stock of brown trout but these are supplemented by stocking with brown trout and the non-native rainbow trout. Fishing is by permit and fishing both from boats and from the shore is allowed.

== Wildlife ==
Hillend Loch has a variety of habitats around its shores, including mature mixed woodlands, meadows, peat bog, reed beds and heather moorland. A wide range of migratory ducks, geese and swans are attracted to the loch in winter while there are breeding populations of Eurasian coot, common moorhen and wildfowl. Among the more regularly recorded species are Canada goose, great crested grebe and osprey. Waders such as the Eurasian oystercatcher, northern lapwing and Eurasian curlew are commonly recorded, as too are grey heron, common kingfisher and white-throated dipper, especially in the streams that run into the loch. The shoreline vegetation and woods of Hillend Loch also provides shelter for the nests of the reed bunting and warblers, woodpeckers and owls. Mammals which are regularly recorded include the roe deer, Eurasian otter and the brown hare The diverse habitat around the loch provides homes for a wide variety of moths and butterflies, some of which are rather rare.

== See also ==
- List of places in Scotland
- List of reservoirs and dams in the United Kingdom
