= Garnqueen railway station =

Short-lived railway station in Garnqueen, North Lanarkshire

Coordinates: 55.89327°N 4.04840°W

Garnqueen

General information
- Location: Garnqueen, North Lanarkshire; Scotland

Other information
- Status: Disused

History
- Original company: Monkland Railways
- Pre-grouping: Monkland Railways

Key dates
- 10 December 1849: Opened
- 10 December 1851: Closed
Location

Garnqueen railway station served the suburb of Garnqueen, North Lanarkshire, Scotland, from 1849 to 1851 on the Monkland and Kirkintilloch Railway.

== History ==
The station was opened on 10 December 1849 by the Monkland Railways. It was a short-lived station, only being open for two years, closing on 10 December 1851.

Preceding station	Disused railways	Following station
Bedlay; Line and station closed	Monkland Railways; Monkland and Kirkintilloch Railway	Gartsherrie; Line and station closed
