= Bkr =

BKR may refer to:

- Baker, U.S. Navy rank
- Postal code for Birkirkara, Malta
- National Rail station code for Blackridge railway station, West Lothian, Scotland
- Brad Keselowski Racing, a former stock car team
- Bas Koeten Racing, a Dutch auto racing team
