= Plains railway station =

Disused railway station in Plains, North Lanarkshire

Plains

General information
- Location: Plains, North Lanarkshire; Scotland
- Coordinates: 55.8789°N 3.9241°W
- Grid reference: NS797667
- Platforms: 2

Other information
- Status: Disused

History
- Original company: North British Railway
- Pre-grouping: North British Railway
- Post-grouping: LNER; British Railways (Scottish Region)

Key dates
- May 1882: Opened
- 18 June 1951: Closed
Location

Plains railway station served the village of Plains, North Lanarkshire, Scotland from 1882 to 1951 on the Bathgate and Coatbridge Railway.

== History ==
The station opened in May 1882 by the North British Railway. To the west was Brownieside Colliery and to the east of the level crossing was the signal box. The station closed on 18 June 1951.

Preceding station	Historical railways	Following station
Clarkston; Line and station open	North British Railway; Bathgate and Coatbridge Railway	Caldercruix; Line and station open
