= Edward Blades =

Scottish mathematician (1875–1953)

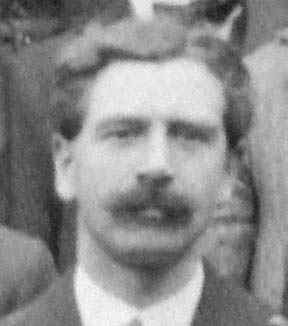
- Edward Blades
- Born: 6 March 1875; Armadale, West Lothian, Scotland
- Died: 21 November 1953 (aged 78); Edinburgh, Scotland
- Education: University of Edinburgh, M.A. 1900, B.S.c (Pure) 1902 The Training College and received a Diploma of Education at Higher Grade
- Occupation: Lecturer Executive Officer to West Lothian Education Authority (1919-1930) Director of Education West Lothian (1930-1939)

Edward Blades was a Scottish mathematician and teacher. He later became the West Lothian Director of Education and was awarded an OBE for army education services during the Second World War.

== Early life and education ==
Edward Blades was the youngest child of Daniel and Janet Blades on 6 March 1875 in Armadale Scotland. His father was a blacksmith. He attended Armadale Public School, where he later taught as a pupil teacher.

He attended the University of Edinburgh from 1894 to 1900, graduating with a MA in Mathematics and Natural Philosophy. He was later awarded a B.S.c (Pure) in 1902.

After university, Blades attended the Training College and received a Diploma of Education at the Higher Grade as well as the Kelland memorial prize, the Ramsay memorial prize, and six additional medals.

== Career ==
Blades was the junior lecturer in Mathematics and Science and Geography assistant at Moray House Training College. He also lectured honours Geology at Heriot-Watt College. He then became the head of George Watson's Ladies' College mathematics department. In 1905 he joined the Edinburgh Mathematical Society. From 1919, he was the Executive Officer to West Lothian Education Authority until 1930 when he became the Director of Education for the West Lothian Education Committee (precursors to the current West Lothian Council.) He retired from this post in 1939. He was then appointed the secretary of the Edinburgh University extra Mural Committee.

During World War 2, although retired, Blades championed the University Extra-Mural Committee for civilian adult education. For his service he was awarded an honorary Bachelors of Law from the University of Edinburgh as well as an O.B.E. (Civil Division) for Army Education services in 1948.

Blades died in an Edinburgh nursing home on 21 November 1953.
