= Bathgate Lower railway station =

Railway station in West Lothian, Scotland

Bathgate Lower
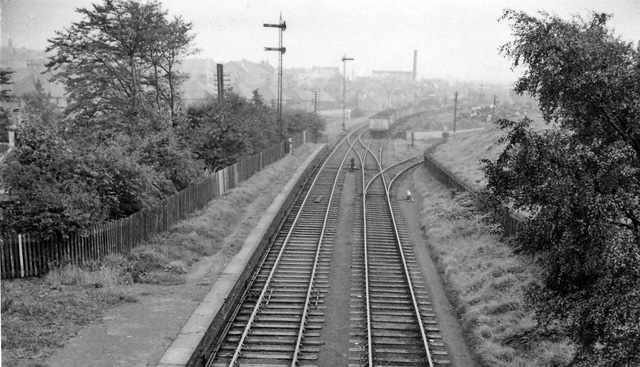
- The Site Bathgate Lower railway station in 1962

General information
- Location: Bathgate, West Lothian; Scotland
- Coordinates: 55.904333°N 3.649714°W
- Grid reference: NS969691
- Platforms: 2

Other information
- Status: Disused

History
- Original company: Monkland Railways
- Pre-grouping: North British Railway
- Post-grouping: LNER

Key dates
- 1856: Opened as Bathgate
- 1 August 1865: Renamed as Bathgate Lower
- 1 May 1930: Closed
Location

Bathgate Lower railway station was a railway station serving the town of Bathgate in West Lothian, Scotland. It was located on the Bathgate Branch of the Monkland Railways.

== History ==
Bathgate was opened by the Monkland Railways in 1856, and renamed Bathgate Lower on 1 August 1865 by the North British Railway at the same time as the Edinburgh and Bathgate Railway station of the same name was renamed Bathgate Upper. It originally had no connection to Bathgate Upper.

It was built as a 2 platform station with a level crossing at the bottom of the station site although in 1904 the northbound platform was removed to provide access to the West Lothian Steel Rolling Mill and shovel works.

The station was closed, along with the other station on the branch - Westfield (NBR) - by the LNER on 1 May 1930.

Bathgate Lower was situated between Easton Road and Cochrane Street in Bathgate. From the station, a branch continued to Balbardie Colliery to the north east of the station, and a further branch to Easton Colliery to the south west of the station. The main branch continued 4 miles and 6 chains west from Bathgate Lower to Blackston Jct, where it joined the Slamannan Railway. The line which run through the station was closed in 1973.

Today nothing remains of the station.

== Services ==
Preceding station	Disused railways	Following station
Westfield (NBR); Line and station closed	North British Railway; Bathgate Branch of Monkland Railways	Bathgate Upper; Line and station closed
