= Bedlay railway station =

Short-lived railway station in Chryston, North Lanarkshire

Bedlay

General information
- Location: Chryston, North Lanarkshire; Scotland
- Coordinates: 55.90384°N 4.07867°W

Other information
- Status: Disused

History
- Original company: Monkland Railways
- Pre-grouping: Monkland Railways

Key dates
- 10 December 1849: Opened
- 31 December 1849: Closed
Location

Bedlay railway station served the village of Chryston, North Lanarkshire, Scotland, in 1849 on the Monkland and Kirkintilloch Railway.

== History ==
The station was opened on 10 December 1849 by the Monkland Railways. It was known as Belday in the Glasgow Herald. Services only stopped here on Wednesdays and Saturdays. It was a very short-lived station, only being open for 3 weeks before closing on 31 December 1849.

Preceding station	Disused railways	Following station
Bridgend; Line and station closed	Monkland Railways; Monkland and Kirkintilloch Railway	Garnqueen; Line and station closed
