= Caldercruix railway station =

Railway station in North Lanarkshire, Scotland

Caldercruix
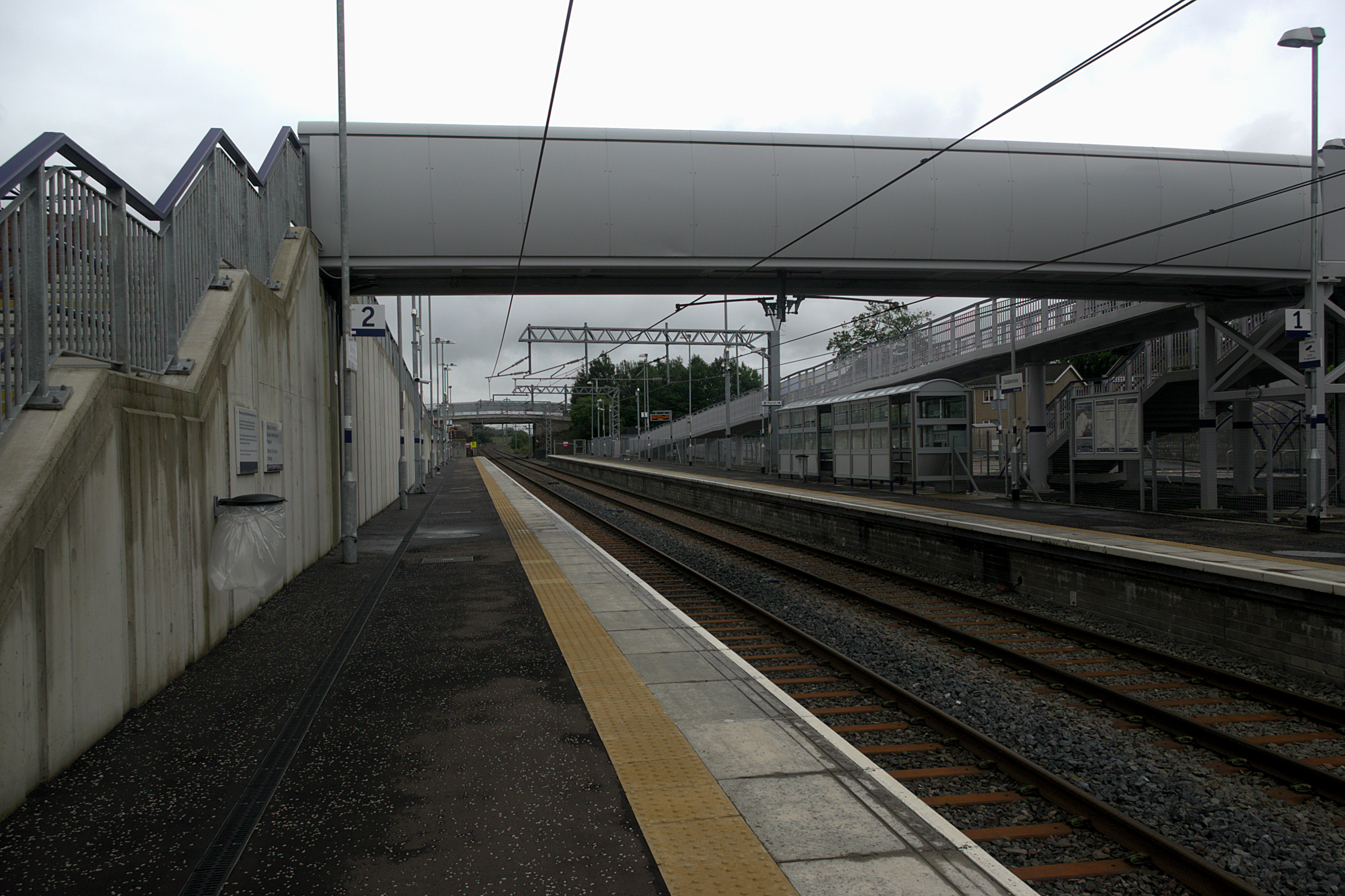
- Caldercruix railway station facing East towards Blackridge

General information
- Location: Caldercruix, North Lanarkshire; Scotland
- Coordinates: 55.88798°N 3.88781°W
- Grid reference: NS819677
- Managed by: ScotRail
- Transit authority: SPT
- Platforms: 2

Other information
- Station code: CAC
- Fare zone: 3
- Classification: DfT category F2

History
- Original company: Bathgate and Coatbridge Railway
- Pre-grouping: North British Railway
- Post-grouping: LNER

Key dates
- 11 August 1862: Opened
- 9 January 1956: Closed
- 13 February 2011: Reopened

Passengers
- 2020/21: ▼9,628
- 2021/22: ▲51,724
- 2022/23: ▲67,194
- 2023/24: ▲70,158
- 2024/25: ▲73,754
Location
Notes
- Passenger statistics from the Office of Rail and Road

Caldercruix railway station serves the village of Caldercruix in North Lanarkshire, Scotland. It is managed by ScotRail and is on the North Clyde Line. Originally opened by the Bathgate and Coatbridge Railway in 1862, it was closed in 1956 then reopened in 2011 as part of the reopening of the Airdrie–Bathgate rail link.

== History ==
The station was originally opened as part of the Bathgate and Coatbridge Railway on 11 August 1862 and closed on 9 January 1956.

== Reopening ==
The station was due to be reopened as part of the Airdrie-Bathgate Rail Link on 12 December 2010. However, building work was held up by bad weather, and a bus service ferried passengers until the station was able to open. The reopening eventually took place on 13 February 2011.

The Airdrie-Bathgate Rail Link is a project created to enable Glasgow and Edinburgh to be linked via a fourth route by reopening the railway between the towns of Airdrie and Bathgate.

== Services ==
The station has a basic half-hourly off-peak service Mondays to Sundays, westbound to Airdrie, Queen St Low Level and Milngavie and eastbound to Bathgate and Edinburgh Waverley. In the evenings and on Sundays the westbound terminus is Helensburgh Central rather than Milngavie.

Preceding station	National Rail	Following station
Blackridge	ScotRail; North Clyde Line	Drumgelloch
	Historical railways	
Forrestfield; Line open; Station closed	Bathgate and Coatbridge Railway; North British Railway	Plains; Line open; Station closed
