= Armadale railway station (Scotland) =

Railway station in West Lothian, Scotland

Armadale Scottish Gaelic: Armadal
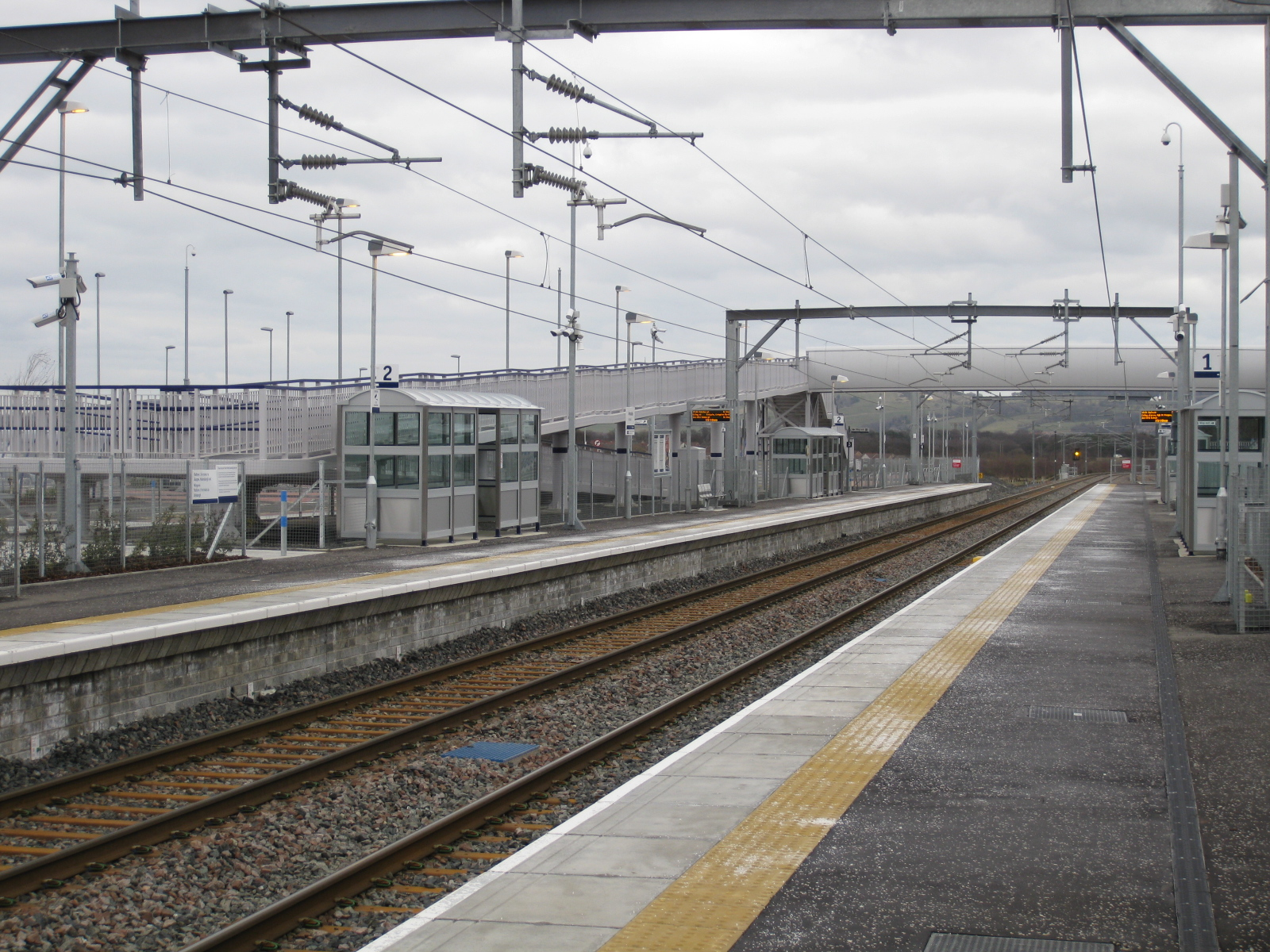
- Armadale station, looking east towards Bathgate

General information
- Location: Armadale, West Lothian; Scotland
- Coordinates: 55.8864°N 3.6931°W
- Grid reference: NS938670
- Platforms: 2

Other information
- Station code: ARM
- Classification: DfT category F2

History
- Original company: Bathgate and Coatbridge Railway
- Pre-grouping: North British Railway
- Post-grouping: LNER

Key dates
- 11 August 1862: Opened
- 9 January 1956: Closed
- 4 March 2011: Reopened and resited

Passengers
- 2020/21: ▼35,928
- 2021/22: ▲0.134 million
- 2022/23: ▲0.173 million
- 2023/24: ▲0.213 million
- 2024/25: ▲0.232 million
Location
Notes
- Passenger statistics from the Office of Rail and Road

Armadale railway station is a railway station serving the town of Armadale, West Lothian, Scotland. It is served by trains on the North Clyde Line.

== History ==
The first station opened with the line on 11 August 1862. It was opened by the Bathgate and Coatbridge Railway which was then absorbed by the North British Railway. Becoming part of the London and North Eastern Railway during the Grouping of 1923, it passed on to the Scottish Region of British Railways on nationalisation in 1948, and was then closed by the British Transport Commission with the withdrawal of passenger services on 9 January 1956.

== Reopening ==
The station was reopened as part of the Airdrie–Bathgate rail link, a project created to enable Glasgow and Edinburgh to be linked via a fourth route by reopening the railway between Airdrie and Bathgate. The very severe winter weather of November and December 2010 delayed completion of construction work, and the station was initially served by a replacement bus service. The station was reopened on 4 March 2011.

The new station is sited on the northeast side of the road bridge on the B8084 (Station Road), whereas the original station was situated just to the southwest of the bridge - the new location being to allow for car park construction and to comply with station curvature requirements (the original station was on a curve).

== Services ==
The station has a half-hourly off-peak service Mondays to Sundays, westbound to Airdrie, Queen St Low Level and Milngavie and eastbound to Bathgate and Edinburgh Waverley. In the evenings and on Sundays the westbound terminus is Helensburgh Central rather than Milngavie.

Preceding station	National Rail	Following station
Bathgate	ScotRail; North Clyde Line	Blackridge
	Historical railways	
Bathgate (Upper); Line open; station closed	Bathgate and Coatbridge Railway; North British Railway	Westcraigs; Line open; station closed
