= Blackridge railway station =

Railway station in West Lothian, Scotland

Blackridge Scottish Gaelic: An Druim Dubh
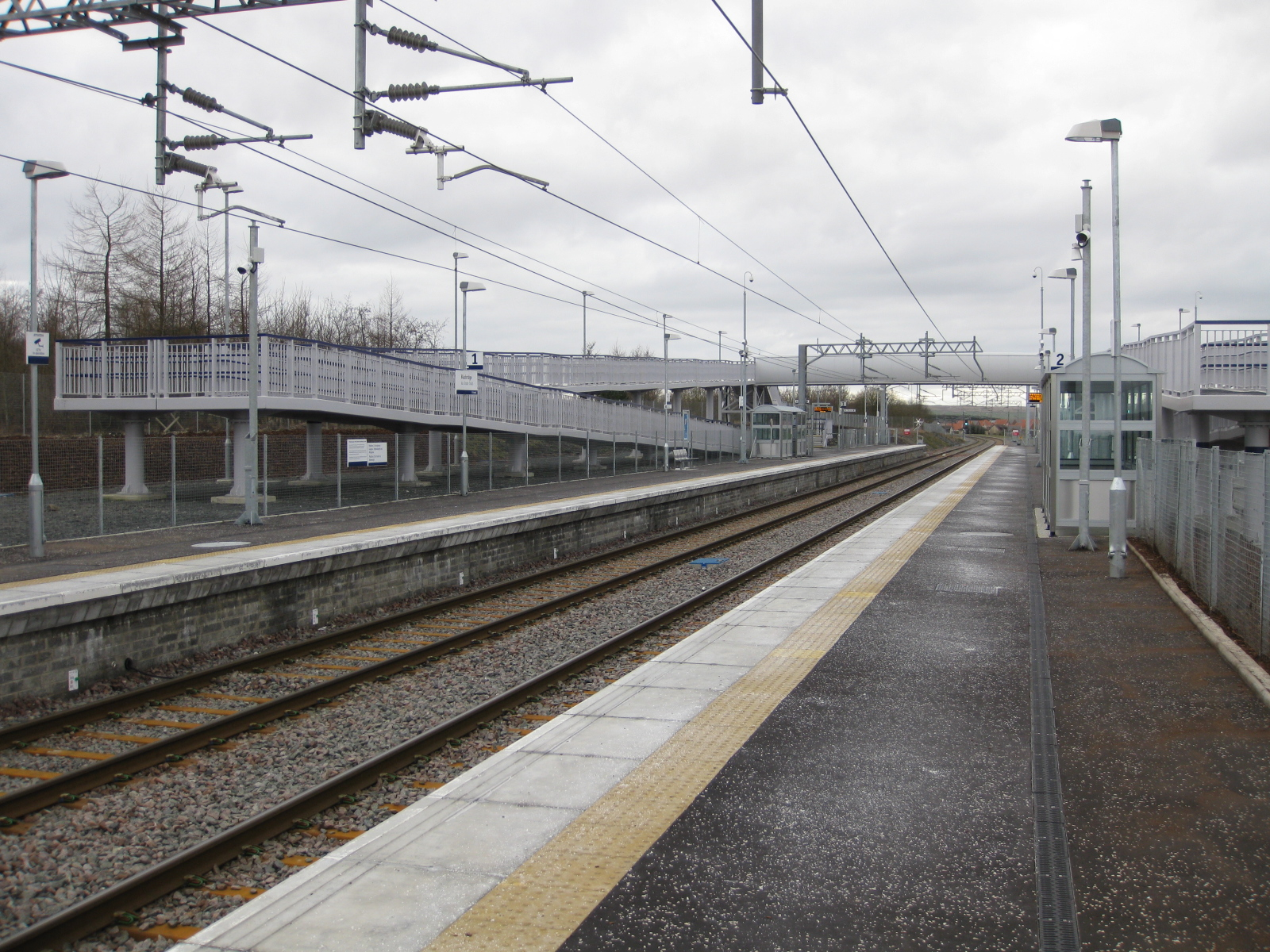
- Blackridge station, looking west towards Caldercruix

General information
- Location: Blackridge, West Lothian; Scotland
- Coordinates: 55.8844°N 3.7502°W
- Grid reference: NS895667
- Manager: ScotRail
- Platforms: 2

Other information
- Station code: BKR
- Classification: DfT category F2

Key dates
- 12 December 2010: Opened

Passengers
- 2021/22: ▲27,086
- 2022/23: ▲37,282
- 2023/24: ▲48,902
- 2024/25: ▲51,822
- 2025/26: ▲57,244
Location
Notes
- Passenger statistics from the Office of Rail and Road

Blackridge railway station is a railway station on the North Clyde Line. It serves the town of Blackridge in West Lothian, Scotland.

== History ==
The original station in this locale was called Westcraigs, built by the Bathgate and Coatbridge Railway. It was also the site of a junction with the Wilsontown, Morningside and Coltness Railway. Opened on 11 August 1862, in some timetables the station was called Westcraigs for Harthill. The station closed on 9 January 1956.

== Opening ==
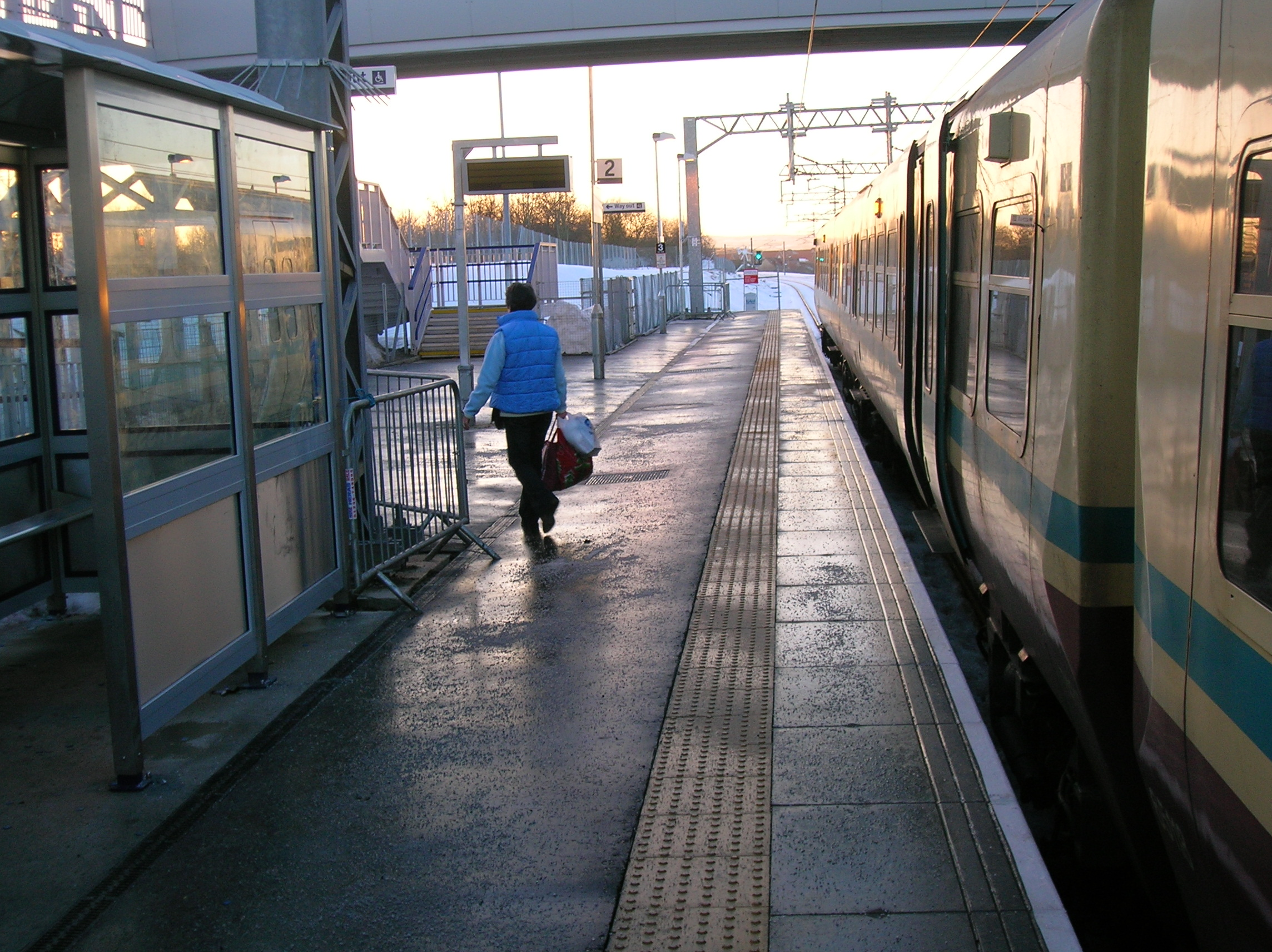
Platform 2 on the day of opening

Blackridge was originally excluded from the Airdrie–Bathgate rail link project, but after a three-year campaign by the local community, funding was approved by the Scottish Government at a cost of £5 million. Private housing developer Manorlane agreed to fund 40% of the costs. However, it closed and the funding promise expired. West Lothian Council agreed to take on the burden and expects to recoup the cost from additional expansion in the area. The station opened on 12 December 2010 on a new site, some 600 metres (660 yd) closer to Edinburgh than the previous Westcraigs station.

== Services ==
The station has a basic half-hourly off-peak service Mondays to Sundays, westbound to Airdrie, Queen St Low Level and Milngavie and eastbound to Bathgate and Edinburgh Waverley. In the evenings and on Sundays the westbound terminus is Helensburgh Central rather than Milngavie.

Preceding station	National Rail	Following station
Armadale	ScotRail; North Clyde Line	Caldercruix
