= Armadale Academy =

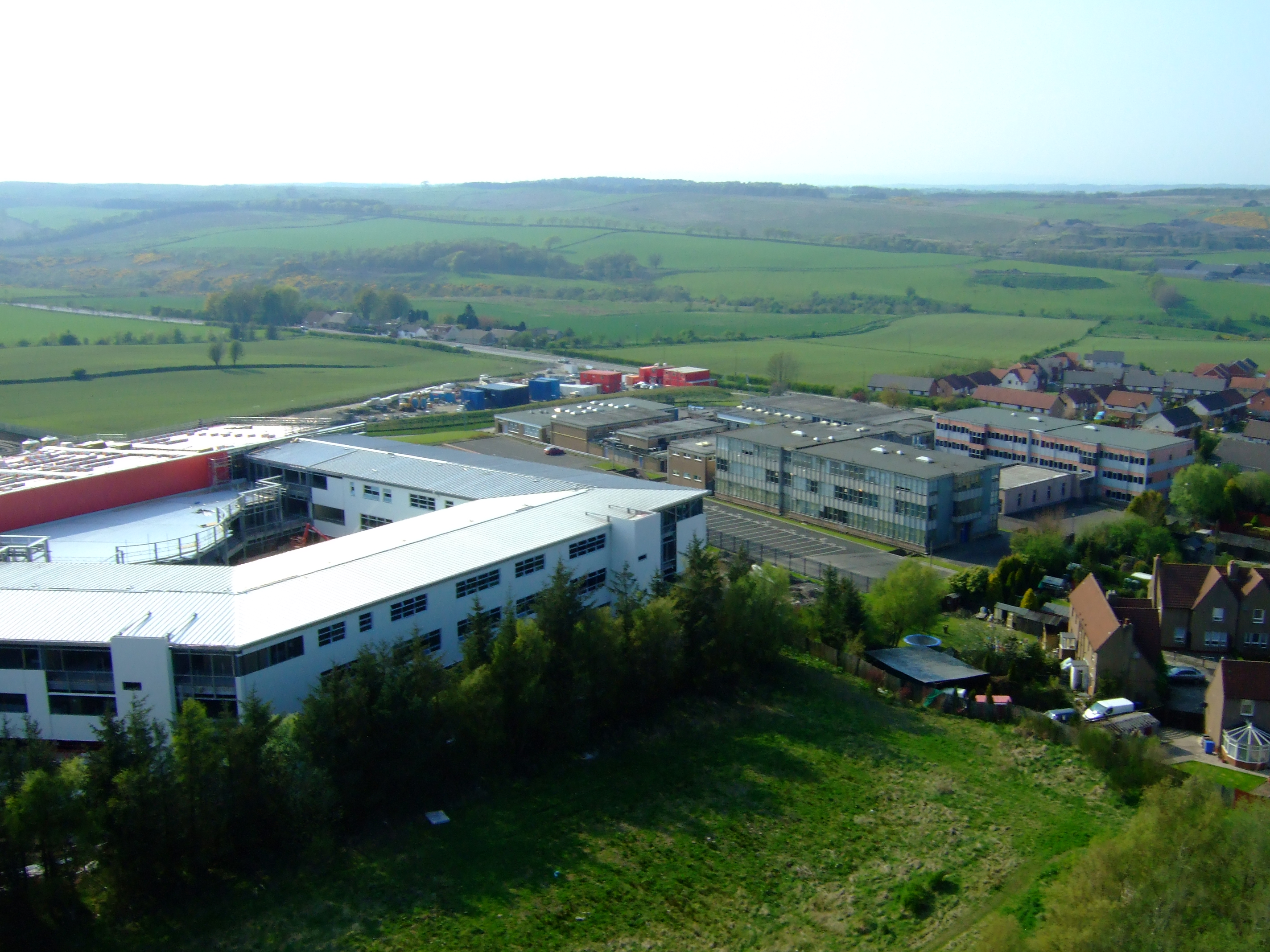
- Aerial view of the new (under construction) and old school buildings in 2008. The old school has since been demolished.

Location
- West Main Street; Armadale, West Lothian, EH48 3LY; Scotland; 55.8949°N 3.7145°W

Information
- Type: Secondary school
- Motto: Nihil Nisi Industria (Nothing Without Diligence)
- Established: 1969
- Headteacher: Nicola Barker-Harrison
- Houses: Honeyman, Cochran, Wood
- Colours: Yellow, Blue, Red
- Website: http://armadaleacademy.co.uk/

Armadale Academy is a secondary school in Armadale, West Lothian. Opened in 1969, the academy moved to its current location in 2009. It is split into three houses: Cochran, Honeyman, and Wood. Armadale Academy's mission statement is “Learning Together, Achieving Together.” The school's staff and students are encouraged to focus on community building, and celebration of success.

== History ==
The first school in Armadale was opened in 1819, paid for mainly from the bequest of John Newland (the bulk of which paid for Bathgate Academy).

Several other private schools were opened in the 19th century, many financed by mining companies.

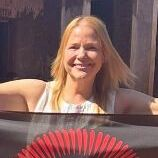
Nicola Barker-Harrison, headteacher in 2025

Following the introduction of compulsory education in 1877, the North School was built on Bullion Brae (now Academy Road). This became the primary school. In the 1960s, the county council decided a new school and purchased land formerly occupied by a coal mine's pithead buildings. The shaft was filled in, and the colliery and land were reclaimed to form playing fields. The school building, designed to accommodate 700 students, was opened on 29 March 1968 by Margaret Herbison MP, at a cost of over £500,000.

The council agreed to finance a new building, to be built on the same site and opened for the 2009/2010 session. This new school was officially opened on 28 September 2009 by Fiona Hyslop MSP.
