= Ogilface Castle =

Coordinates: 55°54′08″N 3°43′04″W

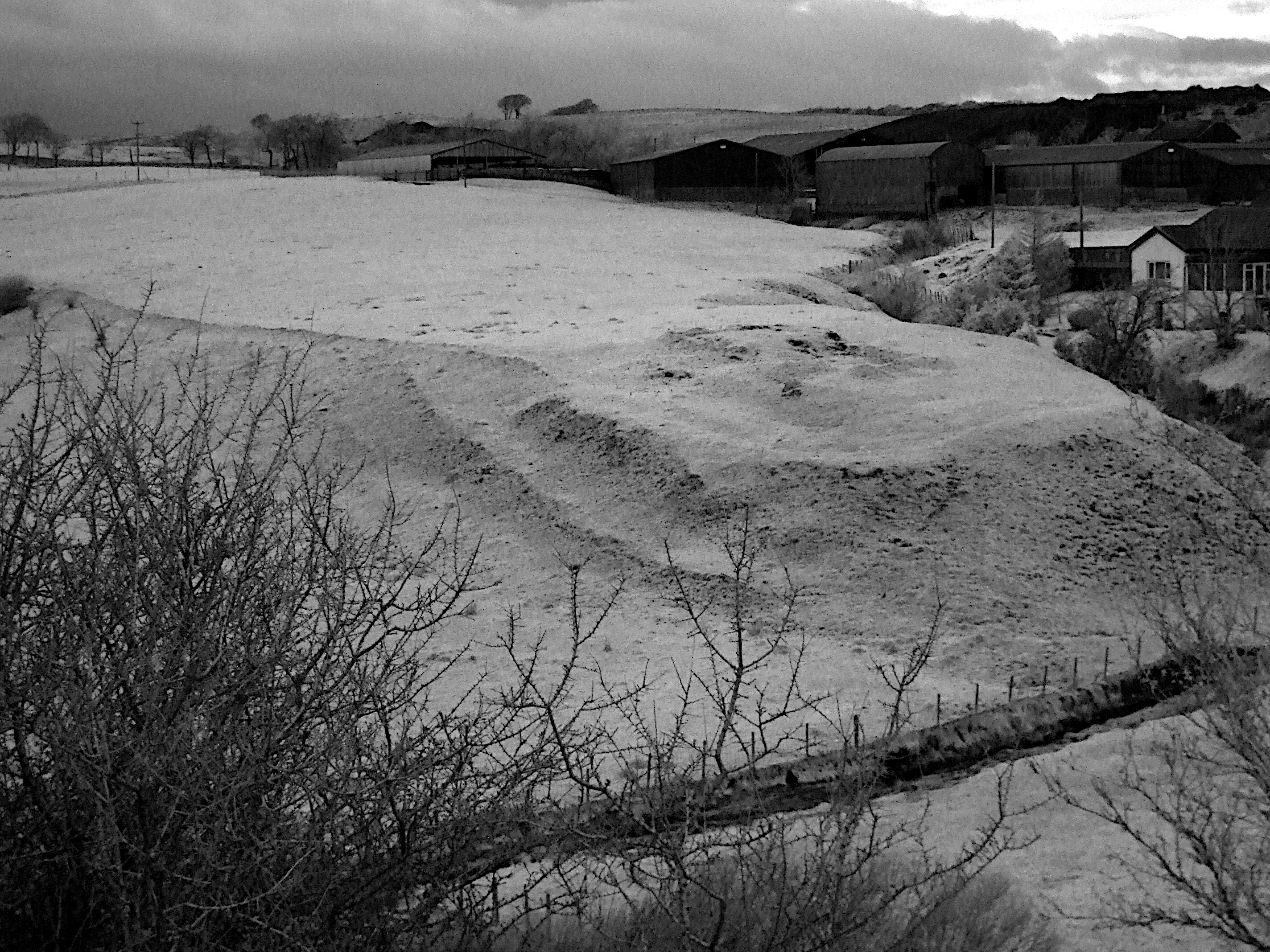
The site of the castle near Armadale

Ogilface Castle was a medieval castle in Armadale, West Lothian, Scotland.

The castle was established in the mid 12th century when it was granted to Holyrood Abbey by William de Veteri Ponte.

Ogilface was the seat of the Barons of Ogilface before it passed to the Earl of Linlithgow, then fell out of use.

The ruins were said to have been used by Covenanters a place of refuge.

Today, only mounds remain in extant. A geophysical survey of the Ogilface castle remains was carried out in 2008. The West Lothian Archaeological Trust, working with the Edinburgh Archaeological Field Society has also investigate the castle. Infrared kite surveys have revealed features of the castle not visible at ground level.
