= Westcraigs (1st station) railway station =

Disused railway station in West Craigs, South Lanarkshire

Westcraigs
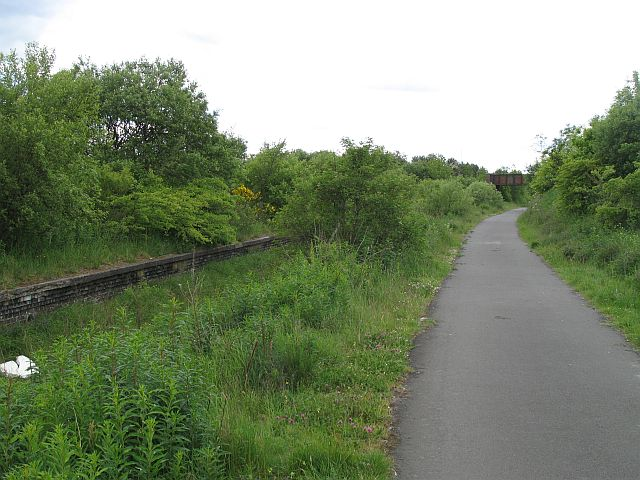
- The site of the old station in 2008

General information
- Location: West Craigs, West Lothian; Scotland
- Coordinates: 55.8812°N 3.7629°W
- Grid reference: NS939670
- Platforms: 2

Other information
- Status: Disused

History
- Original company: Monkland Railways
- Pre-grouping: North British Railway
- Post-grouping: London and North Eastern Railway; British Railways (Scottish Region)

Key dates
- 11 August 1862: Opened
- 9 January 1956: Closed
Location

Westcraigs railway station served the area of West Craigs (Blackridge) in West Lothian, Scotland, from 1862 to 1956 on the Bathgate and Coatbridge Railway.

== History ==
The station opened on 11 August 1862 by the Monkland Railways. To the south was the goods yard. The station building was on the westbound platform, which also had a waiting room, and a wooden waiting room was on the eastbound platform. A junction of the same name connecting to mines at Benhar (and eventually to the Shotts Iron Works) was located immediately to the west of the station; the Westrigg colliery was a short distance to the east, with the Woodend colliery further on to the north-east.

The station closed on 9 January 1956. The eastbound platform was demolished in 1988 when the site was converted to a footpath.

The line through the station was reopened in 2010 but the station was not reopened (see Blackridge railway station opened nearby on the site of Westrigg Colliery).

Preceding station	Historical railways	Following station
Forrestfield; Line open, station closed	Bathgate and Coatbridge Railway	Armadale; Line open, station closed
