= Blackridge, West Lothian =

Town in West Lothian, Scotland

Coordinates: 55.884°N 3.767°W

Blackridge: Scottish Gaelic: An Druim Dubh; Scots: Blackrig
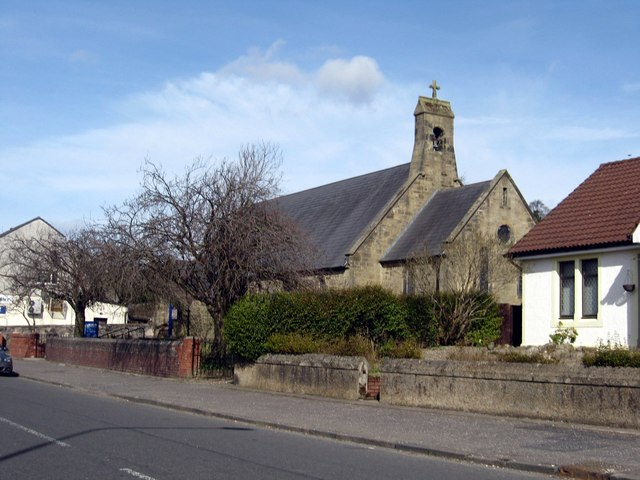
- Blackridge Parish Church

- Location within West Lothian
- Population: 2,070 (2020)
- OS grid reference: NS894670
- Council area: West Lothian
- Lieutenancy area: West Lothian
- Country: Scotland
- Sovereign state: United Kingdom
- Post town: BATHGATE
- Postcode district: EH48
- Dialling code: 01501
- Police: Scotland
- Fire: Scottish
- Ambulance: Scottish
- UK Parliament: Bathgate and Linlithgow
- Scottish Parliament: Linlithgow

Blackridge (Scots: Blackrig, Scottish Gaelic: An Druim Dubh) is a small town in the western part of West Lothian, Scotland.

The village name dates to 1581, first recorded as Blakrig. Later, Blackrig and then Blackrigg became the standard spelling until Blackridge became the norm in official documents after about 1840. Blackrig remains the local pronunciation.

The population, as of the mid-2013 estimate, of Blackridge was 1,926 including Westrigg. The modern village dates from the building of the new Edinburgh-Glasgow road in 1796 and the building of a coaching inn midway between the cities, officially Westcraigs Inn but known locally as the Craig Inn. The inn now serves as housing, a community centre and library.

== Industry ==
After the arrival of the railway line linking Airdrie and Bathgate in 1862, the exploitation of local coal reserves became more practicable although it was not until the late 1880s that the first local colliery was sunk at Westrigg. The village grew from a population of under 200 to over 2,000 by World War I with coal mining and whinstone quarrying the main employments – the area was served by Westcraigs railway station.

The last colliery and the railway station closed in the late 1950s and Blackridge became a dormitory for nearby towns with, for much of the 1960s and 1970s, the British Leyland truck and tractor assembly plant at Bathgate the principal employer.

In 2010, a new Blackridge railway station was opened on the site of Westrigg colliery, offering a rail link to both Glasgow and Edinburgh.

== Housing ==
The building of council housing from the late 1920s until the late 1960s established the modern village with 85% of residents renting from the local authority. Small scale private house building in the 1980s gave way to more substantial developments in the 1990s and early the 21st century and the current local plan visualises a doubling of the number of dwellings to around 1,500 by the early 2010s.

== Religion and culture ==
There is one church remaining in the village (Church of Scotland) The present stone building was built by public subscription and donations and is situated on the Main street in the middle of the village and celebrated its centenary in 2001.

== People ==
Blackridge was the birthplace of the late Sir Peter Matthews, who retired as Chief Constable of Surrey Police, born on 25 December 1917.
