= Airdrie–Bathgate rail link =

Scottish railway project

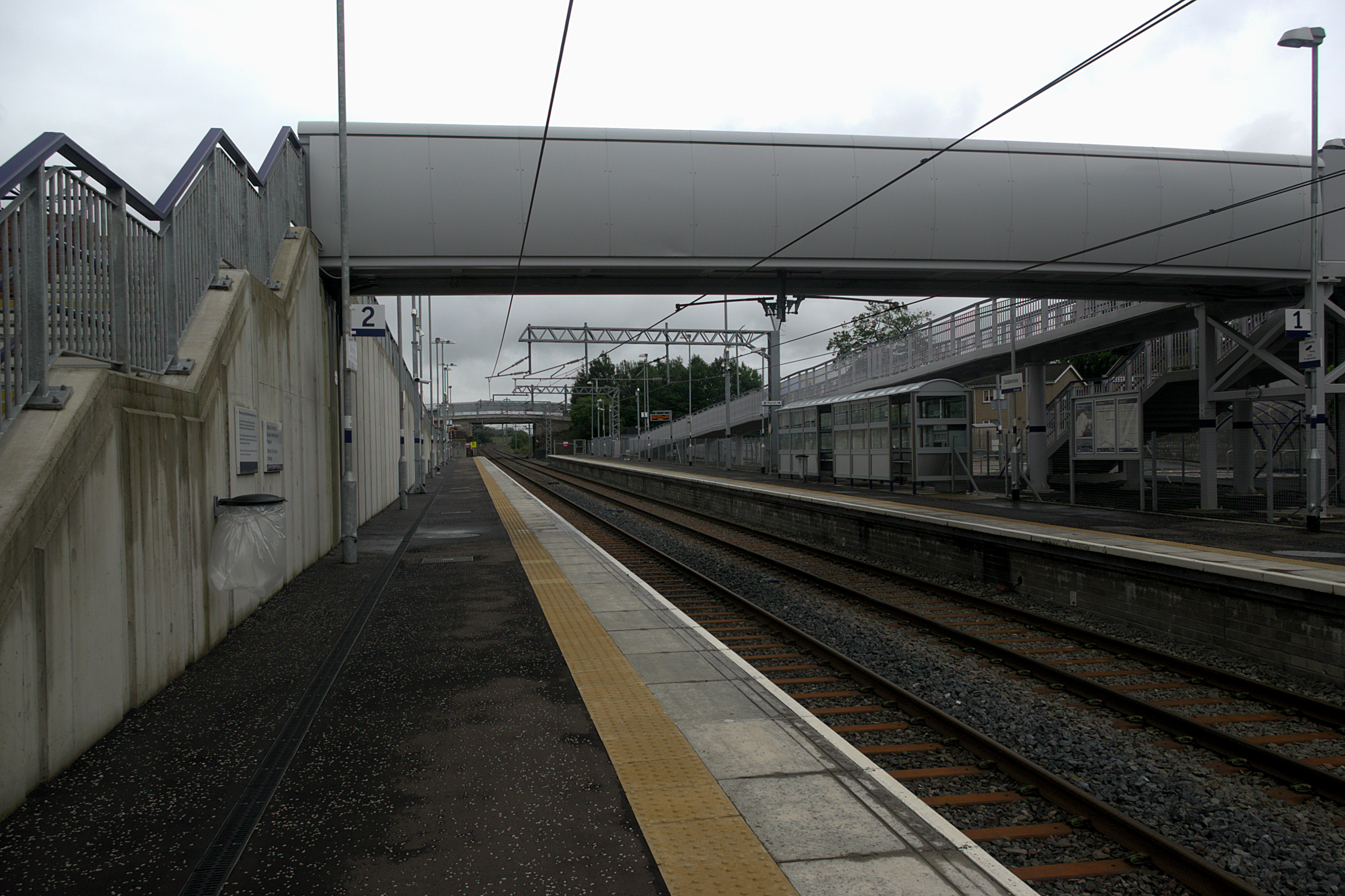
- Reopened Caldercruix Railway Station

Overview
- Status: Operational
- Owner: Network Rail
- Locale: Central Scotland
- Termini: Edinburgh; Glasgow

Service
- Type: Heavy rail
- System: National Rail
- Operator(s): ScotRail
- Rolling stock: Class 334

History
- Opened: December 2010

Technical
- Number of tracks: Double
- Track gauge: 4 ft 8 1/2 in (1,435 mm) standard gauge
- Electrification: 25 kV 50 Hz AC OHLE
- Operating speed: 90 mph (140 km/h) max

The Airdrie–Bathgate rail link is a railway project in central Scotland.

Airdrie-Bathgate Railway and Linked Improvements Act 2007
- Act of the Scottish Parliament
- Scottish Parliament
- Long title: An Act of the Scottish Parliament to authorise the construction of new railways between Drumgelloch and Bathgate, including new stations at Caldercruix and Armadale; to authorise the use of land for relocated stations at Drumgelloch and Bathgate; to authorise related improvements to the existing railways between Airdrie and Drumgelloch and Bathgate and Edinburgh; to regularise the operation of certain enactments relating to the existing railway affected by the works so authorised; and for connected purposes.
- Citation: 2007 asp 19

Dates
- Royal assent: 8 May 2007

Status: Amended

Text of statute as originally enacted

Text of the Airdrie-Bathgate Railway and Linked Improvements Act 2007 as in force today (including any amendments) within the United Kingdom, from legislation.gov.uk.

Instigated as part of a round of transport improvement projects proposed by the then Scottish Executive in 2003, the plan was to open up a fourth direct railway link between the cities of Glasgow and Edinburgh. The project was completed in October 2010, at an estimated cost of £300 million. The rail link received the final approval of the Scottish Parliament on 28 March 2007, and the Airdrie-Bathgate Railway and Linked Improvements Act 2007 (asp 19) gained royal assent on 9 May 2007.

== Background ==
In line with plans to complete the missing part of the M8 motorway, the Executive stipulated that public transport links between Scotland's two largest cities must improve.

The new line reinstates the Bathgate and Coatbridge Railway between Airdrie and Bathgate, closed to passengers in 1956 and to freight in 1982, joining the North Clyde Line of the Glasgow suburban railway network which currently links the North Lanarkshire town of Airdrie to Glasgow Queen Street railway station, to the Edinburgh to Bathgate Line, which connects with the West Coast and East Coast Main Lines at Haymarket. It is now possible to travel from Edinburgh Waverley to Queen Street (Low Level) in around 65 minutes. It will complement the existing "shuttle" service between Queen Street (High Level) and Edinburgh via Falkirk High, which will remain the primary railway link between the two cities, taking around 50 minutes at peak times.

== Benefits and infrastructure improvements ==
The line is intended to bring significant benefits to the West Lothian area, connecting it to the Greater Glasgow conurbation. New stations serve the towns of Caldercruix and Armadale, West Lothian, while the new town of Livingston has an additional direct rail link to Glasgow.

In order to permit four trains per hour in each direction, improvements to the existing line have been made:

- The entire line is double track, doubling the lines between Airdrie and Drumgelloch, and between Bathgate and Cawburn Junction, east of Uphall.
- An upgrade of Newbridge Junction, where the railways from Bathgate and Falkirk to Edinburgh join.
- New stations at Drumgelloch and Bathgate in new locations.
- Electrification of the line between Drumgelloch and Haymarket.

== Progress ==
The start of work was signalled with a sod cutting ceremony at Livingston North station in June 2007, attended by Transport Minister Stewart Stevenson. Contracts worth £300m for design, installation and commissioning of signalling and telecommunications had been awarded by July 2008. Remodelling of Newbridge Junction and doubling of Bathgate branch was completed in October 2008. Blackridge railway station was included as one of the stations to be opened on the line.

Drumgelloch (1989) officially closed after the last train left at 23:08 for Helensburgh Central on 8 May 2010. Drumgelloch opened in December 2010 550 metres to the east. On 27 August 2010 at Drumgelloch, a ceremony took place to lay the last piece of track between Airdrie and Bathgate joining the two towns by rail for the first time since 1982.

With work to install overhead line and signalling equipment for the line complete, it was opened for operational use and driver training on 18 October 2010. Passenger services began on 12 December 2010, as an extension of the existing services to Airdrie on the North Clyde Line, incorporated into National Rail timetable 226. Services are currently hourly (half hourly on weekends). Drumgelloch, Caldercruix and Armadale were initially served by bus substitution services open due to the inclement weather at the end of November 2010 delaying the completion of minor works (including surfacing of car parks).

On 13 February 2011 Caldercruix opened. Armadale opened on 4 March, followed by Drumgelloch on 6 March, thus completing all station work. Effective 7 March, service between Glasgow Queen Street and Edinburgh Waverley increased to two trains per hour on weekdays, Saturdays and Sunday afternoons. On Tuesday 8 March 2011, Scottish Transport Minister Keith Brown officially opened the Airdrie-Bathgate Rail Link.

== See also ==
- Edinburgh to Glasgow Improvement Programme
