= Monkland Railways =

Former railway company in Scotland

The Monkland Railways was a railway company formed in 1848 by the merger of three "coal railways" that had been built to serve coal and iron pits around Airdrie in Central Scotland, and connect them to canals for onward transport of the minerals. The newly formed company had a network stretching from Kirkintilloch to Causewayend, near Linlithgow. These coal railways had had mixed fortunes; the discovery of blackband ironstone and the development of the iron smelting industry around Coatbridge had led to phenomenal success, but hoped-for mineral discoveries in the moorland around Slamannan had been disappointing. The pioneering nature of the railways left them with a legacy of obsolete track and locomotives, and new, more modern, railways were being built around them.

The new company responded with connections to other lines, and to Bo'ness Harbour, and built new lines to Bathgate, but it was taken over by the Edinburgh and Glasgow Railway in 1865. Much of the network was dependent on proximity to pits and ironworks and as those became worked out or declined, the traffic on the network declined too, but the Coatbridge - Airdrie - Bathgate line remained open for passengers until 1956. The section east of Airdrie then closed, except for minor freight movements, but it was reopened in 2010, forming a through passenger route between Glasgow and Edinburgh via Airdrie and Bathgate. Part of the Bo'ness extension line was re-opened as the Bo'ness and Kinneil Railway, a heritage line. The remainder of the system has closed.

The North Monkland Railway was an independent line built to serve pits and quarries to the north of Airdrie beyond the reach of the Monkland Railways system. It opened in 1878 and was taken over in 1888, but it closed in the 1960s.

== Origins: the coal railways ==
=== Monkland and Kirkintilloch Railway ===
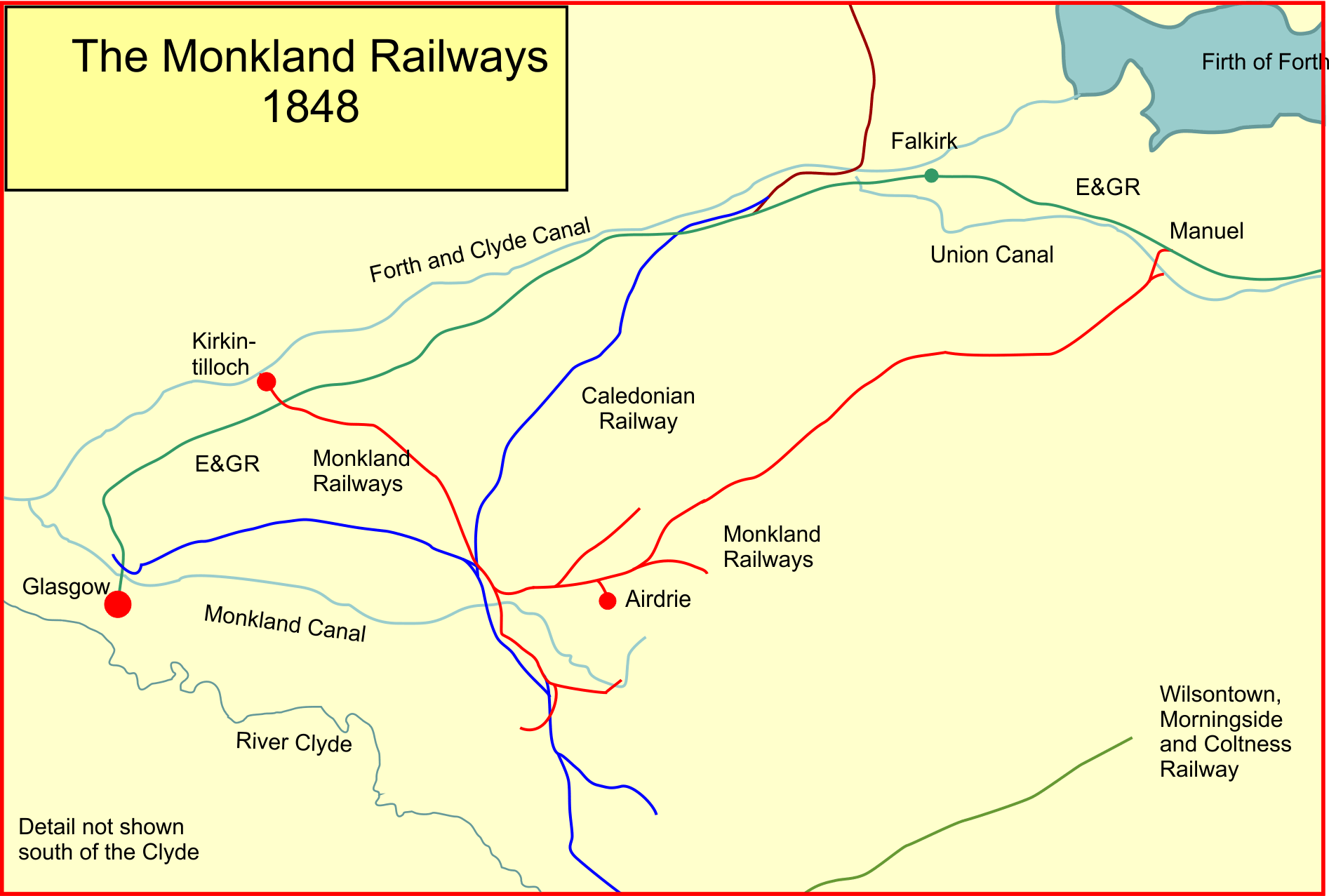
The Monkland Railways system in 1848 showing surrounding transport routes

In 1826 the Monkland and Kirkintilloch Railway (M&KR) opened, with the primary purpose of carrying coal from the Monklands collieries, south of Airdrie to Kirkintilloch, from where it could continue to market in Glasgow and Edinburgh over the Forth and Clyde Canal. As a pioneering railway, it adopted a track gauge of 4 ft 6 in, and at first operated as a toll line, allowing independent hauliers to move wagons, using horse traction. It later acquired steam locomotives and ran trains itself. At first it was successful, and when the iron smelting industry became a huge success within the railway's area, it became even more successful.

=== Ballochney Railway ===
As coal extraction developed, pits were opened further north and east than the M&KR reached, and the Ballochney Railway was constructed to serve some of them, running from Kipps, near Coatbridge, to pits around Arbuckle and Clarkston, and a quarry. It opened in 1828. The area it reached was on high ground, and two rope-worked inclines were necessary to gain altitude.

=== Garnkirk and Glasgow Railway ===
The Garnkirk and Glasgow Railway was opened in 1831 connecting the Monklands directly to Glasgow without the need to transshipment to a canal.

=== Wishaw and Coltness Railway ===
The Wishaw and Coltness Railway opened from 1833, connecting iron pits and works further east to Whifflet (then spelt Whifflat) for access to the Coatbridge ironworks.

=== Slamannan Railway ===
There was a large area of undeveloped moorland between Airdrie and the banks of the Forth, and a railway was promoted to develop the region. There were optimistic ideas of serving new collieries in the area, as well as the advantage of connecting Monklands to Edinburgh more directly. The Slamannan Railway opened in 1840 between Arbuckle and Causewayend, a wharf on the Union Canal; it had a rope worked incline down to the wharf. Onward transport to Edinburgh involved transshipment to canal barges.

== Main line railways ==
The M&KR and the Ballochney companies enjoyed huge commercial success as the iron smelting industry boomed around Coatbridge, and as successful new mineral extraction started around Airdrie, although the Slamannan company's sought-for new mineral business barely materialised. The coal railways collectively worked in a loose collaboration.

At the same time new intercity railways were being promoted and suddenly the coal railways disadvantages seemed dominant. Their near monopoly of mineral traffic in very small areas now seemed to exclude them from areas where new business was being developed, emphasised by the terminating points at canal basins, requiring transshipment to get to destination. Their primitive track on stone block sleepers, their distinct track gauge of 4 ft 6 in also necessitated transshipment where they connected with the new standard gauge lines. Their obsolete locomotives, horse haulage by independent hauliers is some parts, the rope-worked inclines and the antiquated operating methods were all considerable disadvantages.

In 1842 the Edinburgh and Glasgow Railway (E&GR) opened its main line (to Haymarket at first) on the standard gauge of 4 ft 8½ in with modern locomotives. At this time the Caledonian Railway was promoting a new trunk line from Carlisle to Glasgow and Edinburgh; it got its authorising act of Parliament, the Edinburgh and Glasgow Railway Act 1845 (8 & 9 Vict. c. xci), in 1845 and opened in 1847/1848. It sought acquisition of the Wishaw and Coltness Railway and the Garnkirk and Glasgow Railway to get access to Glasgow, and it concluded a lease of those lines. Suddenly those lines were out of the group of mutually friendly coal railways, and soon they were simply part of the Caledonian Railway.

The three other coal railways (M&KR, Ballochney and Slamannan) decided that their interests lay in collaboration, and they formed a joint working arrangement from 29 March 1845; in effect the three companies worked as one.

In 1844 the M&KR had built a short spur to transshipment sidings with the E&GR at Garngaber, a little east of the present-day Lenzie station. The inconvenience of the transshipment emphasised the disadvantage of the now non-standard track gauge, and it was decided to change the track gauge to standard gauge. They got Parliamentary authority and made the change on 26 July and 27 July 1847.

Operating costs were high: from 1845 to 1848 the ratio for the three railways that formed the Monkland Railways averaged 55%. Giving evidence at the hearing of the Monklands Amalgamation Bill in 1848, George Knight, secretary and General Manager of the three railways explained that:

The Monklands complex consisted of 36 miles of railway proper and 12 miles of sidings, and had connected it with another 48 miles of private railways built by the various extractive and industrial interests. Although a through journey of 25 miles was possible on the system—from the eastern end of the Slamannan to the Kirkintilloch canal basin—30% of all traffic travelled less than a mile, and half of it less than 2½ miles. Hence locomotives were involved in a ceaseless pattern of stopping and shunting, and averaged only 24 miles per day against the 90 miles normal on the Edinburgh & Glasgow.

The sidings were expensive to work, and even private sidings required main line points which had to be renewed every three or four years ... these numerous points also meant the employment of a large number of men to supervise them. Traders could also benefit from using the company's waggons, and were not charged for their use on sidings and private lines. [The waggons] averaged only 5¼ miles per day against 23 miles on the Edinburgh & Glasgow.

== Formal merger ==
In 1846 it became clear that the E&GR directors favoured a purchase of the coal railways, giving it immediate access to the collieries and ironworks, and gaining possession of the territory against newly promoted lines. Such a sale appeared at first to please everyone, but Lancashire shareholders in the E&GR felt that the terms of such a takeover were too favourable to the small Scottish lines, and a major row broke out in the E&GR: the scheme was dropped. In this period, numerous other railways were promoted and alliances seemed to be formed and abandoned quickly, but the only large newcomers were the E&GR and the Caledonian Railway.

Monkland Railways Act 1848
- Act of Parliament
- Parliament of the United Kingdom
- Long title: An Act to amalgamate the Monkland and Kirkintilloch, Ballochney, and Slamannan Railways.
- Citation: 11 & 12 Vict. c. cxxxiv

Dates
- Royal assent: 14 August 1848

Text of statute as originally enacted

Having been rebuffed by the E&GR, the Monkland companies decided upon a formal merger, and obtained the necessary sanction by an act of Parliament, the Monkland Railways Act 1848 (11 & 12 Vict. c. cxxxiv) on 14 August 1848. The new Monkland Railways Company was formed with a nominal share capital of £329,880, the sum of the capital of the three former companies; the shares were converted as follows:

- Monkland and Kirkintilloch Railway £25 shares converted to £22 16s 0d in Monkland Railways shares
- Ballochney Railways Railway £25 shares converted to £40 10s 10d in Monkland Railways shares
- Slamannan Railway Railway £50 shares converted to £22 15s 10d in Monkland Railways shares.

With revenue of about £100,000 annually it was a profitable concern.

== New lines ==
=== Slamannan Junction Railway ===
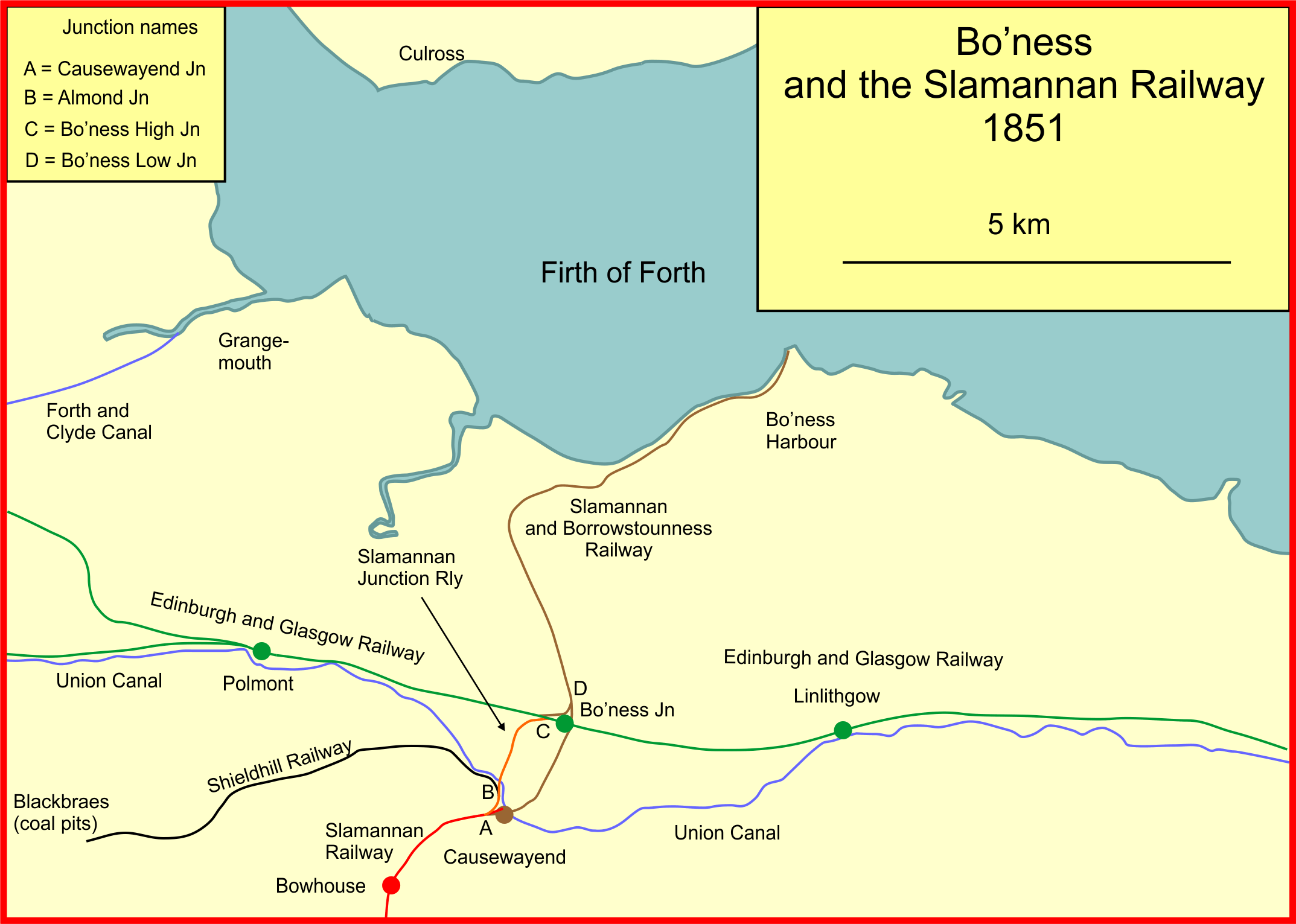
Branches at Bo'ness and Causewayend

The Slamannan Railway terminated at Causewayend, a wharf on the Union Canal. This was close to the new E&GR main line, and a connection seemed desirable. An independent company, the Slamannan Junction Railway, was formed to build the link; the submission to Parliament for an act of Parliament was supported financially by the E&GR and the Monkland joint companies together. In fact its shareholders sold the company to the E&GR immediately after obtaining the enabling act of Parliament, the Slamannan Junction Railway Act 1844 (7 & 8 Vict. c. lxx), and the E&GR built the line from Bo'ness Junction (later renamed Manuel High Level) on the E&GR main line to Causewayend. The short line was completed by January 1847, but remained dormant until the Monkland lines altered their line to standard gauge, in August 1847.

=== Bo'ness ===
The harbour at Borrowstounness (Bo'ness) was also not far from Causewayend, and a connection to it was desirable, enabling export and coastwise mineral trade. In addition there were ironstone pits and blast furnaces at Kinneil. The nominally independent Slamannan and Borrowstounness Railway (S&BR) had been promoted by the Slamannan company to connect to Bo'ness Harbour, with a link to the E&GR west of Bo'ness Junction (later Manuel) so aligned as to allow through running from the Polmont direction to Bo'ness. The unbuilt line was absorbed into the Monkland Railways at the time of formation of that company, but the subscribed capital of £105,000 was to be kept separate. The Slamannan and Borrowstounness Railway Act 1846 (9 & 10 Vict. c. cvii) of 26 June 1846 specified that the Union Canal was to be crossed by a drawbridge or swing bridge, and that screens were to be provided to avoid frightening horses drawing barges on the canal. In fact the E&GR made considerable difficulties over the construction of the new bridge to pass the S&BR line under their own main line, and construction was delayed until 1848. With a resumption of friendly relations, it now appeared that some construction could be avoided if Slamannan to Bo'ness trains used the Slamannan Junction line to Bo'ness Junction on the E&GR and then the proposed Bo'ness Junction connection towards Bo'ness, so that trains would join and then immediately leave the E&GR main line.

Monkland Railways (Slamannan and Borrowstouness Deviation) Act 1851
- Act of Parliament
- Parliament of the United Kingdom
- Long title: An Act to authorize certain Deviations of the Slamannan and Borrowstouness Railway.
- Citation: 14 & 15 Vict. c. lxii

Dates
- Royal assent: 3 July 1851

Text of statute as originally enacted

In 1850, as construction was progressing, it was belatedly realised that the configuration of the junctions on the E&GR main line was such that a through movement would be impossible; trains would have to shunt back on the E&GR main line. In addition the E&GR made stipulations about the composition of the Monkland wagon wheels which were impracticable to comply with. Accordingly, the Monkland Railways decided (in May 1850) to complete the originally intended through line from Causewayend after all. The E&GR took umbrage at this and put further difficulties in the way of the underbridge construction and disputation dragged on until May 1851. The Monkland Railways now got a fresh act of Parliament, the Monkland Railways (Slamannan and Borrowstouness Deviation) Act 1851 (14 & 15 Vict. c. lxii) authorising some deviations of the new line, and the substitution of a fixed bridge over the Union Canal.

The approach to Bo'ness Harbour itself was to be along the foreshore there, and the company was obliged to build a promenade on the sea side of the railway line there. John Wilson, the proprietor of important iron works at Kinneil obtained permission to run some mineral trains there while the line was still under construction, and the first trains ran from Arden on 17 March 1851, but opening from the E&GR line at Bo'ness Junction (Manuel) took place in early August 1851, with the undesirable backshunt on the E&GR main line now apparently permitted. Full opening of the through line took place on 22 December 1851.

Passenger traffic started, after some difficulties in obtaining approval, on 10 June 1856.

=== Bathgate ===
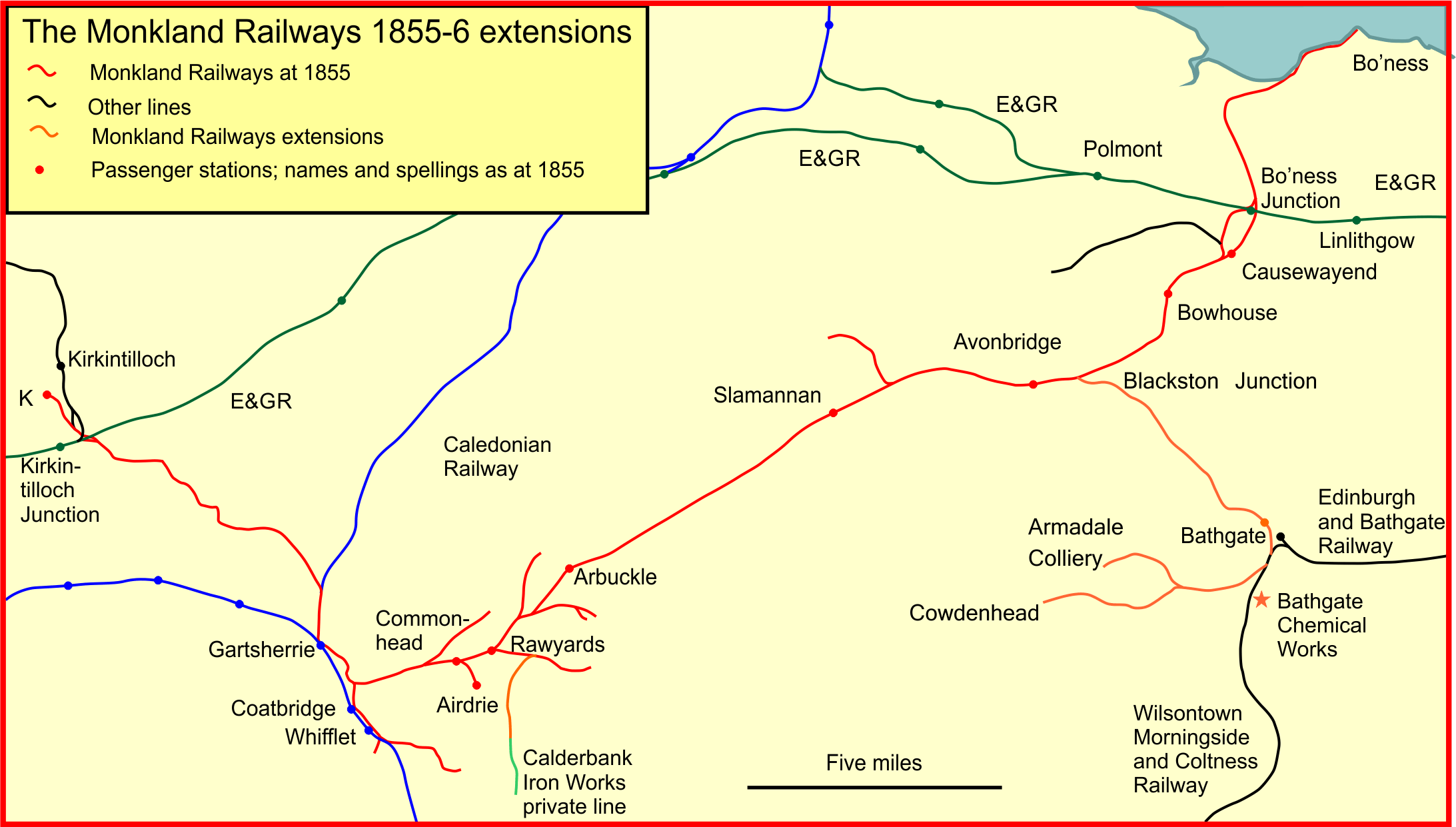
Monkland Railway extensions 1855-6

The Bathgate Chemical Works was established in 1851, in open country a mile or so south of the town. James Young, an industrial chemist, had developed an industrial process of manufacturing paraffin from torbanite, a type of oil shale. He had obtained a patent for the process in October 1850, and the torbanite had been discovered on the Torbanehill estate, about halfway between Bathgate and Whitburn. Young joined in partnership with Edward William Binney and Edward Meldrum and the Bathgate works started operations in February 1851. It was located alongside the Wilsontown, Morningside and Coltness Railway (WM&CR) on its branch to Bathgate.

Monkland Railways Branches Act 1853
- Act of Parliament
- Parliament of the United Kingdom
- Long title: An Act to enable the Monkland Railways Company to make certain Railways in the Vicinity of Bathgate and Airdrie; and for other Purposes.
- Citation: 16 & 17 Vict. c. xc

Dates
- Royal assent: 8 July 1853

Text of statute as originally enacted

The chemical works, the torbanite fields, and the coal deposits in the area generally were attractive as a source of revenue for the Monkland Railways, and they obtained an act of Parliament, the Monkland Railways Branches Act 1853 (16 & 17 Vict. c. xc) giving powers in July 1853 to construct a railway from Blackstone (often spelt Blackston) on the Slamannan line just east of Avonbridge to the WM&CR line near Boghead. Boghead is immediately south of Bathgate, and the new line would pass through the torbanite fields, but skirt past Bathgate and join the WM&CR facing away from the town, but towards the Works. In addition, a branch from the WM&CR to Armadale Toll and to Cowdenhead (about a mile west of Armadale town, later Woodend Junction, to collieries) was authorised.

A train of coal wagons passed along the Bathgate branch on 11 June 1855, apparently while the line was still in the possession of the contractors. The company applied for authority to run passenger trains to Bathgate; this was repeatedly refused: there were no platforms nor a turntable at Bathgate, nor any signalling there or at Blackstone. The Board of Trade Inspector visited the line in 1856 to review the proposals for passenger operation; he reported that there was no turntable at Bathgate, but that one had been ordered. He continued:

The Bathgate and Bo'ness [routes] form a junction at Blackstone; from thence the traffic of the two branches will be conducted separately along the single line common to both, as far as Avon Bridge, a distance of three-quarters of a mile, then they will be united in one train, and proceed to Glasgow. To prevent any danger along the portion of line common to the two branches, the Bathgate train, both in going and returning, will have the precedence: the signal man at Blackstone will have instructions not to turn off the signal of the Boness branch until the Bathgate train has passed on its way to Avon-Bridge; of the train proceeding to Bathgate and Boness, the latter will follow the Bathgate train at an interval not less than five minutes.

The turntable was provided, and Monkland Railways passenger operation to Bathgate started on 7 July 1856. The Bathgate station was at the end of Cochrane Street, and later became Bathgate Lower station.

=== Calderbank ===
The 1853 act also gave authority for a branch from Colliertree, near Rawyards, southwards to Brownsburn, where the Calderbank Iron Works would join it with an internal private railway. The Monkland Railways portion was to be 1 mile 32 chains (2.3 km). The mineral line was opened on 1 October 1855. (Some contemporary maps misleadingly refer to the Clarkston line at Rawyards as "the Brownsburn Branch".)

=== Closing the gap ===
Monkland Railways Branches Act 1857
- Act of Parliament
- Parliament of the United Kingdom
- Long title: An Act to enable the Monkland Railways Company to make and maintain certain Railways in the Counties of Lanark and Linlithgow; and for other Purposes.
- Citation: 20 & 21 Vict. c. lxxviii

Dates
- Royal assent: 27 July 1857

Text of statute as originally enacted

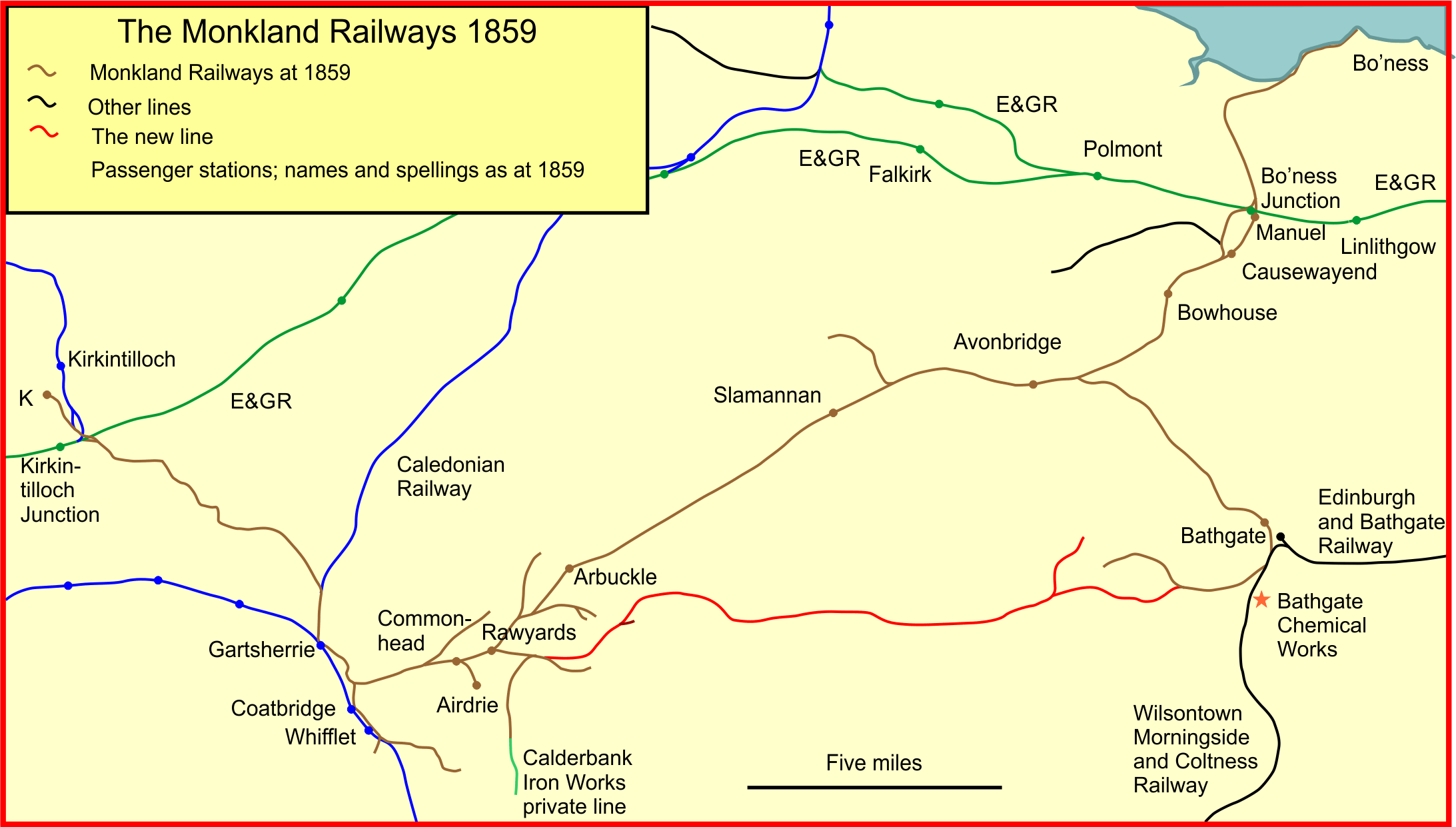
Monkland Railways in 1859

The Monkland Iron and Steel Company had extensive mineral workings in the Armadale area at Cowdenhead, now connected to the extension from Bathgate, and their iron works was at Calderbank, near Airdrie. There was immediately a considerable traffic from the mines to the works, and it made a long detour, starting eastwards from Armadale, away from the direction of Calderbank, and then round via Slamannan. The company observed that the gap of ten miles could be closed relatively cheaply, and a direct line would also connect worthwhile coalfields on the way, as well as the important paper works at Caldercruix. An act of Parliament, the Monkland Railways Branches Act 1857 (20 & 21 Vict. c. lxxviii) was obtained for the purpose in July 1857 in the teeth of considerable opposition from rival promoters and others.

The act authorised a large number of branch connections and other lines, and these were constructed in priority order, with the central part of the through connection delayed.

First was a short westwards extension from Cowdenhead to Standhill Junction, and from there turning back to Craigmill (otherwise known as the Woodend Branch), opened on 1 November 1858, to serve the Coltness Iron Company's mineral workings there. Similarly a short eastwards extension was made from a junction to the Clarkston Wester Monkland branch back to Stepends, with a short branch there for Wilson & Co. of Summerlee Iron Works. Wilson built an internal network with a zigzag to gain height on Annies Hill. A further branch turned back from Barblues to Meadowhead Pit. The pit was close to the Ballochney workings, but the location was referred to then as Planes, later spelt Plains. These extensions were completed by early February 1860. However the Stepends branch was short lived: it closed in 1878.

That left two sections. The first was the gap from Barblues (sometimes spelt Barbleus, near Stepends) to Standhill Junction (near Blackridge; the junction was with the uncompleted Shotts Iron Works line (below), and that was completed by 27 April 1861 when a trial mineral train passed over the line; full opening to mineral trains was about 10 May 1861. This enabled through running from Coatbridge to Bathgate, but over the Ballochney inclines and running north of Airdrie.

The second gap was the line south of Airdrie, from Sunnyside Junction to Brownieside Junction, avoiding the rope worked inclines. This may have opened, also for mineral traffic only, in early August 1861.

Passenger working between Coatbridge and Bathgate started on 11 August 1862; however there was no direct route to Glasgow yet, except over the former Garnkirk railway Caledonian section.

The New Line is sometimes referred to as the Bathgate and Coatbridge Railway, but it was never independent of the Monkland Railways. However an independent Bathgate, Airdrie and Coatbridge Railway had been proposed in 1856.

=== Shotts iron works ===
Monkland Railways (Branches) Act 1860
- Act of Parliament
- Parliament of the United Kingdom
- Long title: An Act to enable the Monkland Railways Company to make and maintain a Branch Railway to Shotts Ironworks, and certain other Branches and Works in the Counties of Lanark and Linlithgow; and for other Purposes.
- Citation: 23 & 24 Vict. c. clxxviii

Dates
- Royal assent: 6 August 1860

Text of statute as originally enacted

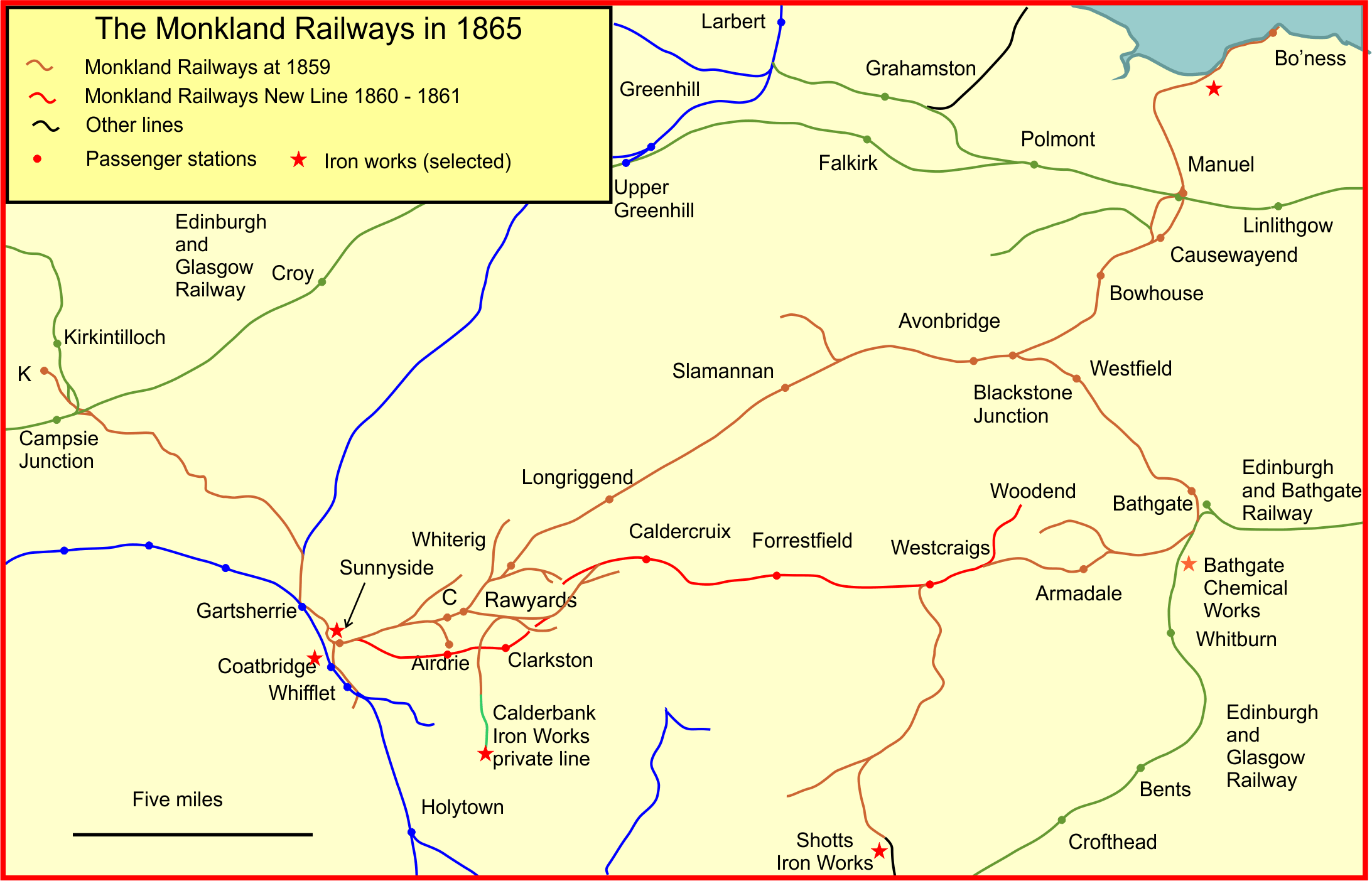
Monkland Railways system in 1865

The important iron works at Shotts was connected to the Wilsontown, Morningside and Coltness Railway but the works owner obviously wanted an alternative carrier, and approached the Monklands company to propose a branch line southwards from the "new line". This was agreed to, and an act of Parliament, the Monkland Railways (Branches) Act 1860 (23 & 24 Vict. c. clxxviii) giving authority for the 5 1/2-mile line was obtained in August 1860. The line opened by 5 February 1862. A short branch off the branch to West Benhar was built in 1864.

== Absorbed by the E&GR ==
Edinburgh and Glasgow and Monkland Railways Amalgamation Act 1865
- Act of Parliament
- Parliament of the United Kingdom
- Long title: An Act to amalgamate the Monkland Railways Company with the Edinburgh and Glasgow Railway Company.
- Citation: 28 & 29 Vict. c. ccxvii

Dates
- Royal assent: 5 July 1865

Text of statute as originally enacted

The Monkland Railways Company was absorbed by the Edinburgh and Glasgow Railway by the Edinburgh and Glasgow and Monkland Railways Amalgamation Act 1865 (28 & 29 Vict. c. ccxvii), dated 5 July 1865, on 31 July 1865. The following day, that company was itself absorbed by the North British Railway.

The larger company used the acquisition to consolidate its dominance of mineral traffic in the Monklands coalfield and in connection with the iron works in the area. The Monklands section it had acquired was profitable, although its operating costs were very high, and it was concentrated in mining areas generally remote from the large population centres. However the best of the mineral deposits had been worked out, and the focus of the extractive industries had shifted into Caledonian Railway territory.

The North British Railway set about rectifying the lack of good connection to Glasgow, and in 1871 the Coatbridge to Glasgow line was opened, from Whifflet. For the time being the Glasgow terminal was inconveniently located at College, later High Street, but the growth of daily travel to work by suburban train motivated the NBR to work towards a better network in the city. The Airdrie terminal of the Ballochney Railway (Hallcraig Street) was closed to passengers in 1870.

== North Monkland Railway ==
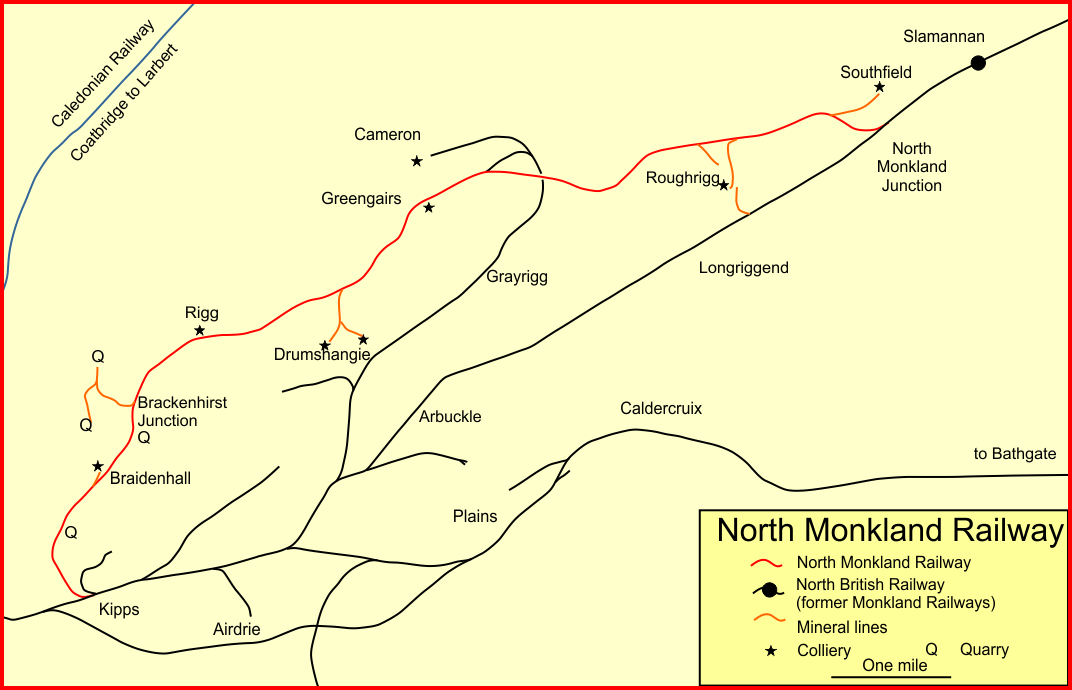
North Monkland Railway system

Coal extraction continued to flourish in the second half of the nineteenth century, and new pits opened throughout the Monklands area. Many of these were remote from the network of the Monklands section of the North British Railway, and many private mineral branch lines and tramways were built to close the gaps. Quarrying was also an important activity.

North Monkland Railways Act 1872
- Act of Parliament
- Parliament of the United Kingdom
- Long title: An Act for making Railways in the counties of Lanark and Stirling, to be called "The North Monkland Railways;" and for other purposes.
- Citation: 35 & 36 Vict. c. xci

Dates
- Royal assent: 18 July 1872

A new railway was promoted to reach some of the pits and quarries north of the Ballochney and Slamannan lines, and the North Monkland Railway got an authorising act of Parliament, the North Monkland Railways Act 1872 (35 & 36 Vict. c. xci) on 18 July 1872. The line was opened on 18 February 1878, and carried goods and mineral traffic only. It ran from Kipps via Nettlehole and Greengairs, to join the Slamannan line at Southfield Row, an existing colliery spur south of Longriggend.

It connected into numerous collieries on the route, and many short mineral lines were built off the main line to connect the pits.

The line sold itself to the North British Railway effective from 31 July 1888, authorised by the North British Railway Act 1888 (51 & 52 Vict. c. clxiii), the £10 shares being bought out at £6 each.

== The twentieth century ==
The Monkland Railways were now just a network of branches of the North British Railway, concentrating on serving collieries and ironworks, and the communities that built up around them. The through Bathgate - Airdrie - Coatbridge line became an important secondary line for passengers and freight.

However many of the more remote localities were dependent on the mineral activity they served, and after World War I there was some geological exhaustion as well as competition from cheap foreign imports. This intensified after World War II, by which time the North British Railway had formed a constituent of the London and North Eastern Railway in 1923, and then been nationalised into the Scottish Region of British Railways in 1948. Now many of the pits and ironworks were declining substantially or closing, and the mineral branches closed with them.

The Rosehall branch had already closed in 1930, and the Slamannan line, passing through remote and thinly populated territory, closed in 1949. The Cairnhill line closed in the 1950s.

The communities of Airdrie and Coatbridge continued to flourish, enhanced by other economic activity associated with the West of Scotland, but the through line from Airdrie to Bathgate closed to passenger traffic in 1956.

A limited goods service continued on the line until l February 1982 but the line then closed completely, except for the short section from Airdrie to Moffat Mills, which remained open for goods traffic; however this was sporadic.

The Benhar mines, the branch network based on the Westcraigs to Shotts Iron Works branch, closed in 1963, and the North Monkland section closed the following year, together with the Bathgate to Blackston Junction line. The original line to Kirkintilloch closed in 1965 except for a short section to Leckethall Siding, which continued until 1982. The Ballochney section closed in 1966.

== Reopening ==
When the Airdrie to Bathgate section closed to goods traffic, a short stub was left at Airdrie to Moffat Mills. Although officially "open" it was in fact dormant for many years. As passenger suburban travel in Greater Glasgow experience a revival, a short extension along this line to a Drumgelloch station, on the eastern margin of Airdrie, was electrified and opened, in 1989.

The line onward from Drumgelloch to Bathgate was reopened on 12 December 2010 as an electrified railway with a frequent passenger service between Edinburgh and Glasgow. This proved remarkably successful. Difficult weather prevented immediate opening of all the intermediate stations, and Armadale opened on 4 March 2011, followed by a new Drumgelloch station, further east than the earlier one and close to the former Clarkston station site, on 6 March 2011.

== Current operations ==
The largest section of the Monkland Railways network now in operation is the line between Coatbridge and Bathgate; it carries (2015) a well-patronised fifteen-minute interval passenger service between Helensburgh and Milngavie, and Edinburgh.

The north-south line between Gartsherrie and Whifflet carries freight, and the Gartsherrie to Garnqueen section carries a passenger service to Cumbernauld, the remnant of the earlier anomaly where Caledonian express trains used this North British Railway section.

The remainder of the network is closed. The Ballochney inclines in the Airdrie area are still easy to identify, and the moorland area of the Slamannan line is relatively undeveloped, except nearer Airdrie where extensive open-cast mining has obliterated any remaining trace of the railway.
