= Bathgate and Coatbridge Railway =

Railway in the UK

The Bathgate and Coatbridge Railway, also known as the "New Monkland Line", was built by Monkland Railways. It opened on 28 July 1863. The line was absorbed into the Edinburgh and Glasgow Railway on 31 July 1865. The following day (1 August 1865), the line became part of the North British Railway.

== Closure ==
The last regular passenger train along this route between Glasgow and Edinburgh ran on 8 January 1956 (the line henceforth being closed to passengers east of Airdrie). Freight services continued until February 1982, then the line was lifted.

== Connections to other lines ==
- At Greenside Junction (between Coatbridge Sunnyside and Coatdyke) to the Monkland and Kirkintilloch Railway
- At Brownieside Junction to the Ballochney Railway
- At Westcraigs to the Shotts branch of Wilsontown, Morningside and Coltness Railway
- At Polkemmet Junction to the Wilsontown, Morningside and Coltness Railway

== Reopening ==
The section between Drumgelloch and Bathgate was reopened and electrified in October 2010, thus linking the current North Clyde Line with the Edinburgh to Bathgate Line. Work to reopen the line started with a sod cutting ceremony in June 2007.
