= Airdrie Library =

Public library in North Lanarkshire, Scotland

Coordinates: 55°52′00″N 03°58′59″W

Airdrie Library is a public library in Airdrie, North Lanarkshire, Scotland. The library has been housed in a number of buildings since its founding.

== History of the two Carnegie library buildings and the observatory ==
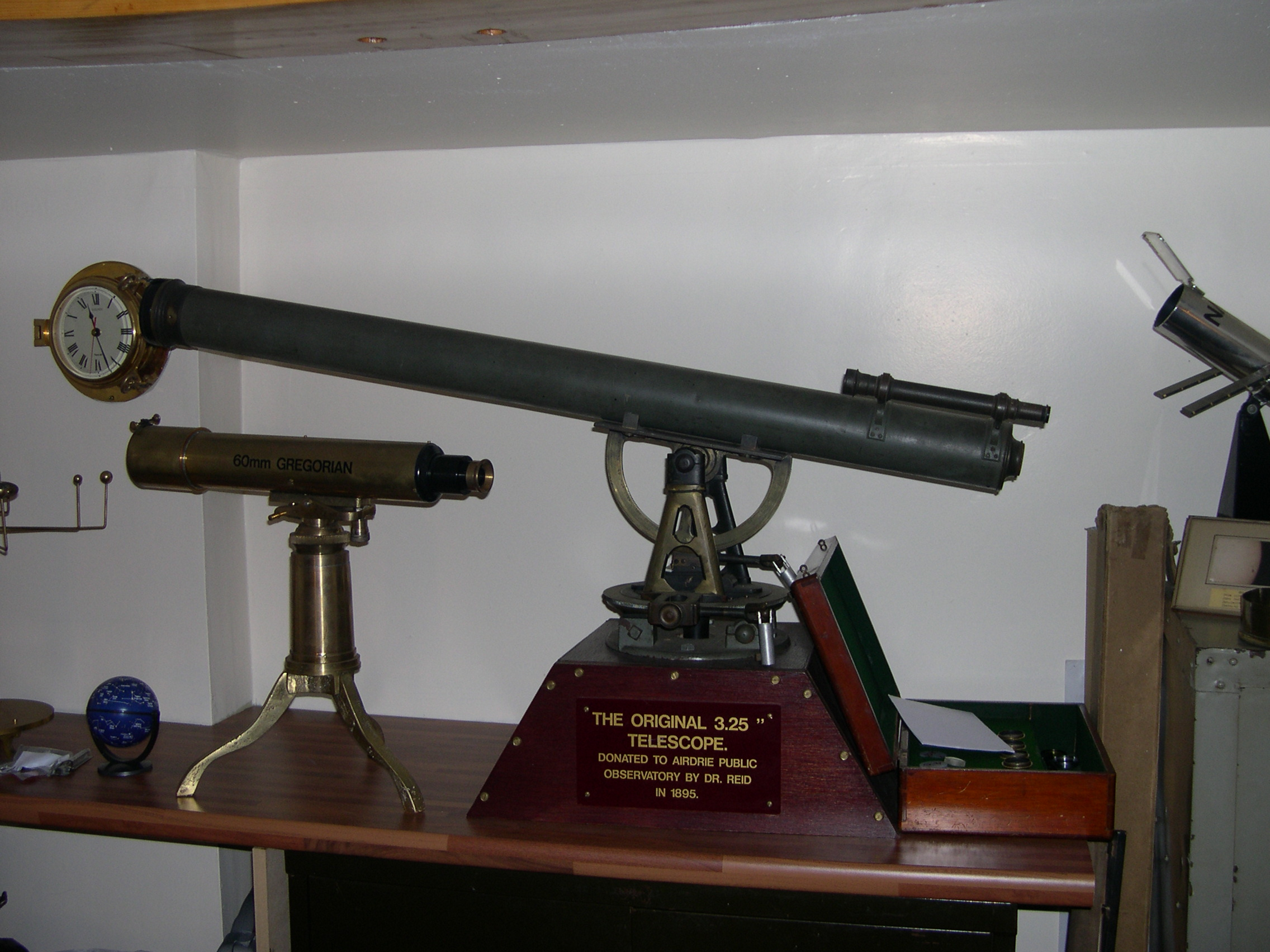
Dr Reid's 3.25-inch (83 mm) refractor telescope in Airdrie Observatory

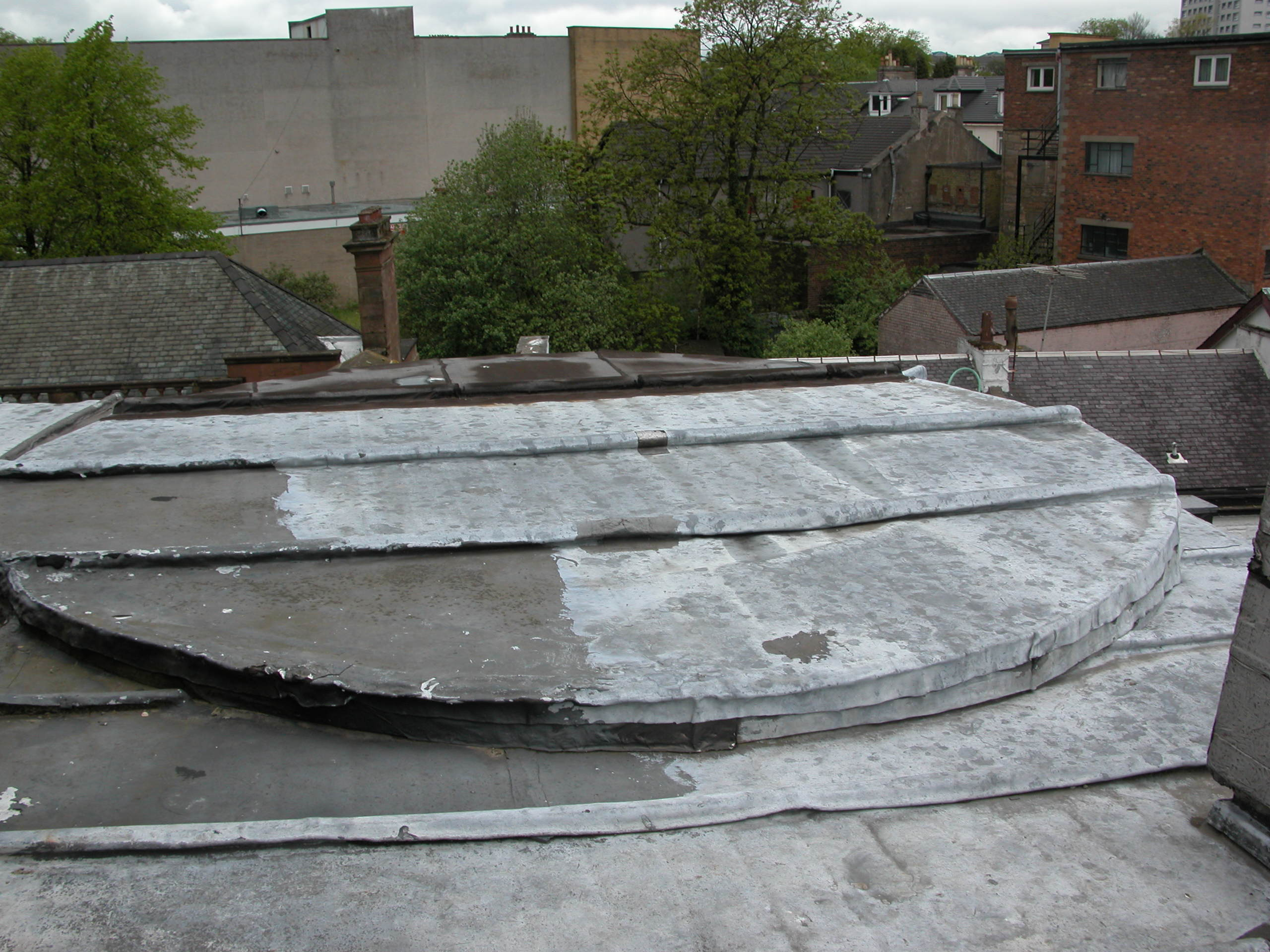
Roof dome site of original observatory on Anderson Street

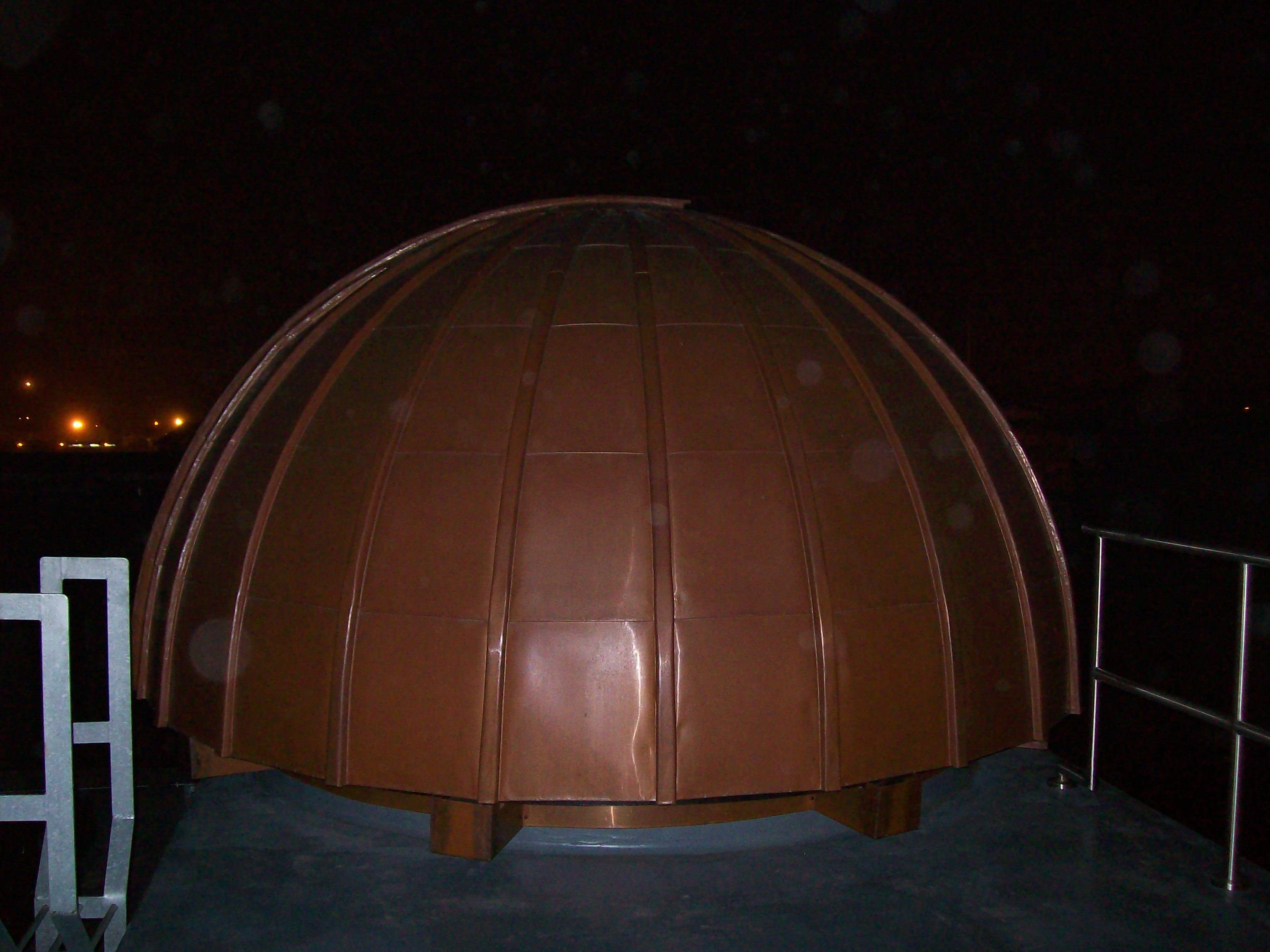
New Rooftop Dome of Airdrie Observatory

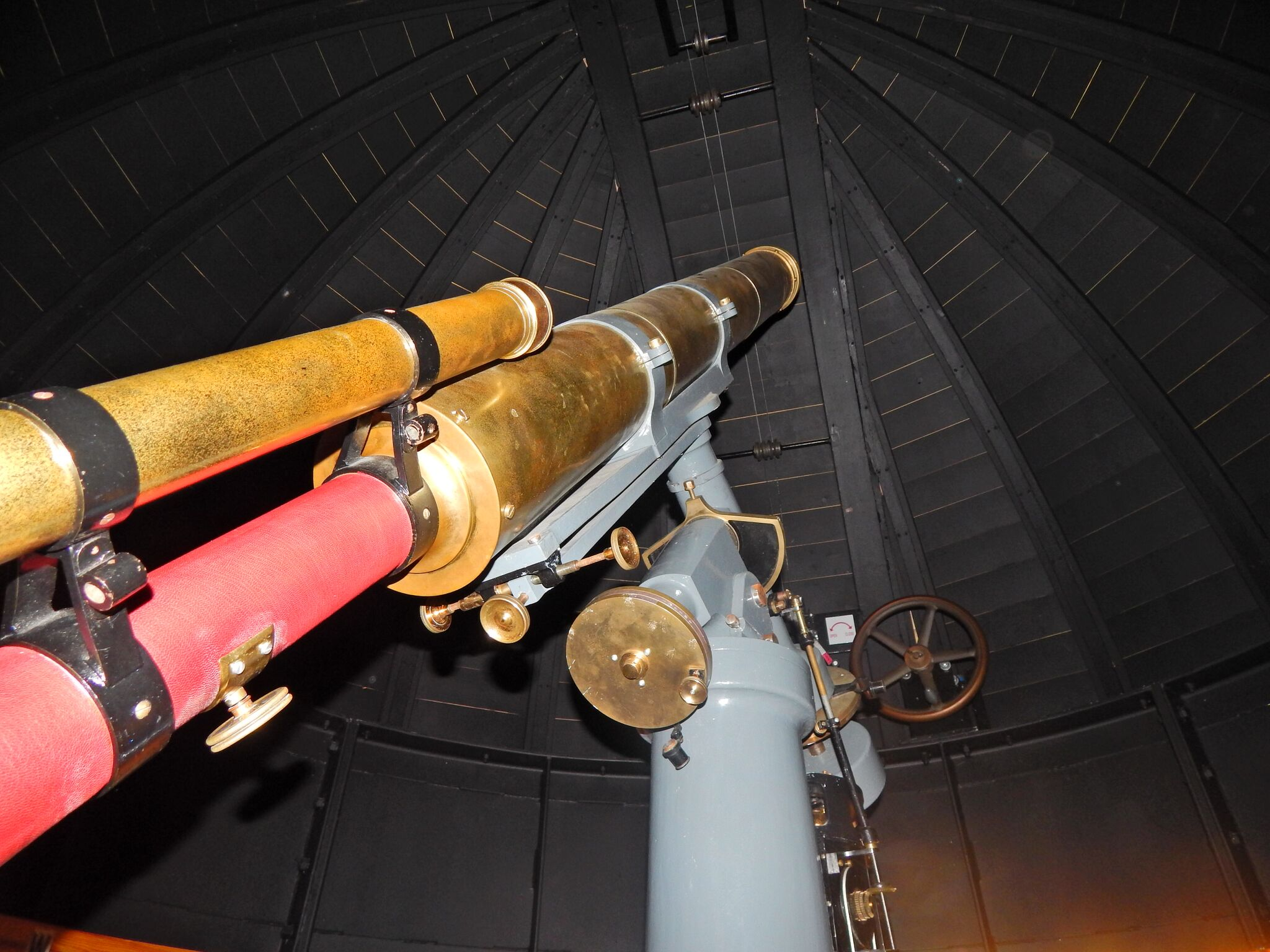
Refurbished Wray of London telescope in Airdrie Observatory

The history of the library dates back to the 1850s when the town adopted the Public Libraries Act. Its first home was a room in the town hall, or Town House as it was called. From 1860 it moved a number of times until the opening of its current home in 1925.

There have been two buildings purpose-built for the library. The first was opened in 1894 by a public subscription of more than £1000 and a £1000 donation from Andrew Carnegie (the Scottish born philanthropist) on Anderson Street, today's Airdrie Arts Centre. MP Sir John Wilson gave a further £1000 to write off accompanying debt.

Unusually, the library has shared a common history with an observatory. Airdrie Observatory was founded in this building in 1896.

The 1894 building proved too small. The second purpose-built, and current, building was designed by JM Arthur, and opened on 25 September 1925, funded by Airdrie Savings Bank and a second Carnegie grant. The local newspaper, the Airdrie and Coatbridge Advertiser had this to say the next day; "Although not quite finished the new Library building in Wellwynde Street was sufficiently far advanced towards completion to allow the opening ceremony to take place yesterday afternoon".

The observatory moved along with the library, a purpose-built observatory being built on the library roof and a brass 6-inch (150 mm) refracting telescope was obtained by the observatory curator Ex-Baillie James Lewis for the sum of £500. The original Dr Reid telescope was also brought from the old observatory.

== Covenanters' flag ==
In 1920, the library was gifted a Covenanters' flag, carried in the Battle of Bothwell Bridge, by John Main, Laird of Ballochney. The flag suffered degradation due to light exposure, but underwent restoration, completed in 2002, and was re-displayed.

== Chronology ==
=== 1853 ===
In August the Public Libraries Act (Scotland) was passed, and in November Airdrie was the first Scottish town to adopt it, beating Dunfermline into second place by 13 years.

=== 1856 ===
A quantity of books were obtained for the sum of £40 from the Institution of Mechanical Engineers and the library opened in the clerks office in the Town House, now known as the Town Clock.

=== 1892 ===
Andrew Carnegie had promised in a letter to Mr Thomas Jeffrey of Airdrie Savings Bank an amount of money equaling £1,000 (being half of the money required to build a new library) so long as a piece of land was acquired and the other half of the money was raised locally. On receiving this guarantee, a public appeal was launched on 13 June 1892 for funds, and by October 1892 more than £1,000 had been raised. With more than £2,000, plans were drawn up to build the new Library on Anderson Street.

=== 1894 ===
The new library was opened and MP Sir John Wilson wrote off some accompanying debt to the amount of £1,000 which allowed the new library to operate debt free from then on.

=== 1896 ===
==== 28 April Airdrie Observatory ====
Dr. Thomas Reid, an eminent Glasgow oculist, donated a 3-inch (76 mm) brass-bodied, refracting telescope to the town, and it was housed in the library. He also donated the sum of £35 to convert a top-floor room, where a dome was built on the roof of the building for it. Thus founding Airdrie Observatory. Robert Dunlop was the first Honorary Curator, followed shortly by Mr Peter Scotland.

=== 1925 ===
==== 25 September ====
A new library was built near the first purpose-built library with financial assistance from Airdrie Savings Bank and a second grant from the Carnegie United Kingdom Trust. A new purpose-built observatory was built on the library roof. It is currently curated by Airdrie Astronomical Association (AAA)

== External Source ==
- Official Airdrie Library Website
