= List of listed buildings in Airdrie, North Lanarkshire =

This is a list of listed buildings in the parish of Airdrie in North Lanarkshire, Scotland.

== List ==
Name	Location	Date listed	Grid ref. (Note: Sometimes known as OSGB36, the grid reference (where provided) is based on the British national grid reference system used by the Ordnance Survey. • "Guide to National Grid". Ordnance Survey. • "Get-a-map". Ordnance Survey.)	Geo-coordinates	Notes	LB number (Note: Historic Environment Scotland assign a unique alphanumeric identifier to each designated site in Scotland, for listed buildings this always begins with "LB", for example "LB12345".)	Image
Bank Street, The Townhouse				55°52′00″N 3°58′50″W	Category B	20926	Upload another image
Towers Road, Wester Moffat Hospital, Wester Moffat House				55°52′07″N 3°56′27″W	Category B	20930	Upload Photo
2-10 (Even Nos) Bank Street, New Cross Corner				55°51′59″N 3°58′50″W	Category B	20936	Upload Photo
1 Kippen Street, Rochsolloch Primary School Including Boundary Wall And Railings				55°51′43″N 3°59′49″W	Category C(S)	20943	Upload another image See more images
14 Anderson Street				55°52′01″N 3°58′56″W	Category C(S)	48540	Upload Photo
16-20 (Even Nos) And 24-28 (Even Nos) Anderson Street				55°52′01″N 3°58′58″W	Category B	48541	Upload Photo
East High Street, Fruitfield House				55°52′09″N 3°58′51″W	Category C(S)	48548	Upload Photo
Grahamshill Street, Annfield				55°52′06″N 3°57′36″W	Category C(S)	48552	Upload Photo
North Biggar Road, Stanley Old College Gate Fragment				55°52′07″N 3°58′06″W	Category B	48556	Upload Photo
4 And 6 Victoria Place, (Swiss Villa And Clydesdale) Including Gates And Railings				55°51′48″N 3°58′58″W	Category B	48560	Upload Photo
Wellwynd, Former West Parish Church				55°51′59″N 3°59′03″W	Category B	20921	Upload another image
Wellwynd, Wellwynd Church, Church Of Scotland				55°52′03″N 3°58′59″W	Category C(S)	20923	Upload Photo
5-11 (Odd Nos), 4 And 6 Dornoch Way, Former Cairnhill Stables				55°51′16″N 3°59′16″W	Category B	20927	Upload Photo
24 Victoria Place, The Red House Including Boundary Wall And Gatepiers				55°51′46″N 3°59′12″W	Category B	20951	Upload Photo
54 Victoria Place, The Anchorage Including Boundary Wall And Gatepiers				55°51′44″N 3°59′25″W	Category B	48563	Upload Photo
23 And 25 Wellwynd				55°52′03″N 3°59′01″W	Category C(S)	20929	Upload Photo
Springwells Avenue, St Paul's Episcopal Church Including Church Hall And Boundary Wall				55°52′07″N 3°57′56″W	Category C(S)	20931	Upload another image
Johnston Street, Flowerhill Parish Church, Church Of Scotland, Including Church Hall And Manse				55°52′01″N 3°58′34″W	Category B	20932	Upload another image
Broomknoll Street, Monklands District Council Housing Department				55°51′53″N 3°58′48″W	Category C(S)	20938	Upload Photo
5 Graham Street Including Flanking Walls				55°51′59″N 3°58′48″W	Category B	20940	Upload Photo
56 Stirling Street, Airdrie Savings Bank Including Gatepiers And Gates				55°51′58″N 3°58′59″W	Category B	20949	Upload Photo
6, 8 And 8A East High Street				55°52′07″N 3°58′55″W	Category C(S)	48550	Upload Photo
Graham Street, Airdrie Baptist Church Including Boundary Wall And Gatepiers				55°52′00″N 3°58′33″W	Category C(S)	48551	Upload Photo
North Biggar Road, 2 And 3 Stanley Park Including Boundary Wall And Gatepiers				55°52′07″N 3°58′08″W	Category C(S)	48555	Upload another image
10 Stirling Street				55°51′58″N 3°58′53″W	Category B	48559	Upload Photo
16 And 18 North Bridge Street, Airdrie Children's Board				55°52′08″N 3°58′58″W	Category B	20944	Upload another image
Broomknoll Street, Broomknoll Parish Church, Church Of Scotland				55°51′54″N 3°58′51″W	Category C(S)	48544	Upload Photo
2 East High Street				55°52′07″N 3°58′56″W	Category C(S)	48549	Upload Photo
2-10 (Even Nos) Hallcraig Street, Airdrie Market Building				55°52′02″N 3°58′49″W	Category C(S)	48553	Upload Photo
Mulvey Crescent, Airdrie War Memorial				55°51′50″N 3°59′45″W	Category C(S)	48554	Upload another image
80-82 (Even Nos), 86 South Bridge Street And 4 Anderson Street				55°52′01″N 3°58′53″W	Category C(S)	48558	Upload Photo
Hallcraig Street, St Margaret's Roman Catholic Church Including Presbytery And Boundary Wall				55°52′04″N 3°58′32″W	Category B	20924	Upload Photo
Airdrie Road, Clarkston Parish Church, Church Of Scotland				55°52′22″N 3°56′44″W	Category C(S)	20925	Upload Photo
Stirling Street, Sir John Wilson Town Hall Including Gatepiers				55°51′56″N 3°59′01″W	Category B	20947	Upload another image
Wellwynd, Airdrie Public Library				55°51′59″N 3°58′59″W	Category C(S)	20950	Upload Photo
31 Victoria Place, Flowerhill Manse Including Boundary Wall And Gatepiers				55°51′46″N 3°59′04″W	Category C(S)	48562	Upload Photo
Bell Street, Methodist Church				55°52′00″N 3°59′06″W	Category B	20922	Upload Photo
Arran Drive, Commonhead, Street, Arranview Including Gatepiers				55°52′23″N 3°59′16″W	Category B	20928	Upload Photo
Motherwell Street, Rawyards House				55°52′28″N 3°57′47″W	Category C(S)	20933	Upload Photo
Bank Street, Former Royal Bank Of Scotland				55°52′00″N 3°58′50″W	Category B	20937	Upload another image
77-83 (Odd Nos) High Street				55°52′04″N 3°59′07″W	Category C(S)	20942	Upload Photo
Coatdyke, Centenary Avenue, Railway Viaduct				55°51′49″N 4°00′09″W	Category B	49409	Upload Photo
93, 95 High Street, Charlie's Bar				55°52′03″N 3°59′08″W	Category C(S)	20934	Upload Photo
35 Quarry Road Including Boundary Wall				55°52′20″N 3°58′54″W	Category C(S)	20946	Upload Photo
12-20 (Even Nos) Bank Street				55°52′01″N 3°58′51″W	Category C(S)	48543	Upload Photo
40 South Bridge Street				55°52′04″N 3°58′56″W	Category C(S)	48557	Upload Photo
Anderson Street, Airdrie Arts Centre				55°52′00″N 3°58′54″W	Category B	20935	Upload Photo
Chapel Street, Educational Resource Centre, Formerly Chapelside Primary School, Including Boundary Walls, Gatepiers, Gates And Railings				55°52′17″N 3°58′35″W	Category B	20939	Upload Photo
7 Graham Street				55°51′59″N 3°58′47″W	Category C(S)	20941	Upload Photo
11-13 (Odd Nos) Stirling Street				55°51′57″N 3°58′53″W	Category B	20948	Upload Photo
Broomknoll Street, Ebenezer Congregational Chapel				55°51′56″N 3°58′49″W	Category C(S)	48545	Upload Photo
8-16 (Even Nos) Broomknoll Street				55°51′55″N 3°58′51″W	Category C(S)	48546	Upload Photo
18 And 20 Broomknoll Street				55°51′55″N 3°58′51″W	Category C(S)	48547	Upload Photo
26 (Upper And Lower Flat) Victoria Place, Dalmagarry And Cairnbaan Including Boundary Wall And Gatepiers				55°51′46″N 3°59′13″W	Category C(S)	48561	Upload Photo

== Key ==
The scheme for classifying buildings in Scotland is:

- Category A: "buildings of national or international importance, either architectural or historic; or fine, little-altered examples of some particular period, style or building type."
- Category B: "buildings of regional or more than local importance; or major examples of some particular period, style or building type, which may have been altered."
- Category C: "buildings of local importance; lesser examples of any period, style, or building type, as originally constructed or moderately altered; and simple traditional buildings which group well with other listed buildings."

In March 2016 there were 47,288 listed buildings in Scotland. Of these, 8% were Category A, and 50% were Category B, with the remaining 42% being Category C.

== See also ==
- List of listed buildings in North Lanarkshire
