= Stanrigg mining accident =

1918 coal mining accident in Scotland

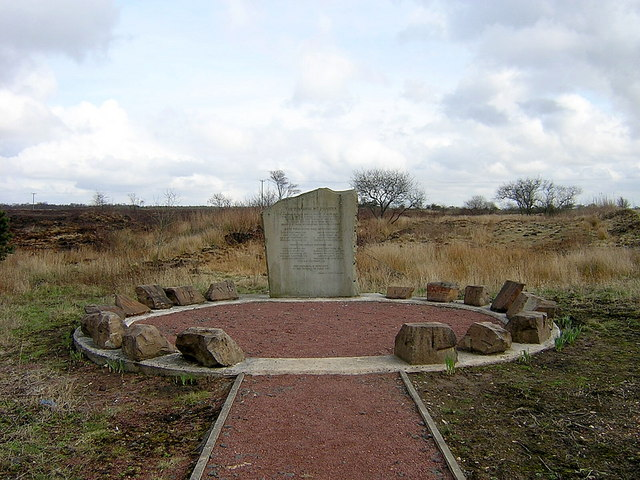
- The Stanrigg Memorial in 2006
- Date: July 9, 1918
- Location: near Airdrie, Scotland; 55.8922048°N 3.9274442°W
- Also known as: Stanrigg Pit disaster, Arbuckle Pit disaster
- Type: Mining accident
- Cause: Subsidence
- Deaths: 19

The Stanrigg mining accident, also known as the Stanrigg Pit disaster or the Arbuckle Pit disaster, was a coal mining accident which occurred on 9 July 1918 at the Arbuckle Pit of Stanrigg Colliery near the town of Airdrie in what is now North Lanarkshire, Scotland.

Nineteen miners died including six teenage boys. Eleven bodies were never recovered and remain entombed at the site. The cause was subsidence of the overlying peat bog or moss in local parlance.

A memorial monument now stands close to the site of the mine, or pit, which lies about 1 km north of the village of Plains, and 2.5 km south-east of the villages of Wattston and Greengairs.

== Accident ==
Between 10:00 and 10:30 on Tuesday July 9, firemen at the surface were alerted by a mineworker who had surfaced to report that he suspected a serious problem based on an excess of ventilating air through the tunnels. The firemen descended at once but were soon met by liquid flowing in multiple places. The alarm was raised and 58 miners were able to escape the inrush and safely reach the surface. But nineteen who were working the 'humph' seam were cut off by the flooding of the workings.

Rescue attempts began immediately by various means but all failed. The next day, Wednesday, a bore was able to piece the tunnel in the affected section but it was found to have water to the depth of over 6 feet with the presence of black damp. By Thursday evening, more than 48 hours after the accident, other borings had confirmed the depth of water and hope was lost. Throughout this time, subsidence was on-going, endangering those involved in the rescue effort.

Recovery work continued at the site and by the end of September, eight bodies of the nineteen who had perished had been recovered.

== Aftermath and impact ==
A lengthy newspaper report in the local weekly, the Airdrie & Coatbridge Advertiser, from July 13 - the Saturday following the accident - provided details of those killed, the accident's impact on the surrounding communities and the anguishing scenes in the immediate aftermath.

The dead miners were from various villages surrounding the colliery with almost half from the neighbouring villages of Greengairs and Wattston. They ranged in age from 14 to 59. Three of the dead were brothers and three of those made widows were sisters. There were two fathers and their sons. Six of those lost were boys aged from 14 to 17, the youngest having only worked in the mine for three days while his father fought in France.

this ... will long be remembered as the saddest in the history of the district. Crowds of sympathetic men and women gathered daily round the pit head, and the sympathy felt for the anxious relatives broke out time and time again.

One of the surviving miners, John McCabe, age 17 of Longriggend, was awarded the Edward Medal, later exchanged for a George Cross, for his actions in alerting other miners to the danger. He is credited with saving 58 lives.

== Investigation ==
On 25 July 1918, James Duncan Millar, the local Member of Parliament for the constituency of North East Lanarkshire, raised a question about the accident in the House of Commons. William Brace, the Under Secretary of State for the Home Department, responded that the government would hold a special inquiry under the Coal Mines Act into the circumstances of the accident.

The subsequent report, published 12th March 1919, concluded that there was no contravention of the act. But it also called for more regulation regarding mining under "moss, quicksand, or other liquid matter".

== Memorials ==
Reverse side of the main stone monument at the Stanrigg Memorial

In 1997, almost eighty years after the event, the graves of the entombed miners remained unmarked and no memorials had been erected, though lately there was a campaign to have a memorial installed at the site and a stone work had been commissioned. Since then, the Stanrigg Memorial was established about 100m from the accident site. This consists of a tree lined pathway leading to a circular arrangement of stones: a large standing stone with inscriptions on one side and artwork on the other; and nineteen small irregular stones representing the deceased miners.

On the centenary of the accident in 2018, around 100 people attended a commemoration event held at the memorial site which included the laying of wreaths, speeches by local dignitaries and a two minute silence. During the service, Rev Alan A Ford, minister of New Monkland and Greengairs Parish Church, consecrated the ground of the pit to preserve the area from to future disturbance.

In 2019 a renovated recreation area in Plains was designated Stanrigg Park. There is also Stanrigg Memorial Park in Wattston.
