= Plains, North Lanarkshire =

Coordinates: 55.881°N 3.931°W

Plains: Scottish Gaelic: Na Machraichean
- Location within North Lanarkshire
- Population: 2,920 (2020)
- OS grid reference: NS798699
- Council area: North Lanarkshire
- Lieutenancy area: Lanarkshire
- Country: Scotland
- Sovereign state: United Kingdom
- Post town: AIRDRIE
- Postcode district: ML6
- Dialling code: 01236
- Police: Scotland
- Fire: Scottish
- Ambulance: Scottish
- UK Parliament: Airdrie and Shotts
- Scottish Parliament: Airdrie and Shotts

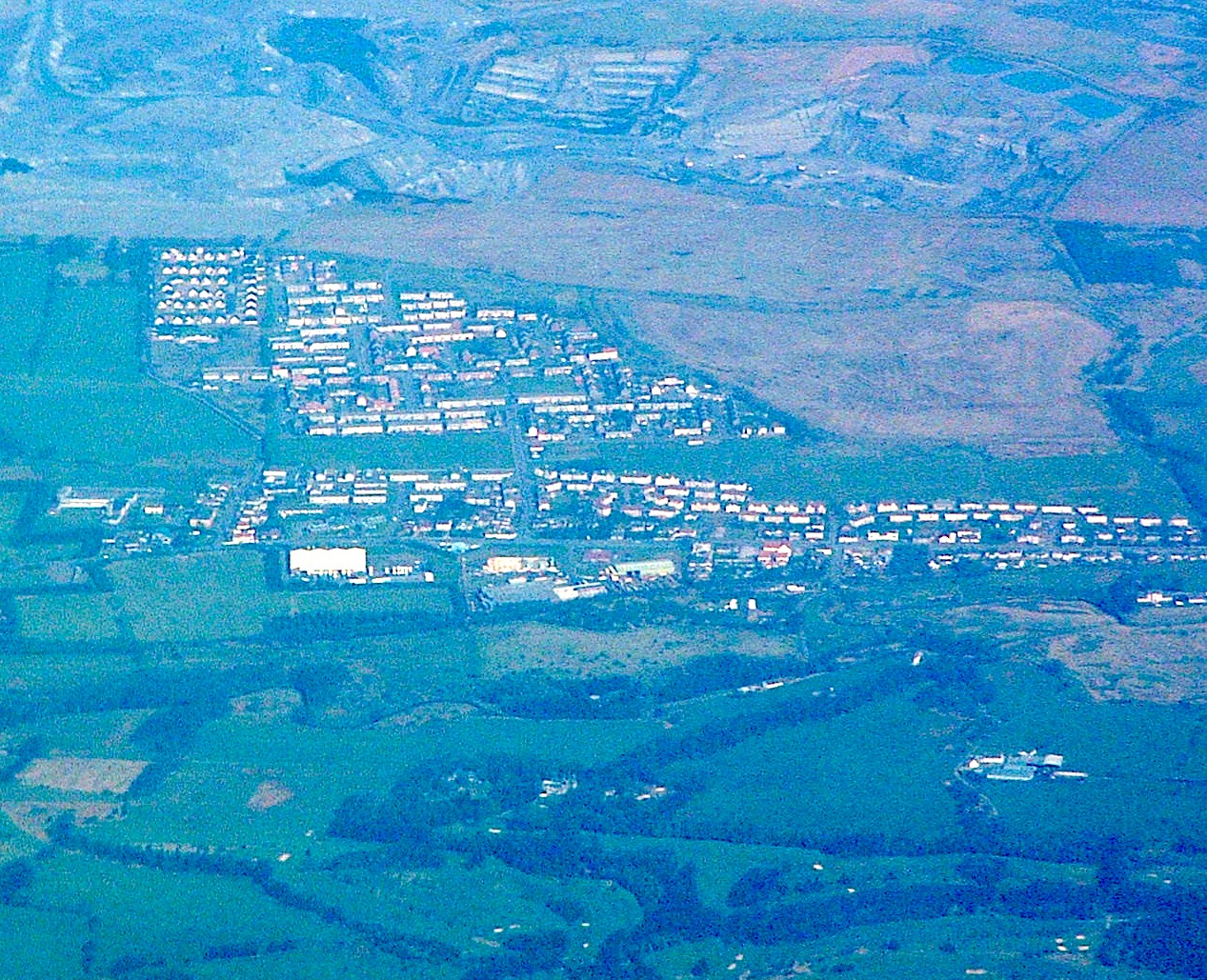
Aerial photograph of Plains (2003)

Plains /ˈpleɪnz/ is a village outside the town of Airdrie, in North Lanarkshire, Scotland, about 14 miles (23 kilometres) east of Glasgow city centre and 32 miles (51 km) west of Edinburgh. The nearest major towns are Airdrie (2 1/2 mi or 4 km) and Coatbridge (5 mi or 8 km). The village is west of Caldercruix and the North Calder Water. The population is about 2,740.

== Etymology ==
The origin of the name "Plains" is unknown. One suggestion is that the name derives (via the plural of Plain) from the view afforded to the Cistercian Monks of Newbattle Abbey as they travelled to what is now the site of the village. These monks farmed the wider area for grain in what became known as Monklands. But the geography of the area runs contrary to this idea. Alternatively, the name may be a contraction of "The Plains of Waterloo" – a name given by a returning soldier from the Napoleonic Wars. Either way, it is not uncommon for locals to refer to the village as "The Plains".

== Geography ==
Plains is situated on the gentle south-facing slope of the valley of the North Calder Water, which is a tributary of the River Clyde. To the north of the settlement runs a series of unclassified roads known to older residents as The Backies. Opencast mining in the 1970s and 1980s took away much of the natural beauty within this network of roads which since has further been eroded with the advent of a landfill site.

The Main Street (the A89) runs in a straight line for about one mile (1.5 kilometres) east to west. Almost all of the residential housing of the village lies on the northern side of Main St., forming a roughly square shape (1 mile each side). To the south of Main St., the valley drops more steeply down to the North Calder, then steeply up the other side, which is home to the parkland Easter Moffat golf course.

Plains lie at around 500 ft (150 m) above sea level. From the nearby Airdriehill Farm, there is a wide vista to the west across the urbanised lower Clyde valley. Beyond, on a clear day, it is possible to see Ben Lomond and the Isle of Arran.

To the southeast of Plains, the land rises to almost 1,000 ft (300 m) – the highest land in the narrow isthmus across central Scotland spanning the Scottish watershed. Consequently, the area was chosen as the location for Scotland's first television transmitting stations. The Black Hill Transmitter, at 306.6 m (1,006 ft) tall, is a very prominent local landmark. It began broadcasting independent Scottish Television services in August 1957. Nearby, but not so tall or prominent, is Kirk o'Shotts transmitter mast, which broadcast Scotland's first BBC television signals in March 1952. There is now a second transmitter (completed 2009) which will replace the older one, which itself will be relocated within the Scottish transmitting network.

== History ==
The village was founded in the mid-19th century along what is now the A89 Airdrie to Bathgate road. The population of the village in 1860 is recorded at just over 200. Much of the original growth of the village was in keeping with the expansion of the coal mining industry in North Lanarkshire, most notably the Ardenrigg Coal Co Ltd. This coal mining activity dwindled in the second half of the 20th century. However, Scotland's largest opencast coal mine is currently in operation at Drumshangie Moss, a few miles northwest of Plains. There has been controversy regarding the impact of this mine on the site of the Stanrigg Mining Disaster where, in July 1918, a collapse led to the deaths of 19 local mine workers.

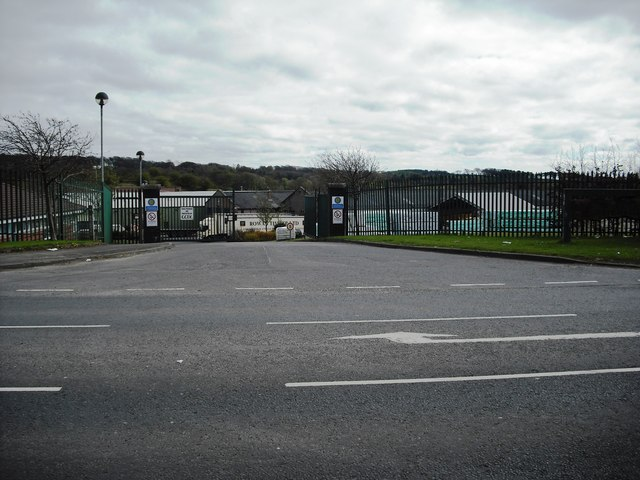
Timber supplier's yard

Late 20th century expansion of the village has been to the north of the A89 road in separate developments of local government or Council houses, consisting of blocks of terraced houses. Originally planned as affordable, rented accommodations for the predominantly working class population, a large percentage have become owner occupied in recent years. At the beginning of the 21st century, a new development of relatively large, detached houses were established in the northeast corner of the village.

There is no significant single employer within the village. During the last decades of the 20th century, the main employers were the Geest Company and Beechams.

Geest occupied a site in the middle of the village, south towards the railway, and was involved in the receipt and packaging of fruit for distribution throughout the country. The site is now occupied by Donaldson Door Systems who are part of the Donaldson Group, the largest timber product manufacturer in the UK.

The Beecham site was a warehouse and distribution facility employing a number of local drivers and located adjacent to Geest Bananas. The warehouse was recently demolished and the site is to be developed for additional housing.

== Plains today ==
Today, Plains is a largely working class settlement with local people commuting for employment throughout urban central Scotland. There have been recent housing developments that have expanded the village. These tend to be more up-market dwellings, and are more modern than the council houses which predominate in the village. There has been a new swing park added to Plains and a post office was opened in 2016. A campaign to bring a railway station has not yet been successful. Plains has an active Community Council.

=== Organised religion ===
Christian worship takes place at the Elim Gospel Hall and at Plains Evangelical Church. What is now Plains Evangelical Church, a thriving non-denominational independent church, was begun by Mr Robert McCracken in 1900.

St David's Catholic church remains open for worship.

=== Education ===
There are two state schools: St David's Primary and Plains Primary. Both schools are accommodated in a shared campus built on the former football pitches on the west side of Bruce Street. These football pitches were the former site of pit bings which were only removed as the result of community pressure in the 1960s.

== Points of interest ==
National Cycle Route 75, a Sustrans long-distance cycle path, ran parallel and around 100 metres (110 yd) south of Main Street. This was constructed along the bed of a former North British Railway line that previously had linked Glasgow and Edinburgh. On 10 May 2007, the bill allowing this line to be re-established as a commuter railway was passed by the Scottish Parliament. The line was opened in December 2010. In addition to the re-opening of this 'missing link' between Glasgow and Edinburgh, the existing line between Bathgate and Edinburgh was electrified.

As a result of the re-establishment of the railway line, the Sustrans cycle path now stops before reaching Plains on the west side and restarts at the east end of Plains Main Street.

In the mid to late 20th century, Plains Countryside Park was the site of the annual Plains Summer Gala – a day of parades, children's sports events and entertainment – one of a tradition typical of villages in the area including Harthill, Whitburn and Armadale. Although around nineteen years since the Plains Summer Gala was last held, a new committee formed and resurrected this tradition in 2012. The Gala included a lively procession around the village and games and stalls on the play parks in the middle of the village.
