= John Armstrong (footballer, born 1936) =

Scottish footballer

Personal information
- Full name: John Armstrong
- Date of birth: 5 September 1936 (age 90)
- Place of birth: Airdrie, Scotland
- Position: Goalkeeper

Youth career
- Bellshill Athletic

Senior career*
Years	Team	Apps	(Gls)
1958–1958	Barrow	21	(0)
1958–1963	Nottingham Forest	20	(0)
1963–1967	Portsmouth	79	(0)
1967–1971	Southport	86	(0)
Total		206	(0)
- * Club domestic league appearances and goals

John Armstrong (born 5 September 1936) is a Scottish former professional footballer, who played as a goalkeeper. He played for Barrow, Nottingham Forest, Portsmouth and Southport.

== Playing career ==
Born in Airdrie, Armstrong joined Barrow from Bellshill Athletic in March 1958. He joined Nottingham Forest nine months later, but could not establish himself in the first team. Portsmouth stepped in and signed him for about £6,000 in February 1963. He joined Southport in 1967.
