= Greengairs =

Coordinates: 55.913978°N 3.941800°W

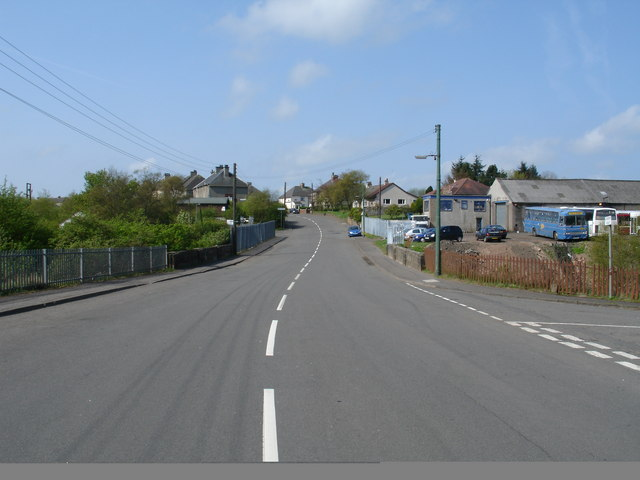
- Road through Greengairs

- Location within North Lanarkshire
- Population: 520 (2020)
- Council area: North Lanarkshire
- Country: Scotland
- Sovereign state: United Kingdom
- Post town: AIRDRIE
- Postcode district: ML6
- Dialling code: 01236
- Police: Scotland
- Fire: Scottish
- Ambulance: Scottish

Greengairs is a village in North Lanarkshire, Scotland. Greengairs is shown on a map by Roy c.1754 under the name of Green Geirs. In toponymy, the name means "green strips of grass". Lying 3 miles (5 km) southeast of Cumbernauld and 3 miles (5 km) north east of Airdrie, the village consists mainly of local authority housing. Between them Greengairs and Wattston have about 1,190 residents.

It developed in the nineteenth century due to increased coal mining and quarrying. Ironstone was first mined by the Summerlee Iron Company in the 1840s. It was in the parish of New Monkland or East Monkland. It also historically had its own school; the teachers had a house but no salary. The village was badly affected by the Stanrigg Mining Disaster where, in July 1918, a collapse led to the deaths of 19 miners, 6 of whom came from Greengairs.

Greengairs power station opened in 1996, and is powered by methane produced by biodegrading materials from a large landfill site developed since 1990 in former open cast workings situated to the south of the village. Greengairs is the largest landfill site in Scotland, handling waste from Glasgow and Edinburgh. Greengairs has 6000m of pipes with biogas fed by 90 gas wells.
