= Stand, North Lanarkshire =

Hamlet in North Lanarkshire, Scotland, UK

Coordinates: 55.889120°N 3.984194°W

Stand is a hamlet in North Lanarkshire, Scotland situated on the A73 near Airdrie. Its Ordnance Survey grid reference is NS7668.

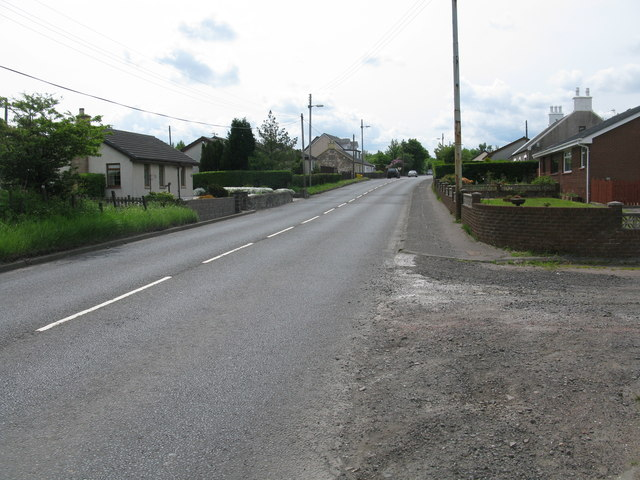
Stand, North Lanarkshire

The village appeared on a map by Timothy Pont, published in 1596. It is near the top right of the map near the Black Loch.

Stand is also shown on another map by Roy c1754. The etymology of the name is uncertain although a horse stop or stabling point has been suggested. It is between the Fleming estates at Biggar and Cumbernauld.

== Facilities ==
There is a bed and breakfast in Stand. For more facilities, residents can travel to nearby towns such as Airdrie, Coatbridge and Cumbernauld, along with the nearby cities of Glasgow and Stirling.

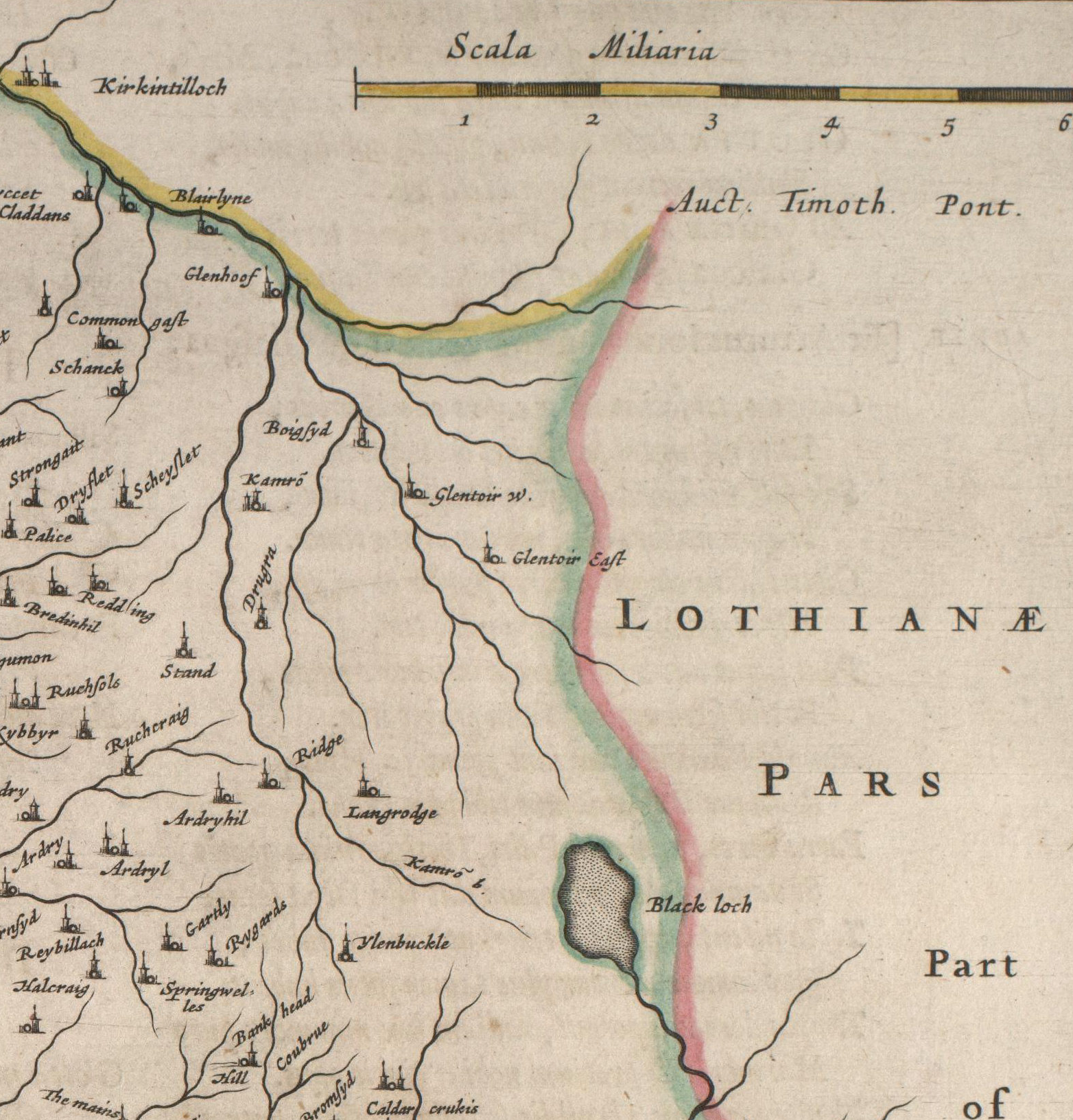
Stand from Blaeu's Map based on Pont's
