= Bobby Jeffrey =

Scottish footballer

Personal information
- Date of birth: 7 November 1942 (age 83)
- Place of birth: Airdrie, Scotland
- Position: Left winger

Youth career
- Coltness United

Senior career*
Years	Team	Apps	(Gls)
1962–1963	Celtic	5	(1)
1963–1964	Airdrie	9	(1)
- Rhyl
- Altrincham
- Pwllheli
- Colwyn Bay
- Cambridge City
1966–1967	Stranraer	17	(5)
Total		31	(7)
- * Club domestic league appearances and goals

Bobby Jeffrey (born 7 November 1942) is a Scottish former professional footballer who played as a left winger

== Career ==
Born in Airdrie, Jeffrey played for Coltness United, Celtic, Airdrie, Rhyl, Altrincham, Pwllheli, Colwyn Bay, Cambridge City and Stranraer.
