= Riggend =

Hamlet in North Lanarkshire, Scotland

Coordinates: 55.909°N 3.978°W

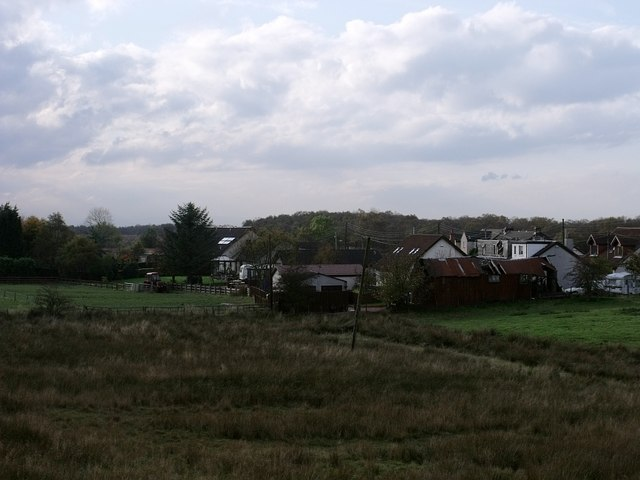
Riggend from Old Biggar Road

Riggend is a hamlet in North Lanarkshire, Scotland. It is on the A73 Stirling Road not far from Wattston.
