= Public observatory =

Astronomical observatory

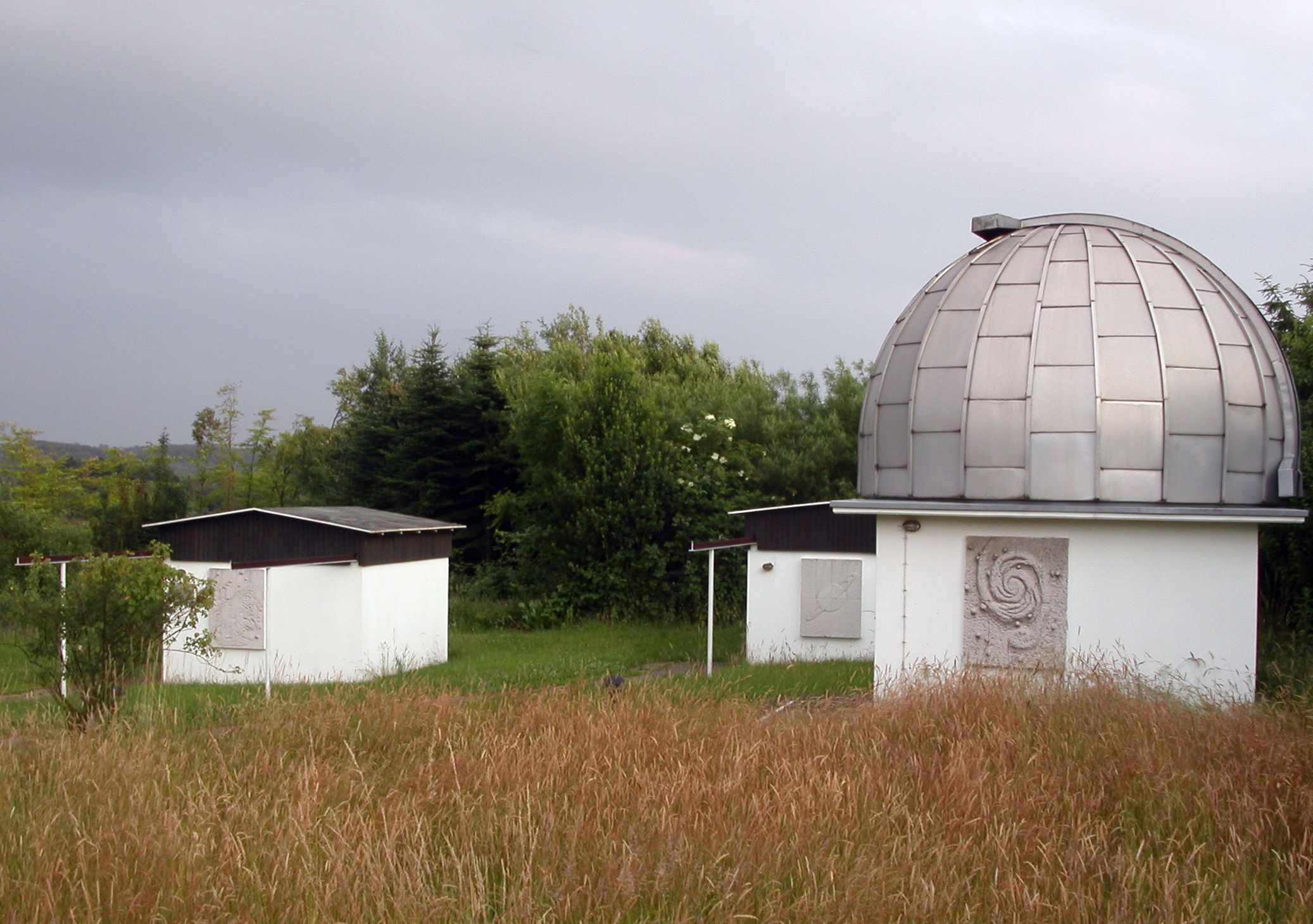
A public observatory near Essen, Germany that is also used for research

A public observatory is an astronomical observatory mainly dedicated to public and educational purposes. It is often supported by a municipality, a school or an astronomical society.

The primary purpose of public observatories is to offer extensive programs for public education in astronomy. A second purpose may be to serve as a center for local hobby astronomers or for interested astro-tourists. Some sites are also engaged in special research programs (e.g., programs focused on meteors or asteroids).

Public observatories are equipped with several optical telescopes that are housed within a dome or similar structure to protect the instruments from the elements. The domes have a slit in the roof that can be opened during observing and closed when the observatory is not in use. Additional equipment may include astronomical clocks, star maps, PCs, digital projectors, and educational material.

== United Kingdom ==
Mills Observatory in Dundee was the first purpose-built public astronomical observatory in the UK. There are only four public observatories in total the United Kingdom, another of which is Airdrie Observatory in Scotland.

== See also ==
- List of observatories

== Literature ==
- H. Bernhard, D. Bennett, H. Rice, 1948: Handbook of the Heavens, Chapters 20-21, McGraw-Hill, New York
- Detlev Block: Astronomie als Hobby, 208 S. Bassermann, München 2006
