= Airdrie Town House =

Municipal Building in Airdrie, Scotland

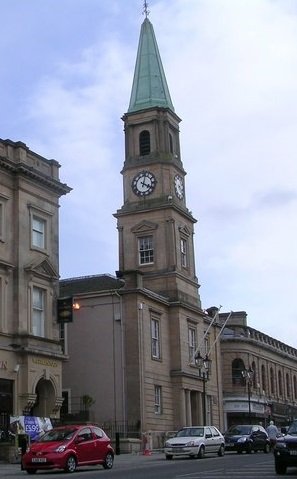
- Airdrie Town House

- Shown in North Lanarkshire
- 55.8666°N 3.9807°W
- Location: Bank Street, Airdrie

History
- Built: 1826

Site notes
- Architect: Alexander Baird
- Architectural style: Neoclassical style

Listed Building – Category B
- Official name: Bank Street, The Townhouse
- Designated: 4 March 1971
- Reference no.: LB20926

Airdie Town House is a municipal building in Bank Street, Airdrie, North Lanarkshire, Scotland. The town house, which was the headquarters of Airdrie Burgh Council, is a Category B listed building.

== History ==
In the early 19th century the burgh leaders met in the masonic hall, a building in the High Street, which had opened on 11 May 1810. The masonic lodge had over-extended itself with the borrowings needed to build the hall and was keen to maximise use of the building. After the area became of burgh of barony in 1821, the burgh leaders decided to commission a dedicated municipal building for the town.

The new town house was designed by Alexander Baird in the neoclassical style, built in ashlar stone and completed in December 1826. The design involved a symmetrical main frontage with three bays facing onto Bank Street; the centre bay, which was slightly projected forward, featured a doorway on the ground floor flanked by two pairs of Tuscan order columns supporting an entablature and a small canopy; there was a sash window on the first floor. There was a tower above with a pedimented sash window in the next stage, followed by a clock, a belfry and then a spire. When completed it was 30.8 metres (101 ft) high. Internally, the principal rooms were the courtroom and the police station.

A bell was cast by Stephen Miller & Co of Glasgow and installed in the belfry in 1828, and the building went on to serve as a hospital during the cholera outbreak in 1832. The first free library in Scotland was established in one of the rooms in the building in 1854. However, the police station relocated to Anderson Street in 1858 and the library relocated to a purpose-built Carnegie library in Anderson Street in 1894. (Note: The Carnegie Library is now the Airdrie Arts Centre.)

The town house had no public hall so public events had to be held in the Airdrie Town Hall which was only completed in 1912. The building was considerably extended to the rear in 1948, allowing the interior to be remodelled with a larger courtroom, which was also used as a council chamber, on the first floor.

The building continued to serve as the headquarters of Airdrie Burgh Council for much of the 20th century but ceased to be the local seat of government after the enlarged Monklands District Council was formed at Coatbridge in 1975. The building was subsequently used as the local First Stop Shop, although the council announced the closure of the One Stop Shop in June 2020.

== See also ==
- List of listed buildings in Airdrie, North Lanarkshire
