= Wattston =

Coordinates: 55°54′28″N 3°57′30″W

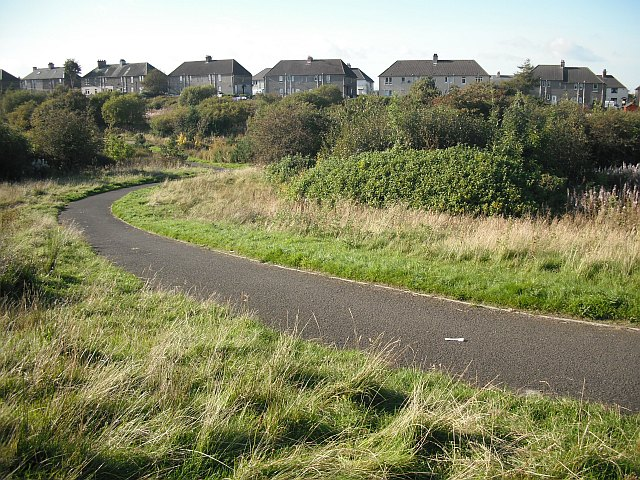
- Wattston from Stanrigg Memorial Park

- Location within North Lanarkshire
- Population: 560 (2020)
- Council area: North Lanarkshire
- Country: Scotland
- Sovereign state: United Kingdom
- Police: Scotland
- Fire: Scottish
- Ambulance: Scottish

Wattston is a village on the B803, west of Greengairs in North Lanarkshire, Scotland. Between them Wattston and Greengairs have about 1,190 residents. It is around 4 km south of Cumbernauld, and 4 km north of Airdrie. Other places nearby include Caldercruix, Longriggend, Riggend and Slamannan.

There is still open cast mining in this former mining village. The village was badly affected by the Stanrigg Mining Disaster where, in July 1918, a collapse led to the deaths of 19 local mine workers, 3 of whom were from Wattston and 6 others from nearby Greengairs.

The 98th corps of the Lanarkshire Rifle Volunteers was headquartered at Wattston.

== See also ==
- List of places in North Lanarkshire
- List of places in Scotland
