= Airdrie, North Lanarkshire =

Town in North Lanarkshire, Scotland

Coordinates: 55.86°N 3.98°W

Airdrie: Scottish Gaelic: An t-Àrd Ruigh; Scots: Airdrie
- Town
- Airdrie town centre

- Location within North Lanarkshire
- Population: 35,846 (2022)
- OS grid reference: NS761654
- Council area: North Lanarkshire
- Lieutenancy area: Lanarkshire
- Country: Scotland
- Sovereign state: United Kingdom
- Post town: Airdrie
- Postcode district: ML6
- Dialling code: 01236
- Police: Scotland
- Fire: Scottish
- Ambulance: Scottish
- UK Parliament: Airdrie and Shotts
- Scottish Parliament: Airdrie

Airdrie (/ˈɛərdri/; Scots: Airdrie; Scottish Gaelic: An t-Àrd Ruigh) is a town in North Lanarkshire, Scotland. It lies on a plateau 400 ft (130 m) above sea level, 12 miles (19 km) east of Glasgow. In 2022, The town had a population of 35,846.

Airdrie developed as a market town in the late 17th century following the passing of an act of Parliament, the Airdrie Fairs and Market Act 1695 (c. 94 (S)) allowing it to hold a weekly market. It later grew in prominence as a centre for weaving and manufacturing, as well as being the settlement near several coalmines. In the mid 19th century, the town expanded greatly as a result of immigration and the development of iron works and railway links. The first public library in Scotland was established in Airdrie in 1853.

During the 20th century, industrial decline took place in Airdrie, with heavy industry closing down across much of the town. In the 21st century, Airdrie has continued as a regional centre for services and retail, as well as being a commuter settlement within the Central Belt. Historically part of Lanarkshire, Airdrie forms a conurbation with its neighbour Coatbridge, in what was formerly the Monklands district, with a population of approximately 90,000.

== Name ==
Airdrie's name first appeared in the Register of the Great Seal of Scotland (Latin: Registrum Magni Sigilii Regum Scotorum) in 1373 as 'Ardre'. By 1546 it had become 'Ardry' and by 1587 it was known as 'Ardrie'. In 1630 it finally appeared in the Register as 'Airdrie'. Given the topography of the area, the most likely interpretation is that the name derives from the Gaelic An Àrd Ruigh meaning 'a level height' or 'high pasture land'. Another possibility is from the Gaelic An Àrd Àirighe meaning 'a sheiling, a summer pasture/shepherd's hut'. A third possibility is the Gaelic Ard Reidh meaning 'a high plain'. A less likely, non-Gaelic alternative, is the Brythonic, i.e. Cumbric or North Welsh, ard tref (becoming ardre by process of assimilation), meaning 'a high steading or farmstead', which would date back to the times of the Kingdom of Strathclyde, before the expansion of Gaelic or English speech into the region. Airthrey Castle in Stirlingshire may have a similar derivation.

== History ==
=== Early history ===
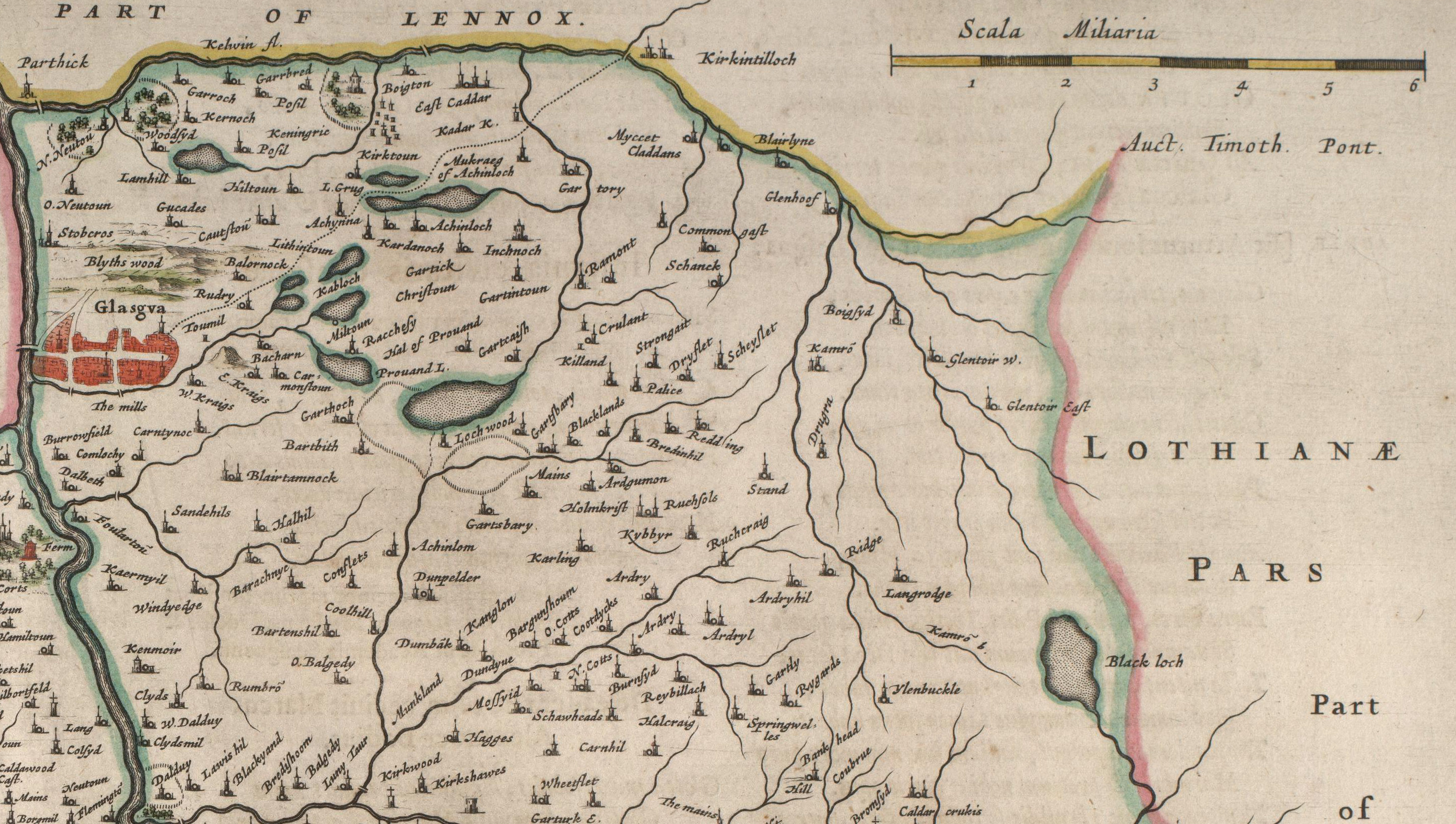
Blaeu's map based on Pont's original "Glasgow and the county of Lanark" map c.1596 depicting Ardry (Airdrie), Burnsyd (Burnfoot), Carnhil (Cairnhill), Gartly (Gartlea), and Ruchsols (Rochsoles) amongst others.

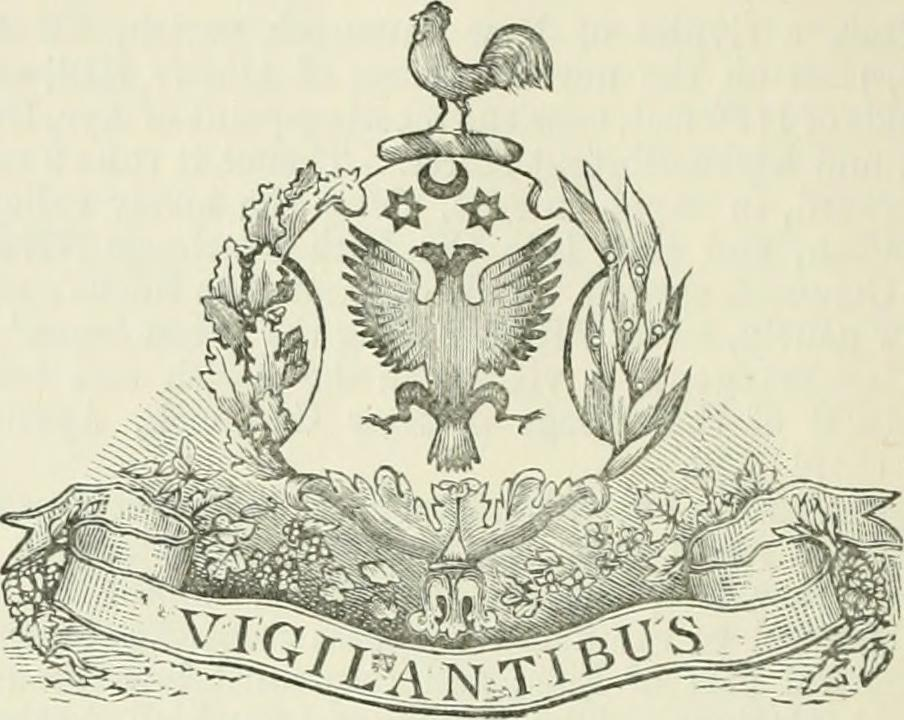
Arms of Airdrie - The town's motto is the Latin word Vigilantibus (Being Watchful). It comes from Aitcheson of Rochsolloch

There is no evidence to support the claim (George Chalmers, Caledonia) that Airdrie is the site of the ancient battle of Arderyth. Under the patronage of King Malcolm IV of Scotland Cistercian monks established an abbey at Melrose in 1136. Five years later a daughter house was founded at Newbattle Abbey in Lothian. In 1160, Malcolm granted lands in central Scotland to the monks of Newbattle. These became known as the "Munklands" (Register of the Great Seal 1323).

Malcolm's Charter constitutes the oldest documentary record of place-names in the Monklands. The area of land granted by the Charter is clearly defined by direct reference to geographical and topographical features thus: Dunpeldre by its right boundaries, namely with Metheraugh and Mayeuth and Clarnephin as far as Dunduffes in the east. The name Dunpeldre is found in the modern name Drumpellier, Metheraugh is Medrox; Mayeuth is Myvot and Clarnephin refers to the North Calder Water in the east of the parish (from old Brittonic name claur n afon meaning plain of the river). Dunduffes has become directly translated into the modern Black Hill which, as the Charter states, lies at the eastern extremity of the parish. The Charter does not mention anything resembling Airdrie, although this is where Airdrie is located.

Airdrie owes its existence to its location on the 'Hogs Back' – a ridge of land running from east to west. One very important aspect of the town's history was the Cistercian monks of Newbattle Abbey, which is why the area is called the Monklands. The monks were farmers and some of their place names survive, e.g., Ryefield and Whifflet (the wheat flats). Much of the land they used is known today as 'The Four Isles' (a housing estate named after four Scottish islands): Mull, Islay, Iona and Luing in the Petersburn area of modern Airdrie. The monks of Newbattle had numerous establishments throughout the area including a farm grange at Drumpellier, Coatbridge, a court house at Kipps, a chapel in the area of Chapelhall and a number of corn mills. The monks were also expert in the construction of roads. In the 12th century, they established the original Glasgow to Edinburgh road via Airdrie and Bathgate, to link up with their lands in Newbattle in East Lothian.

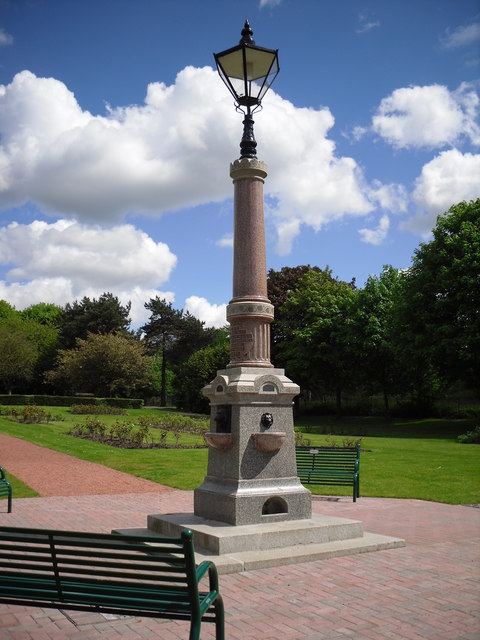
The Robert Hamilton Memorial

Definitive evidence of the existence of Airdrie as a tenantry was only made clear in 1503. The old monks' road was via Cliftonhill (an area now in neighbouring Coatbridge), Airdrie House (now the site of Monklands Hospital), Aitchison Street, High Street, Hallcraig Street, Flowerhill Street and Colliertree Road. The first houses in Airdrie were built along this road. Development was slow and it was only around 1650 that evidence of the number of inhabitants was known at around 500 for the Airdrie area. A large contingent of Airdrieonians fought at the Battle of Bothwell Brig during the Covenanter Rebellion of 1679; their banner can still be viewed at the local library.

Airdrie Fairs and Market Act 1695
- Act of Parliament
- Parliament of Scotland
- Long title: Act in favours of Robert Hamilton of Airdry for four yearly fairs & a weekly Mercat at the toun of Airdry.
- Citation: 1695 c. 94 (S)

Dates
- Royal assent: 17 July 1695

A significant event in Airdrie's history was the 1695 passing of a special act of Parliament, the Airdrie Fairs and Market Act 1695 (c. 94 (S)) in the Scottish Parliament allowing Robert Hamilton of Airdrie to hold four fairs yearly and a weekly market in the town of 'Airdry'. This helped develop Airdrie from a 'farm town' into a thriving 'market town'.

However, Airdrie really came to prominence through its weaving industry. Airdrie Weavers Society was founded in 1781 and flax was being grown in sixteen farms in and around the burgh. In the last decade of the eighteenth century, coal mining was in progress and around thirty colliers were employed. Weaving continued to flourish making up a substantial part of the population of over 2,500 around the turn of the 19th century.

Airdrie Improvement Act 1821
- Act of Parliament
- Parliament of the United Kingdom
- Long title: An Act for erecting the Town of Airdrie, in the County of Lanark, into a Burgh of Barony, paving, lighting and improving the same, and establishing a Police therein.
- Citation: 1 & 2 Geo. 4. c. lx

Dates
- Royal assent: 28 May 1821
Other legislation
Repealed by	Airdrie Corporation Order Confirmation Act 1951

Status: Repealed

Text of statute as originally enacted

Given its large number of weavers, its geographic location and a large number of unemployed soldiers following the end of the Napoleonic Wars, Airdrie became a major centre of support for the Radical War of 1820. The rapid pace of population growth continued and by 1821 there were 4,862 inhabitants. At this time, the number of houses being built increased dramatically and in 1821, by a local act of Parliament, the Airdrie Improvement Act 1821 (1 & 2 Geo. 4. c. lx), Airdrie became a free and independent burgh of barony.

In 1821, the first election of a town council took place and by August it had appointed an assessor, procurator fiscal, master of police and a town crier. Anyone who had paid their 3 guineas was allowed to vote; there is even a record of a John Mackay voting despite being under 10 years old.

In 1824, it was decided to build the Airdrie Town House, originally designed by Alexander Baird and now a local landmark known as the 'town clock'. In 1832, the Town House was used as a hospital due to the cholera outbreak of this year.

=== 1850 to 1920 ===
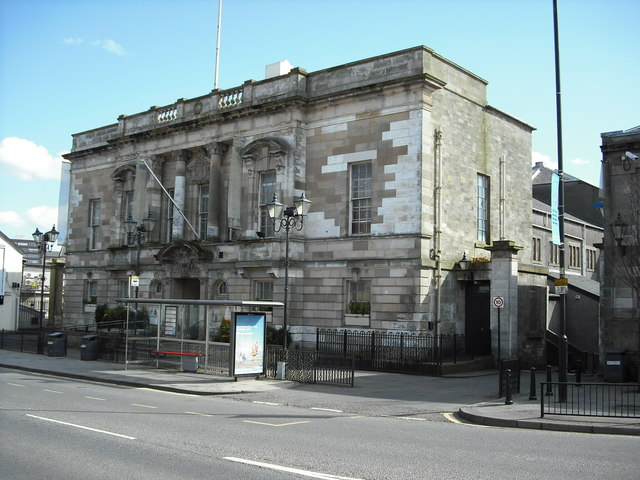
Sir John Wilson Town Hall

The enormous growth in population was not due to high birthrate, but instead due to an influx of residents from the Highlands and predominantly Ireland. This followed the Highland potato famine of the mid-1840s and also reflected the change from cottage industry to heavy industry in the area. Most of the Irish immigrant population were involved with mining and labouring. This led to an increase in ironwork foundries around the area. Because of this explosion in industry, railway links were established starting in 1826. By 1862, the Airdrie and Bathgate Junction Railway provided a direct link to Edinburgh with Airdrie South Station providing the starting point for trains to Glasgow.

In August the Public Libraries Act (Scotland) 1853 was passed, and in November Airdrie Public Library became the first in Scotland.

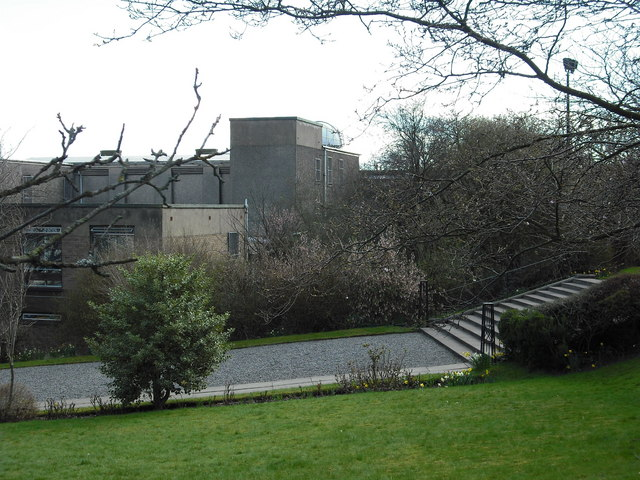
Rear of Airdrie library with Observatory Dome

The dramatic rise in population and industry prompted the need for more accessible water supplies. Until the mid-1800s, various wells were put in place feeding from surrounding streams in the area. These served to provide many houses with private wells. By 1846 Airdrie and Coatbridge Water Company was founded to construct (along with Forth and Clyde Canal Company) the reservoir at Roughrigg.

Journalism in Airdrie began with "The Airdrie Literary Album" in 1828. Several local newspapers began appearing around this time notably the Airdrie & Coatbridge Advertiser in 1855, which is still the most popular local paper today. The prison was legalised in 1859 and had 51 cells.

Airdrie Working Men's Club was established in 1869. Also around this time, football and cricket began to emerge as popular sports. Following the codification of association football rules a local team called Excelsior was formed in 1878 which would later be renamed Airdrieonians. Horse race meetings were also held in the town (1851–1870) but this land became the golf course for the newly formed Airdrie Golf Club in 1877.

Education posed a major problem with severe overcrowding in the few schools available, therefore three new school boards were established. In the early 1830s there were about 800 pupils while the town had about 7,000 residents. Fees were routinely charged within the schools with the belief they should be self-supporting until an act of Parliament of 1889 relieved some of the infant classes in schools of this burden. Airdrie Academy was built in 1849 and by 1919 all school boards were dissolved and Lanarkshire Education Authority took over responsibility for education throughout Lanarkshire.

Airdrie Public Observatory, one of only four public observatories in the UK (second oldest and smallest) – all in Scotland, was founded in the first library building in 1896, and is still operated in the present building by the Airdrie Astronomical Association a Scottish astronautic and astronomy society and registered charity.

By the turn of the 20th century variety shows were becoming popular in the area and by 1911 the Pavilion in Graham Street was built which after initially being used as a music hall started showing cinematographic pictures. Unfortunately it was destroyed by fire in 1917 but was rebuilt in 1919 and finally closed in 1970. The New Cinema was opened in 1920 in Broomknoll Street but it too has since closed. The town had no suitable venue for larger functions so in 1912 the Sir John Wilson Town Hall was opened (following an offer of £10,000 from Sir John Wilson).

On 9 July 1918 nineteen miners died in the Stanrigg Pit Disaster. The pit was situated in boggy land and collapsed after being saturated by heavy rainfall.

=== 1920 onwards ===
Airdrie Corporation Order Confirmation Act 1951
- Act of Parliament
- Parliament of the United Kingdom
- Long title: An Act to confirm a Provisional Order under the Private Legislation Procedure (Scotland) Act 1936 relating to Airdrie Corporation.
- Citation: 14 & 15 Geo. 6. c. xiii

Dates
- Royal assent: 10 May 1951
Other legislation
Relates to	Private Legislation Procedure (Scotland) Act 1936

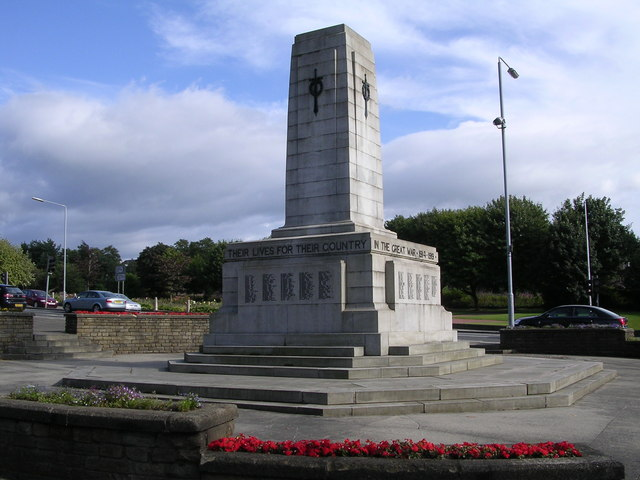
Airdrie War Memorial

At the end of the First World War, Airdrie was hard hit with many casualties from the war. Unemployment reached 30% in the local area. After years of moving from one site to another, the first purpose built library in Airdrie was opened in Anderson Street in 1895. However, this only lasted 30 years until the current Airdrie Library building was erected in 1925.

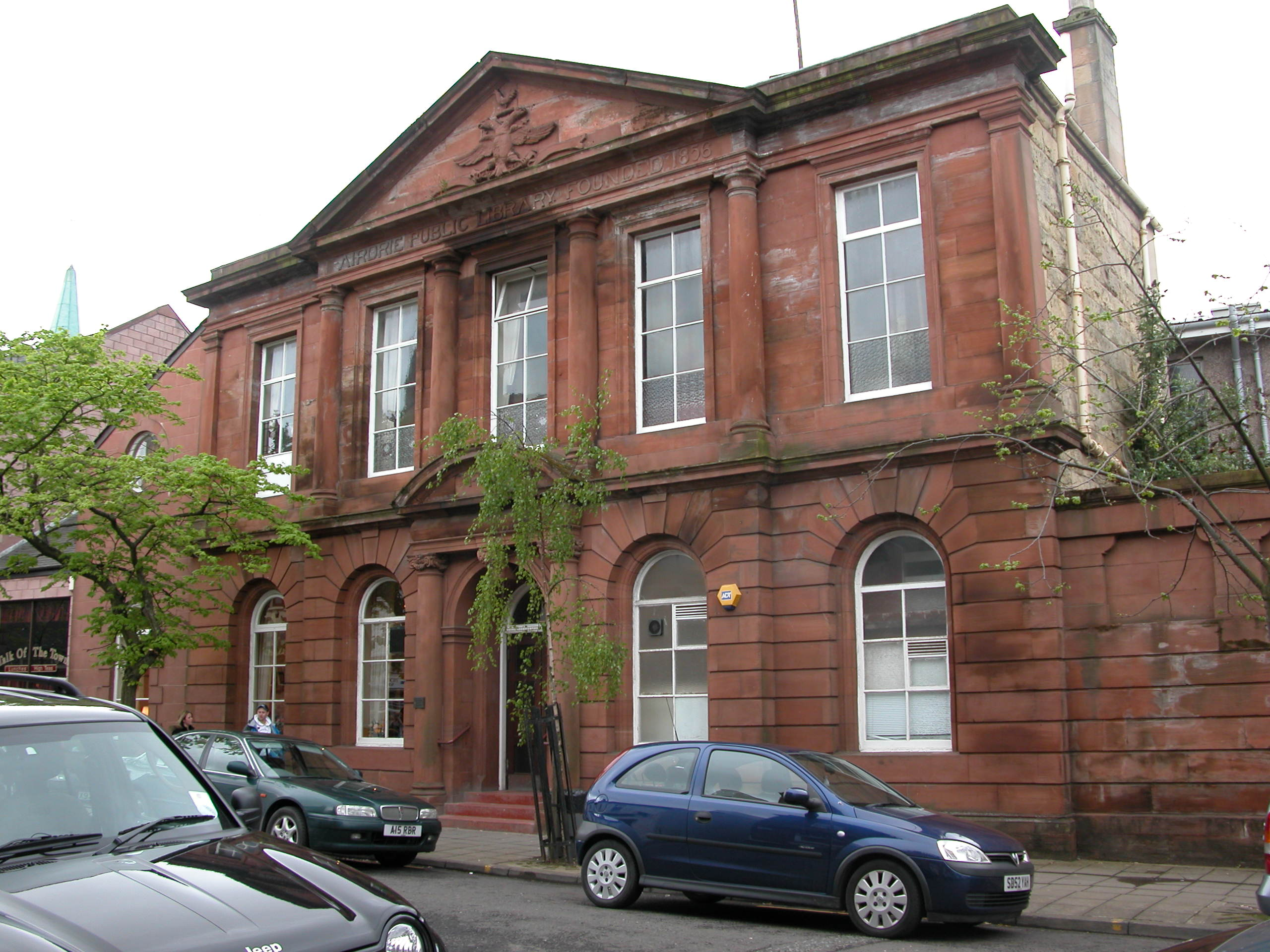
The first Airdrie Public Library building, a Carnegie library opened 1894.

Conditions in the town did not really improve until well after the Second World War but in 1949 the Boots pharmaceutical company and Banner Textiles Ltd were attracted to the town (between them employing 1200). With this impetus, new companies began to consider Airdrie as a viable option for business and in 1958 Pye opened employing over 1000 people. The emergence of industrial estates was also prevalent around this time (Newhouse, Chapelhall, and Brownsburn). The Airdrie Arts Centre opened in 1967 in the former Airdrie Library building, and was a popular venue for concerts and plays, but was closed in 2012 by North Lanarkshire Council.

Between 1964 and 1991, the town was the location of a Royal Observer Corps monitoring bunker, to be used in the event of a nuclear attack. No trace remains today.

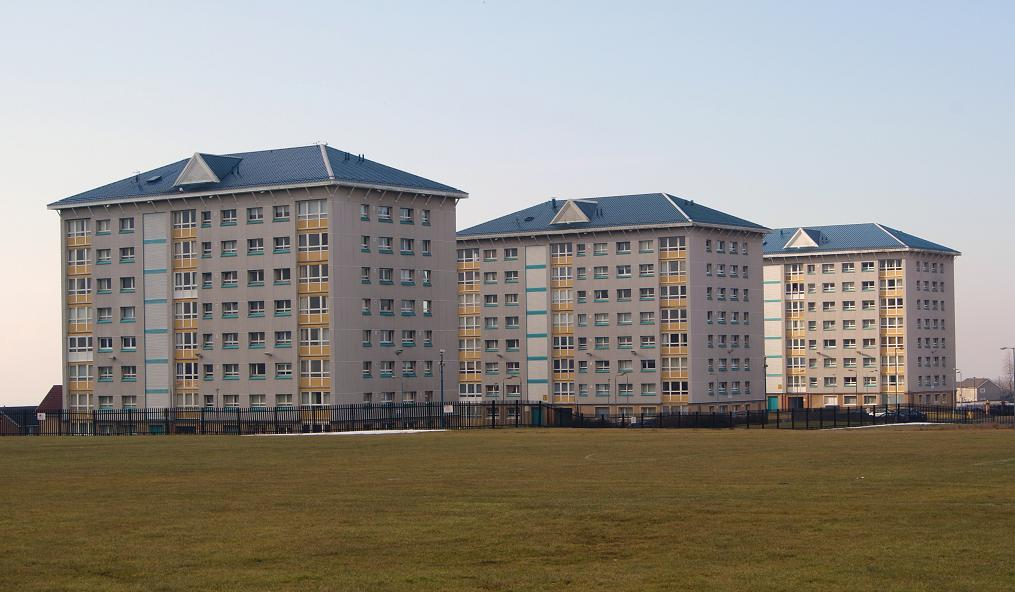
The Holehills Flats (now demolished)

The 1970s saw the opening of Monklands Hospital, which replaced an older hospital on the Airdrie House estate. Airdrie hosted the National Mòd in 1993.

In the 21st century, the town has continued to grow as a residential settlement, with development and conversion of some town centre buildings, such as the Historic Orrs Department Store into new homes. In 2024, permission was given for a significant expansion of the town, with the creation of up to 3,000 new homes in East Airdrie on former mining land.

== Governance ==
Airdrie is represented by several tiers of elected government. North Lanarkshire Council, the unitary local authority for Airdrie, is based at Motherwell, and is the executive, deliberative and legislative body responsible for local governance. The Scottish Parliament is responsible for devolved matters such as education, health and justice, while reserved matters are dealt with by the Parliament of the United Kingdom.

=== Westminster ===
The town forms part of the burgh constituency of Airdrie and Shotts, electing one Member of Parliament (MP) to the House of Commons. In 2005, changes to the constituency boundaries saw part of its area transferred to Motherwell and Wishaw, offset by the addition of part of Hamilton North and Bellshill.

The location has been represented by several prominent Labour MPs in recent years:

- John Smith, MP for North Lanarkshire 1970–1983 and Monklands East 1983–1994 (Eastern Coatbridge and Airdrie area). Former Shadow Chancellor and then leader of the Labour Party until his untimely death in 1994.
- Helen Liddell, MP for Monklands East 1994–1997, Airdrie and Shotts 1997–2005, Secretary of State for Scotland and subsequently Britain's High Commissioner to Australia.
- John Reid, MP for Airdrie and Shotts 2005–2010, a high-profile minister including as the first Roman Catholic to be appointed Secretary of State for Northern Ireland.

The current MP for the constituency since 2024 is the Scottish National Party's Kenneth Stevenson. who was preceded by Anum Qaisar from 2021 to 2024. .

=== Scottish Parliament ===
For the purposes of the Scottish Parliament, Airdrie forms part of the Airdrie constituency. This has slightly different boundaries from those of the UK Parliament constituency: previously the two seats were both titled "Airdrie and Shotts", however the Scottish Parliament seat was renamed to simply "Airdrie" ahead of the 2026 Scottish Parliament election. The current Member of the Scottish Parliament (MSP) for Airdrie is Neil Grey MSP (Scottish National Party), who won this seat (then called Airdrie and Shotts) in 2021.

In addition to this, Airdrie is represented by seven regional MSPs from the Central Scotland and Lothians West.

=== European Parliament ===
Before Brexit, it was part of the Scotland European Parliament constituency.

=== Local government ===
Up until 1975, Airdrie had its own Burgh Council. Between 1975 and 1996, Airdrie came under Monklands District Council operating in conjunction with Strathclyde Regional Council. Monklands District Council was headquartered in the Coatbridge Municipal Building. Many Airdrieonians felt short-changed by MDC's actions and a significant political scandal known as Monklandsgate greatly tarnished the council's reputation. After 1996, it came under the authority of the unitary North Lanarkshire Council. North Lanarkshire has many councillors; currently, the council is in control of the Labour group and the leader of the council is Jim Logue, councillor for Airdrie Central.

== Geography ==
=== Satellite villages ===
Chapelhall, Calderbank, Caldercruix, Gartness, Glenmavis, Greengairs, Longriggend, Plains, Stand, Upperton, Newhouse and Wattston are generally considered satellite villages of Airdrie.

=== Wards ===
Since the most recent major reorganisation in 2006, North Lanarkshire Council divides Airdrie into the following wards, each electing four councillors since the 2017 election:

- Ward 7 – Airdrie North (2019 population 20,137): Glenmavis, Caldercruix, Plains, Burnfoot, Thrashbush, Rochsoles, Holehills, Clarkston, Greengairs, Longriggend
- Ward 8 – Airdrie Central (2019 population 16,354): Airdrie Town Centre, Whinhall, Coatdyke, Gartlea, North Cairnhill, Central Park Area, Rawyards
- Ward 11 – Airdrie South (2019 population 19,934): Craignuek, Petersburn, Moffat Mills, Chapelhall, Calderbank, Brownsburn, South Cairnhill, Gartness

== Demography ==
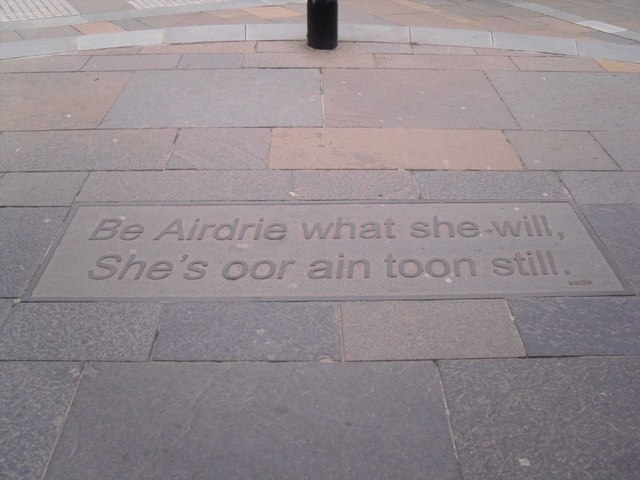
"Be Airdrie what she will, She's oor ain toon still." anonymous quotation on Graham Street

Historical records of Airdrie's population are available from the 18th, the early decades of the 19th century, and into the early 20th century.

At the 2022 Scottish Census, Airdrie had a population of 35,846 inhabitants. According to the 2001 Census, There were:

- 47.31 male, 52.69% female.
- 20.7% were under 16, 16.67% were pensioners.
- 46.61% were married (first marriage), 29.81% were single.
- 95.74% were born in Scotland or described their nationality as Scottish.
- 0.42% spoke Gaelic.

== Economy ==
=== Overview ===
As outlined in the history section, Airdrie's traditional economic activities of weaving, coal mining, and heavy industry have ceased to exist. Although the Glenflagler Distillery is now closed, the town still retains a strong involvement in the whisky industry. Airdrie was also home to a Crimpy Crisps factory. Given its location near to Glasgow and other commercial or industrial areas, Airdrie might now be considered something of a commuter town. In fact, housing construction in Airdrie has been very prominent in recent years, with builders developing a number of brownfield sites following the closure of various factories such as Boots (who closed their factory in 2004). Nonetheless, it does retain significant economic activity.

=== Notable employers ===
- Albert Bartlett & Sons, a supplier of root vegetables in the UK. The Bartlett brothers, Alan, 52, and Ronnie, 44 are jointly ranked in The Sunday Times Rich List 2008 as the 63rd richest persons in Scotland and the 969th richest persons in the UK with a worth valued at £80 million.
- Inver House Distillers Limited, headquarters and warehousing in Airdrie. Products include Old Pulteney, Balblair, Heather Cream and Coldstream Gin.
- Airdrie Savings Bank was a small commercial bank that operated in the town and around Lanarkshire.

=== Trading estates ===
There are two trading estates in the town, Brownsburn Industrial Estate and Osprey Trade Park.

== Culture ==
=== Places of interest ===
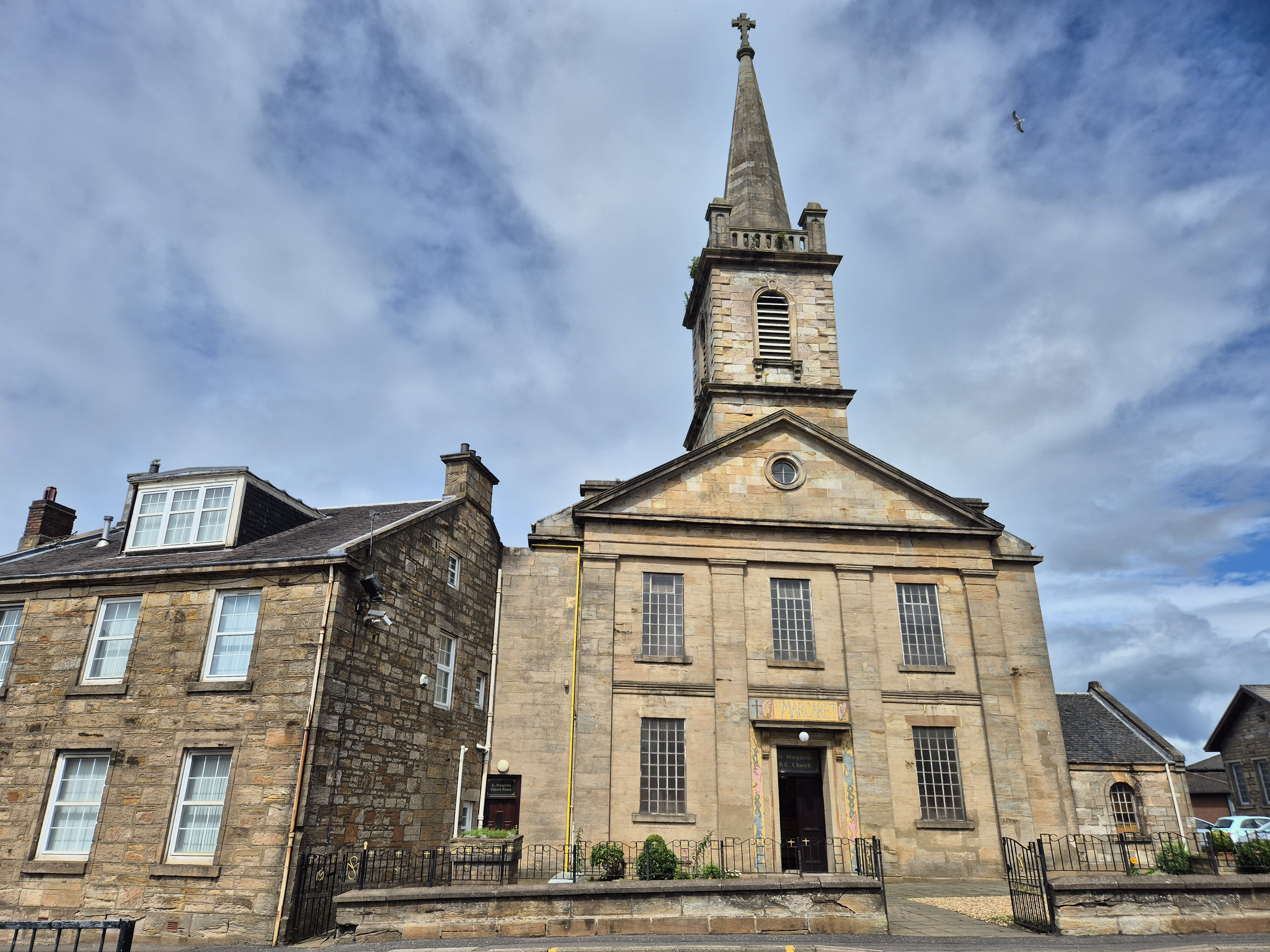
St Margaret's Church, Airdrie

- Airdrie Public Library
- Airdrie Public Observatory
- Arran View - villa built by Alexander Thomson in 1867.
- Black Hill transmitting station
- Centenary and West End Parks – including the Airdrie Cenotaph
- Monkland Canal – where the Vulcan, the world's first iron boat, was constructed and launched in 1819.
- New Monklands Parish Church
- The Wallace Stone – legend tells that William Wallace sharpened his sword on this stone on his way to the Battle of Falkirk.

=== Organisations ===
- The Moira Anderson Foundation, a national charity providing support for those affected by childhood sexual abuse

== Law ==
=== Police ===
Policing in Airdrie is undertaken by Police Scotland. Airdrie is part of Coatbridge Area Command with Chief Inspector Kenny MacLeod as the Area Commander. Airdrie also forms part of NA (or Monklands) sub division which includes Coatbridge and the surrounding area. There is one police office in Airdrie and this is open 24 hours.

=== Sheriff Court ===
Airdrie Sheriff Court is a modern building in Graham Street which provides a comprehensive local court service for the area including civil actions and criminal cases. It is administered by the Scottish Court Service and part of the South Strathclyde, Dumfries and Galloway Sheriffdom headed by a Sheriff Principal. It replaced the old County Buildings in Bank Street which was demolished in 1969.

=== Other ===
- The Crown Office and Procurator Fiscal Service, responsible for the prosecution of crime in Scotland, maintains an office in the town directly opposite the Court.

== Religion ==
Christian Church of Scotland – Airdrie's Church of Scotland churches are part of the Presbytery of Hamilton.

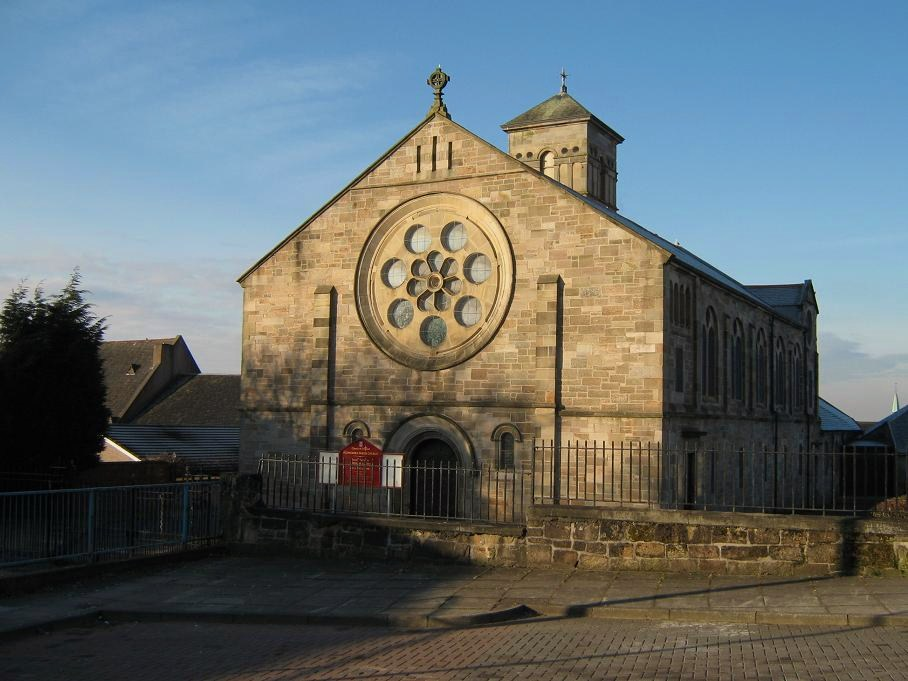
Cairnlea Church

- Cairnlea Church - formed by the amalgamation of Broomknoll Church and Flowerhill Church in 2016 and housed in the former Flowerhill building (1875)
- Clarkston Church (1837)
- High Church
- Jackson Church
- New Monkland Parish Church (bef. 1698) – In nearby Glenmavis.
- New Wellwynd (1834)
- St Columba's Church

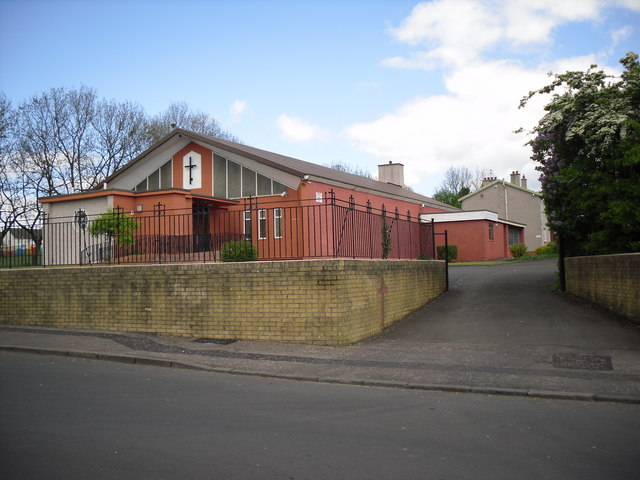
Saint Andrews Chapel

Roman Catholic Church – Airdrie's Roman Catholic churches are immediately governed by the Diocese of Motherwell, currently led by Bishop Joseph Toal. The Bishops' Conference of Scotland (effectively the Church's headquarters in Scotland) is situated in Airdrie.

- St Andrew's Church (Whinhall)
- St Edward's Church (Gartlea)
- St Margaret's Church (Airdrie centre)
- St Serf's Church (Rawyards)

Congregational Church – Airdrie's Congregational churches are associated with the Congregational Federation.

- Coatdyke Church
- Ebenezer Church (Broomknoll Street) (1882)
- Pilgrim Church

Other

- Airdrie Baptist Church (1843) – part of the Baptist Union of Scotland.
- Airdrie Islamic Centre (mosque) – part of the UK Islamic Mission.
- Airdrie Park – part of the United Reformed Church.
- Airdrie Reformed Presbyterian Church – part of the Reformed Presbyterian Church of Scotland, which is largely headquartered in Airdrie.
- The Church of Jesus Christ of the Latter-Day Saints Chapel
- Ebenezer Church (Aitchison Street) – Evangelical Church – Airdrie's Evangelical churches are Brethren and associated with the Evangelical Alliance.
- Jehovah's Witnesses' Kingdom Hall
- The Salvation Army, Airdrie Corps
- St Andrew's Hospice – operated by the Sisters of Charity.
- St Paul & St John the Baptist – part of the Scottish Episcopal Church, governed by the Diocese of Glasgow and Galloway.

== Transport ==
Airdrie railway station is on the electrified North Clyde Line. This railway provides a frequent train service to Glasgow via Coatbridge Sunnyside and Easterhouse. In 2010, the Airdrie–Bathgate rail link re-opened providing Airdrie with a direct commuter train service to Bathgate, Livingston North and Edinburgh Waverley. Drumgelloch railway station serves the eastern end of the town. Including the satellite village of Caldercruix, Airdrie is served by four stations; Caldercruix, Drumgelloch, Airdrie, and Coatdyke, on the border of Airdrie and Coatbridge.

Airdrie has road links to Glasgow, Edinburgh, Livingston, Motherwell, and Cumbernauld and is situated close to the M8 motorway. Bus services are largely undertaken by local operators, and links to Glasgow are provided by First Glasgow and McGills. McGill's took over most of the local companies in 2016 to form its 'Monklands' network in Go Zone 8. The services link all the local neighbourhoods with longer distance services e.g. the 212 from Coatbridge - Caldercruix via Airdrie and Plains, or the 247 from Monklands Hospital - Kirkintilloch via Airdrie, Glenmavis, Cumbernauld and Blackwood.

Airdrie is connected to the UK National Cycle Network by National Cycle Route 75. This route provides a path between Glasgow and Edinburgh. According to the Sustrans website: "there is currently a gap in the National Cycle Network route at Devol Glen, Port Glasgow." Other than the Sustrans path, there are no cycle lanes in Airdrie.

Historical transport links include:-

- Monkland Canal, 1794, commenced by James Watt
- Airdrie and Coatbridge Tramways
- Ballochney Railway, 1828
- Monkland and Kirkintilloch Railway, 1826
- Slamannan Railway
- Monkland Railways, formed in 1848 by the merger of the aforesaid local "coal railways".
- Edinburgh and Glasgow Railway
- North British Railway
- Caledonian Railway
- London and North Eastern Railway (LNER)
- London, Midland and Scottish Railway
- British Railways/British Rail - Scottish Region of British Railways

== Healthcare ==
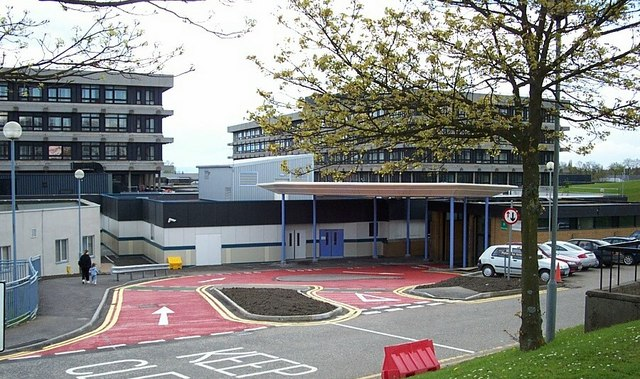
Monklands District General Hospital with the medical tower, the surgical tower and the A&E entrance

Airdrie is home to Monklands District General Hospital with a 24-hour Accident & Emergency department. Adjacent to Monklands Hospital is Maggie's Lanarkshire, part of the Maggie's Centres cancer support charity. There is a community health centre in Airdrie city centre on Graham Street.

== Education ==
The following are the secondary schools, all of which are run by North Lanarkshire Council:

- Airdrie Academy – Non-denominational, co-educational, comprehensive school
- Caldervale High – Non-denominational, co-educational, comprehensive school
- St Margaret's High – Roman Catholic, co-educational, comprehensive school

== International relations ==
Airdrie is twinned with:

- Arnhem, Gelderland, Netherlands
- Füssen, Bavaria, Germany

== Sport ==
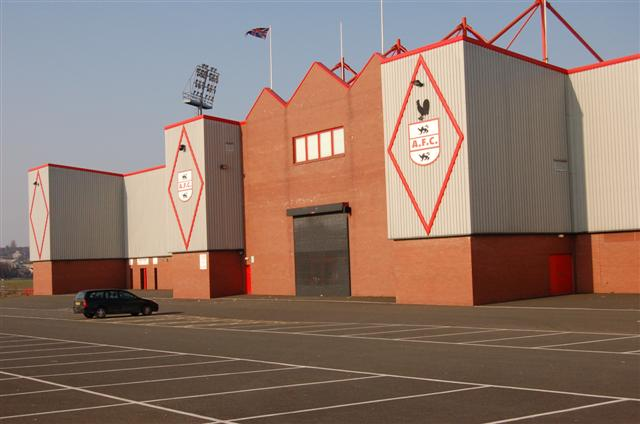
The Excelsior Stadium

- Angling - Airdrie is a popular destination for anglers from across the Central Belt, due to its lochs and reservoirs. These include: Airdrie & District Angling Club based at Hillend Loch.
- Athletics - Airdrie Harriers, one of North Lanarkshire's athletics clubs.
- Football - The town's major football club is Airdrieonians F.C., who play in the Scottish Championship, and are based at the Excelsior Stadium. They were formed as a replacement for the original Airdrieonians, who folded in May 2002.
- Golf - Airdrie Golf Club was established in 1877. It is a wooded parkland par 69 course with tight fairways and well-protected greens.
- Motor sport - The Monklands Sporting Car Club runs its events at the Forrestburn Hillclimb situated about 5 miles east of Airdrie.
- Rugby union - Airdrie was home to its own rugby union team called Waysiders RFC. This team was amalgamated to form Waysiders Drumpellier RFC which currently play out of Drumpellier RFC's traditional home ground in Langloan, Coatbridge.
- Sailing - The Monklands Sailing Club is based at Hillend Loch by Caldercruix.
- Tennis - Springwells Lawn Tennis Club. A member of the West of Scotland District and LTA County, divisions of Tennis Scotland.

== Notable people ==
- Bill Adam – racing driver
- Ian Aitken - political journalist
- Joe Allen - painter
- Ian Bannen – actor
- The Big Dish – pop/rock band
- John Carmichael – soldier and recipient of the Victoria Cross
- Reece Clarke – ballet dancer
- John Craig – geologist and lexicographer
- Paul Craig - Mixed Martial Artist
- Robert Craig - WWII Medal of Honor recipient
- Leo Cushley – Roman Catholic archbishop of St Andrews and Edinburgh
- Ryan Dalziel – racing driver
- Anton Danyluk - Love Island 2019 participant
- Ross Davidson – actor
- Hugh de Largie – Australian politician
- Nathan Evans - singer
- William Whigham Fletcher - biologist
- Emily Gerard – writer, whose works inspired Bram Stoker's Dracula and coined the term Nosferatu
- John Graham, 1st Viscount of Dundee – also known as 'Bluidy Clavers' and 'Bonnie Dundee'. Royalist and Jacobite soldier
- Walker Hamilton – writer
- Grant Harrold – broadcaster, and former Royal butler to Prince Charles and Camilla, Duchess of Cornwall
- Amanda Hendrick – high-fashion model
- Dee Hepburn – actress, best known for her role in Gregory's Girl
- David Keenan – writer, musician
- Jim Lambie – Turner Prize nominated artist.
- David Ross Lauder – soldier and recipient of the Victoria Cross
- Jason Leitch - National Clinical Director for Scotland. Dux of Airdrie Academy
- Sir George G. Macfarlane, engineer, scientific administrator and public servant.
- Alesha MacPhail - murder victim
- Thomas McAleese - lead vocalist of the band Marmalade
- John O'Neill – soldier and recipient of the Victoria Cross.
- James Bell Pettigrew - anatomist and naturalist
- William Robinson – swimmer, won silver in the Men's 200 metre Breaststroke at the 1908 Olympics in London.
- Jim Traynor – sports broadcaster and journalist.
- Kenny Williams – Scottish professional wrestler with Insane Championship Wrestling
- Sir John Wilson – Baronet (Wilson Baronetcy of Airdrie, which continues today with the 5th Baronet)

=== Footballers ===
- John Armstrong
- Barry Bannan
- Dick Black
- George Brown
- Jackie Campbell
- Sandy Clark
- Bobby Cumming
- Torrance Gillick
- Dick Hendrie
- Drew Jarvie
- Bobby Jeffrey
- Alan Lawrence – Nicknamed 'Nipper'.
- Brian McClair
- Bob McFarlane
- John McGregor
- Ian McMillan
- Robert Main
- Alan Morton – Nicknamed 'The Wee Blue Devil'.
- Billy Neil - Olympian
- Ally Roy
- Matthew Scott
- Gardner Speirs
- Sandy Thomson
- James White
- Martin Woods

== Climate ==
Climate data for Airdrie, United Kingdom
Month	Jan	Feb	Mar	Apr	May	Jun	Jul	Aug	Sep	Oct	Nov	Dec	Year
Record high °C (°F)	15 (56)	17 (55)	19 (59)	23 (75)	27 (81)	29 (85)	30 (86)	31 (88)	25 (78)	21 (70)	15 (59)	13 (57)	31 (88)
Mean daily maximum °C (°F)	6 (43)	6 (44)	8 (47)	11 (52)	15 (59)	17 (63)	18 (66)	18 (65)	15 (60)	12 (54)	8 (48)	6 (44)	12 (54)
Mean daily minimum °C (°F)	1 (34)	1 (34)	2 (36)	3 (38)	6 (43)	8 (48)	11 (52)	10 (51)	8 (47)	5 (42)	2 (37)	1 (35)	5 (41)
Record low °C (°F)	−17 (1)	−12 (9)	−8 (16)	−4 (24)	−3 (25)	0 (33)	3 (38)	1 (35)	−2 (27)	−7 (19)	−10 (14)	−17 (1)	−17 (1)
Average precipitation mm (inches)	86.9 (3.42)	79 (3.11)	74.4 (2.93)	46.5 (1.83)	33.5 (1.32)	38.6 (1.52)	49.5 (1.95)	52.6 (2.07)	56.6 (2.23)	84.8 (3.34)	84.8 (2.62)	74.9 (2.95)	762.1 (30)
Source: Weatherbase

== See also ==
- List of places in North Lanarkshire

== Sources ==
- Begg, E. and Rich, D. (1991) On the Trail of Merlin. ISBN 0-85030-939-5
- Geddes, C.M. (1995) Airdrie 300:A Souvenir Brochure. Motherwell: Monklands Library Services. ISBN 0-946120-29-3
- Hutton, G. (1997) Lanarkshire's Mining Legacy. Catrine: Stenlake Publishing. ISBN 1-84033-015-5
- McCutcheon, C. (1994) Old Airdrie. Catrine: Stenlake Publishing. ISBN 1-872074-34-0
- Moir, H. (2001) Airdrie. Stroud: Tempus Publishing Ltd. ISBN 0-7524-2368-1
- Scobbie, J.K. (1985) Book of Airdrie'. Motherwell: Monklands Library Services. ISBN 0-946120-08-0
- Wilson, R. (1997) Old Airdrie Villages. Catrine: Stenlake Publishing. ISBN 1-84033-004-X
