= John Craig (geologist) =

Scottish geologist and lexicographer

- Born: Airdrie, North Lanarkshire
- Occupation: Geologist

Academic background
- Education: Professor

John Craig FGS (1796–1880) was a Scottish geologist and lexicographer. He was lecturer in geology at Anderson's University, Glasgow, and a Fellow of the Geological Society of London. In 1849 he published a dictionary.

== Early life and education ==
Born at Airdrie, North Lanarkshire, the son of a merchant, Craig had only six months in a local school and began life as a weaver. Self-taught, he later kept a school at Shotts and another at Echo Bank, Newington, and began to write and publish poetry. He next studied geology and won a prize of the Highland Society for geological work in Lanarkshire. From this, he gained work for the Glasgow Town Council making surveys of public and private property and began to give lectures on geology and to write geological treatises. He became a frequent contributor to the liberal newspapers in Glasgow.

The new Craig's Universal dictionary was issued in two volumes of 1,000 pages each, and also in monthly parts.

Craig died in 1880.

== Publications ==
- John Craig, 'On the Carboniferous formation of the lower ward of Lanarkshire', in Transactions of the Highland and Agricultural Society in the year 1839 (prize essay)
- John Craig FGS, A New Universal, Technological, Etymological, and Pronouncing Dictionary of the English language, embracing all the terms used in Art, Science and Literature, in two volumes (London: Henry George Collins, 1849)
