= Airdrie Observatory =

Astronomical observatory in Airdrie, Scotland

Coordinates: 55°51′56″N 3°58′58″W

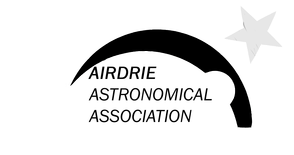
The logo of the Airdrie Astronomical Association.

Airdrie Observatory (55° 51’ 56” N, 3° 58’ 58” W) is a fully operational, historic public astronomical observatory, which is part of the library building in the town of Airdrie, North Lanarkshire, Scotland. There are only four public observatories operating in the United Kingdom, all of which are in Scotland. Airdrie Observatory is the smallest, and second oldest.

The observatory is owned and funded by Culture NL, and operated on their behalf by the Airdrie Astronomical Association (AAA), a local astronomy club and registered charity. The current observatory curators are AAA members William Tennant and Jack Frederick.

== Main telescope ==
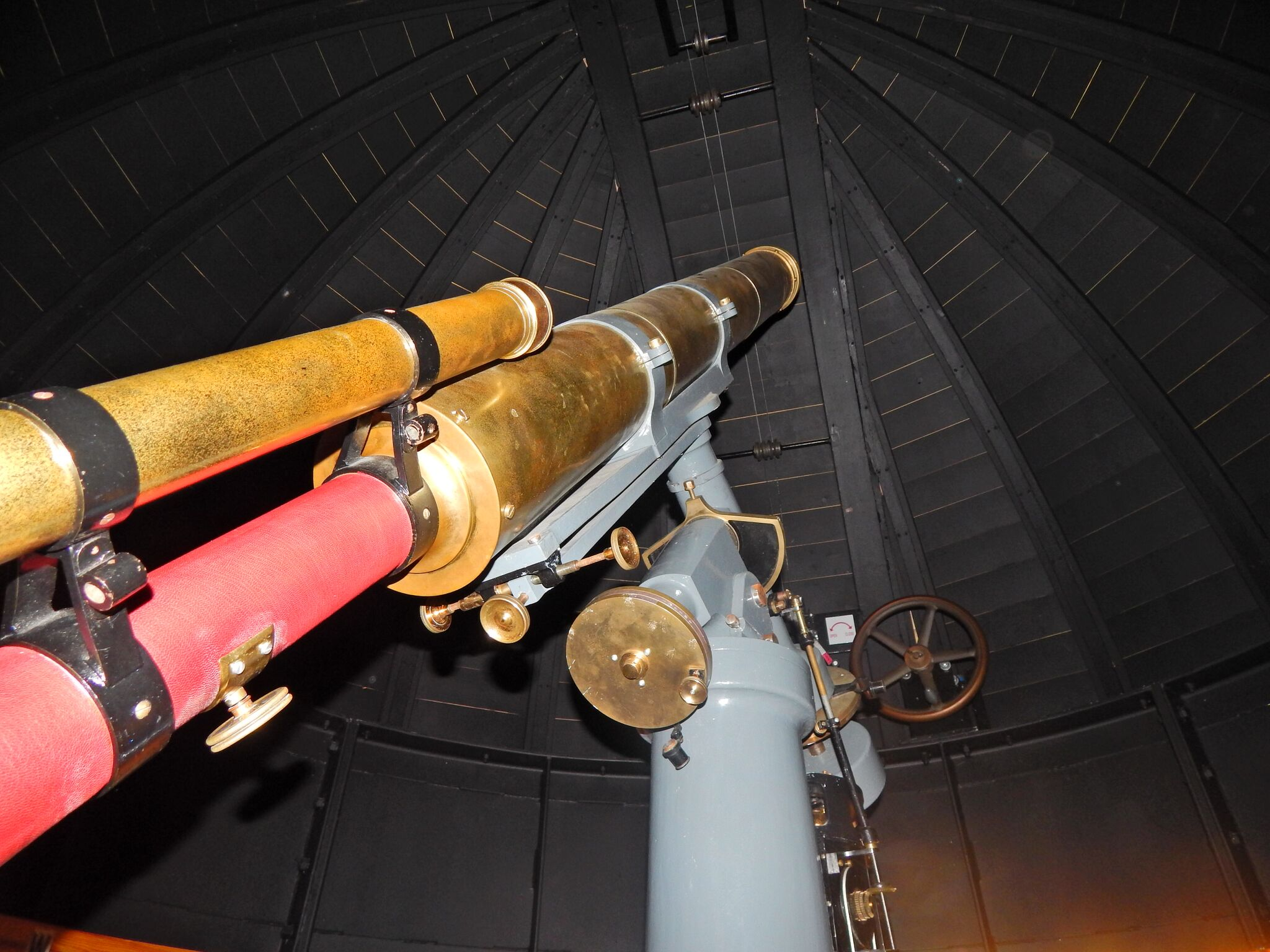
The Observatory's main refracting telescope

Airdrie Observatory is home to a 6" Victorian refracting telescope with an equatorial mount and clockwork drive which is used to track objects across the sky. A manual mechanism is used to open and rotate the observatory's dome.

The telescope eyepieces for the telescope provided a range between 60 and 350 times magnification. The telescope was adapted to use more modern eyepieces. In its day, the Airdrie Observatory telescope would have been considered to be a research grade telescope.

== History ==
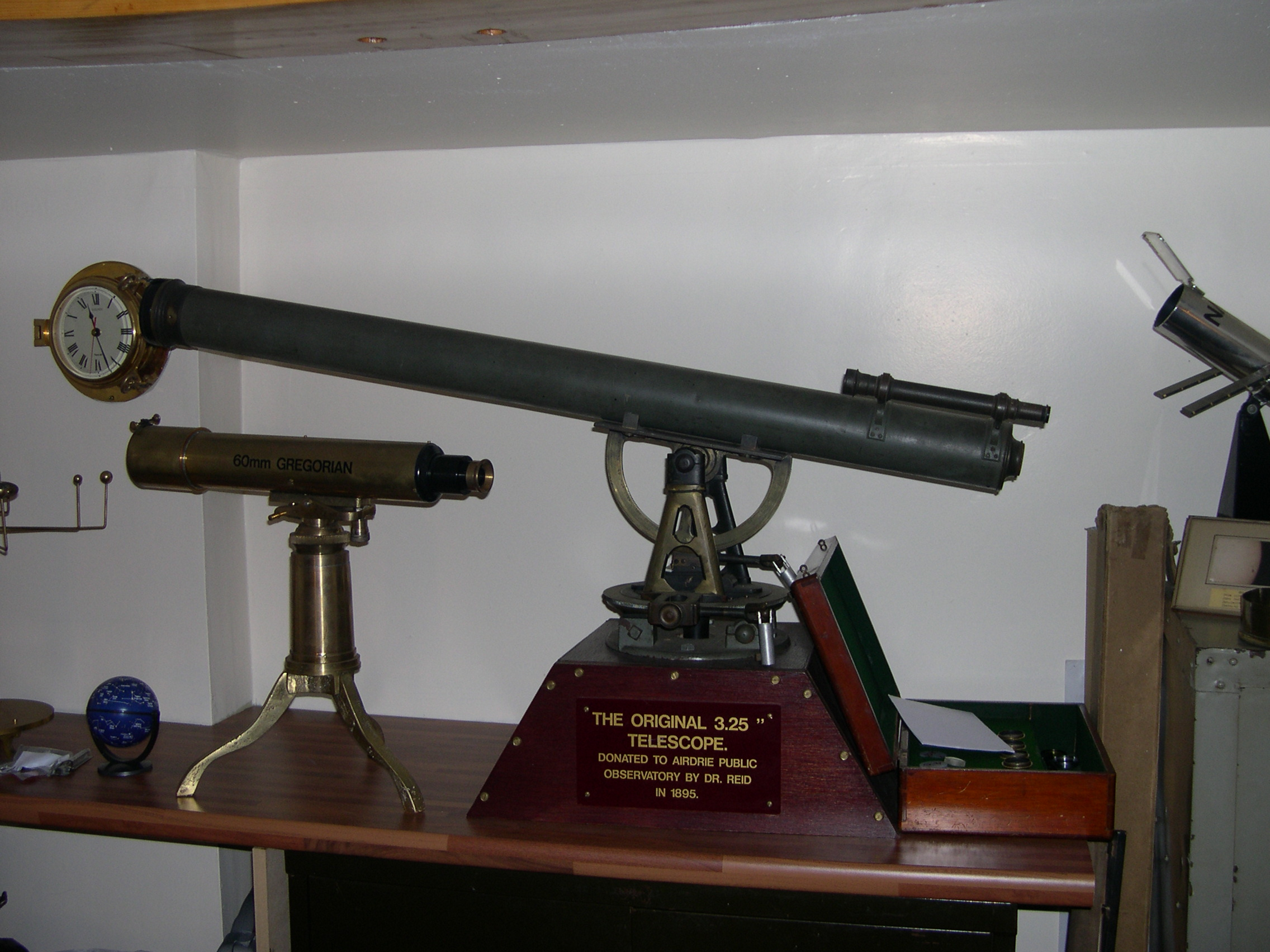
Dr Reid's 3.25-inch (83 mm) refractor telescope in Airdrie Observatory

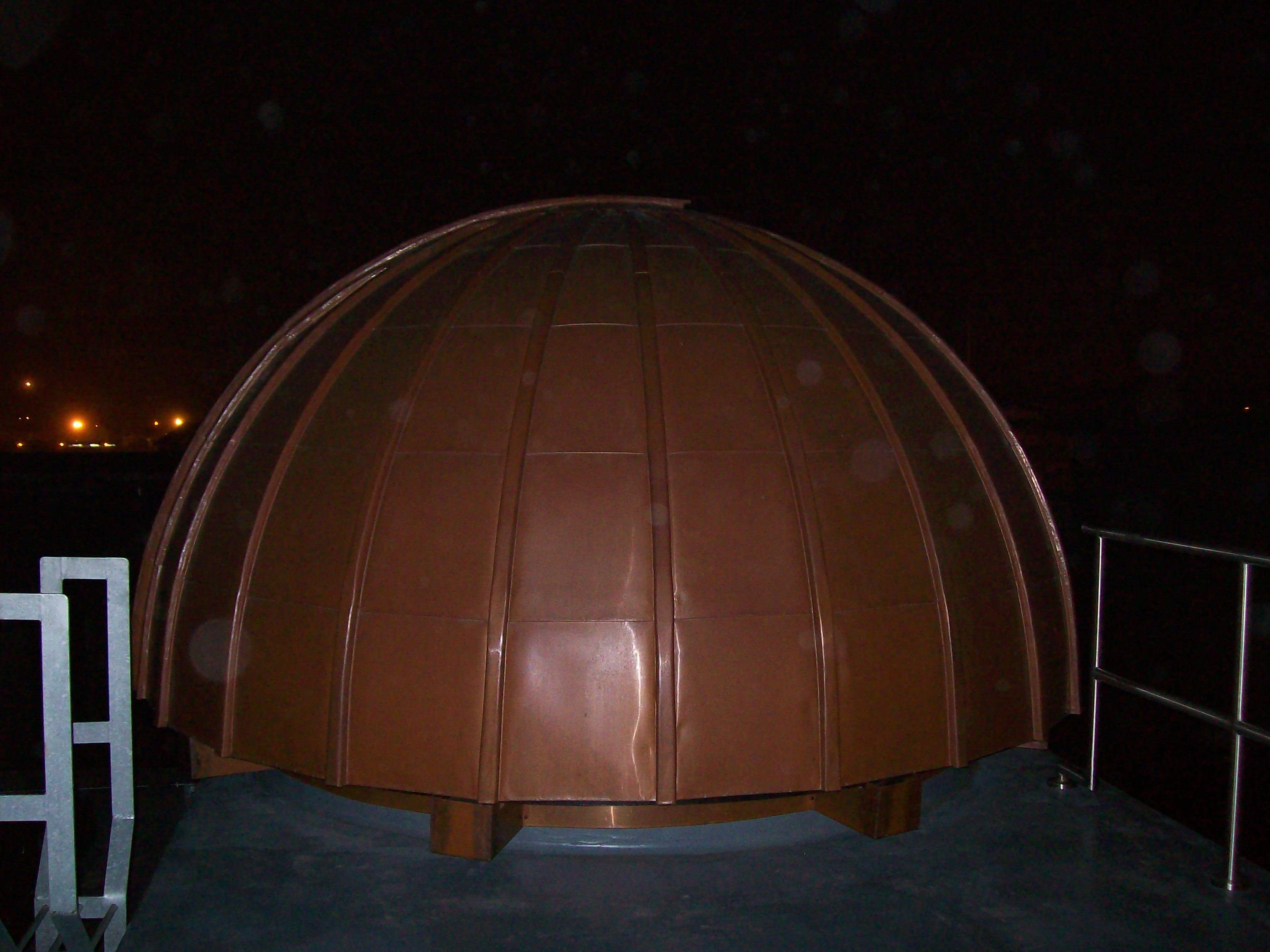
The Airdrie Observatory dome.

From 1896 to 1925 Airdrie Observatory was located in the original Airdrie Public Library (which became Airdrie Arts Centre). This library was funded in part by a £1,000 donation from Andrew Carnegie, a Scottish-American philanthropist.

The original 3.25“ refracting telescope was given to the town by Dr Thomas Reid, an eminent Glasgow oculist and philanthropist. This telescope is no longer in use as repairs cannot be undertaken due to its age and fragility, but it can be seen in the local history room of today's library.

Eventually the library was deemed to be too small and on 25 September 1925, the current library building was opened, funded this time by Airdrie Savings Bank and by the Carnegie United Kingdom Trust.

The purpose-built observatory was incorporated into the new library building, with its dome on the library roof.

In 2013, the observatory underwent extensive refurbishment, including the installation of a new dome, and restoration of the main telescope.

== Apollo astronauts' visits ==
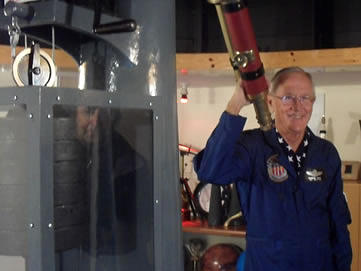
Charlie Duke at Airdrie Observatory.

As part of AAA secretary Aileen Malone's “Walk With Destiny” project, three Apollo astronauts visited the observatory between 2010 and 2012:

- Brigadier General Charlie Duke, the Apollo 16 Lunar Module Pilot, and the 10th man to walk on the Moon, visited in October 2010, and spoke to local school children about his experiences;
- Colonel Al Worden, Command Module Pilot on Apollo 15 visited in June 2012. Like Duke, Worden gave a talk and answered questions from local school children;
- Captain Richard Gordon, Command Module Pilot on the Apollo 12 mission, visited in October 2012, giving a lecture to space enthusiasts at Glasgow Caledonian University.

All three astronauts accepted the position of Honorary President of AAA. Sir Patrick Moore was AAA's first Honorary President, from 2009 until his death in 2012.

== Airdrie Astronomical Association ==
Airdrie Astronomical Association, commonly abbreviated to AAA, is a Scottish amateur astronomy club, founded on 1 May 2009. Currently the AAA operates Airdrie Observatory on behalf of Culture NL. The AAA hold weekly meetings in New Wellwynd Parish Church. Every meeting features a presentation from either a club member or guest speaker. The AAA opens the Observatory during astronomical events, at open days, at ten evening sessions between November and January, and, by arrangement, for groups wishing to visit.

== See also ==
- List of astronomical observatories
- List of astronomical societies
- Space telescope
- Timeline of telescopes, observatories, and observing technology

=== Other public observatories ===
- Royal Observatory – Edinburgh
- Coats Observatory – Paisley
- Mills Observatory – Dundee
