= Roughrigg =

Coordinates: 55°51′19.2″N 3°54′06.4″W

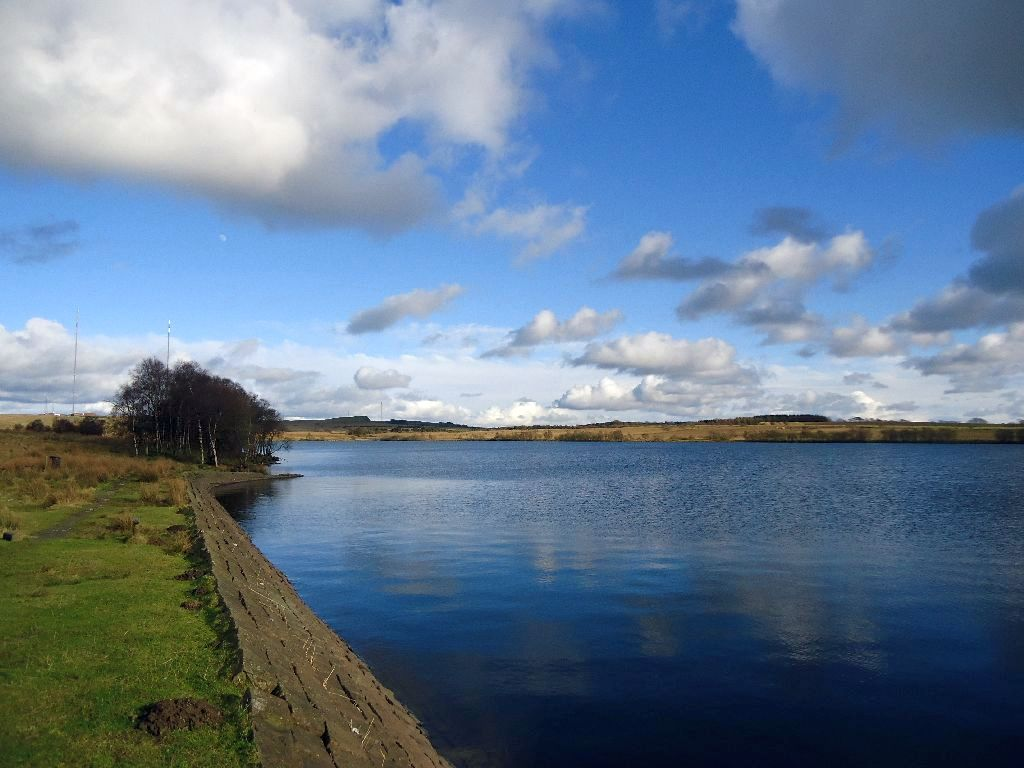
The reservoir

Roughrigg is a reservoir in North Lanarkshire. The reservoir itself is some 137 acres in extent. The reservoir is located about 3 miles (4.8 km) east of Airdrie.

== History ==
Archeological evidence from Roughrigg includes several prehistoric flints.

The reservoir was built between 1846 and 1849 to supply local drinking water to the populations of Airdrie and Coatbridge and to feed the Monkland Canal. It subsequently passed into the care of Scottish Water. For drinking water, the facility used a micro straining plant (mechnical filtration) that was installed in the 1950s. In 1960, the reservoir was recorded as having 558 million gallons of water storage.

In early 2021, Scottish Water launched a consultation on a proposal to drain the reservoir and replant it as woodland as it was no longer being used by them to supply water and the dam was at high risk of failure. In March 2021, the consultation closed. In June 2021, Scottish Water announced that following the consultation it would retain the reservoir site and improve the infrastructure.

== Leisure Use ==
A local fishing club, the Roughrigg Angling Association has been at the site since the late 1990s. Fish at the site included brown trout and rainbow trout. The site is also used by walkers and other leisure users.
