= Airdrie Town Hall =

Municipal Building in Airdrie, Scotland

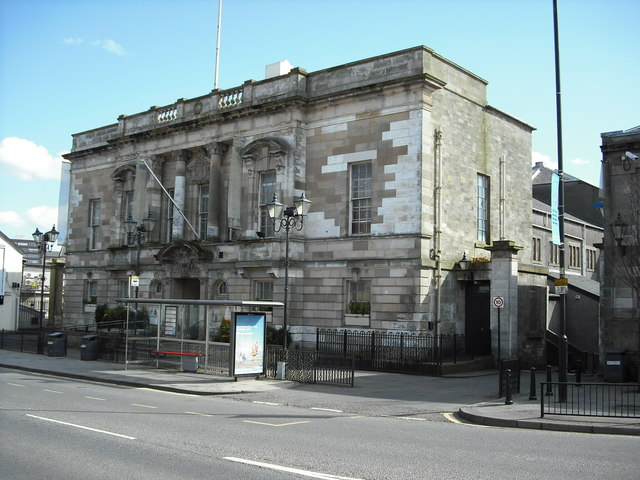
- Airdrie Town Hall

- Shown in North Lanarkshire
- 55.8653°N 3.9836°W
- Location: Stirling Street, Airdrie

History
- Built: 1912

Site notes
- Architect: John Thomson
- Architectural style: Neoclassical style

Listed Building – Category B
- Official name: Stirling Street, Sir John Wilson Town Hall Including Gatepiers
- Designated: 19 April 1993
- Reference no.: LB20947

Airdie Town Hall, also known as the Sir John Wilson Town Hall, is an events venue in Stirling Street, Airdrie, North Lanarkshire, Scotland. It is a Category B listed building.

== History ==
In the early 20th century, the administrative centre of the town was the old town house in Bank Street which had been completed in 1826. However, civic leaders needed a public hall in which to hold concerts and other public events and the businessman and former member of parliament for Falkirk Burghs, Sir John Wilson, 1st Baronet offered to contribute £10,000 towards the cost of construction. The site they selected on the south side of Stirling Street had previously been occupied by a building known as Miller's Court.

The new building was designed by John Thomson in the neoclassical style, built in ashlar stone and completed in 1912. The design involved a symmetrical main frontage with seven bays facing onto Stirling Street; the central section of five bays, which slightly projected forward, featured a doorway flanked by pilasters and brackets supporting a segmentally arched pediment with the burgh coat of arms in the tympanum; on either side of the doorway were oculi with garland surrounds. There was a Distyle in antis in the central three bays on the first floor with Corinthian order columns and pilasters supporting a large entablature and a balustrade; there was a sash window with the burgh coat of arms in the pediment in the central bay and sash windows with open pediments on either side of the Distyle in antis.

Performers at the town hall have included the rock band, The Spencer Davis Group, in January 1966 and the rock band, The Proclaimers, in June 2007. The town hall also hosted the annual Gaelic festival, the Royal National Mòd, in 1993. Events also included concerts and theatrical performances arranged by the Airdrie and Coatbridge Amateur Operatic Society which had been performing in the building since it opened.

By the early 20th century surveys indicated that the extensive use of the building, which was exceeding 200 functions a year, had caused significant deterioration to its fabric of the building to the extent that it was no longer wind or watertight. After an extensive programme of refurbishment works, which was financed in part by the Heritage Lottery Fund and carried out by Graham Construction to a design by Austin-Smith:Lord at a cost of £3.5 million, the building re-opened as arts and community events venue in 2012. The refurbishment included improvements to the two principal rooms, the large theatre hall which is used concerts and conferences as well as for weddings and civil partnership ceremonies, and the upper lesser hall which is used for smaller events.

== See also ==
- List of listed buildings in Airdrie, North Lanarkshire
