= Forrestburn Hillclimb =

Motorcar racetrack near Kirk o' Shotts, Scotland

Coordinates: 55°51′49″N 3°49′15″W

Forrestburn Speed Hill Climb is a 1,030-metre (3,380 ft) hillclimb track rising from 221m to 246m AOD with a maximum gradient of 1:4 near Kirk o' Shotts in North Lanarkshire, central Scotland. The track opened in 1993, and was the first purpose-built hillclimb track in the United Kingdom to be completed since Brooklands in the 1930s. Forrestburn Hillclimb is operated by Monklands Sporting Car Club, and all speed hillclimbs at Forrestburn are rounds of the Scottish Hillclimb Championship. The site was designed by Willie Miller Urban Design as part of a projected Scottish motor racing circuit which was never taken forward.
