= Airdrie & Coatbridge Advertiser =

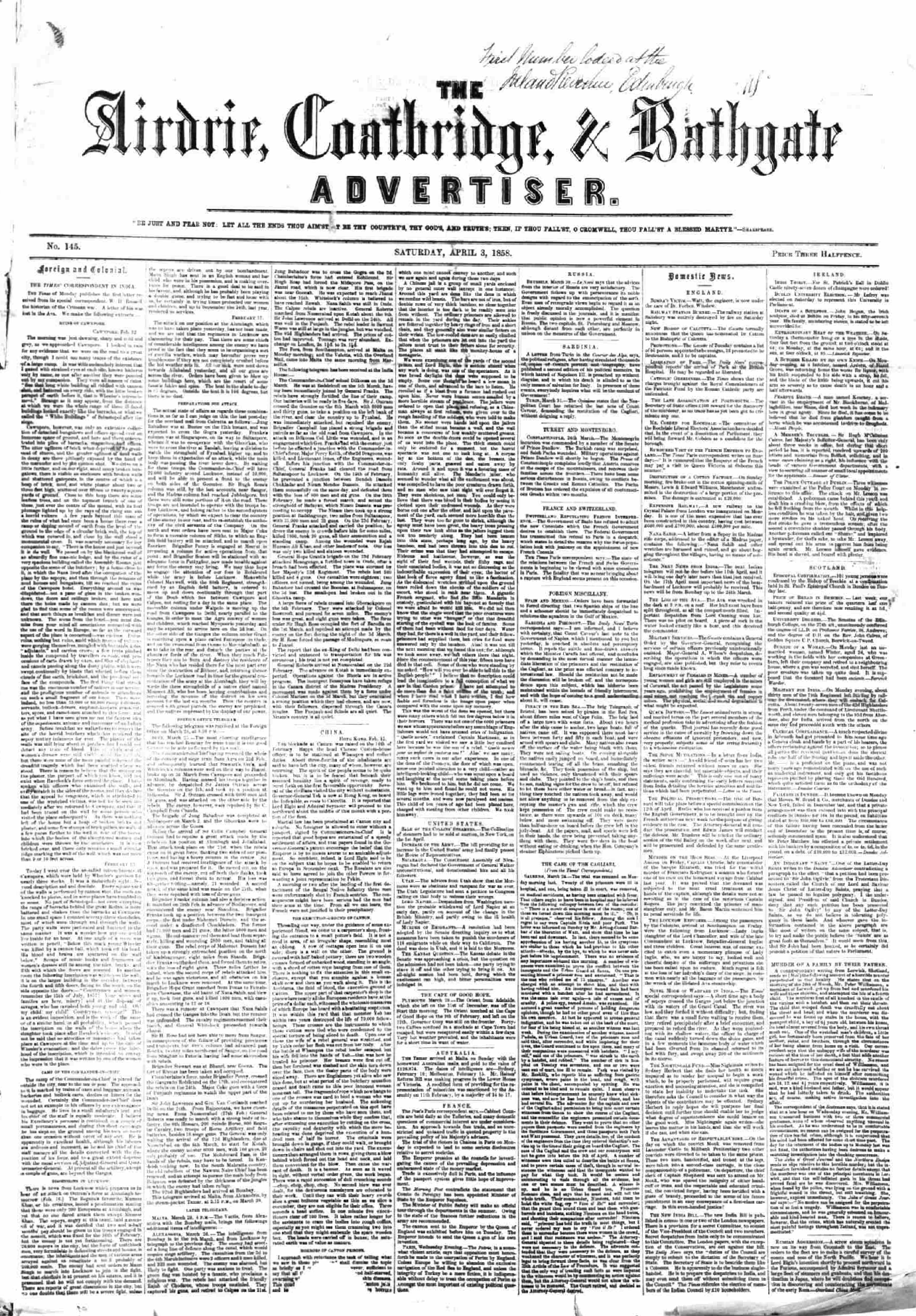
- The Airdrie & Coatbridge Advertiser's 3 April 1958 issue
- Type: Weekly newspaper
- Owner(s): Reach plc
- Founded: 1855
- Circulation: 909 (as of 2023)
- Website: dailyrecord.co.uk

The Airdrie & Coatbridge Advertiser is a tabloid newspaper published by Scottish and Universal Newspapers, a division of Reach plc, in Airdrie and Coatbridge, North Lanarkshire. The Airdrie & Coatbridge Advertiser is a weekly newspaper, printed every Wednesday, the newspaper printed in Blantyre.

The paper dates from 1855.
