= Deans, West Lothian =

Coordinates: 55.902699°N 3.552318°W

Deans: Scottish Gaelic: Stèisean Dhunlèibhe; Scots: Deans (Leivinstoun Station)
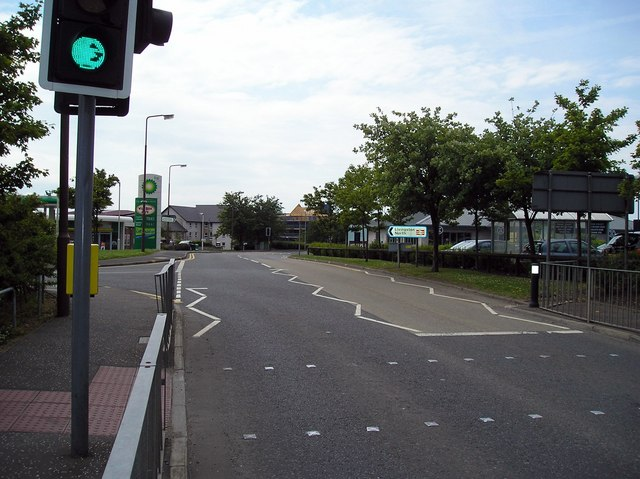
- Carmondean Centre

- Location within West Lothian
- Population: 3,641 (2010)
- OS grid reference: NT0268
- Council area: West Lothian
- Lieutenancy area: West Lothian
- Country: Scotland
- Sovereign state: United Kingdom
- Post town: LIVINGSTON
- Postcode district: EH54
- Dialling code: 01506
- Police: Scotland
- Fire: Scottish
- Ambulance: Scottish
- UK Parliament: Livingston
- Scottish Parliament: Almond Valley; Lothian

Deans is a small community within the town of Livingston in West Lothian, Scotland. Deans is situated in the northern part of Livingston, The western area of Deans was formerly known as Livingston Station, as it is the location of former oil works and a railway station. In 2010 the population of Deans was 3,641.

== History ==
Deans takes its name from the Former Deans Oil Works which contained a small settlement called Deans Cottages.

The western part of Deans was originally a village called Livingston Station and was named after the now closed Livingston railway station, The station was named after the village of Livingston which is now called Livingston Village. Deans was historically part of Linlithgowshire. The western part of Deans is sometimes still called Livingston Station.

In 1962 the new town of Livingston was created and the area's size expanded rapidly. The former village of Livingston Station has now been absorbed by Deans.

The most famous event to happen in Deans was the Livingston UFO Incident on 9 November 1979, when Robert Taylor, employed by the Livingston Development Corporation, is said to have encountered a UFO on Dechmont Law, The incident was investigated by Lothian and Borders Police. It is the only UFO incident that was part of a criminal investigation in the United Kingdom.

== Geography ==
The area around Deans is rich in oil shale which was a major employer in the area. The centre of Deans is 523 feet (159 m) above sea level. The highest point in Deans is Dechmont Law which is 712 feet (217 m) above sea level.

=== Boundaries ===
The northern boundary of Deans is marked by the M8 motorway which connects Glasgow to Edinburgh. The southern boundary is marked by the North Clyde Railway Line, to the west is Deans Road and to the east is Deans North Road and Dechmont Law.

== Economy ==
There are two shopping areas of Deans. The main shopping centre of Deans is the Carmondean Centre which consists of some small shops, sit-in and take-away restaurants, a bank and a Morrisons supermarket. There is also a care home called Restondene. The other area is along Main Street in the Livingston Station area of Deans where there is a Co-Operative store and a few take-away food shops.

Deans also has an industrial estate that houses a number of businesses including Amaryllis Group, BFP Wholesale, Bobby's Food, Christian Salvesen, CSI Products, Dexion Store, Bott Workplace, LIDL UK, First Edinburgh Ltd, Tesco Distribution Ltd, Scottish Motor Auction Group, West Lothian Food & Health Development, Scholastic Book Fairs Ltd, Space Solutions Ltd, and West Lothian Council.

== Governance ==
Deans is covered by the Livingston North Ward in West Lothian Council and the Livingston North Local Area Committee. There are four councilors.

In order to build, manage and promote Livingston a quango of the United Kingdom Government was formed, the Livingston Development Corporation which oversaw construction of the area from 1962 to 22 March 1997 when its responsibilities were transferred to West Lothian Council.

Deans has been part of the Almond Valley Constituency since 1999 and is represented by the Scottish National Party (SNP) Angela Constance who has held the seat since 2007 when the constituency was called Livingston.

Deans has been part of the Livingston UK Parliament constituency since 1983 and since 2015 has been represented by the Scottish National Party MP Hannah Bardell.

Prior to Brexit in 2020 it was part of the Scotland European Parliament constituency.

== Public Services ==
Water and Sewage services are provided by Scottish Water. The distribution network operator is Scottish Power. Deans has two post offices, one located in the Carmondean Centre and the other located on Main Street. Deans has its own library Carmondean Library at the Livingston North Partnership Centre run by West Lothian Council.

== Culture and Recreation ==
There are two play areas in Deans, one on Glen Road and the other next to the Carmondean Centre. Nearby is the Deer Park Golf and Country Club, which contains a golf course and a bowling alley. Deans also had an indoor go-karting track called Racing Karts.

== Policing ==
Deans is covered by the Livingston North Policing Neighbourhood and the F (West Lothian) division. The local police force is Police Scotland with the nearest station located at West Lothian Civic Centre in Livingston town centre.

== Education ==
Deans has three primary schools, Deans Primary, Meldrum Primary and St John's RC Primary. There is also a newly rebuilt secondary school, Deans Community High School.

== Religion ==
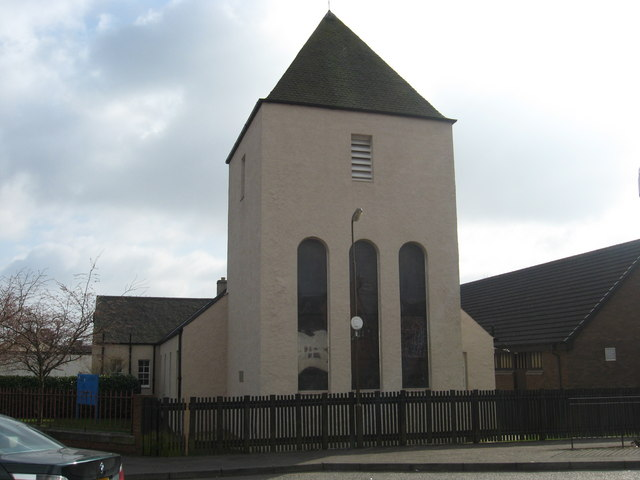
St. Andrew's Church, Deans

Deans has a Church of Scotland church called St. Andrew's Church, which is located in the Livingston Station area of Deans. St. Andrew's Church is part of the Livingston Old Parish along with Livingston old Kirk in Livingston Village.

Deans has a Roman Catholic church in the Carmondean area called St Peters RC Church which is part of the Livingston Catholic Parishes.

== Transport ==
The M8 motorway runs adjacent to the area. Bus routes 73, X27, X28 & N28 serve the area. Buses provide links to other areas of Livingston, nearby towns such as Bathgate, Blackburn, East Calder and to Edinburgh

Deans is served by Livingston North railway station on the North Clyde Line providing a service to Edinburgh Waverley and Glasgow Queen Street every 15 minutes Monday-Saturday daytime, and every 30 minutes on evenings and Sunday.

== Media ==
There was previously a Livingston Post newspaper which was stopped in the early 1990s.
