= Bathgate (disambiguation) =

Bathgate is a town in West Lothian, Scotland.

Bathgate may also refer to:

== Places ==
- Bathgate (Scottish Parliament constituency), West Lothian, Scotland
- Bathgate (ward), West Lothian, Scotland
- Bathgate, Bronx, New York
- Bathgate, North Dakota, in the United States
- Bathgate (1986) railway station
- Bathgate railway station
- Bathgate (Lower) railway station
- Bathgate (Upper) railway station
- Bathgate Industrial Park
- Bathgate was used (historically) as the name of a locality in New South Wales, Australia, where oil shale was mined (see Marrangaroo)

== People ==
- Andy Bathgate (1932–2016), Canadian professional hockey centre
- H. S. Bathgate (1853–1963), Scottish plasterer and activist

== Others ==
- Bathgate F.C., a Scottish Football League

== See also ==
- Billy Bathgate, novel by E.L. Doctorow
- Billy Bathgate (film), starring Dustin Hoffman
