= Livingston Village =

Coordinates: 55.8869°N 3.5348°W

Livingston Village: Scottish Gaelic: Clachan Dhunlèibhe; Scots: Auld Leivinstoun
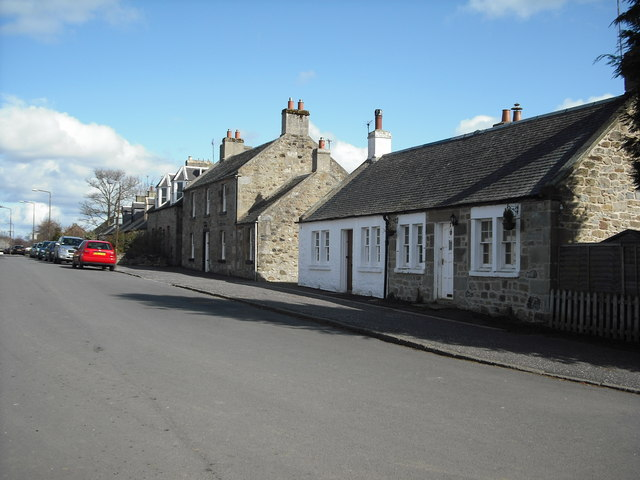
- Main Street in Livingston Village.

- Location within West Lothian
- OS grid reference: NT0367
  - Edinburgh: 13 mi (21 km) ENE
  - London: 321 mi (517 km) SSE
- Council area: West Lothian
- Lieutenancy area: West Lothian
- Country: Scotland
- Sovereign state: United Kingdom
- Post town: LIVINGSTON
- Postcode district: EH54
- Dialling code: 01506
- Police: Scotland
- Fire: Scottish
- Ambulance: Scottish
- UK Parliament: Livingston
- Scottish Parliament: Almond Valley

Livingston Village is a village in West Lothian, dating back to the 12th century. Originally a farming village in the county of West Lothian, it is now in the heart of the town of Livingston.

== History ==
=== Pre 1962 ===
Before 1962 Livingston Village was known as Livingston and has a history dating back to the 12th century. It is first mentioned in an early 12th-century charter as Villa Levingi (Leving's town). In 1128 David I granted the newly founded Abbey of Holyrood control of the church at Livingston and its income in a charter that was witnessed by Turstani filii Levingi (Thurstan Levingsson). He built a fortified tower (Peel of Livingston) which is long since gone. The settlement that grew up around it became known as Levingstoun, Layingston and eventually fixed at Livingston. The name derives from the family name Leving who controlled the area until dying out in 1512. The home of the family was a large Scottish tower house, Livingston Peel. From 1512 until 1671 the house was occupied by The Murrays of Elibank. In the late 17th century the Peel was demolished and replaced by a house called Livingston Place and it passed from the Murray family to the Cunningham family. It was acquired by the Earl of Rosebery in 1828 and demolished in 1840.

The Earls of Callendar and the Earls of Linlithgow bear the family name Livingston, and trace their lineage back through Thurstan of Levingston to his father Leving of Levingstoun. One genealogy traces it further back to a Baron de Leving who is believed to have accompanied St. Margaret from her birthplace in Hungary, her presence in Edward the Confessor's court in England and her exile in Scotland. Other sources regard Leving as a Flemish entrepreneur.

Livingston Old Kirk, in its current form, dates from 1732 and is a fine example of plain Presbetryrian architecture of the period. It stands on the site of a pre-Reformation church which appears to have stood on the site from c.1350 to 1650.

In 1898 Livingston had several houses, a Church of Scotland Church, a United Free church and a School.

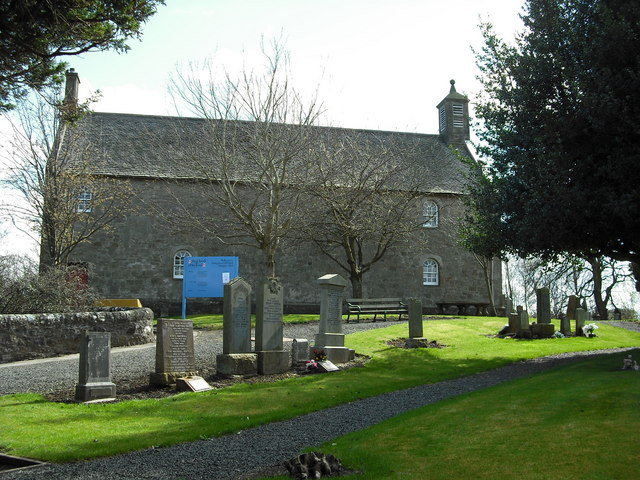
Livingston old Kirk

=== Surrounding Country Houses ===
==== Charlesfield House ====
Charlesfield House was a major country house standing just south-west of the village on the banks of the River Almond. It was designed around 1795 and completed in 1798 as the home of a Rev. Thomas Hardy. However it was sold almost immediately, to Henry Raeburn, son of the renowned Scottish portrait artist, Sir Henry Raeburn. The house contained a large number of his father’s works.

==== Howden House ====
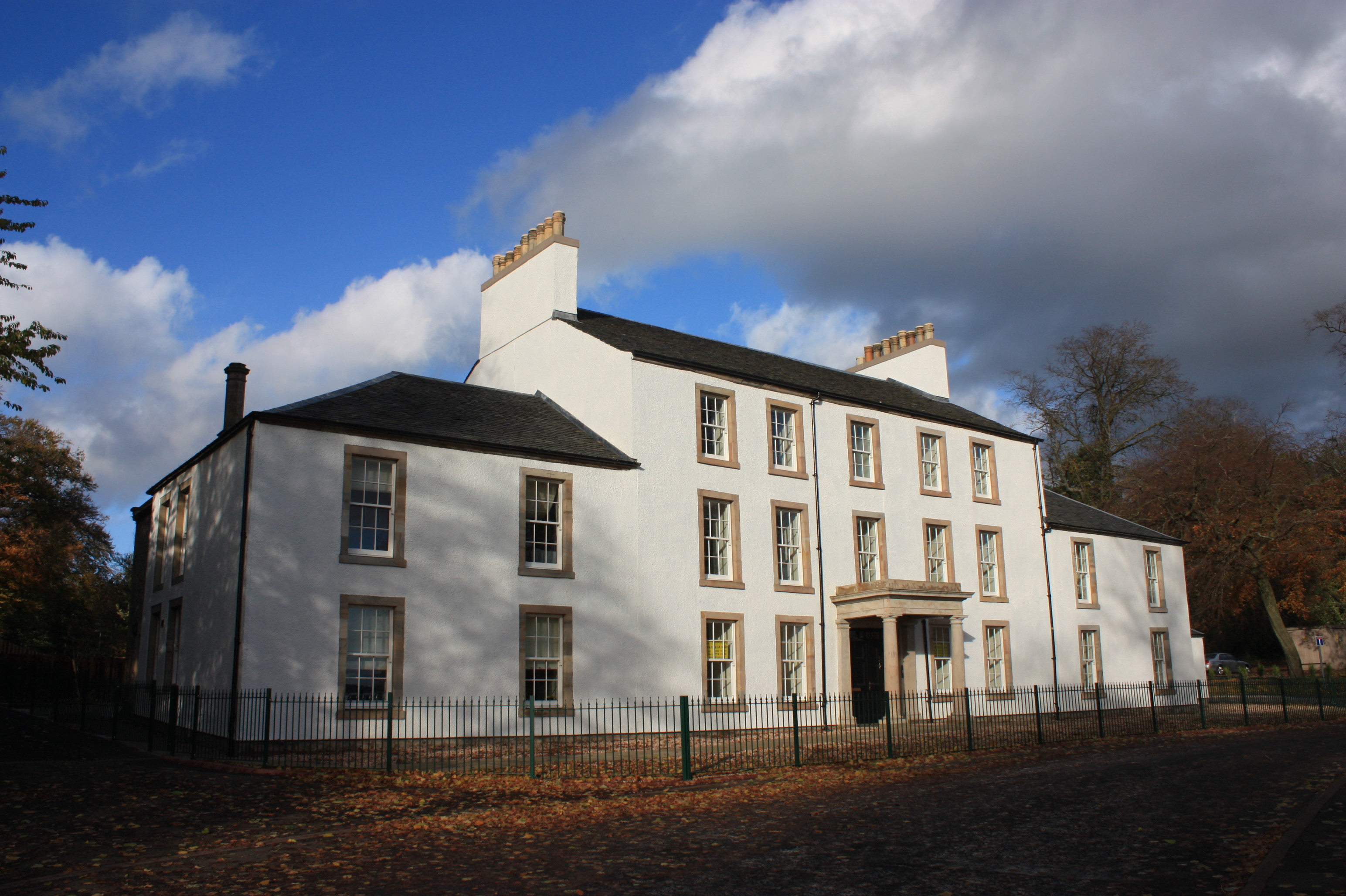
Howden House, Livingston

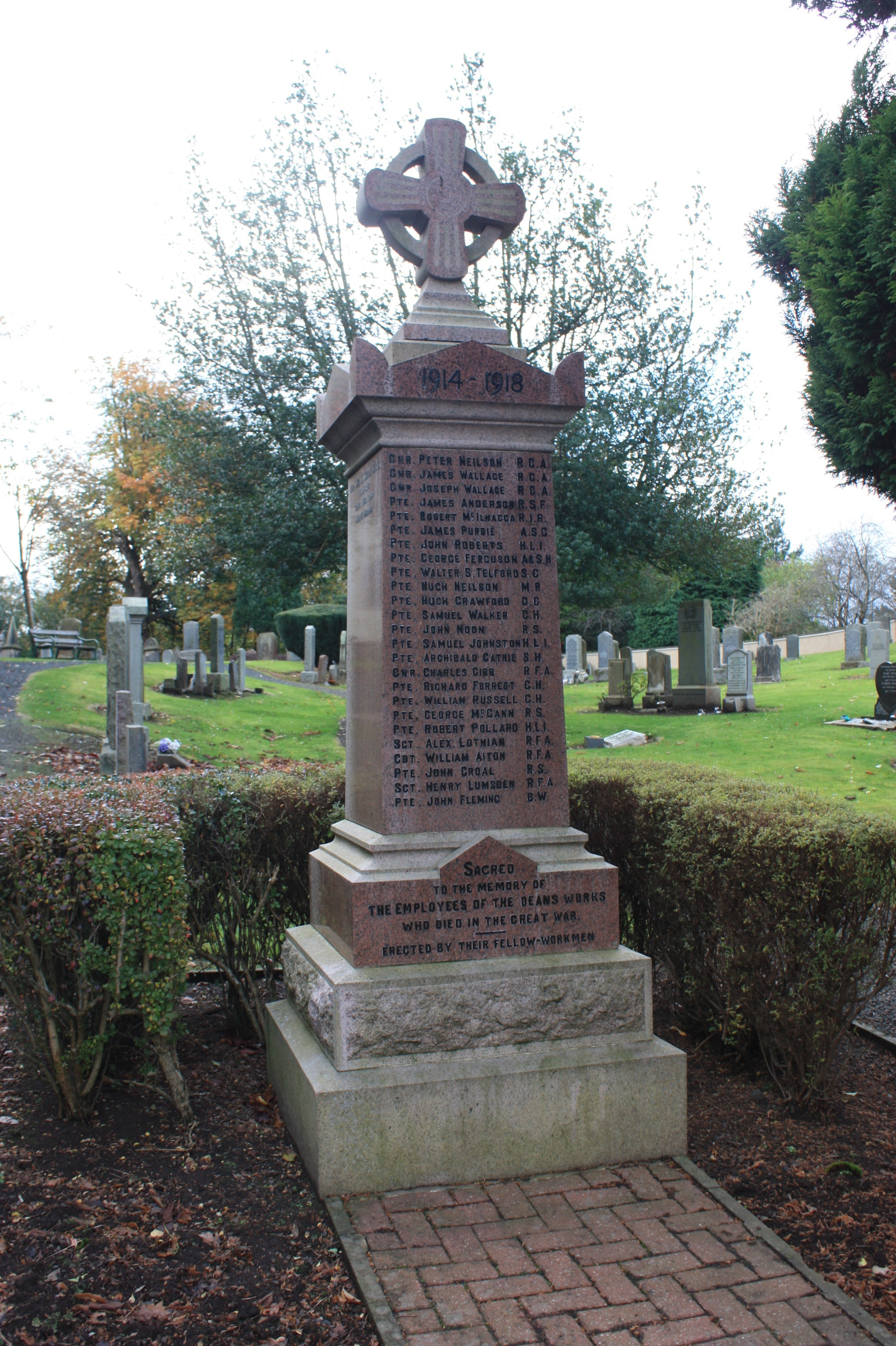
Livingston War Memorial

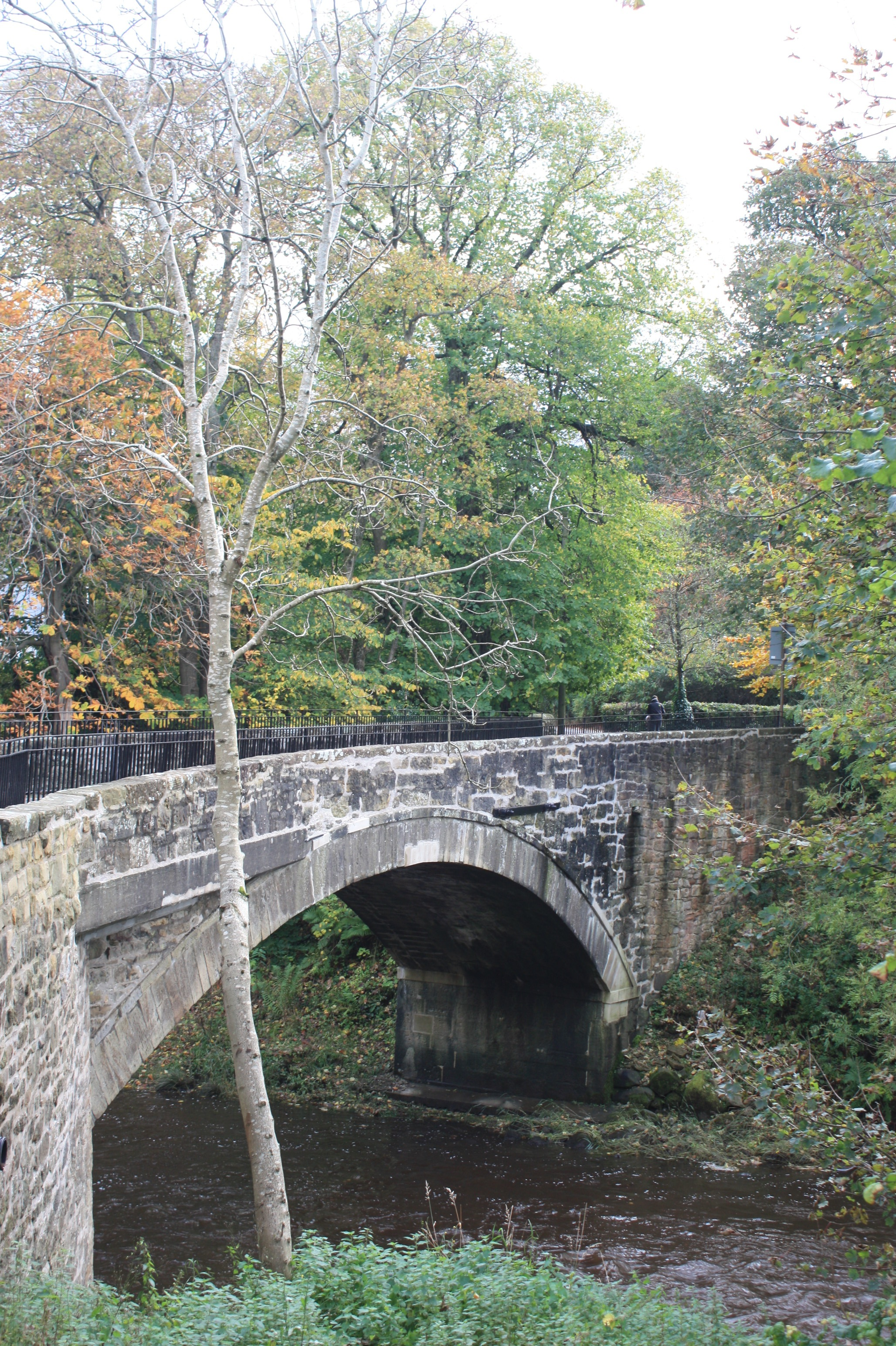
Old bridge, Livingston Village

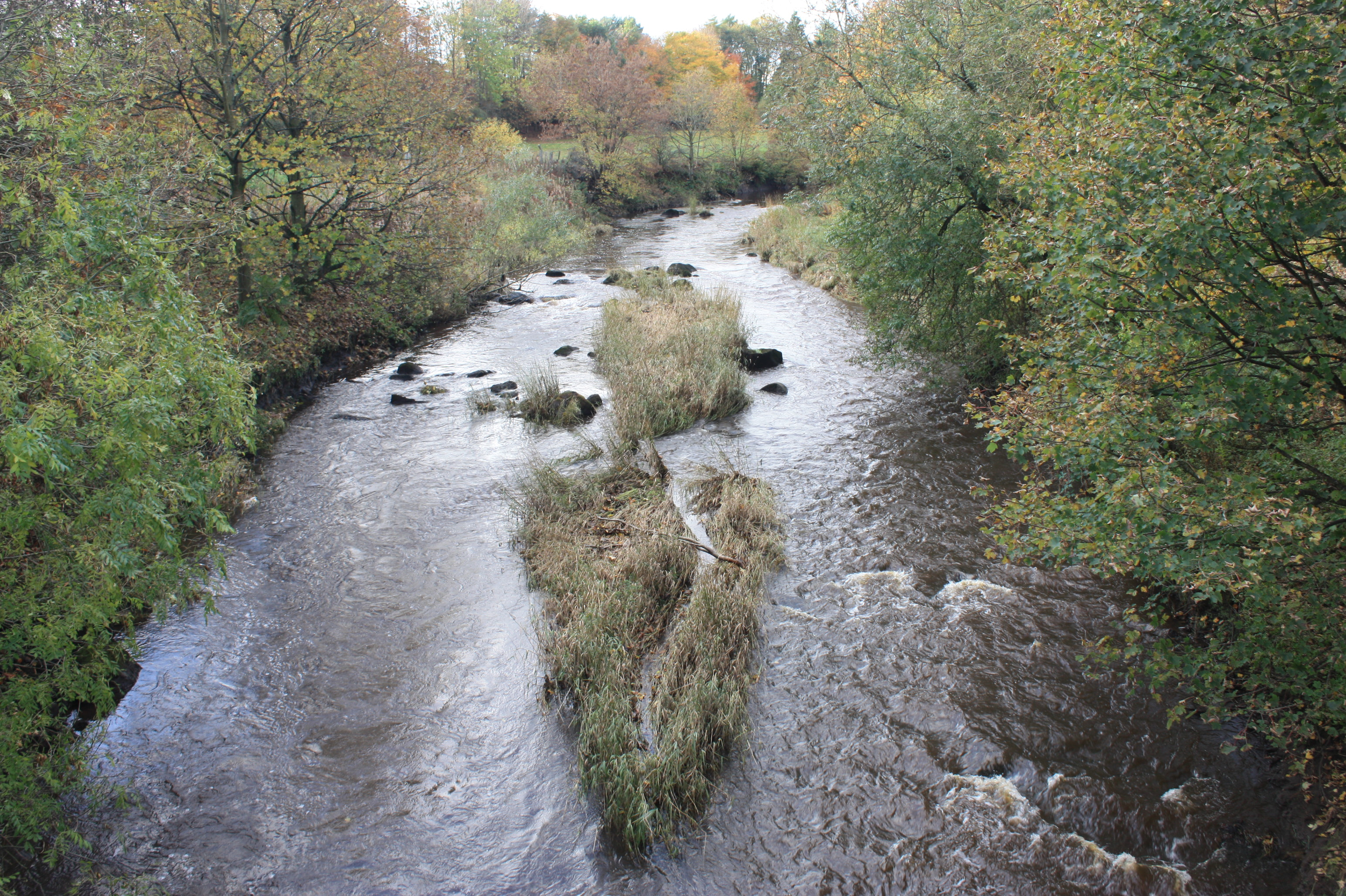
River Almond looking west from bridge in Livingston Village

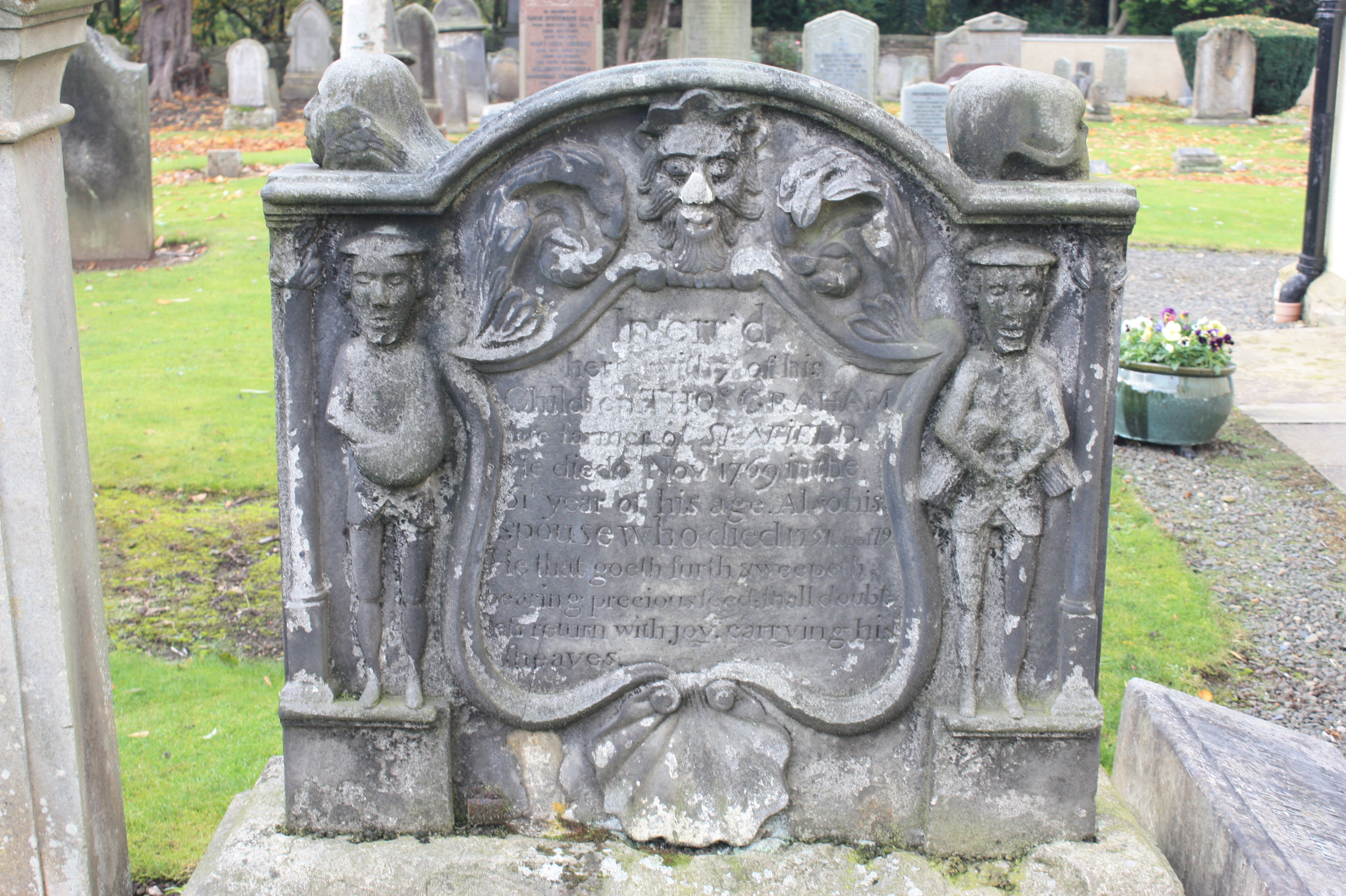
Ornate 18th-century grave in Livingston Churchyard

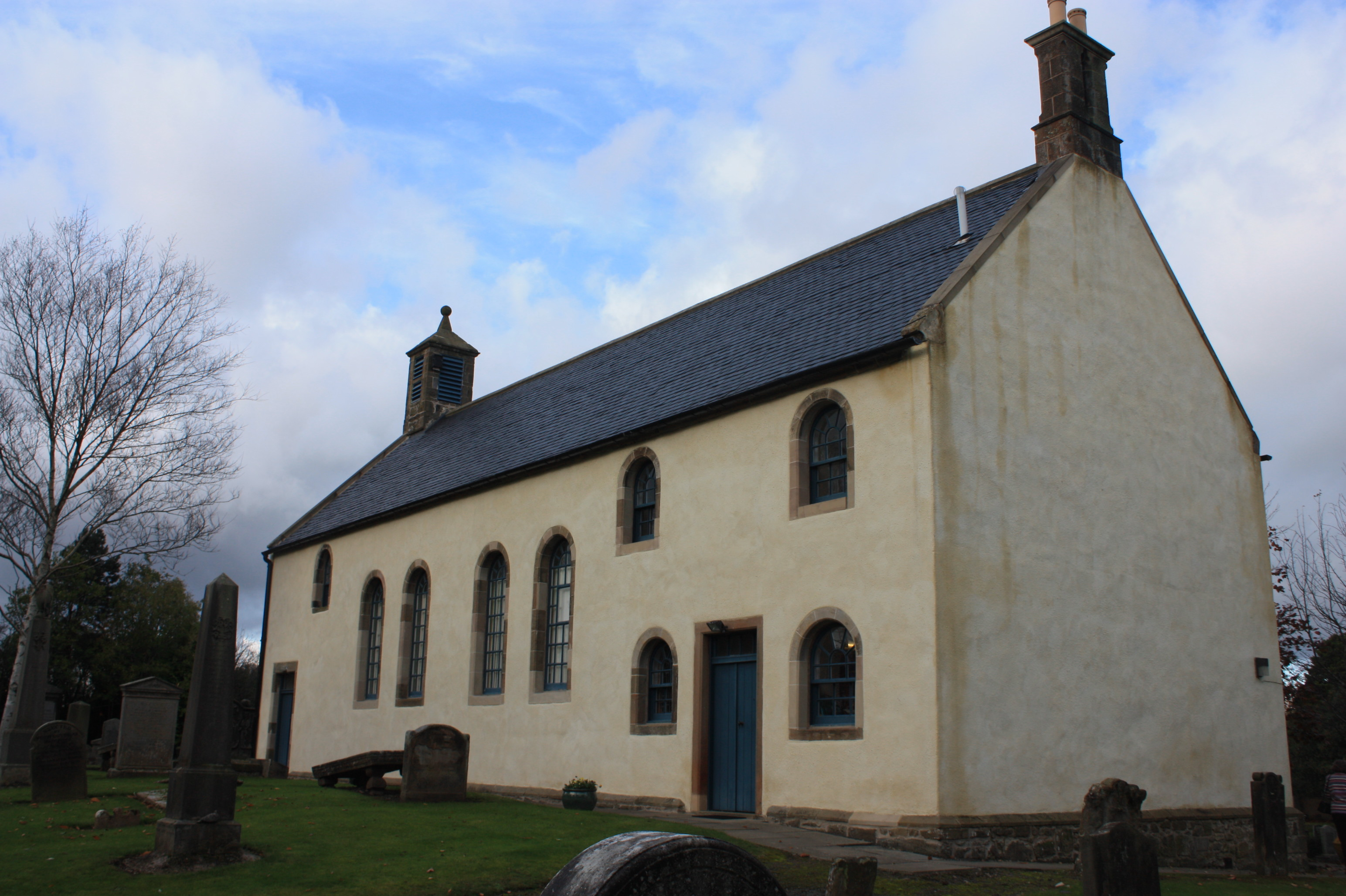
Livingston Kirk seen from the south-east

To the north-east of the village stands Howden House, also built in 1795. Its grounds form a substantial park for the town. The following year it was used for the marriage of Dr James Gregory to Isabella Macleod. Gregory was famed for his children’s cough medicine: “Gregory’s Mixture”. Latterly it was occupied by the Department of Agriculture and Fisheries. In 1964 it was converted into a community centre and its gardens given to use as a public park, with the help of a £12000 grant from the Carnegie Trust. In recent years the community facilities have condensed down to occupy the former stable block to the west and a new-build structure. The original building was converted to flats in 2013.

==== Alderstone House ====
The estate was purchased by the Kinloch family in 1556 and the current house built as a typical Scottish L-plan tower-house in 1626 by the advocate Patrick Kinloch. The grounds contain a large stone doo’cote of similar age in the grounds.

=== After 1962 ===
The new town of Livingston was built and was given the name Livingston so the old Livingston was renamed Livingston Village to distinguish it from the New Town. Since then the village has expanded greatly and now contains a large amount of New Town architecture.

== Governance ==
Livingston Village is in the West Lothian council area, before 1975 it was part of Linlithgowshire. There was previously a Quango called the Livingston Development Corporation that existed from 1962 to March 1997 to build, manage and promote the New Town which included Livingston Village.

Livingston Village is covered by the Livngston North Ward in West Lothian Council and the Livingston North Local Area Committee. The Councillors are the Chair Andrew Miller (SNP), John Cochrane (Action to Save St John's Hospital), Robert De Bold (SNP) and Bruce Ferrie (Labour).

Livingston Village is part of the Almond Valley Constituency since 1999 and is represented by the Scottish National Party (SNP) Angela Constance who has held the seat since 2007 when the constituency was called Livingston. Livingston Village is part of the Livingston UK Parliament constituency since 1983 for which the SNP's Hannah Bardell was elected MP in May 2015, unseating the incumbent Labour MP Graeme Morrice.

Prior to Brexit in 2020 it was part of the Scotland European Parliament constituency.

== Recreation and Sport ==
Almondvale Stadium the home of Livingston F.C. who play in the Scottish Premier League is on the edge of the village.

== Transport ==
Livingston Village was served by Livingston Station on the Edinburgh to Bathgate Line which opened in 1849 and closed in 1948. The area around this station used to be known as Livingston Station and is now known as Deans. A new station opened in 1986 about 1 km east of the original site and is called Livingston North railway station. Another station to the south: Newpark railway station also served the village. This has been replaced by Livingston South railway station about 2 km east.

The M8 Motorway is nearby and the A705 run parallel to the village. The nearest airport is Edinburgh Airport.

== See also ==
- Cumbernauld Village
- The Village, East Kilbride
- Milton Keynes Village
