= Bathgate railway station (disambiguation) =

Bathgate railway station is a railway station close to the site of Bathgate Middle Junction, constructed as part of the Airdrie-Bathgate Rail Link

Bathgate railway station may also refer to one of these closed stations in Bathgate, Scotland:

- Bathgate railway station (1986)
- Bathgate Upper railway station on the Edinburgh and Bathgate Railway
- Bathgate Lower railway station on the Bathgate Branch of the Monkland Railways
