= Robert Taylor incident =

1979 UFO incident in West Lothian, Scotland

Dechmont Woods near Livingston in Scotland

In ufology, the Taylor Incident, a.k.a. Livingston Incident or Dechmont Woods Encounter, is the name given to a claimed 1979 sighting of an unidentified flying object (UFO) by forester Robert "Bob" Taylor on Dechmont Law in Livingston, West Lothian, Scotland.

When Taylor returned home from a trip to Dechmont Law dishevelled, his clothes torn and with grazes to his chin and thighs, he claimed he had encountered a "flying dome" which tried to pull him aboard. Due to his injuries, the police recorded the matter as a common assault and the incident is popularly promoted as the "only example of an alien sighting becoming the subject of a criminal investigation".

== Taylor's story ==
According to Taylor, a forestry worker for the Livingston Development Corporation, on 9 November 1979 he parked his pickup truck at the side of a road near the M8 motorway and walked along a forest path up the side of Dechmont Law with his dog, red setter Lara.

At 10 a.m., he rounded a corner in Deans Forest and saw the object. Taylor reported seeing what he described as a "flying dome" or a large circular sphere approximately 7 yards (6.4 m; 21 ft) in diameter, hovering above the forest floor in a clearing about 530 yards (1,590 ft; 480 m) away from his truck. Taylor described the object as made of "a dark metallic material with a rough texture like sandpaper", and featuring an outer rim "set with small propellers".

Taylor claims he experienced a foul odour "like burning brakes" and that smaller spheres "similar to sea mines" seized him and were dragging him in the direction of the larger object when he lost consciousness. According to Taylor, when he later awoke, his dog was barking furiously and the objects were gone, but he could not start his truck, so he walked back to his home in Livingston. He lived at 4 Broomyknowe Drive, at Livingston Station (now Deans, West Lothian), near Livingston United F.C. He had been a forestry worker for 15 years.

Later he moved to Berrydale Road in Blairgowrie and Rattray. Livingston Development Corporation (LDC) agreed to add a commemorative plaque, installed in January 1992.

== Police investigation ==
Taylor's wife, Mary, reported that when he arrived home on foot, he appeared dishevelled and muddy with torn clothing and ripped trousers. She called the police and a doctor, who treated him for grazes to his chin and thighs. His wife telephoned Malcolm Drummond, the head of the Livingston Development Corporation. Police accompanied Taylor to the site where he claimed he had received his injuries. They found "ladder-shaped marks" in the ground where Taylor said he had seen the large spherical object and other marks that Taylor said had been made by the smaller mine-like objects. Police recorded the matter as a criminal assault.

== Ufologists ==
The story drew attention from ufologists, and Taylor became notable among UFO enthusiasts as having experienced "the only UFO sighting that was subject to a criminal investigation". Ufologist and author Malcolm Robinson accepts Taylor's story, saying he believes "it could be one of the few genuine cases of a UFO encounter".

== Sceptical reception ==
In 1979, UFO sceptic Steuart Campbell visited the scene of the incident with the police. Campbell was convinced that a simple explanation would be found. On his second visit to the site, he stated that he had observed some PVC pipes in an adjoining field. He discovered that the local water authority had laid a cable duct within 100 m (330 ft) of the clearing. He came to the conclusion that stacks of pipes might have been stored in the clearing and were responsible for the ground markings.

Patricia Hannaford, founder of the Edinburgh University UFO Research Society and a qualified physician, advised Campbell on medical aspects of the case. She suggested that Taylor's collapse was an isolated attack of temporal lobe epilepsy, with the reported objects explainable as resultant hallucinations. Symptoms such as Taylor's previous meningitis, his report of a strong smell which nobody else could detect, his headache, dry throat, paralysis of his legs, and period of unconsciousness suggested this cause.

Steve Donnelly, a physicist and editor for The Skeptic, also considered the incident to be explained by an epileptic attack. Campbell suggested Taylor's attack might have been stimulated by a mirage of Venus.

Local businessman Phill Fenton published a report in 2013, speculating that Taylor "may have suffered a mini-stroke and been exposed to harmful chemicals which left him confused and disoriented" and that "the UFO he believes he saw could have been a saucer-shaped water tower nearby".

== See also ==
- List of UFO sightings
- UFO sightings in United Kingdom
