= Livingston railway station =

Former railway station in Scotland

Coordinates: 55.8967°N 3.5629°W

Livingston
- The site of Livingston station, marked by the overbridge, looking east in July 2007

General information
- Location: Livingston, West Lothian; Scotland
- Platforms: 2

Other information
- Status: Disused

History
- Original company: Edinburgh and Bathgate Railway
- Pre-grouping: North British Railway
- Post-grouping: LNER

Key dates
- 12 November 1849: Opened as Livingston
- December 1875: Renamed as Livingstone
- July 1925: Name reverted to Livingston
- 1 November 1948: Closed
Location

Livingston railway station was a railway station which served the village of Livingston and the community of Livingston Station, both of which were later amalgamated into the new town of Livingston in West Lothian, Scotland. It was located on the Edinburgh and Bathgate Railway. The area close to the station now known as Deans and the old Livingston is now called Livingston Village.

== History ==
The original Livingston station was opened by the Edinburgh and Bathgate Railway on 12 November 1849. Between December 1875 and July 1925 its name was spelt "Livingstone". British Railways closed the station on 1 November 1948. This station was situated 32 chains west of the present Livingston North station. The station had a single siding on the down line which served its goods yard. 19 chains west of the station, a tramway serving a limeworks crossed under the main railway, and formed an interchange with a set of sidings to transfer the traffic to rail. Also at this location was the West Lothian oil works.

== Services ==
| Preceding station | Historical railways | Following station |
|---|---|---|
| Bathgate (Upper); Line open; station closed | Edinburgh and Bathgate Railway; North British Railway | Uphall; Line and station open |
