= Drumgelloch railway station =

Railway station in North Lanarkshire, Scotland

Drumgelloch Scottish Gaelic: Druim Gailleach
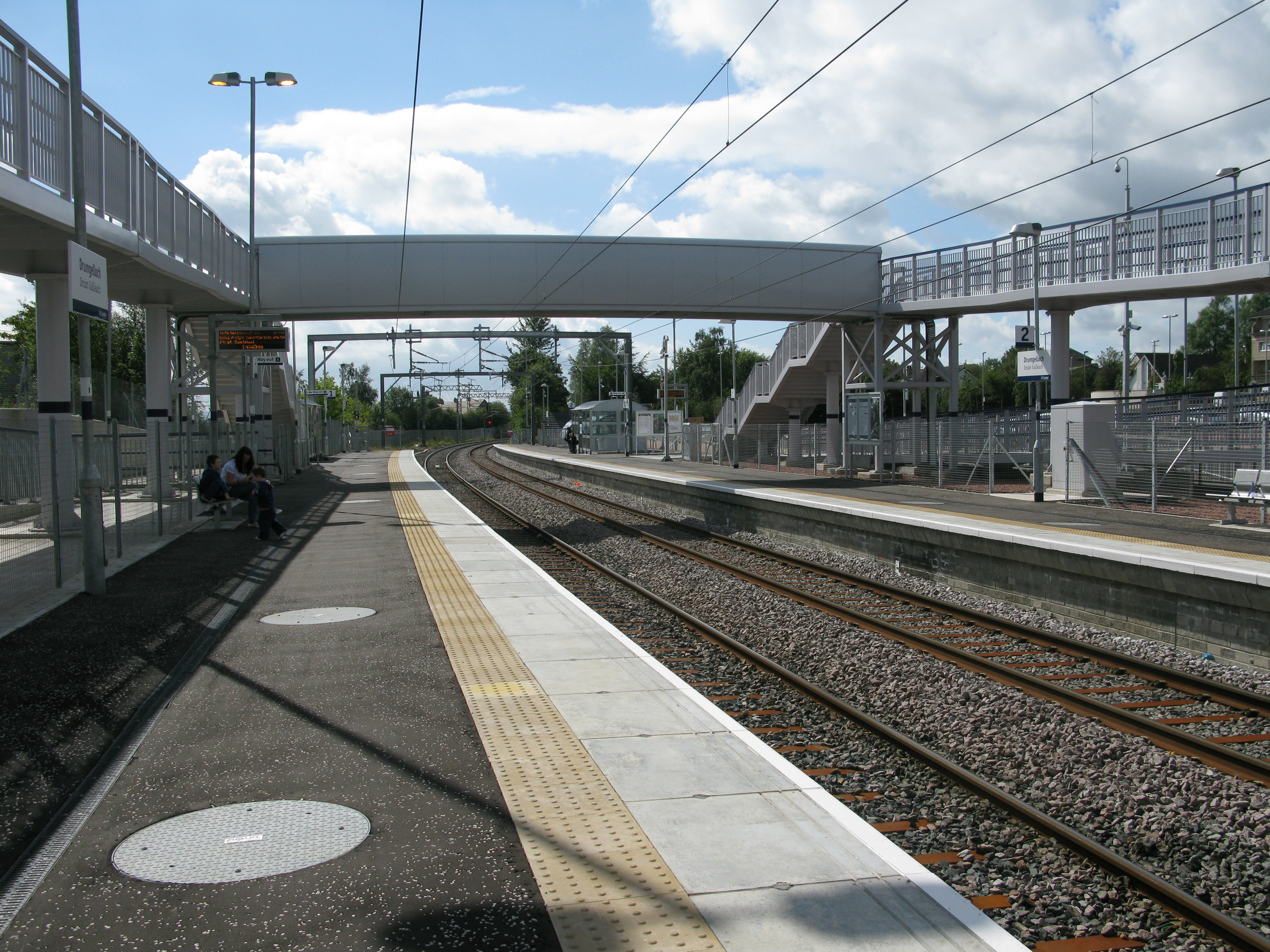
- Drumgelloch railway station looking towards Airdrie

General information
- Location: Airdrie, North Lanarkshire; Scotland, United Kingdom
- Coordinates: 55.867°N 3.9501°W
- Grid reference: NS781655
- Managed by: ScotRail
- Platforms: 2

Other information
- Station code: DRU

History
- Original company: Bathgate and Coatbridge Railway
- Pre-grouping: North British Railway
- Post-grouping: LNER

Key dates
- 11 August 1862: Opened as Clarkston
- 8 June 1953: Renamed Clarkston (Lanarks)
- 9 January 1956: Closed
- 6 March 2011: Reopened as Drumgelloch

Passengers
- 2020/21: ▼35,794
- 2021/22: ▲0.163 million
- 2022/23: ▲0.224 million
- 2023/24: ▲0.274 million
- 2024/25: ▲0.276 million
Location
Notes
- Passenger statistics from the Office of Rail and Road

Drumgelloch railway station is a railway station serving the east of Airdrie, North Lanarkshire, Scotland. It is located 550 metres (600 yd) east of the 1989 station on the former Bathgate and Coatbridge Railway, on the site of the former Clarkston railway station. The station previously closed in 1956.

== History ==
The first station on the site was opened on 11 August 1862 by the Bathgate and Coatbridge Railway, and was named Clarkston. It was renamed Clarkston (Lanarks) on 8 June 1953 by British Railways, who closed it on 9 January 1956.

In 2005, the Scottish Executive announced that the closed section of line between the 1989 Drumgelloch station and Bathgate would be rebuilt as a double-tracked electrified railway termed the Airdrie–Bathgate rail link. This resulted in the closure of the 1989 Drumgelloch station to be replaced by the new station 550 metres (1,800 ft) to the east on the site of the former Clarkston station. When the 1989 station opened, although in the Clarkston area, it took the name Drumgelloch to avoid confusion with the Clarkston station on the East Kilbride Line.

It connects the Edinburgh–Bathgate line at Bathgate to the North Clyde Line at Airdrie and opens up a fourth rail link between Glasgow and Edinburgh.

The 2010 station is provided with a 336-space car park including 18 spaces for less able travellers and a dedicated area for cyclists.

The station did not open for passenger traffic when the line opened on 12 December 2010 and passengers wishing to start or complete their journey at Drumgelloch initially had to transfer to a replacement bus service at Airdrie. The station finally reopened on 6 March 2011.

== Services ==
=== 2010/2011 (from 12 December 2010) ===
Following the opening of the line between Airdrie and Bathgate, the basic off-peak daytime service is:

- 2tph - Helensburgh Central to/from Edinburgh Waverley
- 2tph - Milngavie to/from Edinburgh Waverley

The evening service is:

- 2tph - Helensburgh Central to/from Edinburgh Waverley

The Sunday service is:

- 2tph - Helensburgh Central to/from Edinburgh Waverley

This is subject to sufficient Class 380 being introduced into service to allow the cascade of the Class 334 from the Ayrshire Coast Line to operate the new service.

Preceding station	National Rail	Following station
Caldercruix	ScotRail; North Clyde Line	Airdrie
	Historical railways	
Plains; Line open; Station closed	Bathgate and Coatbridge Railway; North British Railway	Airdrie; Line and Station open
