= Coatbridge Sunnyside railway station =

Railway station in North Lanarkshire, Scotland

Coatbridge Sunnyside
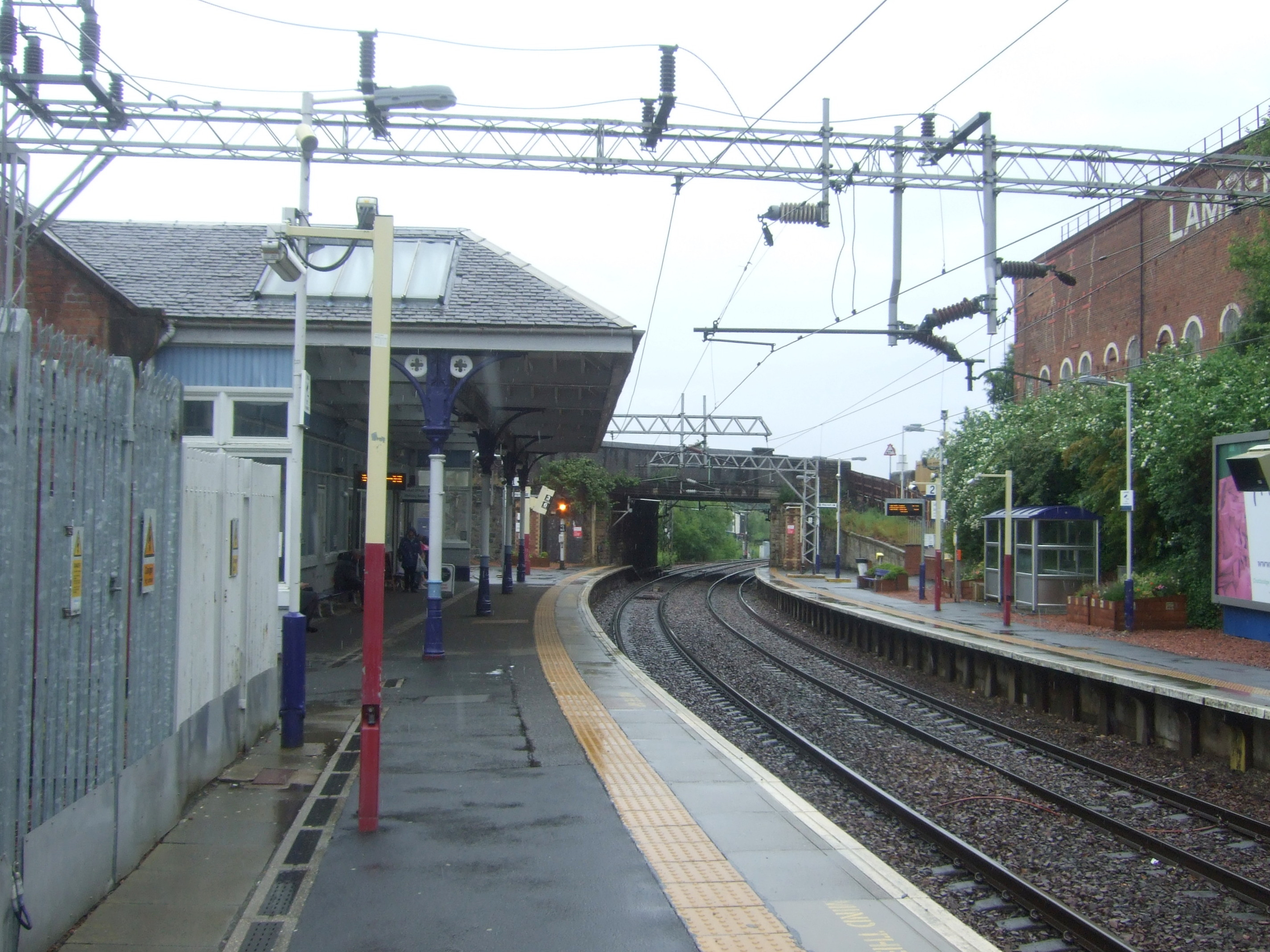
- The station in 2017, looking west towards Blairhill

General information
- Location: Coatbridge, North Lanarkshire; Scotland
- Coordinates: 55.8669°N 4.0281°W
- Grid reference: NS731656
- Managed by: ScotRail
- Platforms: 2

Other information
- Station code: CBS

Key dates
- 1871: Opened

Passengers
- 2020/21: ▼60,374
- 2021/22: ▲0.266 million
- 2022/23: ▲0.359 million
- 2023/24: ▲0.436 million
- 2024/25: ▲0.472 million

Listed Building – Category B
- Designated: 19 September 1985
- Reference no.: LB23003
Location
Notes
- Passenger statistics from the Office of Rail and Road

Coatbridge Sunnyside railway station serves the town of Coatbridge in North Lanarkshire, Scotland. The railway station is managed by ScotRail and is located on the North Clyde Line, 9 miles (14 km) east of Glasgow Queen Street.

== History ==
It was opened by the North British Railway in February 1871, as the terminus of their Coatbridge Branch from Glasgow and was linked from the outset to both the Monkland and Kirkintilloch Railway lines to Whifflet and Gartsherrie Junction and also the Bathgate and Coatbridge Railway line to Airdrie, Bathgate and Edinburgh Waverley. All of these other than the northern portion of the M&KR to Gunnie yard and Gartsherrie remain in use today, though the Whifflet line has no timetabled passenger service and the route east of Airdrie was disused for more than 30 years prior to re-opening to passenger traffic in 2010.

=== Accidents and incidents ===
- On 30 September 1907, a passenger train collided with a light engine at the station. One person was killed and 43 were injured.
- On 6 May 2022, an empty coaching stock train was derailed at the station. No one was injured in the accident.

== Facilities ==
The station has a car park with 120 spaces and a cafe located on the covered platform.

== Services ==
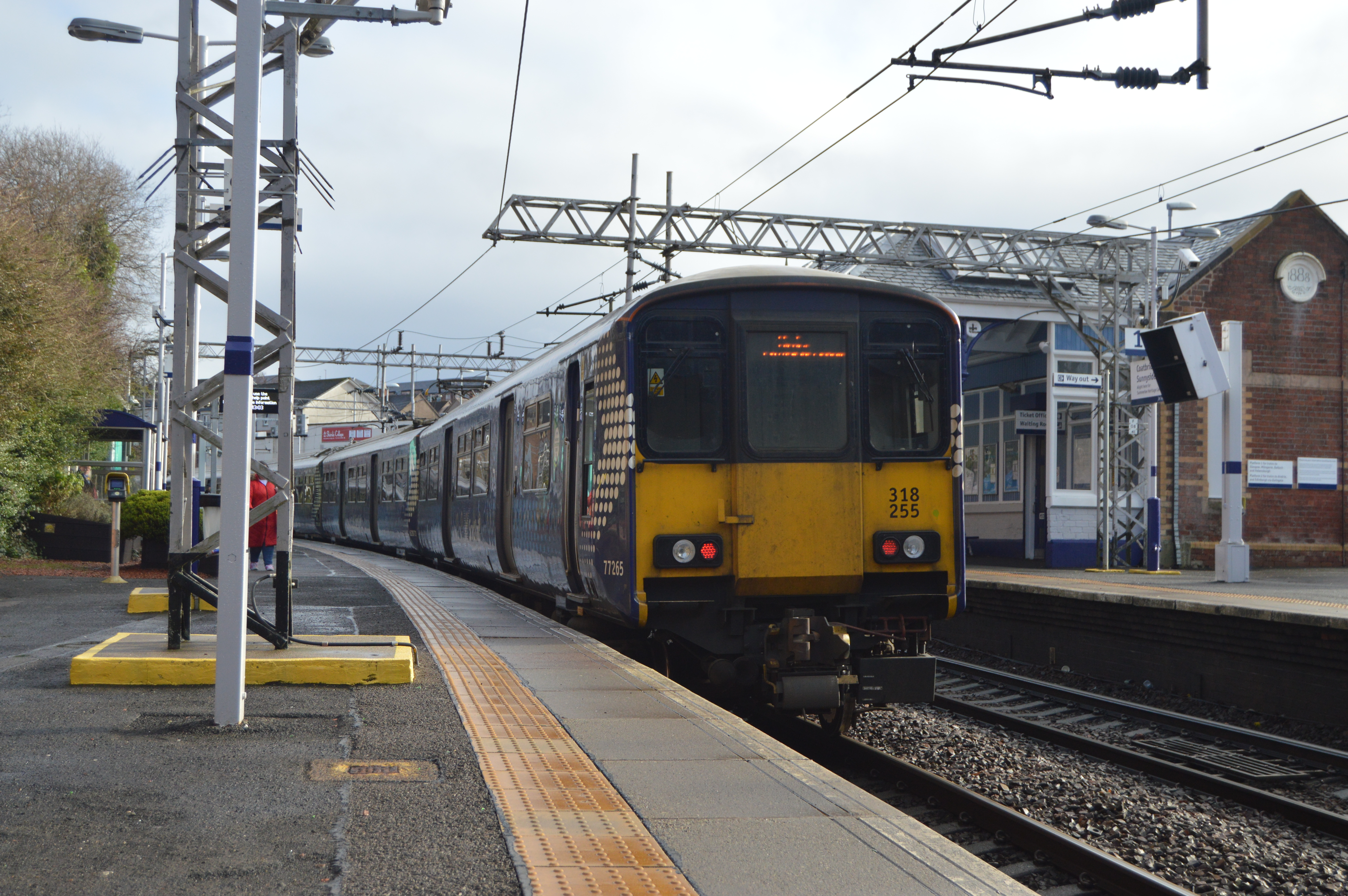
A Class 318 departing the station with a service for Airdrie

Monday to Saturday daytimes:

- 2 Half-hourly services towards Edinburgh Waverley (both services are limited stops)
- Half-hourly service towards Airdrie
- Half-hourly service towards Balloch via Glasgow Queen Street Low Level
- Half-hourly service towards Helensburgh Central via Glasgow Queen Street Low Level
- Half-hourly service towards Milngavie via Glasgow Queen Street Low Level

Evening services are as follows:

- Half-hourly service towards Airdrie
- Half-hourly service towards Edinburgh Waverley
- Half-hourly service towards Balloch via Glasgow Queen Street Low Level
- Half-hourly service towards Helensburgh Central via Glasgow Queen Street Low Level

Sunday services are as follows:

- Half-hourly service towards Edinburgh Waverley
- Half-hourly service towards Helensburgh Central

Preceding station	National Rail	Following station
Coatdyke	ScotRail; North Clyde Line	Blairhill
