= Coatdyke railway station =

Railway station in North Lanarkshire, Scotland

Coatdyke
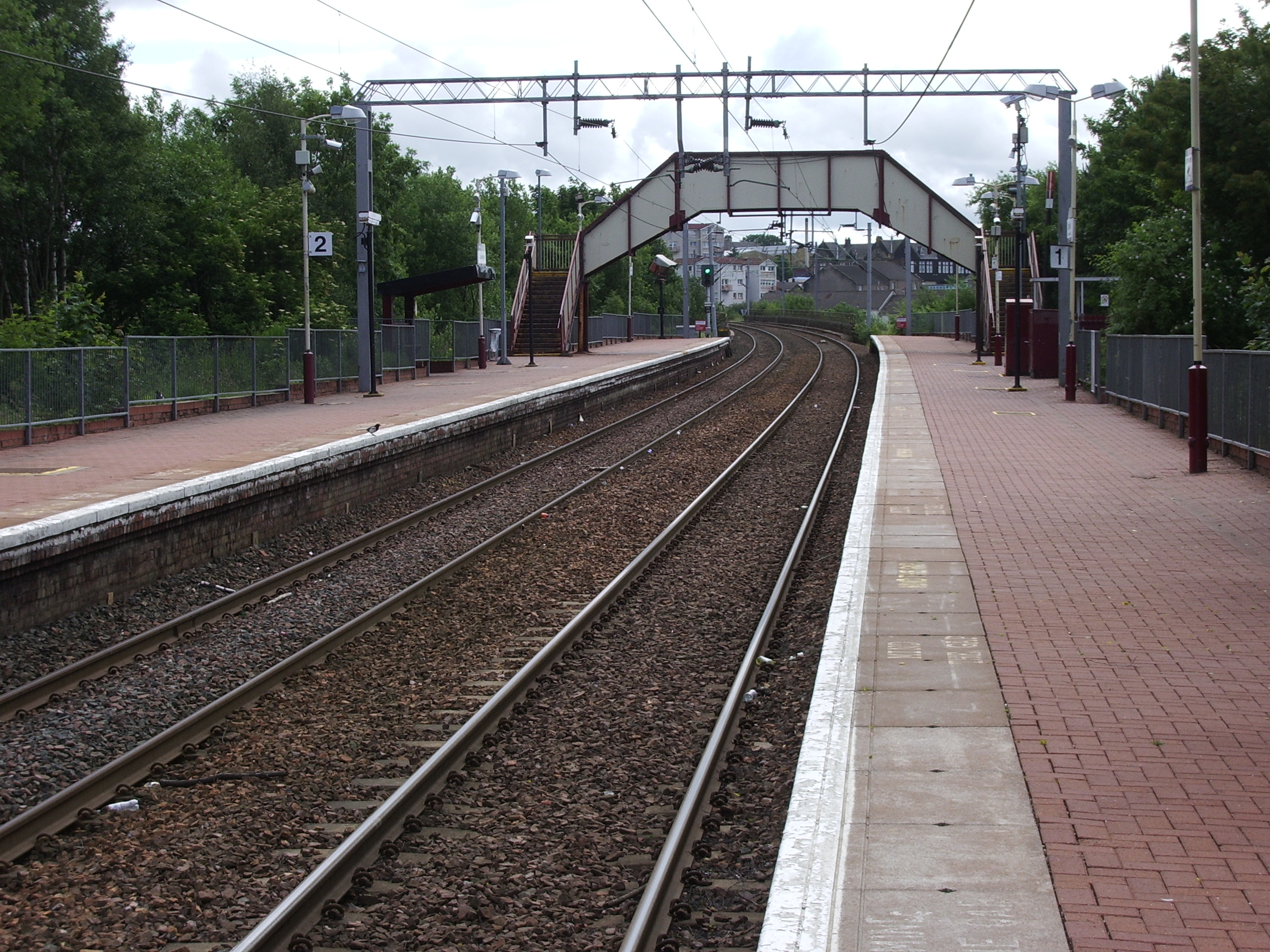
- Coatdyke railway station

General information
- Location: Quarry Street/Riddell Street Coatbridge, North Lanarkshire; Scotland
- Coordinates: 55.8644°N 4.0050°W
- Grid reference: NS746652
- Managed by: ScotRail
- Transit authority: SPT
- Platforms: 2

Other information
- Station code: COA

History
- Original company: Bathgate and Coatbridge Railway
- Pre-grouping: North British Railway
- Post-grouping: LNER

Key dates
- 1 February 1871: Opened

Passengers
- 2020/21: ▼35,562
- 2021/22: ▲0.128 million
- 2022/23: ▲0.184 million
- 2023/24: ▲0.222 million
- 2024/25: ▲0.236 million
Location
Notes
- Passenger statistics from the Office of Rail and Road

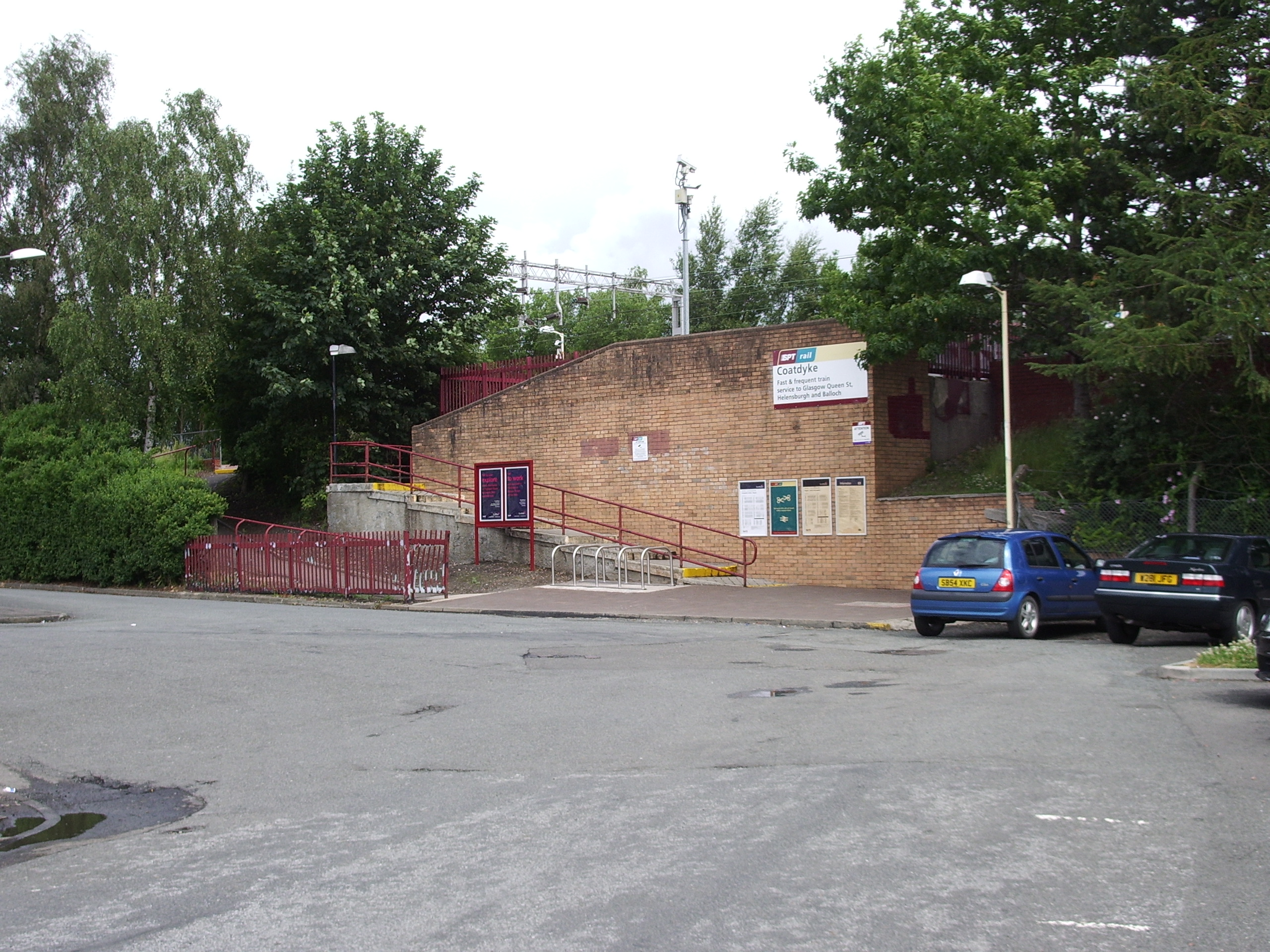
Coatdyke railway station entrance

Coatdyke railway station is situated on Quarry Street/Riddell Street in the Cliftonville area of the town of Coatbridge and 10 miles (16 km) east of Glasgow Queen Street. It is the closest railway station to Coatbridge College and Monklands Hospital.

== History ==
The station was opened as part of the Bathgate and Coatbridge Railway on 1 February 1871. The station now has no structures other than simple shelters. The ticket hall that was built when the Airdrie-Helensburgh line was electrified in 1960 was demolished in the early 1990s. Similar structures, built in the same style, still survive at Easterhouse and Airdrie stations.

== Services ==
Monday to Saturday daytimes:

- Half-hourly service towards Edinburgh Waverley
- Half-hourly service towards Airdrie
- Half-hourly service towards Balloch via Glasgow Queen Street Low Level
- Half-hourly service towards Helensburgh Central via Glasgow Queen Street Low Level (as of 2019 this service does not always call at Shettleston, Cartyne and Easterhouse. Passengers for these stations use the half-hourly service towards Balloch instead.)

Evening services are as follows:

- Half-hourly service towards Airdrie
- Half-hourly service towards Balloch via Glasgow Queen Street Low Level

Sunday services are as follows:

- Half-hourly service towards Edinburgh Waverley
- Half-hourly service towards Helensburgh Central

Preceding station	National Rail	Following station
Airdrie	ScotRail; North Clyde Line	Coatbridge Sunnyside
	Historical railways	
Airdrie; Line and Station open	North British Railway; Bathgate and Coatbridge Railway	To Greenside Junction with Monkland and Kirkintilloch Railway; Line open

== Facilities ==
There is a small car park in the street outside the station. This station is unstaffed.
