= Bathgate railway station (1986) =

Disused railway station in Bathgate, West Lothian

Bathgate (1986)
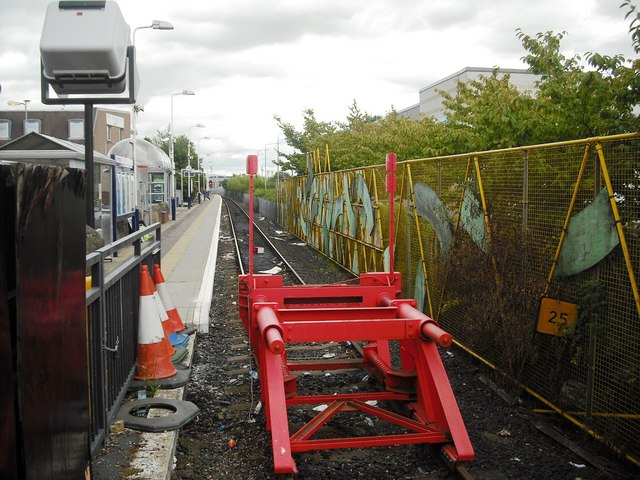
- Bathgate station in 2010.

General information
- Location: Bathgate, West Lothian; Scotland
- Coordinates: 55.8993°N 3.6405°W
- Grid reference: NS974685
- Platforms: 1

Other information
- Status: Disused

History
- Original company: British Rail

Key dates
- 24 March 1986: Opened
- 16 October 2010: Closed

Passengers
- 2004/05: 0.627 million
- 2005/06: ▲0.645 million
- 2006/07: ▲0.651 million
- 2007/08: ▼0.650 million
- 2008/09: ▲0.658 million
Location
Notes
- Passenger statistics from the Office of Rail and Road

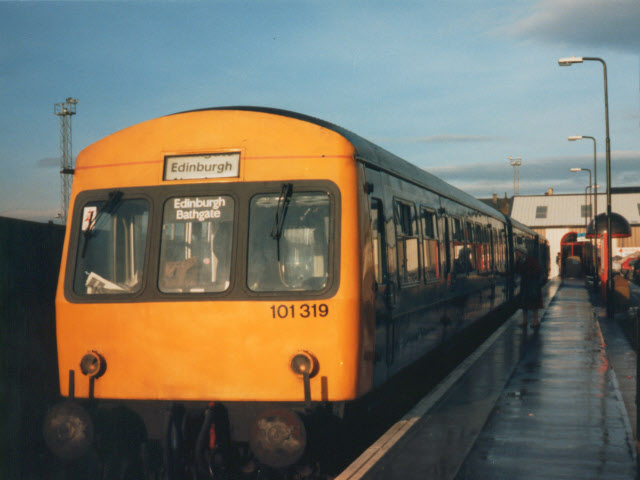
Bathgate station in 1987.

Bathgate railway station was a railway station serving Bathgate in West Lothian, Scotland. It was located at the western end of the Edinburgh-Bathgate Line. The station was 18½ miles (30 km) west of Edinburgh.

== History ==
The station was opened in 1986 to serve Bathgate when the rail service from Edinburgh was re-introduced by British Rail. Next to the station was Bathgate goods yard. The yard was used to store and unload freight trains carrying new cars. This yard was located to the south of the present station. The goods yard – later the Bathgate car terminal – was moved slightly east in 1996 as the original site of the yard was occupied by various retail outlets.

The 1986 station was sited on the location of the original Bathgate station, which became the town's goods station when Bathgate Upper opened (see link to OS 25-inch 1854 map).

In 2005, the Scottish Executive declared that in line with plans to upgrade the unfinished part of the A8 to motorway standard, public transport links between Glasgow and Edinburgh must also improve. The closed section of line between Drumgelloch station and Bathgate would be rebuilt as a double tracked electrified railway, termed the Airdrie-Bathgate Rail Link.

This resulted in the closure of this station to be replaced by a new station to the south east on the former Edinburgh and Bathgate Railway.

== Closure ==
On 16 October 2010, the station was closed at the end of the day's service, with the new Bathgate station opening on Monday 18 October.

== Service ==
At the time of closure in 2010, there was a half-hourly service from Bathgate to Edinburgh on Monday to Saturdays and an hourly service on Sundays.

| Preceding station | Historical railways | Following station |
|---|---|---|
| Terminus | First ScotRail; Edinburgh–Bathgate line | Livingston North |
