= Livingston South railway station =

Railway station in West Lothian, Scotland

Livingston South Scottish Gaelic: Baile Dhunlèibhe a Deas
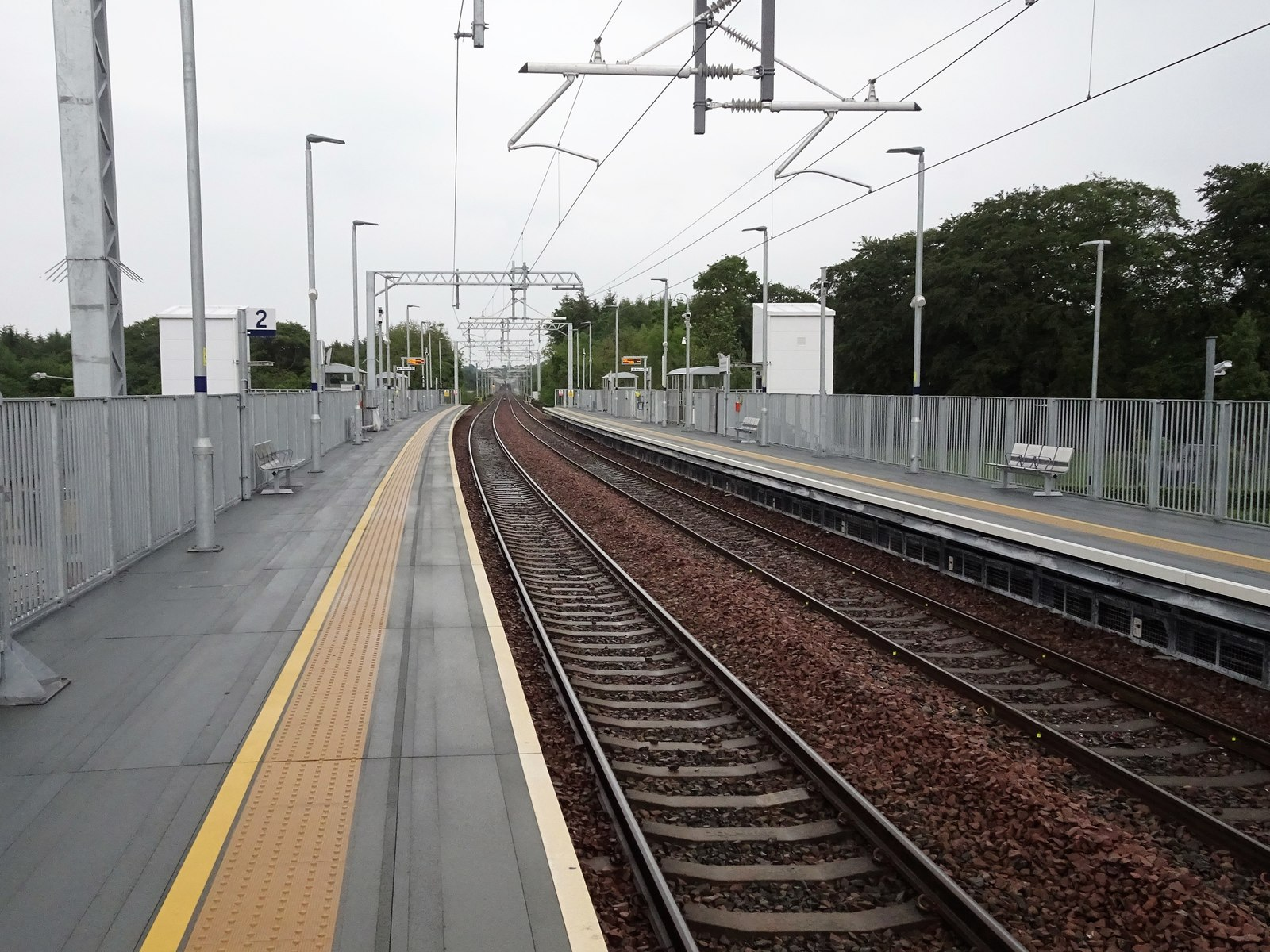
- Livingston South in 2019, following rebuilding and electrification works

General information
- Location: Livingston, West Lothian; Scotland
- Coordinates: 55.8716°N 3.5015°W
- Grid reference: NT061653
- Managed by: ScotRail
- Platforms: 2

Other information
- Station code: LVG

History
- Original company: BR Scottish Region

Key dates
- 6 October 1984: Opened

Passengers
- 2020/21: ▼45,760
- 2021/22: ▲0.152 million
- 2022/23: ▲0.206 million
- 2023/24: ▲0.302 million
- 2024/25: ▲0.370 million
Location
Notes
- Passenger statistics from the Office of Rail and Road

Livingston South railway station is one of two railway stations serving the town of Livingston in West Lothian, Scotland. It is located on the Shotts Line, 14 miles (23 km) west of Edinburgh Waverley on the way to Glasgow Central. It is managed by ScotRail, who provide all train services.

The town of Livingston also has another railway station, Livingston North, on the North Clyde Line.

== History ==
The station was opened by British Rail on 6 October 1984. The station has two platforms, connected by a subway, which was originally a cattle creep under the railway embankment at this point. The platforms were of timber construction.

In April 2018 the station underwent a £3.5 million transformation to upgrade it as part of a project to electrify the Edinburgh Waverley-Glasgow Central line.

Preceding station	National Rail	Following station
Kirknewton or Haymarket	ScotRail; Shotts Line	West Calder

== Services ==
In 2010 it was served, Monday to Saturday, by one service each hour from Glasgow Central to Edinburgh Waverley. One train a day from Edinburgh terminates at Motherwell and one starts from there. An additional hourly 'semi fast' service also now (May 2016) calls, giving the station a frequency of two trains per hour between Edinburgh and Glasgow. This latter service only calls at Haymarket en route to Edinburgh and at West Calder, Shotts & Bellshill when heading to Glasgow.

There is a limited Sunday service at this station to Edinburgh and Glasgow (six trains each way per day).

The staple passenger traction on services using this station is the Class 385 EMU.
