= Drumgelloch railway station (1989) =

Closed railway station in Scotland

Drumgelloch (1989)
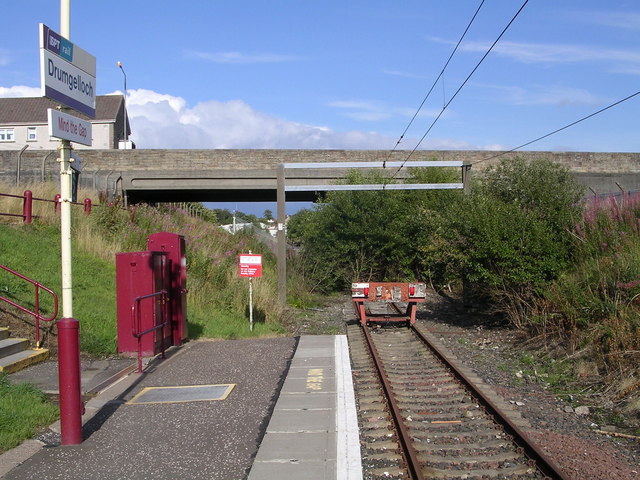
- The eastern end of the North Clyde line until 2010

General information
- Location: Airdrie, North Lanarkshire; Scotland
- Coordinates: 55.8660°N 3.9548°W
- Grid reference: NS776653
- Platforms: 1

Other information
- Status: Disused

History
- Original company: BR Scottish Region

Key dates
- 15 May 1989: Opened
- 9 May 2010: Closed

Passengers
- 2002/03: 0.113 million
- 2004/05: ▲0.131 million
- 2005/06: ▲0.173 million
- 2006/07: ▼0.165 million
- 2007/08: ▲0.168 million
Location
Notes
- Passenger statistics from the Office of Rail and Road

Drumgelloch railway station was a railway station serving Drumgelloch, an eastern suburb of Airdrie, North Lanarkshire, Scotland. The station was managed by First ScotRail and was the eastern terminus of the North Clyde Line, 20 km (12½ miles) east of Glasgow Queen Street from May 1989 to May 2010.

== History ==
The station was opened in 1989 by British Rail as the terminus of a short extension of the existing line from Airdrie, although the line to Bathgate Upper that passed through here had been closed to all traffic seven years earlier (passenger services having ceased in 1956).

The North Clyde Line has been extended eastwards beyond Drumgelloch towards Bathgate, connecting with the Edinburgh–Bathgate line. Plans for the project (termed the Airdrie–Bathgate rail link) were approved by the Scottish Parliament in March 2007 and received Royal Assent in May 2007.

Work commenced in 2008. As part of this project, the 1989 single platform Drumgelloch station was closed on 9 May 2010. A substitute bus service was provided until a new station at a new site 550 metres further east was opened on 6 March 2011.

== Services ==
There was a half-hourly service each day from Drumgelloch to Glasgow Queen Street and Helensburgh Central.

Preceding station	Historical railways	Following station
Terminus	First ScotRail; North Clyde Line	Airdrie

=== From May 2010 ===
Following closure of the station as part of the Airdrie to Bathgate project, a half-hourly bus service operated to and from Airdrie station to connect with onward services to Glasgow and Helensburgh.

=== From December 2010 ===
Upon the opening of the 2010 station services operated from the new location, initially by bus due to delays in completion as a result of the inclement weather at the end of November 2010.

== Gallery ==
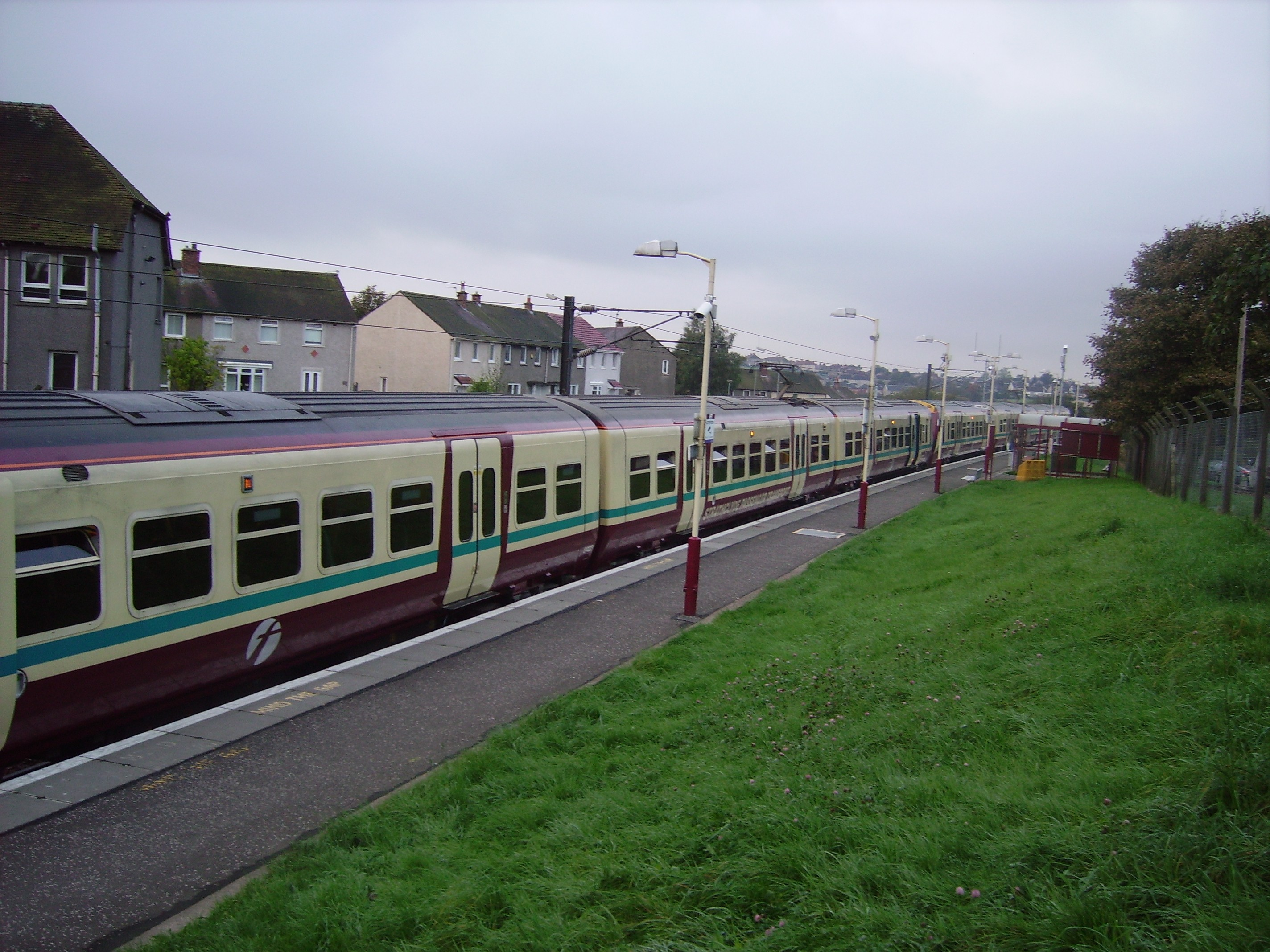
Drumgelloch station, looking towards Airdrie station, with a Class 334 departing

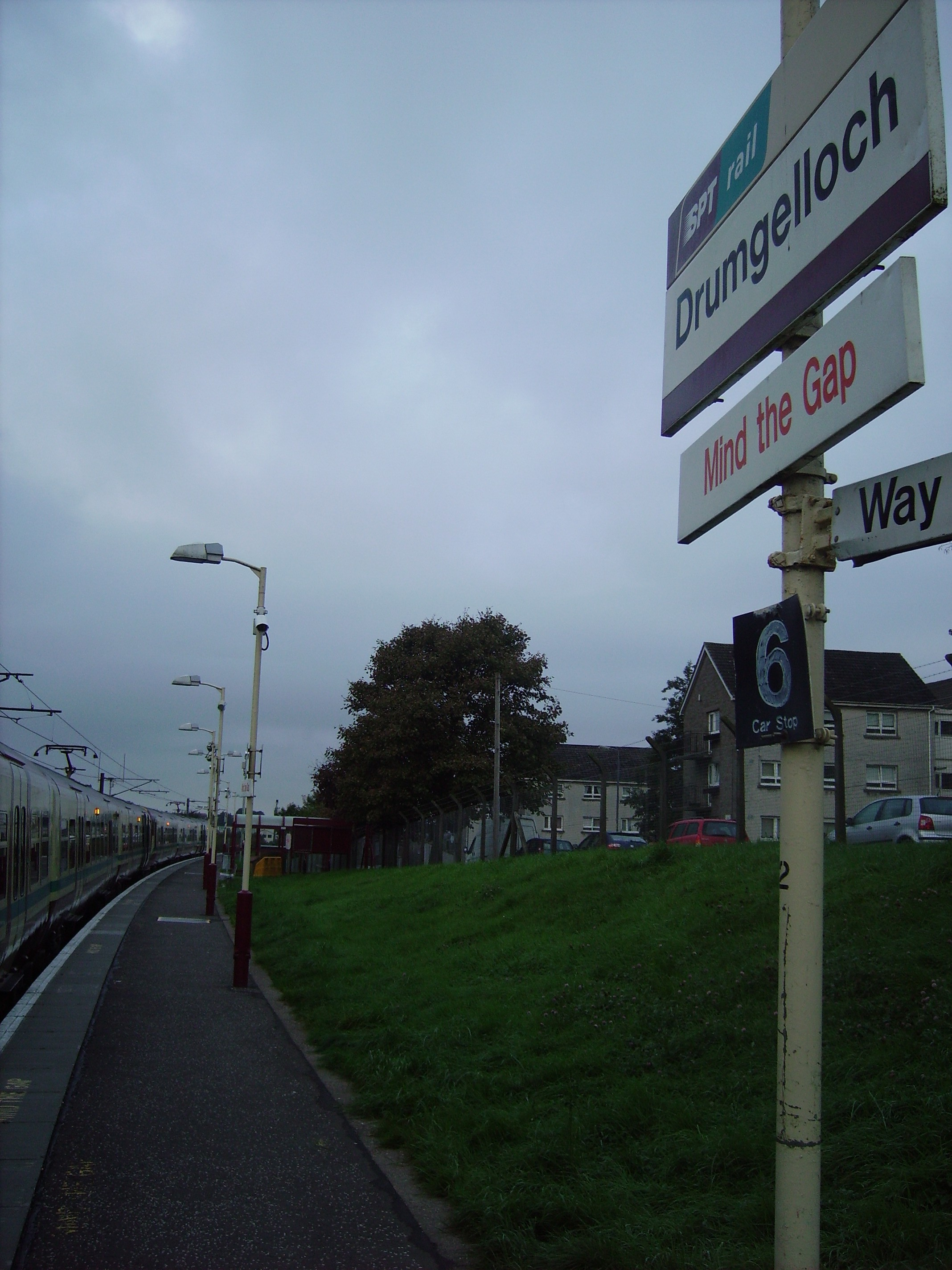
Drumgelloch station sign
