= Bathgate Industrial Park =

Industrial park in New York City, United States

Coordinates: 40.841211°N 73.899581°W

Bathgate Industrial Park is an industrial park located in the Morrisania neighborhood of the Bronx, New York City. It is south of the Cross Bronx Expressway, west of Third and Fulton Avenues (near Crotona Park), north of Claremont Parkway, and east of Washington Avenue in the district of Bronx Community Board 3.

A joint project of the Port Authority of New York and New Jersey and the New York City Economic Development Corporation (the PANYNJ leasing it from the NYCEDC) it opened in 1982 and is operated as a non profit organization. It was developed as an incentive to revitalize the South Bronx. The designation of the Bathgate Industrial Park in 1980 involved rezoning a former residential district characterized by vacant land and buildings.

The industrial park covers seven city blocks spanning 20 acres (8.1 ha), and contains eight buildings and has approximately 454,000 square feet of space for light industrial, distribution, office and educational uses. Tenants include a generic drug manufacturer and food distributors, and academic and vocational training centers. The Mott Hall Bronx High School and the Urban Assembly School for Applied Math and Science are located on the site, within the Bathgate Educational Campus.

In January 2021, during the COVID-19 pandemic in New York City, a "mega-facility" vaccination site for COVID-19 vaccinations was opened at Bathgate Industrial Park, operating 24/7. Previously, the location had been a COVID testing site.

== See also ==
- Hunts Point Cooperative Market, another industrial park in the Bronx
- Rail freight transportation in New York City and Long Island
