= Livingston North railway station =

Railway station in West Lothian, Scotland

Livingston North Scottish Gaelic: Baile Dhunlèibhe a Tuath
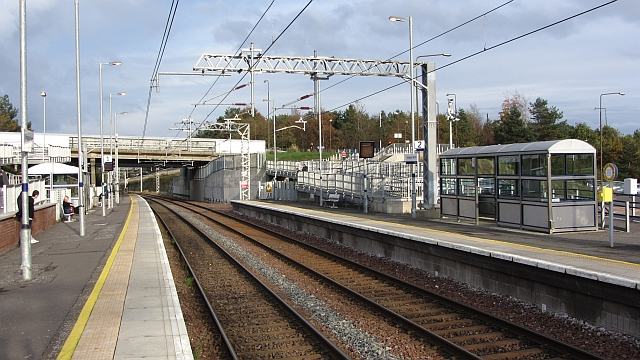
- Platform 1, looking towards Edinburgh in 2011

General information
- Location: Livingston, West Lothian; Scotland
- Coordinates: 55.9016°N 3.5435°W
- Grid reference: NT036686
- Manager: ScotRail
- Platforms: 2

Other information
- Station code: LSN

History
- Original company: British Rail

Key dates
- 24 March 1986: Opened

Passengers
- 2020/21: ▼0.185 million
- 2021/22: ▲0.611 million
- 2022/23: ▲0.808 million
- 2023/24: ▲0.995 million
- 2024/25: ▲1.034 million
Location
Notes
- Passenger statistics from the Office of Rail and Road

Livingston North railway station is one of two railway stations serving the town of Livingston in West Lothian, Scotland. It is located on the Edinburgh-Bathgate Line 15½ miles (25 km) west of Edinburgh and situated in the Carmondean area of Livingston. The other railway station in the town is Livingston South on the Shotts Line.

== History ==
Livingston North station opened on 24 March 1986, concurrent with the re-introduction of passenger services under British Rail on the Edinburgh to Bathgate Line. This station is situated 1/4 mile (400 m) east of the original Livingston station. As the line between Cawburn Junction and Bathgate had been singled, the stations at Livingston North and Uphall only required to have single platforms. The platform at Livingston North was built on the solum of the former Up (towards Edinburgh) line due to the station site being in a cutting and the need to provide ramped access (via a 'switchback' path) to it in addition to stepped access. When the station was built, the area immediately south of the line was undeveloped, this being the main reason that the platform was constructed on the north (up) side of the line.

Following route modernisation, re-establishment of double track, new platform for westbound trains and electrification, there are fairly large parking areas to the north and south of the station. As the station has been constructed without a footbridge, access between platforms and parking areas is by way of lengthy disabled ramps and a road bridge.

From opening in March 1986 until December 2010, train services were operated by diesel multiple units, initially Class 101s. From 1987, services were formed of Class 150 units but by 2008, Class 158 and/or Class 170s were used. From December 2010, following electrification, services have been formed of Class 334 electric multiple units.

Preceding station	National Rail	Following station
Uphall	ScotRail; North Clyde Line	Bathgate
	Historical railways	
Uphall	First ScotRail; Edinburgh to Bathgate Line	Bathgate (1986); Station closed; Line mostly open

== Airdrie - Bathgate Link ==
With the commencement of work for the Airdrie-Bathgate Rail Link, much excavation was needed around Livingston North station to provide the new platform and to avoid complete closure of the existing platform, which would have been unavoidable had the original railway boundary been observed. The new, second platform came into use on 20 October 2008, when for the first time in over half a century, passenger traffic served the area on a double track railway. Works continue to complete the transformation of the station.

Electrification followed in October 2010 in conjunction with the re-opening of the through route to Drumgelloch and Airdrie.

Rail services between Edinburgh and Livingston North were suspended in December 2010 due to cold weather. MSP Angela Constance said "The situation of train services in and around Livingston is desperate. The worst example is that no trains have left Livingston North station in the past 10 days". Stewart Stevenson replied blaming frozen points: "A particular issue in the rail network is heating the points at the junction where the line to Bathgate and Livingston North leaves the main line from Edinburgh to Glasgow via Falkirk."

== Services ==
=== 2007/08 ===
Monday to Saturday daytimes there was a half-hourly service eastbound to Edinburgh Waverley continuing to Newcraighall and westbound to Bathgate. Evenings and Sundays there is an hourly service in each direction.

=== From December 2008 ===
Monday to Saturday daytimes there was a half-hourly service eastbound to Edinburgh Waverley and westbound to 1986 Bathgate station. Evenings and Sundays there is an hourly service in each direction.

=== October to December 2010 ===
Monday to Saturday daytimes there was a half-hourly service eastbound to Edinburgh Waverley and westbound to the 2010 Bathgate station. Evenings and Sundays there is an hourly service in each direction.

=== Winter 2010/11 (From 12 December 2010) ===
During the week there is an eastbound service of four trains per hour to Edinburgh, with three per hour to Bathgate and one per hour to Helensburgh Central as a result of delays with commissioning of the Class 380 trains, insufficient Class 334 trains for the full service have been available for introduction of intended timetable from 12 December 2010.

When sufficient trains are available, the westbound services will consist of two trains per hour to Helensburgh Central and two trains per hour to Milngavie.

=== 2016 ===
There are four departure each hour in each direction (off peak Mon-Sat) in the May 2016 timetable, with two per hour in the evening and on Sundays. Westbound trains run to Queen Street Low Level via Bathgate & Airdrie and then onward to either Helensburgh Central or Milngavie (daytimes only), though some late night trains terminate short at Airdrie or Bathgate. Eastbound trains run to Edinburgh Waverley as before.
