= Bathgate railway station =

Railway station in West Lothian, Scotland

Bathgate
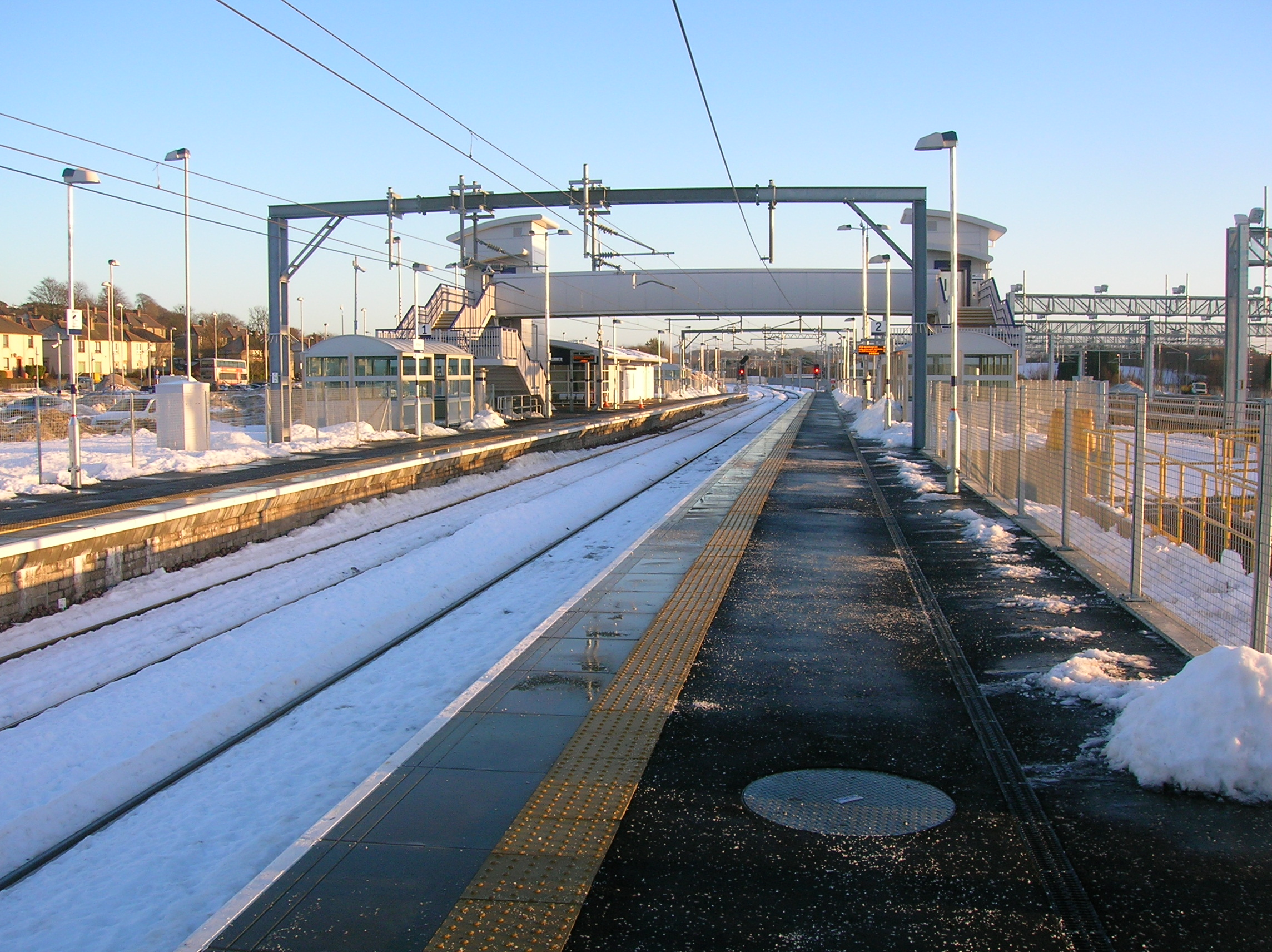
- Bathgate railway station, looking east

General information
- Location: Bathgate, West Lothian; Scotland
- Coordinates: 55.8971°N 3.6362°W
- Grid reference: NS981681
- Managed by: ScotRail
- Platforms: 2

Other information
- Station code: BHG

History
- Original company: First ScotRail

Key dates
- 18 October 2010: Opened

Passengers
- 2020/21: ▼0.211 million
- 2021/22: ▲0.600 million
- 2022/23: ▲0.770 million
- 2023/24: ▲0.898 million
- 2024/25: ▲0.938 million
Location
Notes
- Passenger statistics from the Office of Rail and Road

Bathgate railway station is a railway station serving the town of Bathgate in West Lothian, Scotland. Opened on 18 October 2010, it is close to the junction of the former Edinburgh and Bathgate Railway and the former Bathgate and Coatbridge Railway to the east of the 1986 station. Ticket gates are in operation.

== History ==
In 2005, the Scottish Executive announced that the then-closed section of line between the 1989 Drumgelloch station and Bathgate would be rebuilt as a double tracked electrified railway, termed the Airdrie-Bathgate Rail Link. This resulted in the closure of the 1986 station, replaced by the present station, 34 chains (750 yd; 680 m) east of the former station. The link connects with the North Clyde Line at Drumgelloch and the Edinburgh to Bathgate Line at Bathgate, forming a fourth rail link between Glasgow and Edinburgh.

The station opened on 18 October 2010, replacing the 1986 station, which closed at the end of the day's service on 16 October 2010. Rail replacement bus services were provided between Bathgate and Haymarket on Sunday 17 October 2010.

Services west of Bathgate commenced on 12 December 2010, with the route being incorporated into the North Clyde Line services.

== Services ==
=== October to December 2010 ===
At the time of opening in 2010, there was a half-hourly service from Bathgate to Edinburgh Monday to Saturdays with an hourly service on Sundays.

=== Winter 2010/11 (Interim timetable from 12 December 2010) ===
As a result of delays with commissioning of the Class 380 trains, insufficient Class 334 trains for the full service were available for the introduction of the intended timetable from 12 December 2010. Due to inclement weather some intermediate stations to Airdrie are provided with bus services whilst final works are completed.

Off-Peak Monday to Friday

- 1tph Helensburgh Central <<>> Edinburgh Waverley
- 3tph Bathgate <<>> Edinburgh Waverley

Monday to Friday after 6pm

- 1tph Helensburgh Central <<>> Edinburgh Waverley
- 1tph Bathgate <<>> Edinburgh Waverley

Saturday and Sunday

- 2tph Helensburgh Central <<>> Edinburgh Waverley

=== Winter 2010/11 (Full service) ===
Following the opening of the line between Airdrie and Bathgate, the service was combined with Edinburgh to Bathgate service, the complete service when sufficient rolling stock is available is:

Off-peak Monday to Saturday

- 2tph Helensburgh Central <<>> Edinburgh Waverley
- 2tph Milngavie <<>> Edinburgh Waverley

Monday to Saturday after 6pm

- 2tph Helensburgh Central <<>> Edinburgh Waverley

Sunday

- 2tph Helensburgh Central <<>> Edinburgh Waverley

=== 2016 ===
The same daytime & Sunday frequency applies in the May 2016 timetable, with a few early morning services starting from here (in both directions) and terminating here in the evening.

Preceding station	National Rail	Following station
Livingston North	ScotRail; North Clyde Line	Armadale
