= Airdrie railway station =

Railway station in North Lanarkshire, Scotland

Airdrie Scottish Gaelic: An t-Àrd Ruigh
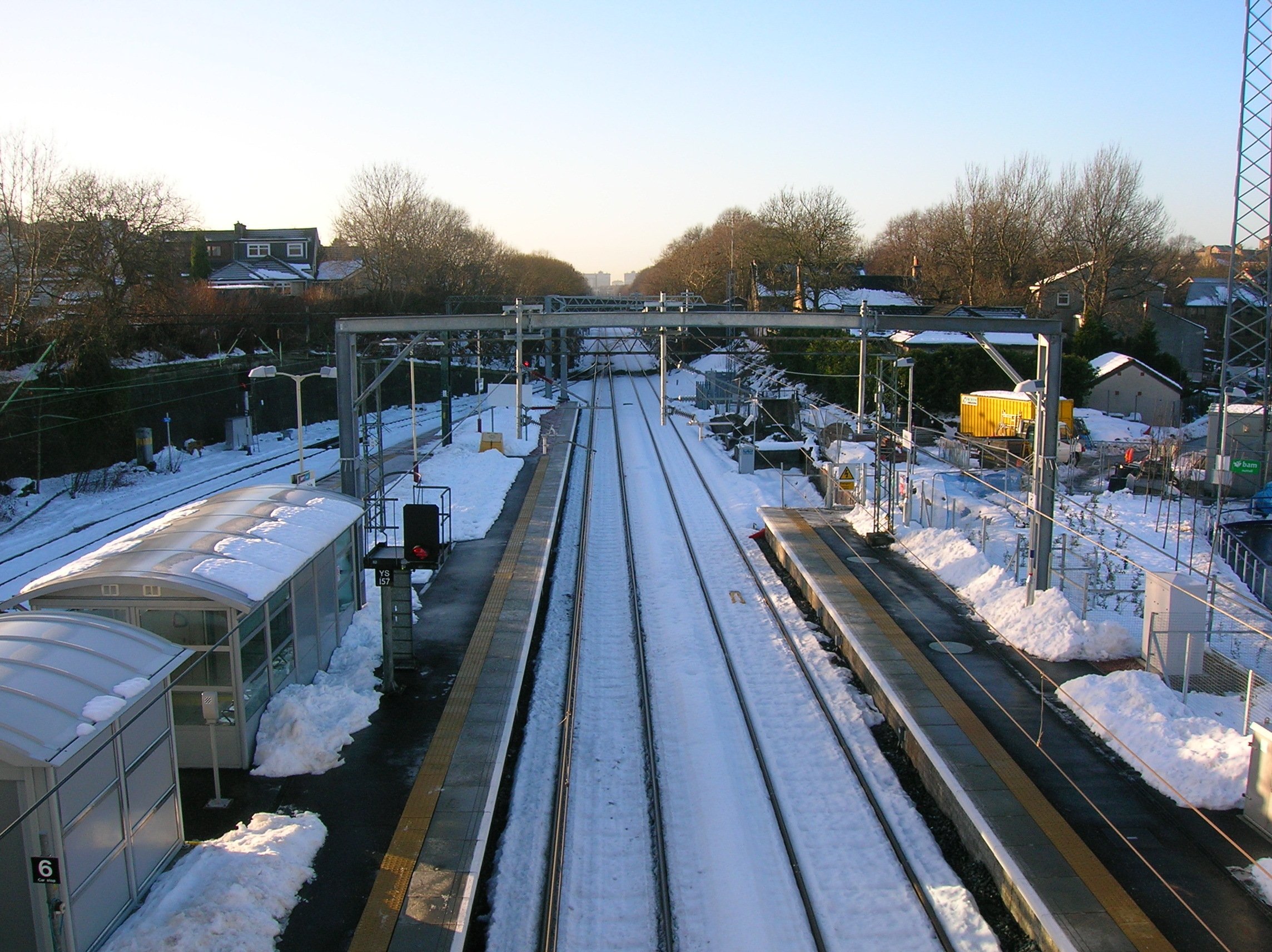
- Airdrie railway station, looking west

General information
- Location: Airdrie, North Lanarkshire; Scotland
- Coordinates: 55.8640°N 3.9826°W
- Grid reference: NS760652
- Manager: ScotRail
- Platforms: 3

Other information
- Station code: ADR

History
- Original company: Bathgate and Coatbridge Railway
- Pre-grouping: North British Railway

Key dates
- 11 August 1862: Station opened as Airdrie South
- 3 March 1952: Station renamed Airdrie

Passengers
- 2020/21: ▼0.121 million
- 2021/22: ▲0.477 million
- 2022/23: ▲0.633 million
- 2023/24: ▲0.775 million
- 2024/25: ▲0.810 million
Location
Notes
- Passenger statistics from the Office of Rail and Road

Airdrie railway station is a railway station serving the town of Airdrie, North Lanarkshire, Scotland. The station is managed by ScotRail and is served by trains on the North Clyde Line, 11 miles (18 km) east of Glasgow Queen Street.

== History ==
Opened by the Bathgate and Coatbridge Railway and absorbed into the North British Railway, it became part of the London and North Eastern Railway during the Grouping of 1923. The station then passed on to the Scottish Region of British Railways on nationalisation in 1948. British Railways then ran the station for Strathclyde PTE, and continued to do so as ScotRail when sectorisation was introduced, until the privatisation of British Rail. The station became a terminus in January 1956, when passenger services to Bathgate over the former B&CR were withdrawn - freight over this line continued until final closure & abandonment in 1982. The line from Glasgow was subsequently wired as part of the North Clyde electrification scheme in 1960. Strathclyde PTE & BR reopened a short portion of the line eastwards to a new station at Drumgelloch in 1989 and full reinstatement of the line to Bathgate followed in 2010 (see below).

As part of the Airdrie-Bathgate rail link reopening, the station has been refurbished, including the reinstatement of the second through platform with a capability of holding 9 carriages opposite the current Platform 2, which has been extended and a large car park facility (see link in sources below).

== Services ==
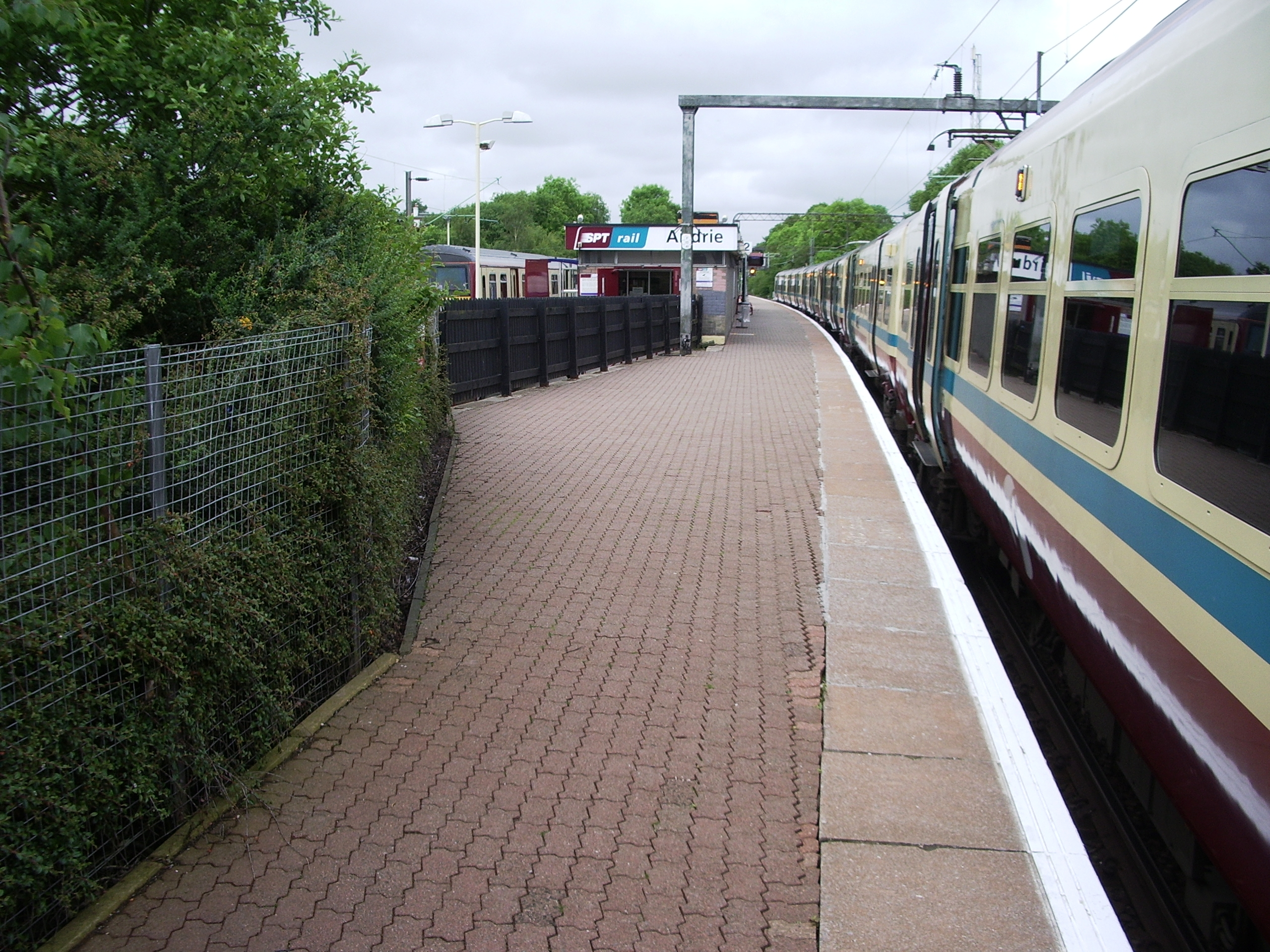
A Class 334 leaving for Helensburgh

=== 2008 ===
The station was served by half-hourly trains from Drumgelloch (1989) to Helensburgh Central and return, which used Platform 2.

Platform 1 was used by trains from Airdrie to Balloch, providing a 15-minute frequency towards Glasgow Queen Street, Monday to Saturday daytimes.

In addition to this, there were some peak time express services to Milngavie. These called at Coatdyke, Coatbridge Sunnyside and Blairhill before running fast to High Street then at all stations to Milngavie.

Evenings and Sundays, the half-hourly Drumgelloch to Helensburgh Central service operated.

=== May 2010 to December 2010 ===
Following closure of the 1989 Drumgelloch station as part of the Airdrie to Bathgate project (which included the construction of a new station to the east of the 1989 station), a half-hourly bus service operated to and from the 1989 Drumgelloch station to connect with services arriving from Glasgow and Helensburgh.

=== From 12 December 2010 ===
Following the opening of the line between Airdrie and Bathgate, the basic off-peak daytime service is:

- 2tph - Helensburgh Central to/from Edinburgh Waverley
- 2tph - Milngavie to/from Edinburgh Waverley
- 2tph - Airdrie to/from Balloch

The evening service is:

- 2tph - Helensburgh Central to/from Edinburgh Waverley

The Sunday service is:

- 2tph - Helensburgh Central to/from Edinburgh Waverley

=== 2016 ===
The daytime & Sunday service remains unchanged in the May 2016 timetable, but the evening service now runs to Balloch westbound rather than Milngavie (as well as to Helensburgh), whilst eastbound the Edinburgh service is half-hourly.

Preceding station	National Rail	Following station
Drumgelloch	ScotRail; North Clyde Line	Coatdyke
	Historical railways	
Clarkston; Line and Station open	Bathgate and Coatbridge Railway; North British Railway	Coatdyke; Line and Station open
Drumgelloch (1989); Station closed; Line open	First ScotRail; North Clyde Line	Coatdyke
