= Dechmont Law =

Hill in West Lothian, Scotland

Coordinates: 55.91065°N 3.54851°W

Dechmont Law (& Deer Hill)
- Deagh Mhonadh, Decky Hull
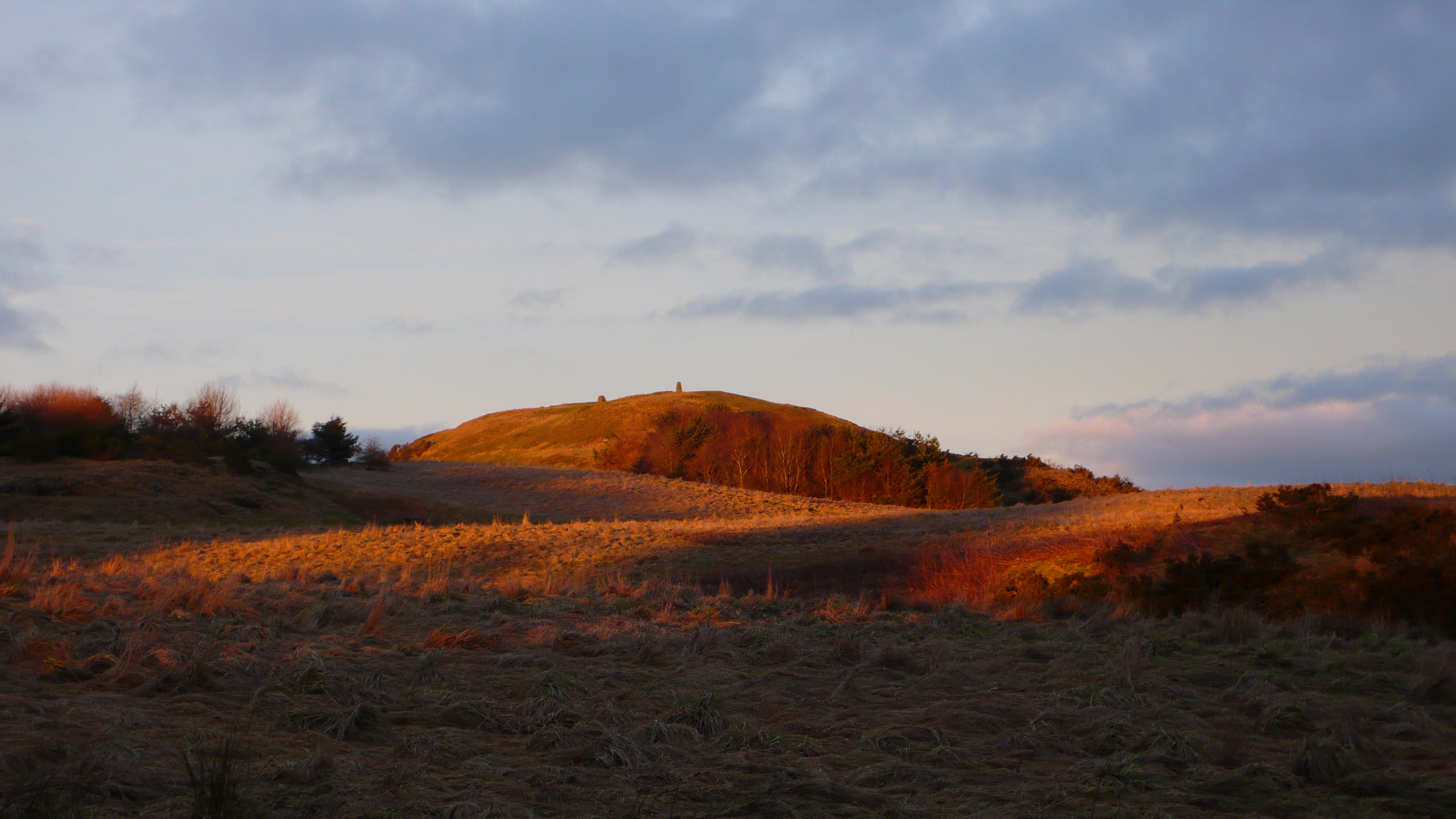

Highest point
- Elevation: 217 m (712 ft)
- Listing: none

Geography
- Location within Scotland
- Location: West Lothian, Scotland
- OS grid: NT033697
- Topo map: OS Landranger 65

Disambiguation: the name Dechmont, and an associated "Dechmont Hill" are also places near Cambuslang in Scotland

Dechmont Law (/dɛxˈmənt/ DEKH-mənt; Scottish Gaelic: Deagh-Mhonadh, Scots: Dechmont Law or Decky Law) is a hill in Livingston, West Lothian, Scotland. It lies around 700 yards southwest of the village of Dechmont, which provides its name. It is known locally as "Decky Hill" or as "Dechmont Hill" (Law is Lowland Scots for "hill"). "Deer Hill" is another peak of the same hill, to the northeast of the main peak.

It is the highest hill in the Livingston area, and Arthur's Seat and the Pentland Hills can be seen from here, as well as a view down the Almond valley.

== Etymology ==
The word "Dechmont" is Celtic in origin and likely from the Brythonic teg meaning "good" or "lovely", and mynydd meaning a moorland area. This has been Gaelicised as "Deagh-Mhonadh" which also means "good moorland". "Law" is the traditional Scots language name for a flat topped hill.

Local nicknames include "Decky Hull" or "Decky Law" dropping the velar fricative due to anglicisation.

== Geology ==
Dechmont Law is a volcanic plug.

== History ==
The slopes show signs of agricultural terracing, from the Bronze and Iron Age, but it is unclear whether it was ever a hillfort. Its strategic position makes this likely, but there is insufficient archaeological evidence.

=== The "Livingston Incident" ===
In 1979, forestry worker Bob Taylor had an alleged encounter with a UFO in the area of Dechmont Law.

=== Rory Blackhall murder ===
In 2005, the body of 11 year old Rory Blackhall was found under an old, upside-down, two-person tent in woodland west of Dechmont Law. Rory's body was discovered after a methodical two hour search by a Countryside Ranger who knew the area well. Two mountain rescue members and a rescue dog, searching independently, were at the same spot a few minutes later. The Ranger helped the police to secure the area. The case has since closed, the murder suspect having committed suicide.
