= Edinburgh–Bathgate line =

Railway line in Scotland

Overview
- Owner: Network Rail
- Locale: Edinburgh; Scotland

Service
- System: National Rail
- Operator: ScotRail

Technical
- Track gauge: 4 ft 8 1/2 in (1,435 mm)

The Edinburgh–Bathgate line is a railway line in East Central Scotland. It is also known as the Bathgate branch and was originally operated by the Edinburgh and Bathgate Railway. Except for the short section at the original Bathgate terminus, the main line is still in use, with a frequent passenger train service operated by ScotRail.

== History ==
The Edinburgh and Bathgate Railway was opened from a junction near Ratho to Bathgate, in 1849. The owning company immediately leased the line to the Edinburgh and Glasgow Railway. From the following year, shale oil was extracted in the area, and the line became very successful from that traffic. Other railways joined at Bathgate and the line later became part of a through route from Edinburgh to Glasgow via Airdrie. In 1956 the passenger service was withdrawn, but it was reinstated from Edinburgh to Bathgate in 1986. In 2010 the through route to Airdrie and Glasgow was reopened and electrified, and the line continues in heavy passenger use at the present day.

=== Authorisation and opening ===
Edinburgh and Bathgate Railway Act 1846
- Act of Parliament
- Parliament of the United Kingdom
- Long title: An Act for making a Railway from the Edinburgh and Glasgow Railway to Bathgate, with Branches, to be called "The Edinburgh and Bathgate Railway."
- Citation: 9 & 10 Vict. c. cccxxxii

Dates
- Royal assent: 3 August 1846

Edinburgh and Bathgate Railway (Deviation and Amendment) Act 1847
- Act of Parliament
- Parliament of the United Kingdom
- Long title: An Act to enable the Edinburgh and Bathgate Railway Company to deviate a Portion of their Main Line, and for other Purposes.
- Citation: 10 & 11 Vict. c. ccxlvi

Dates
- Royal assent: 22 July 1847

Text of statute as originally enacted

Edinburgh and Bathgate Railway (Extension and Deviation) Act 1848
- Act of Parliament
- Parliament of the United Kingdom
- Long title: An Act to enable the Edinburgh and Bathgate Railway Company to extend their Whitburn Branch, and to alter or deviate their Uphall and Binnie Branch.
- Citation: 11 & 12 Vict. c. cxvi

Dates
- Royal assent: 14 August 1848

Text of statute as originally enacted

North British and Edinburgh and Bathgate Railways Act 1870
- Act of Parliament
- Parliament of the United Kingdom
- Long title: An Act to amend "The Edinburgh and Bathgate Railway Act, 1846," with respect to the Rents payable under the Lease thereby authorised; and for other purposes.
- Citation: 33 & 34 Vict. c. xci

Dates
- Royal assent: 4 July 1870

Text of statute as originally enacted

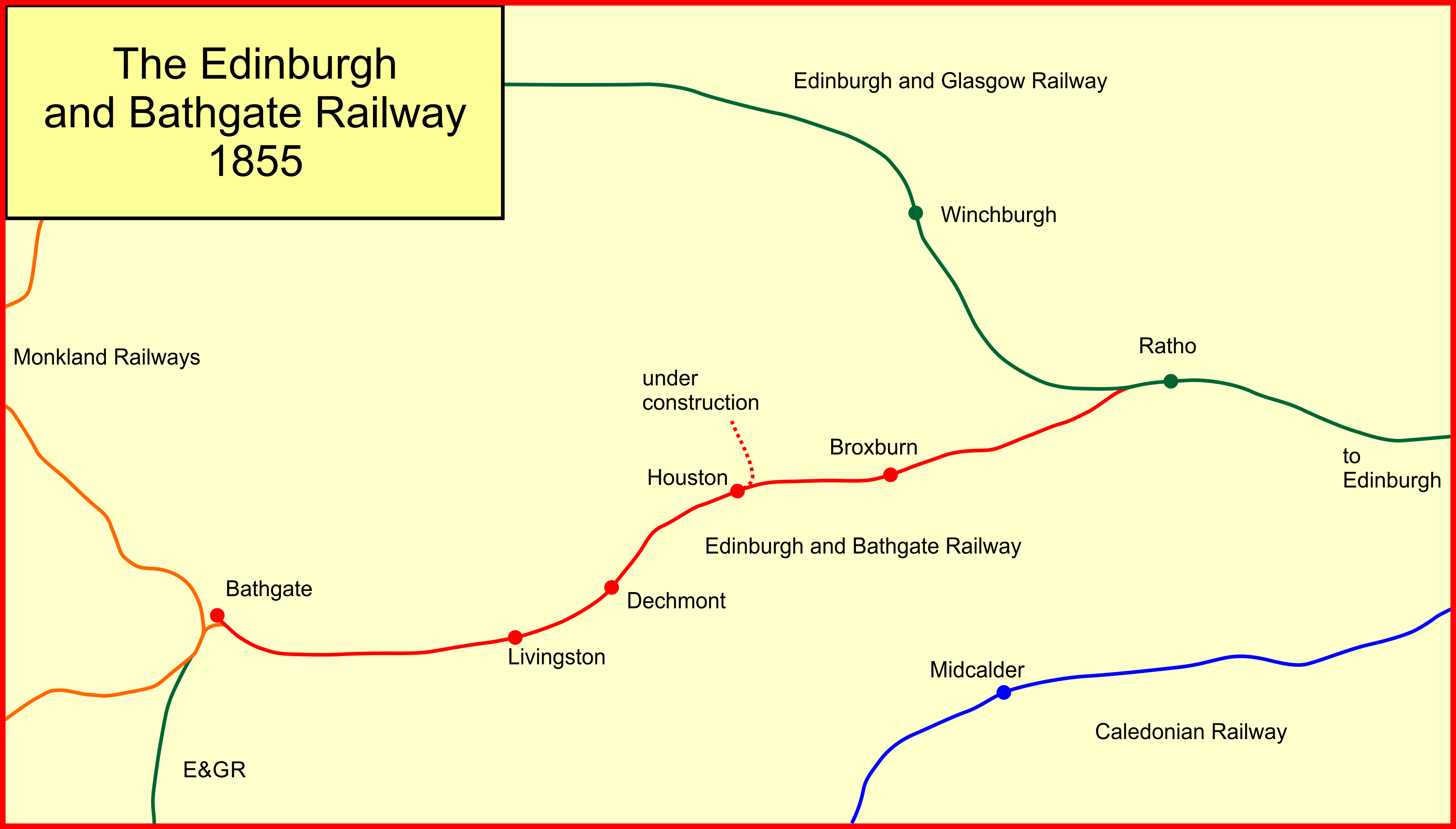
System map of the Edinburgh and Bathgate Railway

The Edinburgh and Bathgate Railway (E&BR) was authorised by the Edinburgh and Bathgate Railway Act 1846 (9 & 10 Vict. c. cccxxxii) on 3 August 1846. The main line of 11 miles (17 km) was to run to Bathgate, then an important manufacturing town, from a junction near Ratho on the Edinburgh and Glasgow Railway main line. (Note: Awdry says on the Slamannan Railway, but that is wrong; the Slamannan came no nearer than Manuel.) In addition there were to be branches to Midcalder, to Binny Quarries, from Barrack to Whitburn, and a loop from Whitburn to Bathgate, though in fact only one of these was built by the E&BR. The authorised capital was £250,000. Two subsequent acts of Parliament, the Edinburgh and Bathgate Railway (Deviation and Amendment) Act 1847 (10 & 11 Vict. c. ccxlvi) and the Edinburgh and Bathgate Railway (Extension and Deviation) Act 1848 (11 & 12 Vict. c. cxvi), authorised deviations.

The engineer for the work was Thomas Grainger.

The only branch that was built by the E&BR was to Uphall, and from there a mineral railway extension ran to the Binny Quarry, near Ecclesmachan. The main line to Bathgate was opened on 12 November 1849. The company had been encouraged by the E&GR, and the E&BR leased its line to the E&GR for 999 years from the date of opening. The lease charge was 4% of the capital cost of the line plus a proportion of receipts. (Note: The lease charge was complex; the E&GR were to pay to the E&BR "an annual fixed rent ... equal to four per cent. on [the cost of constructing the line, and also] a further fluctuating and contingent rent, or consideration, equal to one-half of the whole receipts ... after deducting the said fixed rent of four per cent., and a sum equal to 33 per cent. on such gross receipts in respect of the expense of maintaining and working the [line]".) (Note: Some sources are unclear about the status of the company. Ross says (page 72) that it was "vested" in the E&GR for 999 years from 31 July 1852, and it "passed into the NBR embrace in 1865". In fact the Edinburgh and Bathgate Railway Company remained in existence until 1922, but the physical line was leased to the E&GR, and the lease passed to the NBR when it took over the E&GR in 1865.)

As a shell company the Edinburgh and Bathgate Railway Company remained in existence until the grouping of the railways in 1923 (see below).

The initial stations from Bathgate Junction (near Ratho) were Broxburn, Houston, and Bathgate.

=== Developments at Bathgate ===
Bathgate was an established centre of traditional industries when the line was proposed, but the situation was revolutionised when James Young, an industrial chemist, had developed an industrial process of manufacturing paraffin from torbanite, a type of oil shale. He had obtained a patent for the process in October 1850, and the torbanite had been discovered on the Torbanehill estate, about halfway between Bathgate and Whitburn. Young joined in partnership with Edward William Binney and Edward Meldrum and the Bathgate Works started operations in February 1851. This was the first commercial oil works in the world. When the torbanite was exhausted, shale rocks were exploited, at Bathgate and elsewhere in the locality, and although they had an inferior oil content they were nonetheless commercially desirable. The Edinburgh and Glasgow Railway built a branch line from the E&BR line to Blackhall, connecting Young's oil processing plant; the line opened in 1850 and diverged from the E&BR immediately east of the Bathgate station.

The Monkland Railways too wished to reach the area and they extended their line eastward from Blackstone Junction (on the former Slamannan Railway) and from Armadale, both routes reaching Bathgate in 1855, and connecting the town to Airdrie and Coatbridge, via the rope-worked Ballochney Railway section of the Monkland Railways. The rope worked sections were by-passed by the "new line" by 1859, but it was not until 1871 that a direct NBR line between Coatbridge and Glasgow was available.

Numerous mineral branches were built from the E&BR line to nearby points of extraction.

=== The North British Railway ===
The Edinburgh and Glasgow was absorbed by the North British Railway on 1 August 1865; the E&GR had itself absorbed the Monkland Railways the previous day.

In 1866 the E&BR Company was opposing NBR bills for direct access to certain mineral sites, which would reduce NBR dependency on the E&BR. The NBR board set about a scheme to purchase the E&BR company outright, and agreed terms of 5% on capital for seven years, then rising to 5.5%, as well as accepting all of the E&BR's debenture debt. However a shareholders' meeting threw out the scheme. At the E&BR half-yearly meeting on 10 August 1866 the E&BR chairman regretted the loss of the arrangement, blaming factions within the NBR.

In 1869 the NBR built a branch to Pumpherston Oil Works and Camps brickworks (from Houston) and in 1875 to Seafield Oil Works (from West Calder Branch Junction).

In 1897 the NBR opened the chord at Bathgate allowing through running from north (Blackstone) to east (towards Edinburgh).

=== Passenger services ===
In 1895 there were seven passenger trains daily on the line, with two more on Saturdays; some of these were semi-fast, running through from Edinburgh to Glasgow.

=== Bangour Private Railway ===
In June 1904 the first patients were admitted to Bangour Village Hospital, a mental hospital near Dechmont. The road network in the district was inadequate, and the large premises would require a considerable volume of general stores as well as coal. A private branch railway was opened to the public on 19 June 1905 from the E&BR line, authorised by the Edinburgh and District Lunacy Board Act, 30 July 1900. (The line may have been used before the official opening date in connection with construction of the hospital.) It was worked by the North British Railway, and there was an intermediate station at Dechmont, available to the general public, and many of the staff lived at Dechmont and used the railway for travel to the hospital. Bangour station was considered private, and tickets issued to and from it were marked "Bangour (Private)".

The terms of operation by the NBR required the hospital to guarantee an income of £1,500 annually to the NBR. It was estimated that the actual income was £300 a year, so that the subsidy amounted to £1,200.

The hospital was extensively used during World War I for treatment of wounded soldiers, and the road network was correspondingly improved. After the war, the necessity for the railway was diminished and it was closed on 1 August 1921, although passenger services probably ceased on 4 May 1921.

=== The twentieth century ===
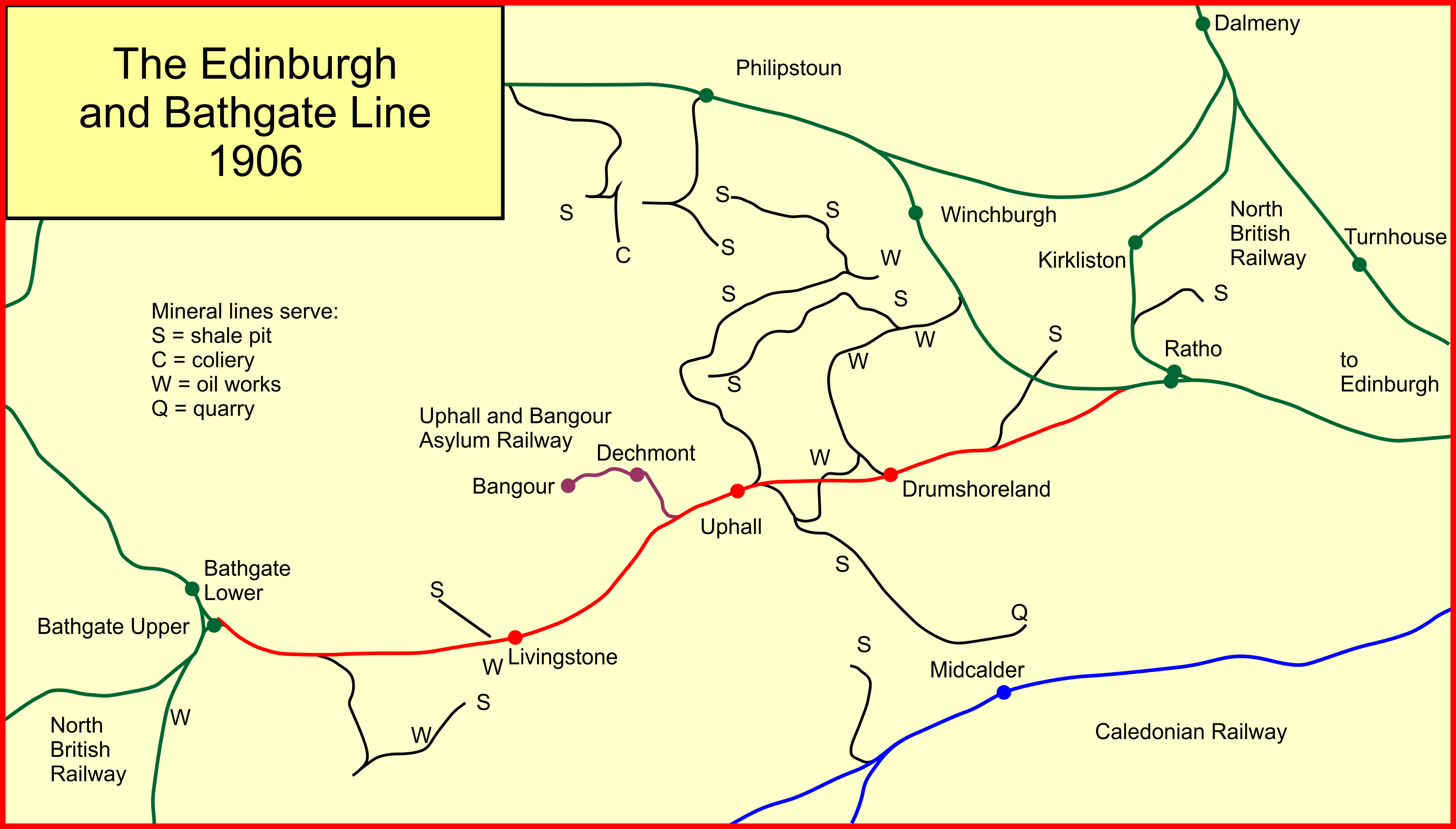
The Edinburgh and Bathgate line in 1906

In the first decades of the twentieth century, the shale oil industry was at its height, and numerous mineral lines were connected to the Bathgate line serving shale pits and oil works, where the oil was extracted from the mineral.

However the availability of cheaper liquid oil supplies from the Middle East and elsewhere reduced the demand for shale oil, and the industry declined sharply by 1918.

In 1923 the North British Railway became a constituent of the new London and North Eastern Railway following the Railways Act 1921, and the government again reorganised the railways in 1948, when the Scottish Region of the nationally owned British Railways took charge.

Bathgate remained a manufacturing base, but passenger use of the line had declined heavily. On 8 January 1956 the passenger service was withdrawn. A sporadic goods service continued. Still, the line was sustained by the motor vehicle manufacturing activity, when the British Motor Corporation (BMC) plant in Bathgate, West Lothian, (which later became part of British Leyland), was opened in 1961. Some passenger use of the line for seasonal trains continued until 1960.

=== Mid-century developments ===
The road traffic congestion in Edinburgh became increasingly difficult in the 1970s and 1980s. In addition, Livingston New Town had now developed considerably from a slow start, (Note: Livingston was designated as a new town in 1962, although the intention was first declared in 1946. The growth of the urban area eventually filled the space between the former E&BR line and the Shotts line to Edinburgh. A new station opened on the latter line on 6 October 1984.) and a scheme was prepared to reopen the E&BR line as a branch from the Edinburgh and Glasgow main line to Bathgate, following the original E&BR main line.

=== Reopening ===
Having only carried freight traffic to and from Bathgate (mainly automotive traffic) since passenger services ceased over the line in 1956, the line was reopened to passenger services on 24 March 1986 by British Rail. Lothian Regional Council provided substantial funding toward the project, which was intended to help ease commuting difficulties to and from Edinburgh as road congestion worsened in the mid 1980s, and to alleviate some of the hardship caused by West Lothian's industrial decline. (Since passenger services had ceased in 1956, the remaining shale oil industry became extinct, coal mining was virtually ended in 1984–1986 by the Thatcher government, and the Bathgate plant of British Leyland was slated for closure.)

Economies were made in the project delivery - specifically three miles of railway were removed and between Cawburn Jn and Carmondean Jn, a single line was provided, serving Uphall railway station and Livingston North railway station. The passenger line continued to the terminus at Bathgate while a freight only line (the former Down line) ran between Carmondean Jn and Bathgate yard.

The line succeeded in respect of patronage; usage was well above predictions and over the years, Sunday trains were introduced, and the basic weekday service doubled from hourly to every thirty minutes each way during peak hours.

From the lines reopening in 1986 by British Rail until electrification, passenger train services were operated by diesel multiple units (at first mainly Class 101s, then from 1987 mainly Class 150s and then (2008–9) Class 158 or Class 170s.)

Following completion of the Airdrie–Bathgate rail link and electrification of the route resulting in the incorporation of the service into the North Clyde Line timetable, services has been operated by Class 334 electric multiple units. Delay in the delivery and commissioning of the Class 380 resulted in diesel services operating initially between Edinburgh and Bathgate. In 2011, a half-hourly service between Edinburgh Waverley and Helensburgh Central was introduced.

=== Extension to Airdrie and Glasgow ===
In 2005, the Scottish Executive declared that in line with plans to upgrade the unfinished part of the A8 to motorway standard, public transport links between Glasgow and Edinburgh also needed to be improved.

The closed section of the Bathgate and Coatbridge Railway between the 1989 Drumgelloch station and Bathgate was rebuilt and electrified, connecting with the North Clyde Line at Drumgelloch. This opened up an important fourth railway link between Glasgow and Edinburgh, giving many towns in West Lothian better connections to the Greater Glasgow conurbation.

From 12 December 2010, the Edinburgh to Bathgate service was absorbed into the North Clyde Line with services from Helensburgh Central and Milngavie via Airdrie. All work on the extension was completed by 8 March 2011.

== Topography ==
- Bathgate Junction; divergence from Edinburgh to Glasgow main line; now known as Newbridge Junction;
- Broxburn; opened 12 November 1849; renamed Drumshoreland May 1870; closed 18 June 1951; there was a Broxburn station on the E&GR main line until 1849;
- Pumpherston branch junction; Pumpherston Oil Works 1869–1961 and Camps Brick Works 1869–1959;
- Houston; opened 12 November 1849; renamed Uphall 1 August 1865; closed 9 January 1956; reopened 24 March 1986;
- Bangour Branch Junction; divergence of Uphall and Bangour Asylum Railway 1905–1921;
- Dechmont; opened October 1850, with trains calling on Wednesdays only; closed December 1861; there was later a Dechmont station on the Bangour branch;
- Livingstone; opened 12 November 1849; sometimes also spelt Livingston; (Note: The 1895 "Bradshaw" uses Livingstone. The signal box at the site was named Livingstone in the 1960 Sectional Appendix issued by British Railways Scottish Region.) closed 1 November 1948; a new station known as Livingston North was opened on 24 March 1986 0.80-mile (1.29 km) to the east;
- Bathgate Junction; divergence of connection to Monkland Railways route;
- Bathgate; opened 12 November 1849; renamed Bathgate Upper 1856; closed 9 January 1956; reopened 24 March 1986; closed 12 December 2010 when new station on through line opened.
