= Inverclyde Council elections =

Local government elections in Inverclyde, Scotland

Inverclyde Council in Scotland holds elections every five years, previously holding them every four years from its creation as a single-tier authority in 1995 to 2007.

== Council elections ==
=== As a district council ===
Year	Labour	SNP	Conservative	Liberal (Note: Alliance from 1981 to 1988, Liberal Democrats from 1988 to 1995.)	Independent
1974	15	0	3	4	1
1977	8	1	1	13	0
1980	13	0	1	9	0
1984 (Note: New ward boundaries.)	11	0	0	9	0
1988	12	0	1	7	0
1992	11	0	1	8	0

=== As a unitary authority ===
Year	Labour	SNP	Conservative	Liberal Democrats	Independent
1995	14	0	1	5	0
1999 (Note: New ward boundaries.)	11	0	1	8	0
2003	6	0	0	13	1
2007 (Note: Change to single transferable vote system and new ward boundaries.)	9	5	1	4	1
2012	10	6	1	2	1
2017 (Note: New ward boundaries.)	8	7	2	1	4
2022	9	8	2	0	3

== Results maps ==
1995 results map

1999 results map

2003 results map

2017 results map

2022 results map

== By-elections ==
=== 2007-2012 ===
Inverclyde South West By-Election 18 June 2009
Party	Candidate	FPv%	Count					
Party	Candidate	FPv%	1	2	3	4	5	6
SNP	Innes Nelson	42.4	919	923	932	949	988	1,087
Liberal Democrats	Eric Forbes	21.0	454	455	466	478	522	620
Labour	Alex McGhee	22.6	490	492	494	507	519	
Conservative	Iain MacLeod	7.9	171	171	178	182		
Independent	Paul Travers	3.1	67	72	77			
UKIP	Laurel Bush	2.3	49	50				
Free Scotland Party	Iain Ramsay	0.8	17					
SNP hold								
Valid: 2,167 Spoilt: 29 Quota: 1,084 Turnout: 2,196

=== 2022-2027 ===
Inverclyde West By-Election 7 November 2024
Party	Candidate	FPv%	Count				
Party	Candidate	FPv%	1	2	3	4	5
Labour	Ian Hellyer	34.0	932	961	999	1,165	1,568
SNP	Robert Kirkpatrick	33.7	923	939	1,050	1,082	
Conservative	Ted Runciman	15.2	415	485	515		
Alba	Christopher McEleny	8.7	239	258			
Reform	John Burleigh	8.4	230				
Labour hold							
Valid: 2,739 Spoilt: 19 Quota: 1,370 Turnout: 2,758
