= Greenock and Inverclyde (Scottish Parliament constituency) =

Region or constituency of the Scottish Parliament

- Former county constituency for the Scottish Parliament

- Greenock and Inverclyde shown within the West Scotland electoral region and the region shown within Scotland
- Population: 72,866 (2019)

Former constituency
- Created: 1999
- Abolished: 2026
- Council area: Inverclyde
- Replaced by: Inverclyde

Greenock and Inverclyde was a constituency of the Scottish Parliament covering most of the council area of Inverclyde. It elected one Member of the Scottish Parliament (MSP) by the first past the post method of election, and was also one of ten constituencies in the West Scotland electoral region, which elected seven additional members, in addition to the ten constituency MSPs, to produce a form of proportional representation for the region as a whole.

The Greenock and Inverclyde constituency was created for the first election to the Scottish Parliament in 1999. As a result of the second periodic review of Scottish Parliament boundaries in 2025, it was abolished, being replaced by Inverclyde from the 2026 Scottish Parliament election. This constituency is slightly larger than Greenock and Inverclyde, and also includes Kilmacolm, which had previously been part of Renfrewshire North and West.

The seat's final MSP was Stuart McMillan of the Scottish National Party, who held it from the 2016 Scottish Parliament election until its abolition.

== Electoral region ==
During the period Greenock and Inverclyde was in existence, the other nine constituencies of the West Scotland region were: Clydebank and Milngavie, Cunninghame North, Cunninghame South, Dumbarton, Eastwood, Paisley, Renfrewshire North and West, Renfrewshire South and Strathkelvin and Bearsden.

During this period the region covered part of the Argyll and Bute council area, the East Dunbartonshire council area, the East Renfrewshire council area, the Inverclyde council area, North Ayrshire council area, the Renfrewshire council area and the West Dunbartonshire council area.

== Constituency boundaries and council area ==
Map of boundaries from 2011

The constituency covered most of Inverclyde, including the main population centres of Greenock, Gourock and Port Glasgow. The eastern part of Inverclyde, around the village of Kilmacolm being covered by the Renfrewshire North and West constituency.

The Greenock and Inverclyde constituency was created at the same time as the Scottish Parliament, ahead of the 1999 Scottish Parliament election, using the name and boundaries of the existing Greenock and Inverclyde constituency of the House of Commons of the United Kingdom. Ahead of the 2005 United Kingdom general election the boundaries used for elections to the House of Commons constituencies were altered, with the area becoming part of a larger Inverclyde constituency in the UK Parliament. Greenock and Inverclyde was retained as a seat for the Scottish Parliament at this time, and there is now no longer any link between the two sets of boundaries.

The constituency boundaries were reviewed ahead of the 2011 Scottish Parliament election. The electoral wards used to define Greenock and Inverclyde at this review are listed below:

- In full: Inverclyde Central, Inverclyde East Central, Inverclyde North, Inverclyde South, Inverclyde South West, Inverclyde West
- In part: Inverclyde East (shared with Renfrewshire North and West)

== Member of the Scottish Parliament ==
Election	Member	Party
1999	Duncan McNeil	Labour
2016	Stuart McMillan	SNP

== Election results ==
=== 2020s ===
2021 Scottish Parliament election: Greenock and Inverclyde
Party	Candidate	Constituency			Regional		
Party	Candidate	Votes	%	±%	Votes	%	±%
SNP	Stuart McMillan (Note: Incumbent member for this constituency)	19,713	54.2	▲0.5	17,618	48.3	▼1.0
Labour	Francesca Brennan	11,539	31.7	▲4.0	8,569	23.5	▼1.1
Conservative	Caroline Hollins	3,313	9.1	▼5.0	5,211	14.3	▼0.6
Liberal Democrats	Jacci Stoyle	1,033	2.8	▼1.6	965	2.6	▼0.7
Independent	John Burleigh	776	2.1	New			
Green					2,291	6.3	▲2.5
Alba					728	2.0	New
All for Unity					245	0.7	New
Scottish Family					216	0.6	New
Independent Green Voice					184	0.5	New
Abolish the Scottish Parliament					101	0.3	New
Freedom Alliance (UK)					61	0.2	New
UKIP					51	0.1	▼1.7
Scottish Libertarian					47	0.1	0.0
Reform					46	0.1	New
TUSC					45	0.1	New
Independent	Maurice Campbell				24	0.1	New
Scotia Future					22	0.1	New
Independent	James Morrison				20	0.1	New
Renew					4	0.0	New
Majority		8,174	22.5	▼3.5			
Valid votes		36,374			36,448		
Invalid votes		116			90		
Turnout		36,490	63.6	▲5.9	36,538	63.7	▲5.9
SNP hold		Swing					

=== 2010s ===
2016 Scottish Parliament election: Greenock and Inverclyde
Party	Candidate	Constituency			Regional		
Party	Candidate	Votes	%	±%	Votes	%	±%
SNP	Stuart McMillan (Note: Incumbent member for this constituency)	17,032	53.7	▲11.6	15,677	49.3	▲6.4
Labour	Siobhan McCready	8,802	27.7	▼16.2	7,822	24.6	▼12.1
Conservative	Graeme Brooks	4,487	14.1	▲7.0	4,731	14.9	▲8.0
Green					1,209	3.8	▲1.8
Liberal Democrats	John Watson	1,404	4.4	▼2.5	1,057	3.3	▼1.1
UKIP					561	1.8	▲1.2
Solidarity					338	1.1	▲1.0
Scottish Christian					259	0.8	▼0.1
RISE					118	0.4	New
Scottish Libertarian					46	0.1	New
Majority		8,230	26.0	N/A			
Valid votes		31,725			31,818		
Invalid votes		113			63		
Turnout		31,838	57.7	▲8.0	31,881	57.8	▲8.1
SNP gain from Labour		Swing		▲13.9			
Notes

2011 Scottish Parliament election: Greenock and Inverclyde
Party	Candidate	Constituency			Regional		
Party	Candidate	Votes	%	±%	Votes	%	±%
Labour	Duncan McNeil (Note: Incumbent member for this constituency)	12,387	43.9	N/A	10,344	36.7	N/A
SNP	Stuart McMillan (Note: Incumbent member on the party list, or for another constituency)	11,876	42.1	N/A	12,079	42.9	N/A
Conservative	Graeme Brooks	2,011	7.1	N/A	1,955	6.9	N/A
Liberal Democrats	Ross Finnie	1,934	6.9	N/A	1,244	4.4	N/A
Green					551	2.0	N/A
All-Scotland Pensioners Party					483	1.7	N/A
Socialist Labour					416	1.5	N/A
Scottish Christian					266	0.9	N/A
BNP					208	0.7	N/A
UKIP					174	0.6	N/A
Scottish Socialist					166	0.6	N/A
Solidarity					38	0.1	N/A
Independent	Richard Vassie				12	0.0	N/A
Others					233	0.8	N/A
Majority		511	1.8	N/A			
Valid votes		28,208			28,169		
Invalid votes		132			134		
Turnout		28,340	49.7	N/A	28,303	49.7	N/A
Labour win (new boundaries)							

=== 2000s ===
2007 Scottish Parliament election: Greenock and Inverclyde
Party	Candidate	Votes	%	±%
Labour	Duncan McNeil	10,035	43.4	+2.7
SNP	Stuart McMillan	7,011	30.3	+15.4
Liberal Democrats	Ross Finnie	3,893	16.8	−11.2
Conservative	Charles Ferguson	2,166	9.4	+2.8
Majority		3,024	13.1	+0.4
Turnout		23,105	51.8	+0.1
Labour hold		Swing		

2003 Scottish Parliament election: Greenock and Inverclyde
Party	Candidate	Votes	%	±%
Labour	Duncan McNeil	9,674	40.7	−0.6
Liberal Democrats	Ross Finnie	6,665	28.0	+1.8
SNP	Tom Chalmers	3,532	14.9	−8.7
Scottish Socialist	Tricia McCafferty	2,338	9.8	+6.8
Conservative	Charles Dunlop	1,572	6.6	+0.7
Majority		3,009	12.7	−2.4
Turnout		23,781	51.7	−7.3
Labour hold		Swing		

=== 1990s ===
1999 Scottish Parliament election: Greenock and Inverclyde
Party	Candidate	Votes	%	±%
Labour	Duncan McNeil	11,817	41.3	N/A
Liberal Democrats	Ross Finnie	7,504	26.2	N/A
SNP	Ian Hamilton	6,762	23.6	N/A
Conservative	Richard Wilkinson	1,699	5.9	N/A
Scottish Socialist	Les Robertson	857	3.0	N/A
Majority		4,313	15.1	N/A
Turnout		28,639	59.0	N/A
Labour win (new seat)				

== See also ==
- Greenock and Inverclyde (UK Parliament constituency)
