= Inverclyde and Renfrewshire West =

UK Parliament constituency (since 2024)

- County constituency for the House of Commons
- Interactive map of current boundaries
- Boundary of Inverclyde and Renfrewshire West in Scotland
- Subdivision: Inverclyde and Renfrewshire
- Electorate: 70,418 (March 2020)
- Major settlements: Bridge of Weir, Gourock, Greenock, Inverkip, Port Glasgow

Current constituency
- Created: 2024
- Member of Parliament: Martin McCluskey (Labour)
- Seats: One
- Created from: Inverclyde & Paisley and Renfrewshire North

Inverclyde and Renfrewshire West is a constituency of the House of Commons in the UK Parliament. Further to the completion of the 2023 review of Westminster constituencies, it was first contested at the 2024 general election, since when it has been represented by Martin McCluskey of Scottish Labour.

== Boundaries ==
The constituency is composed of the following:

- The whole of the Inverclyde Council area, comprising the wards of Inverclyde East, Inverclyde East Central, Inverclyde Central, Inverclyde North, Inverclyde South West, Inverclyde South;
- part of the Renfrewshire Council ward of Bishopton, Bridge of Weir and Langbank (southern area including Bridge of Weir); and
- part of the Renfrewshire Council ward of Houston, Crosslee and Linwood (northwestern area including the communities of Houston, Crosslee and Craigends).

The Inverclyde Council area comprised the former constituency of Inverclyde; the parts in Renfrewshire Council were transferred almost entirely from the Paisley and Renfrewshire North constituency.

== Members of Parliament ==
Election	Member	Party
2024	Martin McCluskey	Scottish Labour

== Election results ==
=== Elections in the 2020s ===
General election 2024: Inverclyde and Renfrewshire West
Party	Candidate	Votes	%	±%
Labour	Martin McCluskey	18,931	46.9	+18.7
SNP	Ronnie Cowan	12,560	31.1	−16.4
Conservative	Ted Runciman	2,863	7.1	−10.8
Reform	Simon Moorehead	2,476	6.1	N/A
Liberal Democrats	Ross Stalker	1,259	3.1	−3.3
Green	Iain Hamilton	1,173	2.9	N/A
Alba	Christopher McEleny	723	1.8	N/A
Independent	John Burleigh	365	0.9	N/A
Majority		6,371	15.8	N/A
Turnout		40,350	57.5	−8.3
Registered electors		70,126		
Labour gain from SNP		Swing	+17.5	

=== Elections in the 2010s ===
2019 notional result (Note: Estimate of the 2019 general election result as if the revised boundaries recommended under the 2023 boundary review were in place)
Party	Vote	%
SNP	21,995	47.5
Labour	13,062	28.2
Conservative	8,284	17.9
Liberal Democrats	2,982	6.4
Majority	8,933	19.3
Turnout	46,323	65.8
Electorate	70,418	
