= Chris McEleny =

Scottish lobbyist and politician

General Secretary of the Alba Party
- In office 4 June 2021 – 27 February 2025
- Leader: Alex Salmond; Kenny MacAskill (acting)
- Preceded by: Office established
- Succeeded by: Corri Wilson

Leader of the SNP Group on Inverclyde Council
- In office 2013–2020
- Preceded by: Keith Brooks
- Succeeded by: Elizabeth Robertson

Personal details
- Born: 1985 or 1986 (age 39–40) Greenock, Scotland
- Party: Independent
- Other political affiliations: Alba (2021–2025); SNP (until 2021)

Christopher McEleny (born 1985 or 1986) is a Scottish political lobbyist and former politician. He served as the Scottish National Party's group leader on Inverclyde Council from 2013 to 2020, before defecting to the Alba Party in 2021 and becoming their first elected representative. He served as General Secretary of the Alba Party from June 2021 until his suspension and later expulsion from the party in 2025 due to gross misconduct.

McEleny is also notable for his legal case against the Ministry of Defence in which supporting Scottish independence was ruled as being protected from discrimination under the Equality Act 2010 in 2018.

== Early life ==
McEleny was born in Greenock. He attended Notre Dame High School and was a goalkeeper for the Port Glasgow Juniors.

== Career ==
=== Scottish National Party (2012–2021) ===
McEleny was elected as a councillor for Inverclyde West at the 2012 Inverclyde Council election becoming the SNP group's whip. He succeeded Keith Brooks as the Scottish National Party's group leader on the council in 2013.

McEleny was the first of four candidates to announce he was running in the 2016 Scottish National Party depute leadership election and the only one who was not a MP or MEP. He ran on making Scotland a republic if it were independent and promoting more socialist policies in the party such as increasing the highest rate of income tax in Scotland to 50%. He came fourth with 1,182 votes and 3.38% of votes cast. McEleny ran for the position again in the 2018 Scottish National Party depute leadership election but was eliminated in the first round. Though, he was endorsed by MSP Angus MacNeil.

McEleny was successfully granted the right to an employment tribunal in July 2018, claiming he had been unfairly treated by the Ministry of Defence (MOD) whilst working as an electrician at a MOD munitions site in Beith because of his views on independence. McEleny said that he had been suspended and had his security clearance revoked when he first ran for the position of SNP deputy leader. Judge Frances Eccles agreed that his support for Scottish independence met the definition of a "philosophical belief" under the Equality Act 2010 and should be protected from discrimination. McEleny's lawyer Aamer Anwar described it as a "unprecedented legal landmark". The case was later dismissed in November 2019 due to a lack of evidence and the time taken to make his claim.

McEleny received only 199 votes when he stood to be SNP National Secretary in October 2019, losing to incumbent Angus MacLeod who received 774 votes. That same month, he announced that he was stepping down as SNP group leader on Inverclyde Council in early 2020. He unsuccessfully challenged incumbent Stuart McMillan to be the SNP's candidate in Greenock and Inverclyde at the 2021 Scottish Parliament election.

=== Alba Party (2021–2025) ===
In March 2021, he defected to the Alba Party led by former first minister Alex Salmond, becoming the party's first elected representative. He stood as the party's lead candidate in the West Scotland region at the 2021 Scottish Parliament election but was not elected. In June 2021, he was appointed as the party's general secretary. McEleny lost his council seat at the 2022 Inverclyde Council election. He unsuccessfully stood as a candidate for Inverclyde and Renfrewshire West at the 2024 United Kingdom general election winning just 723 votes and losing to Labour's Martin McCluskey. McEleny also lost a subsequent Inverclyde West council by-election caused by McCluskey's resignation as a councillor in which he received just under 9% of the vote.

In February 2025, he was announced he was stepping down as general secretary though it later emerged that he was suspended over allegations of gross misconduct. The month prior, he had been suspended for a week for "disobeying direct orders from leadership and blocking office bearers from carrying out their duties". He was then re-suspended for allegedly misrepresenting the party by making it seem like Alba members agreed with the Scottish Conservatives' policy that those seeking asylum should not receive free bus passes and also stating in a press release that he would support U.S. president Donald Trump if it led to economic benefits in the west of Scotland. McEleny himself filed an unsuccessful complaint against acting leader Kenny MacAskill to have him suspended citing alleged bullying and harassment believed to be from MacAskill's use of the word "fascist" to describe fellow Alba politician Ash Regan who was also running to be leader.

Despite his suspension, McEleny unsuccessfully stood as depute Leader of the Alba Party at the 2025 Alba Party leadership election receiving 22.2% of the vote and losing to former MP Neale Hanvey. He had run alongside Regan who narrowly lost to MacAskill. In May 2025, it was reported that the investigation into McEleny had concluded and that he had been expelled from the Alba Party.

=== Independent (2025–present) ===
In October 2025, BBC News reported that there was a police investigation into the finances of the Alba Party under McEleny's tenure as general secretary. It was also reported that McEleny had launched an unfair dismissal case at an employment tribunal in relation to the party. McEleny was critical of MacAskill's tenure as leader of the party and of his decision to dissolve the party in March 2026 due to financial problems.

In March 2026, it was reported that McEleny had unsuccessfully applied for a communication job at Reform UK. In August 2026, he was appointed as the first Scottish Parliamentary Officer for the Society for the Protection of Unborn Children (SPUC).

== Personal life ==
McEleny is of Irish descent and is a Catholic. His father Jim McEleny served as a councillor for Inverclyde Central from 2017 to 2022.

McEleny was diagnosed with depression in 2015 and took a leave of absence from work.
