= 2022 Inverclyde Council election =

2022 Scottish local election

- 5 May 2022

All 22 seats to Inverclyde Council 12 seats needed for a majority
	First party	Second party
Leader	Stephen McCabe	Elizabeth Robertson
Party	Labour	SNP
Leader's seat	Inverclyde East	Inverclyde North
Last election	8 seats, 26.9%	7 seats, 32.8%
Seats before	8	5
Seats won	9	8
Seat change	▲1	▲1
Popular vote	7,491	8,694
Percentage	32.5%	37.7%
Swing	▲5.6%	▲4.9%
	Third party	Fourth party
Leader	Various	David Wilson
Party	Independent	Conservative
Leader's seat	Various	Inverclyde East
Last election	4 seats, 16.7%	2 seats, 17.6%
Seats before	4	2
Seats won	3	2
Seat change	▼1	Steady
Popular vote	3,455	2,372
Percentage	15.0%	10.3%
Swing	▼1.7%	▼7.3%
- Results of the 2022 Inverclyde Council election
Council Leader before election
Stephen McCabe
Labour
Council Leader after election
Stephen McCabe
Labour

The 2022 Inverclyde Council election took place on 5 May 2022, as part of the 2022 Scottish local elections on the same day as the 31 other Scottish local authorities were up for election. The election used the 7 wards created under the Local Governance (Scotland) Act 2004, last changed in 2017, with 22 councillors being elected. Each ward elected either 3 or 4 members, using the STV electoral system.

At the previous election in 2017, the Labour Party won the most seats and formed a minority administration. The same happened at this election in 2022, with Stephen McCabe continuing as leader of the council after the election.

== Background ==
=== Retiring councillors ===
Ward	Party	Retiring councillor
Inverclyde West	Independent	Ronald Ahlfeld
Inverclyde North	Labour	Martin Brennan
Inverclyde South West	Labour	Gerry Dorrian
Inverclyde South West	Liberal Democrats	Ciano Rebecchi

== Results ==
2022 Inverclyde Council election result
Party	Seats	Gains	Losses	Net gain/loss	Seats %	Votes %	Votes	+/−
Labour	9	1	0	▲1	40.9	32.5	7,491	▲5.6
SNP	8	1	0	▲1	36.4	37.7	8,694	▲4.9
Independent	3	0	1	▼1	13.6	15.0	3,455	▼1.7
Conservative	2	0	0	Steady	9.0	10.3	2,372	▼7.3
Liberal Democrats	0	0	1	▼1	0.0	3.2	734	▼2.7
Alba	0	0	0	Steady	0.0	1.5	342	New

Note: "Votes" are the first preference votes. The net gain/loss and percentage changes relate to the result of the previous Scottish local elections on 5 May 2017. This may differ from other published sources showing gain/loss relative to seats held at dissolution of council.

=== Inverclyde East ===
- 2017: 1xCon; 1xSNP; 1xLab
- 2022: 1xCon; 1xSNP; 1xLab
- 2017-2022: Unchanged.

Inverclyde East - 3 seats
Party	Candidate	Votes	%
SNP	Christopher Curley (incumbent)	Unopposed	
Labour	Stephen McCabe (incumbent)	Unopposed	
Conservative	David Wilson (incumbent)	Unopposed	

=== Inverclyde East Central ===
Inverclyde East Central - 3 seats
Party	Candidate	FPv%	Count				
Party	Candidate	FPv%	1	2	3	4	5
Labour	Robert Moran (incumbent)	31.5	1,016				
SNP	Kirsty Law	22.3	720	738.51	747.75	761.36	1,301.91
SNP	Jim MacLeod (incumbent)	19.6	633	657.48	669.92	682.56	
Independent	Drew McKenzie (incumbent)	16.8	543	603.48	615.18	718.08	843.69
Conservative	James Kelly	8.6	277	296.95	300.46		
Alba	Louise Williams	1.2	38	45.82			
Electorate: 8,065 Valid: 3,227 Spoilt: 69 Quota: 807 Turnout: 40.9%

=== Inverclyde Central ===
Inverclyde Central - 3 seats
Party	Candidate	FPv%	Count				
Party	Candidate	FPv%	1	2	3	4	5
SNP	Pam Armstrong	34.2	968				
Labour	Michael McCormick (incumbent)	26.6	753				
Labour	Colin Jackson (incumbent)	21.2	599	617.26	651.09	675.42	782.88
SNP	Agnes McAuley	8.2	231	450.44	452.03	509.05	516.11
Conservative	Ian Bryson	6.0	169	170.07	171.09	176.36	
Alba	Jim McEleny (incumbent)	3.8	108	115.79	117.82		
Electorate: 7,787 Valid: 2,828 Spoilt: 108 Quota: 708 Turnout: 2,936 (37.7%)

=== Inverclyde North ===
Inverclyde North - 4 seats
Party	Candidate	FPv%	Count							
Party	Candidate	FPv%	1	2	3	4	5	6	7	8
Labour	Francesca Brennan	25.5	1,284							
SNP	Elizabeth Robertson (incumbent)	22.3	1,122							
Conservative	Graeme Brooks (incumbent)	15.1	761	787.77	789.08	791.4	800.40	886.52	995.77	1,018
SNP	Jenn Scott-McClafferty	12.0	606	615.64	713.63	738.14	744.36	766.40	826.21	
Labour	Jim Clocherty (incumbent)	10.4	526	716.4	719.52	728.94	733.46	799.36	862.95	1,138.36
Liberal Democrats	Jacci Stoyle	6.2	312	323.34	325.06	330.06	336.92			
Independent	Gillian Maxwell	5.7	285	295.92	298.94	309.57	347.98			
Independent	John Davidson *	1.5	75	77.1	78.51	85.82				
Alba	Philomena Donnachie	1.4	70	71.5	73.32	74.3				
Electorate: 10,353 Valid: 5,041 Spoilt: 128 Quota: 1,009 Turnout: 5,169 (49.9%)

- = Running under The Pensioner's Party

=== Inverclyde West ===
Inverclyde West - 3 seats
Party	Candidate	FPv%	Count
Party	Candidate	FPv%	1
Independent	Lynne Quinn (incumbent)	30.2	1,440
SNP	Sandra Reynolds	26.6	1,271
Labour	Martin McCluskey	26.1	1,247
Conservative	Ted Runciman	9.5	453
Liberal Democrats	John Burleigh	3.6	171
Alba	Christopher McEleny (incumbent)	2.6	126
Independent	William Wilson	1.4	66
Electorate: 8,773 Valid: 4,774 Quota: 1,194 Turnout: 4,804 (54.8%)

=== Inverclyde South West ===
Inverclyde South West - 3 seats
Party	Candidate	FPv%	Count					
Party	Candidate	FPv%	1	2	3	4	5	6
SNP	James Daisley	29.7	1,206					
Labour	Paul Cassidy	28.9	1,175					
SNP	Innes Nelson (incumbent)	14.9	606	755.66	774.88	815.79	925.97	1,057.69
Conservative	Lisa Dallas	12.5	507	510.15	540.6	632.83	727.67	
Independent	Paul Travers	7.8	316	326.56	343.87	411.97		
Liberal Democrats	Alasdair Higgins	6.2	251	259.82	306.77			
Electorate: 9,531 Valid: 4,061 Spoilt: 59 Quota: 1,016 Turnout: 4,120 (43.2%.)

=== Inverclyde South ===
Inverclyde South - 3 seats
Party	Candidate	FPv%	Count			
Party	Candidate	FPv%	1	2	3	4
SNP	John Crowther (incumbent)	30.8	972			
Labour	Natasha McGuire (incumbent, (elected in 2017 as Natasha Murphy))	28.2	891			
Independent	Tommy McVey (incumbent)	23.1	730	743.12	777.91	915.99
SNP	Irene McLeod	11.4	359	506.55	521.51	528.05
Conservative	Georgina Halfnight	6.5	205	207.25	220.06	
Electorate: 7,877 Valid: 3,157 Spoilt: 62 Quota: 790 Turnout: 3,219 (40.9%)

== Aftermath ==
On 17 May 2022, Labour announced that it had secured enough support from independent councillors to form a new minority administration. Council Leader Stephen McCabe said: "I am delighted that after a week of discussions and negotiations with the other groups on the council I have been able to secure sufficient cross-group support for Inverclyde Labour to lead the next administration." Also, as part of the deal, Drew McKenzie became Inverclyde Council's first Independent Provost, with all previous Provosts being either Labour or Lib Dem councillors.

=== Inverclyde West by-election ===
On 3 September 2024, Labour councillor Martin McCluskey announced that he was resigning as a councillor after being elected as the Member of Parliament for the Inverclyde and Renfrewshire West constituency at the 2024 United Kingdom general election. A by-election was scheduled for 7 November 2024. The by-election was won by the Labour candidate Ian Hellyer.

Inverclyde West by-election (7 November 2024) - 1 seat
Party	Candidate	FPv%	Count				
Party	Candidate	FPv%	1	2	3	4	5
Labour	Ian Hellyer	34.0	932	961	999	1,165	1,568
SNP	Robert Kirkpatrick	33.7	923	939	1,050	1,082	
Conservative	Ted Runciman	15.2	415	485	515		
Alba	Christopher McEleny	8.7	239	258			
Reform	John Burleigh	8.4	230				
Electorate: 8,775 Valid: 2,739 Spoilt: 19 Quota: 1,370 Turnout: 31.4%
