= 2018 Scottish National Party depute leadership election =

- 18 May – 8 June 2018
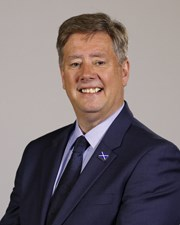

Candidate	Keith Brown	Julie Hepburn	Chris McEleny
First round	18,915 (46.3%)	15,150 (37.1%)	6,809 (16.7%)
Second round	22,562 (55.2%)	18,312 (44.8%)	Eliminated
Depute Leader before election
Angus Robertson (Note: Robertson resigned as Depute Leader on 3 February 2018.)
Elected Depute Leader
Keith Brown

The Scottish National Party depute leadership election ran from 18 May to 8 June 2018. The election was contested for the party's new depute leader following the resignation of Angus Robertson in February 2018, after he lost his Westminster seat in the 2017 snap election.

Keith Brown was announced as the winner of the election on 8 June 2018.

== Procedure ==
Ballots opened on 18 May. The winner was announced as Keith Brown at the SNP conference in Aberdeen on 8 June.

== Candidates ==
Nominations closed on 13 April 2018, there were three candidates:

- Keith Brown Member of the Scottish Parliament for Clackmannanshire and Dunblane and Cabinet Secretary for Economy, Jobs and Fair Work
- Julie Hepburn, the only candidate who is not an elected representative
- Chris McEleny, a councillor who ran in the last depute leadership election

=== Withdrew ===
- James Dornan, Member of the Scottish Parliament for Glasgow Cathcart who withdrew his candidacy on 8 April. He threw his support behind candidate Julie Hepburn.

=== Declined ===
- Pete Wishart
- Joanna Cherry
- Tommy Sheppard
- Ian Blackford
- Philippa Whitford

== Campaign ==
The status of a second Scottish independence referendum was considered as a significant issue surrounding the depute leadership election, with Chris McEleny and Julie Hepburn seen as supporters of such a referendum occurring earlier rather than later.

== Endorsements ==
=== Keith Brown ===
- Clare Adamson
- Ash Denham
- Annabelle Ewing
- Margaret Ferrier
- Ben MacPherson
- Ivan McKee
- Gil Paterson
- Humza Yousaf

=== Chris McEleny ===
- Angus McNeil

=== Julie Hepburn ===
- Aileen Campbell
- James Dornan
- Bob Doris
- Fulton MacGregor
- Gillian Martin
- Alison Thewliss
- Kirsten Oswald
- Sandra White

== Results ==
The depute leadership election was conducted using the single transferable vote system, with the results being declared on 8 June. Keith Brown was elected as the new Depute Leader of the Scottish National Party with a majority of 55.2% of votes cast in the second round of voting, beating rival candidate Julie Hepburn who secured 44.8%. Candidate Chris McEleny finished third with 16.2%, having been eliminated in the first round of voting.
