= Notre Dame High School, Greenock =

Notre Dame High School
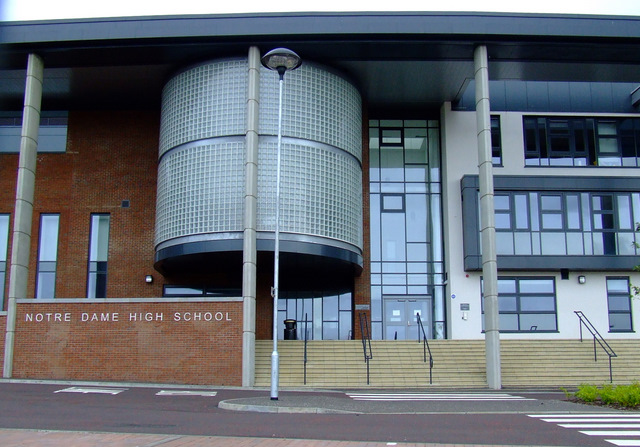
- School Badge The new Notre Dame High School, August 2011

Location
- Dunlop Street, Greenock, Inverclyde, PA16 9BJ; Scotland; 55.941280°N 4.778660°W

Information
- Type: 11–18 Roman Catholic secondary school
- Motto: Mon Ame Exalte Le Seigneur
- Religious affiliation: Roman Catholic
- Local authority: Inverclyde Council
- Head teacher: Anne Munro
- Grades: S1–S6
- Gender: Boys and girls
- Age range: 11–18
- Enrollment: 903 (2023–24)
- Color
- Website: Notre Dame High School

Notre Dame High School is an 11–18 Roman Catholic secondary school situated in the town of Greenock in the Inverclyde area of Scotland. During 2023–2024, the school had a roll of 903 pupils, serving the central, west and east areas of Greenock. The incumbent Head Teacher, Anne Munro, was appointed to the position in August 2021.

== History ==
Notre Dame High School opened in 1973 and was situated on Peat Road in Greenock. The school later served in another three locations – Dunlop Street and Dempster Street, before moving back to Dunlop Street in 2011 following the completion of a new £29 million new building constructed to replace the former Notre Dame High School on Dempster Street. The construction of the replacement school began in 2009 and was designed by architecture firm Archial. The project was funded via a Public–private partnership (PPP) agreement between the Scottish Government and Inverclyde Council. The new school building was constructed to accommodate a total of 850 pupils.

The school celebrated its 40th anniversary in June 2013 by holding a special mass at St Patrick's Church in Greenock as an opportunity for former pupils and staff to gather to reminisce about the schools history.

== Overview ==
=== Attainment and achievement ===
During the 2023–2024 academic year, the number of pupils in Fifth year (S5) or Sixth year (S6) attaining a National 5 qualification increased. The percentage of pupils attaining at least one National 5 qualification in Fourth year (S4) consistently ranks above the local authority average. In 2019, 87.04% of pupils attending Notre Dame High School in S4 achieved at least one qualification at National 5 (Level 5) against the local authority average of 81.6%. In the subsequent years, the percentage remained higher that the local authority average, with 89.77% in 2020, 83.23% in 2021, 85.81% in 2022, 91.61% in 2023 and 88.21% in 2024. Pupils in S4 who achieved a total of five National 5 qualifications in 2019 stood at 32.10%, slightly below the Inverclyde Council average of 34.1%. Between 2019–2022, the number of pupils achieving five qualifications at National 5 remained lower the local authority average before increasing 2023 and 2024 to exceed the local authority average.

Pupils attending the school in S5 following a similar pattern to S4 pupils, with the percentage of pupils in S5 attaining at least one qualification at Higher (Level 6) being above the local authority average between 2019–2024. Between 2019–2021, the percentage of S5 pupils achieving three Higher qualifications was above the local authority average, before decreasing in 2022 to 33.5% against the local authority average of 36% and 30.9% in 2023 against a local authority average of 33.8%. In 2024, the school increased its percentage of S5 pupils attaining three Higher qualifications to exceed the local authority average. The number of pupils in S5 achieving five Higher qualifications had mostly been in line or above the local authority average since 2019.

=== Primary transition ===
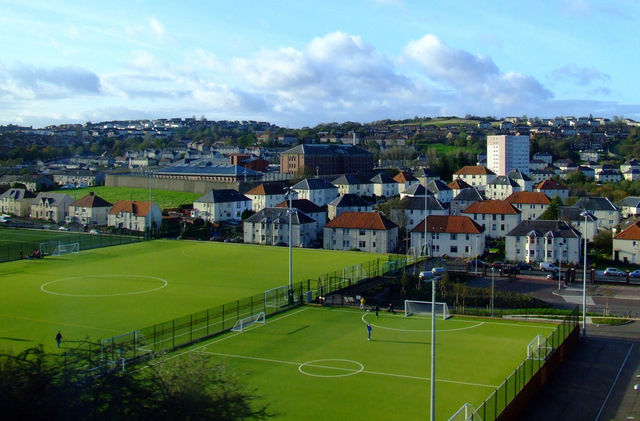
The sports pitches at Notre Dame High School

The associated primary schools in which pupils in Primary 7 (P7) transition to Notre Dame High School are St Mary’s Primary School, St Patrick’s Primary School and All Saints Primary School. As part of the transition process to Notre Dame High School, regular visits are conducted to the schools associated primary schools during the course of the academic year (August–June) by members of school staff whilst some of the primary pupils of the associated primary schools participate in the Notre Dame High School orchestra and junior band.

=== Catholic practices ===
As a Roman Catholic secondary school, pupils participate in a prayer each day before the commencement of the school day. The school celebrates mass within the school Oratory each Thursday of each week, with this increasing to two times a week during Lent and Advent. All pupils within Notre Dame High School celebrate mass on Holy Days of Obligation and special devotion days such as Ash Wednesday. The school is allocated its own School Chaplain, currently Father Eoin Patton of St Laurence’s Parish.

Parents of children attending Notre Dame High School have the right under Scots law to withdraw their child from the corporate acts, worship or religious instruction that is practiced within the school. In order for any child to be excluded from religious practice, agreement must first be sought by the schools Head Teacher.

== Alumni ==
- Chris McEleny (born 1985 or 1986), politician
- Luke McCowan (born 1997), footballer

== See also ==
- Catholic schools in the United Kingdom
- Catholic school
- List of schools in Scotland
