= Larkfield =

Larkfield may refer to several places:

- Larkfield, Kent, England
- Larkfield (electoral ward), of Chepstow, Wales.
- the former Larkfield (Northern Ireland Parliament constituency) under the Northern Ireland Parliament constituency, abolished in 1973
- Larkfield-Wikiup, California (United States of America)
- Larkfield, Greenock is the largest council housing estate in Greenock, Scotland.
