= Inverclyde Council =

Unitary authority council in Inverclyde, Scotland

Inverclyde Council Comhairle Inbhir Chluaidh
- Coat of arms

- Council logo

Type
- Type: Unitary authority

History
- Preceded by: Inverclyde District Council

Leadership
- Provost: Drew McKenzie, Independent since 5 May 2022
- Leader: Stephen McCabe, Labour since 6 March 2025
- Chief Executive: Stuart Jamieson since May 2025

Structure
- Seats: 22 councillors
- Graph of the party split among 22 seats.
- Political groups: Administration (9) Labour (9) Other parties (13) SNP (6) Conservative (2) Independent (5)
- Length of term: 5 years

Elections
- Voting system: Single transferable vote
- Last election: 5 May 2022
- Next election: 6 May 2027

Meeting place
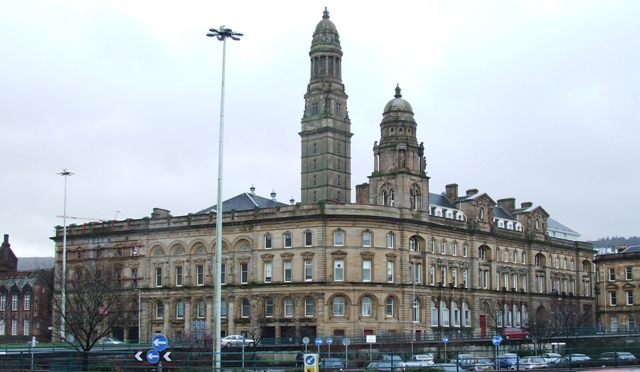
- Municipal Buildings, Clyde Square, Greenock, PA15 1LX

Website
- www.inverclyde.gov.uk

Inverclyde Council (Scottish Gaelic: Comhairle Inbhir Chluaidh) is one of the 32 local authorities of Scotland, covering the Inverclyde council area. In its current form the council was created in 1996, replacing the previous Inverclyde District Council which existed from 1975 to 1996.

The council has been under no overall control since 2007, being led by a Labour minority administration. The council is based at the Municipal Buildings in Greenock, the area's largest town.

== History ==
Prior to 1975 the area was the western part of the historic county of Renfrewshire. The Local Government (Scotland) Act 1973 replaced Scotland's counties, burghs and districts with a two-tier system comprising upper-tier regions and lower-tier districts. Inverclyde was created as one of nineteen districts within the Strathclyde region. Further reforms in 1996 under the Local Government etc. (Scotland) Act 1994 saw the Strathclyde Regional Council abolished and Inverclyde become a council area, taking over the former regional council's roles in the area.

In 2005, the council was criticised by the Accounts Commission for poor leadership and accountability. The chief executive resigned and various changes to the council's internal structures were made in response.

Until 2007, Inverclyde was the last authority in the United Kingdom not to have named its wards; whilst the local authority reserved its right to name wards, it did not to supply any names to the Local Government Boundary Commission. This was rectified in the 2006 review leading to the new wards used for the 2007 election, although the six multi-member wards created then used only vague geographical descriptions ('Inverclyde North', 'Inverclyde East', 'Inverclyde South West' etc.), in contrast to the majority of wards in Scotland.

== Political control ==
The council has been under no overall control since 2007, since when it has been led by Labour-led minority administrations.

The first election to Inverclyde District Council was held in 1974, initially operating as a shadow authority alongside the outgoing authorities until the new system came into force on 16 May 1975. A shadow authority was again elected in 1995 ahead of the reforms which came into force on 1 April 1996. Political control of the council since 1975 has been as follows:

Inverclyde District Council

Party in control	Years
Labour	1975–1977
Liberal	1977–1980
Labour	1980–1996

Inverclyde Council

Party in control	Years
Labour	1996–2000
No overall control	2000–2003
Liberal Democrats	2003–2007
No overall control	2007–

=== Leadership ===
The role of provost is largely ceremonial in Inverclyde. They chair full council meetings and act as the council's civic figurehead. Political leadership is provided by the leader of the council. The first leader of Inverclyde Council, Harry Mulholland, had been the last leader of the old Inverclyde District Council. The leaders since 1996 have been:

Councillor	Party	From	To
Harry Mulholland	Labour	1 Apr 1996	May 1999
Robert Jackson	Labour	20 May 1999	May 2003
Alan Blair	Liberal Democrats	15 May 2003	May 2007
Stephen McCabe	Labour	24 May 2007	Feb 2011
Iain McKenzie	Labour	24 Feb 2011	Aug 2011
Stephen McCabe	Labour	18 Aug 2011	15 Nov 2024
Robert Moran	Labour	5 Dec 2024	6 Mar 2025
Stephen McCabe	Labour	6 Mar 2025	

=== Composition ===
Following the 2022 election and subsequent by-elections and changes of allegiance up to October 2026, the composition of the council was:

Party	Seats
Labour	9
SNP	6
Conservative	2
Independent	5
Total	22

The next election is due in 2027.

=== Premises ===
The council is based at the Municipal Buildings on Clyde Square in Greenock. The main building was built in 1886 for the former Greenock Town Council, although the complex also incorporates the earlier Greenock Town Hall of 1765. The buildings passed to Inverclyde District Council at the local government reorganisation in 1975, and then to Inverclyde Council when local government was reorganised again in 1996.

== Elections ==
Since 2007 elections have been held every five years under the single transferable vote system, introduced by the Local Governance (Scotland) Act 2004. Election results since 1995 have been as follows:

Year	Seats	Labour	SNP	Conservative	Liberal Democrats	Independent / Other	Notes
1995	20	14	0	1	5	0	Labour majority
1999	20	11	0	1	8	0	New ward boundaries. Labour majority
2003	20	6	0	0	13	1	Lib Dem majority
2007	20	9	5	1	4	1	New ward boundaries.
2012	20	10	6	1	2	1	
2017	22	8	7	2	1	4	New ward boundaries.
2022	22	9	8	2	0	3	

=== Wards ===
Map of the council's ward boundaries as of 2017

Six multi-member wards (20 seats) were created for the 2007 election, replacing 20 single-member wards which had been in place since the 1980s. The representation was increased to 22 councillors across 7 seats for the 2017 election:

Ward number	Ward name	Location	Seats	Population (2019)
1	Inverclyde East (Note: Inverclyde East is primarily Kilmacolm plus eastern Port Glasgow (Park Farm etc) and an extensive rural hinterland at Strathgryffe.)		3	11,340
2	Inverclyde East Central (Note: Inverclyde East Central covers the majority of Port Glasgow plus Gibshill.)		3	9,512
3	Inverclyde Central (Note: Inverclyde Central covers eastern Greenock and a rural hinterland at Gryffe Reservoirs; created for the 2017 election.)		3	11,926
4	Inverclyde North (Note: Inverclyde North covers northern and central Greenock.)		4	13,759
5	Inverclyde West (Note: Inverclyde West covers Gourock.)		3	10,411
6	Inverclyde South West (Note: Inverclyde South West is primarily Inverkip and Wemyss Bay plus south-western Greenock (Larkfield etc) and a rural hinterland at Loch Thom.)		3	11,649
7	Inverclyde South (Note: Inverclyde South covers southern Greenock.)		3	9,203
Total			22	77,800
