= Inverclyde East Central (ward) =

Electoral ward in Inverclyde, Scotland

Location of the ward

Inverclyde East Central is one of the seven wards used to elect members of the Inverclyde Council. It elects three Councillors.

The ward includes the majority of Port Glasgow, except the Bardrainney, Broadfield, Park Farm and Woodhall neighbourhoods in the east of the town which are part of the Inverclyde East ward. The modern residential developments at Kingston Dock / 4 Quays which straddle the border between Port Glasgow and Greenock is also within the Inverclyde East Central ward, as is the Gibshill neighbourhood which also adjoins The Port but was always considered to belong to Greenock. In 2019, the ward had a population of 9,512.

== Councillors ==
Election	Councillors		
2007	Jim Grieve (SNP)	Michael McCormick (Labour)	Robert Moran (Labour)
2012	Jim Grieve (SNP)	Michael McCormick (Labour)	Robert Moran (Labour)
2017	Jim MacLeod (SNP)	Drew McKenzie (Ind.)	Robert Moran (Labour)
2022	Kirsty Law ([Independent])	Drew McKenzie (Ind.)	Robert Moran (Labour)

== Election results ==
=== 2022 Election ===
2022 Inverclyde Council election

Inverclyde East Central - 3 seats
Party	Candidate	FPv%	Count				
Party	Candidate	FPv%	1	2	3	4	5
Labour	Robert Moran (incumbent)		1,016				
SNP	Kirsty Law		720	738.51	747.75	761.36	1,301.91
SNP	Jim MacLeod (incumbent)		633	657.48	669.92	682.56	
Independent	Drew McKenzie (incumbent)		543	603.48	615.18	718.08	843.69
Conservative	James Kelly		277	296.95	300.46		
Alba	Louise Williams		38	45.82			
Electorate: 8,065 Valid: 3,269 Spoilt: 69 Quota: 807 Turnout: 40.9%

=== 2017 Election ===
2017 Inverclyde Council election

Inverclyde East Central - 3 seats
Party	Candidate	FPv%	Count					
Party	Candidate	FPv%	1	2	3	4	5	6
Labour	Robert Moran (incumbent)	32.33	1,193					
SNP	Jim MacLeod *	28.35	1,046					
Conservative	Iain MacLeod	15.58	575	603.52	604.57	629.76	655.21	
Independent	Drew McKenzie	12.74	470	539.25	550.19	581.21	795.45	1,059.19
SNP	Donna Pickett	9.29	343	367.9	461.03	472.1		
Liberal Democrats	Robbie Henderson	1.71	63	89.71	92.99			
Electorate: TBC Valid: 3,690 Spoilt: 93 Quota: 923 Turnout: 3,783 (47.6%)

=== 2012 Election ===
2012 Inverclyde Council election

Inverclyde East Central - 3 seats
Party	Candidate	FPv%	Count				
Party	Candidate	FPv%	1	2	3	4	5
Labour	Michael McCormick (incumbent)	42.4	1,689				
SNP	Jim Grieve (incumbent)	22.3	890	925.6	945.9	953.2	1,003.8
Labour	Robert Moran (incumbent)	14.5	612	1,134.4			
Independent	Drew McKenzie	14.5	592	638.7	685.6	702.3	741.6
Liberal Democrats	Robert Burns	2.7	106	117.1	125.8	136.9	
Conservative	Harry Osborn	2.5	96	98.5	100.7		
Electorate: 10,222 Valid: 3,985 Spoilt: 117 Quota: 997 Turnout: 4,102 (40.13%)

=== 2007 Election ===
2007 Inverclyde Council election

Inverclyde East Central
Party	Candidate	FPv%	%	Seat	Count
Labour	Michael McCormick	2,065	43.5	1	1
SNP	Jim Grieve	1,132	23.8	2	2
Labour	Robert Moran	551	11.6	3	2
Liberal Democrats	Jean Stewart	425	9.0		
Conservative	Graeme Brooks	234	4.9		
Independent	Robert Kyle	188	4.0		
Independent	Tommy Murray	95	2.0		
Solidarity	Don Shearer	57	1.2		
