= Stephen McCabe =

British politician

Councillor Stephen McCabe

Leader of Inverclyde Council
- Incumbent
- Assumed office 6 March 2025
- Preceded by: Robert Moran
- In office 19 August 2011 – 15 Nov 2024
- Preceded by: Iain McKenzie
- Succeeded by: Robert Moran
- In office 24 May 2007 – February 2011
- Preceded by: Alan Blair
- Succeeded by: Iain McKenzie

Councillor, Inverclyde Council
- Incumbent
- Assumed office 3 May 2007 Serving with Cllrs David Wilson, Jim MacLeod, James McColgan
- Constituency: Inverclyde East

Personal details
- Party: Scottish Labour

Stephen McCabe is a Labour Party councillor and leader of Inverclyde Council.

A graduate of the University of Strathclyde where he studied economics, he has been a councillor since 1999, retaining his seat as the sole representative for 'Ward 6' in 2003. When larger, multi-member wards were created for the 2007 election, he stood successfully in Inverclyde East (covering Kilmacolm and eastern parts of Port Glasgow) and was re-elected there in 2012, 2017 and 2022.

He was leader of the local authority between May 2007 and February 2011, when he stepped down for family reasons, but was soon re-elected to the position in August of the same year, following the death of local MP David Cairns which in turn led to McCabe's successor Iain McKenzie being elected to Westminster in the 2011 Inverclyde by-election.

McCabe was arrested on 4 November 2024, on suspicion of assault. On 15 November 2024 Mccabe was charged with assault and threatening and abusive behaviour. He resigned as leader of the council later that day. The assault charge was dropped in March 2025 and McCabe was reappointed as leader later that month, replacing Robert Moran who had been elected to the role in December 2024.

It was revealed in August 2025 that McCabe had broken rules by not declaring that his landlord was Willie Haughey, a Labour peer in the House of Lords.
