= 2016 Scottish National Party depute leadership election =

Party election in Scotland

- 13–15 October 2016
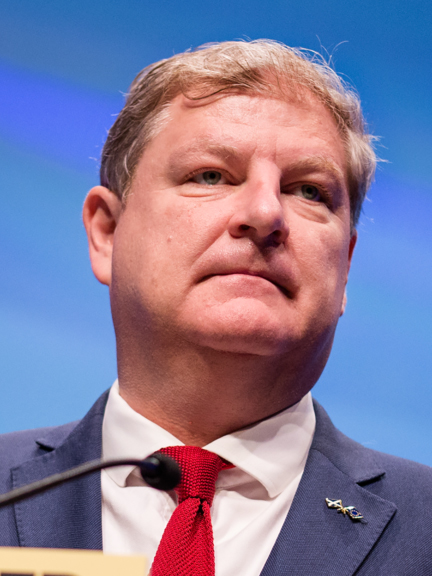

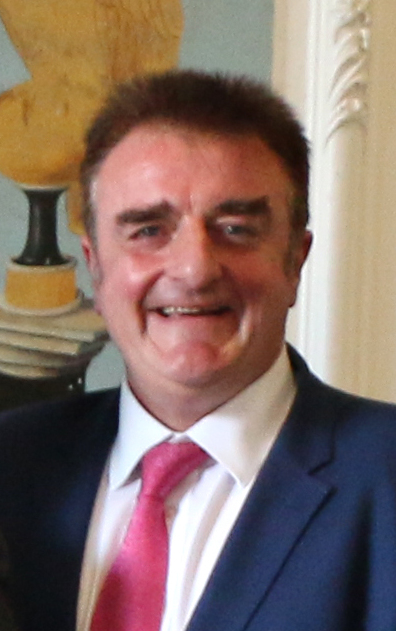

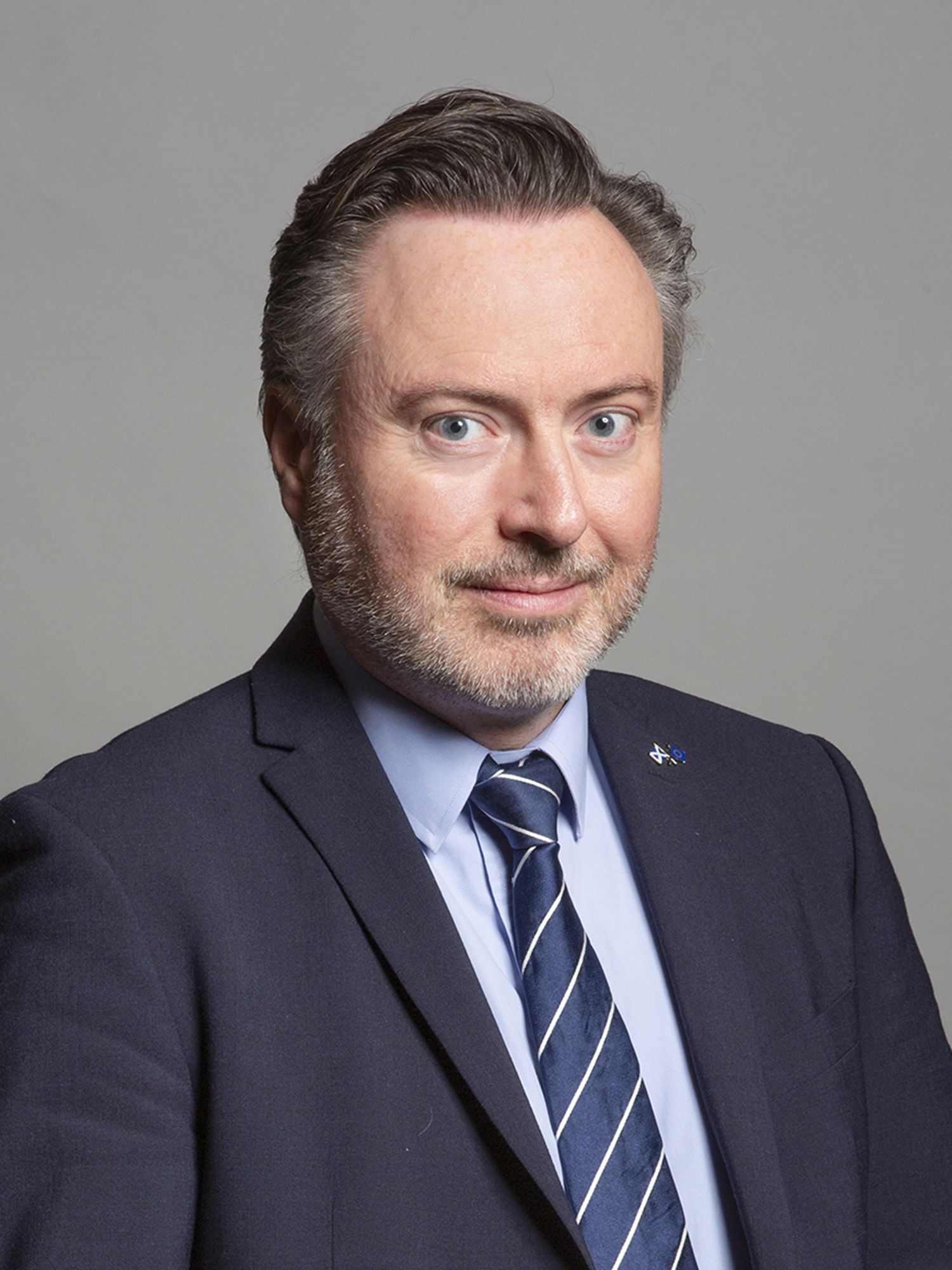
Candidate	Angus Robertson	Tommy Sheppard
Popular vote	18,736	8,936
Percentage	52.5%	25.5%
Candidate	Alyn Smith	Chris McEleny
Popular vote	6,510	1,182
Percentage	18.6%	3.4%
Depute Leader before election
Stewart Hosie
Elected Depute Leader
Angus Robertson

There was a Scottish National Party leadership election to choose the new Depute leader of the Scottish National Party at the SNP's conference on 14–15 October 2016. The SNP's Westminster Group Leader Angus Robertson MP won the election.

The election followed the resignation of the incumbent Depute Leader Stewart Hosie. Hosie, the partner of Scottish Government cabinet member Shona Robison, announced his intention to step down at the party conference in May 2016 after it emerged he was engaged in an affair with a freelance journalist, who had previously been involved in an affair with the SNP MP Angus MacNeil.

== Campaigns ==
Four candidates took part in the election:

- Angus Robertson MP
- Alyn Smith MEP
- Tommy Sheppard MP
- Inverclyde Councillor Chris McEleny

Alyn Smith's campaign focused on the dual issues of strengthening Scotland's relationship with the European Union following the Brexit vote, and the need for a new Yes movement centred around the SNP.

Angus Robertson's campaign also focused on the issues of Brexit and the European Union, and particularly on preserving Scotland's place in Europe.

Chris McEleny's campaign focused on the importance of local government in light of the upcoming 2017 Scottish local elections.

Tommy Sheppard focused his campaign on revamping internal SNP policy making, with the intention of making policy decision making more open to the SNP party membership. Existing policy decisions are largely taken by the leadership, with minimal input from the SNP grassroots membership. He has been described as Robertson's "left-wing challenger".

Both McEleny and Sheppard are members of the SNP Socialists group, which said it was "challenging for leadership" of the SNP.

Other individuals suggested as potential candidates included Mhairi Black, Humza Yousaf, and Tasmina Ahmed-Sheikh. Humza Yousaf later ruled out running for the position, instead stating his support for Robertson.

== Results ==
The election used the single transferable vote (STV) system.

Candidate	Votes	
Candidate	Votes	%
Angus Robertson ✓	18,736	52.5%
Tommy Sheppard	8,936	25.5%
Alyn Smith	6,510	18.6%
Chris McEleny	1,182	3.4%

== Endorsements ==
=== Angus Robertson ===
- George Adam, MSP for Paisley
- Alasdair Allan, MSP for Na h-Eileanan an Iar, Minister for International Development and Europe
- Tom Arthur, MSP for Renfrewshire South
- Hannah Bardell, MP for Livingston, spokesperson on Business, Innovation and Skills
- Kirsty Blackman, MP for Aberdeen North, spokesperson on the House of Lords
- Ian Blackford, MP for Ross, Skye and Lochaber, spokesperson on Pensions
- Deidre Brock, MP for Edinburgh North and Leith, spokesperson on Devolved Government Relations
- Martin Compston, actor
- Joanna Cherry QC, MP for Edinburgh South West, spokesperson on Justice and Home Affairs
- Cllr Stuart Currie, Leader of SNP Group on East Lothian Council and Secretary of COSLA SNP Group
- Martyn Day, MP for Linlithgow and East Falkirk
- Graeme Dey, MSP for Angus South
- Martin Docherty, MP for West Dunbartonshire
- Stuart Donaldson, MP for West Aberdeenshire and Kincardine
- Mairi Evans, MSP for Angus North and Mearns
- Fergus Ewing, MSP for Inverness and Nairn, Cabinet Secretary for the Rural Economy and Connectivity
- Joe FitzPatrick, MSP for Dundee City West, Minister for Parliamentary Business
- Kate Forbes, MSP for Skye, Lochaber and Badenoch
- Kenneth Gibson, MSP for Cunninghame North
- Patricia Gibson, MP for North Ayrshire and Arran
- Toni Giugliano, former SNP candidate for Edinburgh Western in the 2016 Scottish Parliament election
- Drew Hendry, MP for Inverness, Nairn, Badenoch and Strathspey, spokesperson on Transport
- Richard Lochhead, MSP for Moray
- Gordon MacDonald, MSP for Edinburgh Pentlands
- Rona Mackay, MSP for Strathkelvin and Bearsden
- Ruth Maguire, MSP for Cunninghame South
- Gillian Martin, MSP for Aberdeenshire East
- Callum McCaig, MP for Aberdeen South, spokesperson on Energy and Climate Change
- Mark McDonald, MSP for Aberdeen Donside, Minister for Childcare and Early Years
- Paul Monaghan, MP for Caithness, Sutherland and Easter Ross
- Rob Munn, former councillor for Leith ward and Deputy Lord Provost, City of Edinburgh Council
- John Nicolson, MP for East Dunbartonshire, spokesperson on Culture, Media and Sport
- Gavin Newlands, MP for Paisley and Renfrewshire North
- Brendan O'Hara, MP for Argyll and Bute, spokesperson on Defence
- Gil Paterson, MSP for Clydebank and Milngavie
- Cllr Kirsty Reid, Elgin North ward, Moray Council
- Cllr Maxine Smith, Cromarty Firth ward, Leader of the Opposition on Highland Council
- Stewart Stevenson, MSP for Banffshire and Buchan Coast
- Kevin Stewart, MSP for Aberdeen Central, Minister for Local Government and Housing
- Cllr Joan Sturgeon, Irvine East ward, former Provost of North Ayrshire Council and mother of First Minister Nicola Sturgeon
- Robin Sturgeon, recent by-election candidate for North Ayrshire Council, father of Nicola Sturgeon
- Owen Thompson, MP for Midlothian, former Leader of Midlothian Council
- Cllr Stefan Tymkewycz, Craigentinny/Duddingston ward, City of Edinburgh Council
- Maureen Watt, MSP for Aberdeen South and North Kincardine, Minister for Mental Health
- Mike Weir, MP for Angus, SNP Chief Whip
- Eilidh Whiteford, MP for Banff and Buchan, Secretary of SNP Westminster Group and spokesperson on Social Justice and Welfare
- Kevin Williamson, author and publisher, co-founded pro-independence website Bella Caledonia
- Humza Yousaf, MSP for Glasgow Pollok, Minister for Transport and the Islands

=== Chris McEleny ===
- Jim Sillars, former MP South Ayrshire & Glasgow Govan and former Depute Leader of the SNP
