= 2017 Inverclyde Council election =

2017 Scottish local government election

- 4 May 2017

All 22 seats to Inverclyde Council 12 seats needed for a majority
- Turnout: 48.6%
| | First party | Second party | Third party |
|---|---|---|---|
| Leader | Stephen McCabe | Chris McEleny | Ronald Ahlfeld |
| Party | Labour | SNP | Independent |
| Leader's seat | Inverclyde East | Inverclyde West | Inverclyde West |
| Last election | 10 seats, 44.2% | 6 seats, 25.4% | 1 seat, 11.4% |
| Seats before | 9 | 6 | 2 |
| Seats won | 8 | 7 | 4 |
| Seat change | ▼2 | ▲1 | ▲3 |
| Popular vote | 7,702 | 9,368 | 4,766 |
| Percentage | 26.9% | 32.8% | 16.7% |
| Swing | ▼17.3% | ▲7.4% | ▲5.3% |
| | Fourth party | Fifth party |
| Leader | David Wilson | Ciano Rebecchi |
| Party | Conservative | Liberal Democrats |
| Leader's seat | Inverclyde East | Inverclyde South West |
| Last election | 1 seat, 10.1% | 2 seats, 7.9% |
| Seats before | 1 | 2 |
| Seats won | 2 | 1 |
| Seat change | ▲1 | ▼1 |
| Popular vote | 5,046 | 1,697 |
| Percentage | 17.6% | 5.9% |
| Swing | ▲7.5% | ▼2.0% |
- Results of the 2017 Inverclyde Council election
Council Leader before election
Stephen McCabe
Labour
Council Leader after election
Stephen McCabe
Labour

The 2017 elections to Inverclyde Council were held on 4 May 2017, on the same day as the 31 other local authorities in Scotland. It was the third successive Local Council election to run under the STV Electoral System. The election used seven wards created under the Local Governance (Scotland) Act 2004, with 22 Councillors being elected, an increase of 2 from 2012 and an additional ward. Each ward elected either 3 or 4 members, using the STV electoral system.

Following the 2017 election, the Labour Party won the most seats but not enough to form majority control. At the first full meeting of the council, Labour formed a minority administration with Conservative and Independent support with Martin Brennan elected Provost and Stephen McCabe retaining his position as leader of the council.

== Results ==
2017 Inverclyde Council election result
| Party | Seats | Gains | Losses | Net gain/loss | Seats % | Votes % | Votes | +/− |
|---|---|---|---|---|---|---|---|---|
| Labour | 8 | 0 | 2 | ▼2 | 36.4 | 26.9 | 7,702 | ▼17.3 |
| SNP | 7 | 1 | 0 | ▲1 | 31.8 | 32.8 | 9,368 | ▲7.4 |
| Independent | 4 | 3 | 0 | ▲3 | 18.1 | 16.7 | 4,766 | ▲5.3 |
| Conservative | 2 | 1 | 0 | ▲1 | 9.0 | 17.6 | 5,046 | ▲7.5 |
| Liberal Democrats | 1 | 0 | 1 | ▼1 | 4.5 | 5.9 | 1,697 | ▼2.0 |
| UKIP | 0 | 0 | 0 | Steady | 0.0 | 0.1 | 20 | New |

Note: "Votes" are the first preference votes. The net gain/loss and percentage changes relate to the result of the previous Scottish local elections on 3 May 2012. This may differ from other published sources showing gain/loss relative to seats held at dissolution of Scotland's councils.

== Ward results ==
=== Inverclyde East ===
- 2012: 2xLab; 1xCon; 1xSNP
- 2017: 1xCon; 1xSNP; 1xLab
- 2012-2017: Ward changed to 3 councillors. Labour lose 1 seat.

Inverclyde East - 3 seats
| Party | Candidate | FPv% | Count | |
| Party | Candidate | FPv% | 1 | 2 |
|---|---|---|---|---|
| Conservative | David Wilson (incumbent) | 39.98 | 1,767 | |
| SNP | Christopher Curley | 27.01 | 1,194 | |
| Labour | Stephen McCabe (incumbent) | 21.56 | 953 | 1,128.07 |
| Independent | Jim Boyland | 8.05 | 356 | 427.45 |
| Liberal Democrats | Jacci Stoyle | 3.39 | 150 | 318.71 |
Electorate: TBC Valid: 4,420 Spoilt: 52 Quota: 1,106 Turnout: 4,472 (52%)

=== Inverclyde East Central ===
- 2012: 2xLab; 1xSNP
- 2017: 1xSNP; 1xLab; 1xIndependent
- 2012-2017: Independent gain 1 seat from Labour

Inverclyde East Central - 3 seats
| Party | Candidate | FPv% | Count | | | | | |
| Party | Candidate | FPv% | 1 | 2 | 3 | 4 | 5 | 6 |
|---|---|---|---|---|---|---|---|---|
| Labour | Robert Moran (incumbent) | 32.33 | 1,193 | | | | | |
| SNP | Jim MacLeod * | 28.35 | 1,046 | | | | | |
| Conservative | Iain MacLeod | 15.58 | 575 | 603.52 | 604.57 | 629.76 | 655.21 | |
| Independent | Drew McKenzie | 12.74 | 470 | 539.25 | 550.19 | 581.21 | 795.45 | 1,059.19 |
| SNP | Donna Pickett | 9.29 | 343 | 367.9 | 461.03 | 472.1 | | |
| Liberal Democrats | Robbie Henderson | 1.71 | 63 | 89.71 | 92.99 | | | |
Electorate: TBC Valid: 3,690 Spoilt: 93 Quota: 923 Turnout: 3,783 (47.6%)

- = Outgoing Councillor from a different Ward.

=== Inverclyde Central ===
- 2017: 2xLab; 1xSNP
- 2012-2017: New ward

Inverclyde Central - 3 seats
| Party | Candidate | FPv% | Count | | | | |
| Party | Candidate | FPv% | 1 | 2 | 3 | 4 | 5 |
|---|---|---|---|---|---|---|---|
| SNP | Jim McEleny | 32.5 | 973 | | | | |
| Labour | Michael McCormick * | 32.4 | 970 | | | | |
| Labour | Colin Jackson | 14.53 | 435 | 443.52 | 600.95 | 622.37 | 751.33 |
| Conservative | Ian Bryson | 9.22 | 276 | 276.92 | 280.57 | 302.93 | |
| SNP | Jayne Peberdy | 8.52 | 255 | 452.29 | 464.59 | 477.97 | 489.66 |
| Liberal Democrats | Kenny Shepherd * | 2.84 | 85 | 87.3 | 94.36 | | |
Electorate: TBC Valid: 2,994 Spoilt: 128 Quota: 749 Turnout: 3,122 (41.1%)

- = Outgoing Councillor from a different Ward.

=== Inverclyde North ===
- 2012: 2xLab; 1xSNP; 1xLib Dem
- 2017: 2xLab; 1xCon; 1xSNP
- 2012-2017: Conservative gain from Liberal Democrats

Inverclyde North - 4 seats
| Party | Candidate | FPv% | Count | | | | | |
| Party | Candidate | FPv% | 1 | 2 | 3 | 4 | 5 | 6 |
|---|---|---|---|---|---|---|---|---|
| Labour | Martin Brennan (incumbent) | 24.74 | 1,279 | | | | | |
| Conservative | Graeme Brooks | 19.27 | 996 | 1,015.92 | 1,111.6 | | | |
| SNP | Elizabeth Robertson | 16.72 | 864 | 871.28 | 891.47 | 893.59 | 957.12 | 1,687.09 |
| SNP | Philomena Donnachie | 15.52 | 802 | 812.15 | 823.15 | 824.88 | 858.12 | |
| Labour | Jim Clocherty (incumbent) | 10.41 | 538 | 705.99 | 761.29 | 776.23 | 883.69 | 923.98 |
| Independent | Eddie McEleny | 7.33 | 379 | 388.39 | 451.92 | 475.11 | | |
| Liberal Democrats | Alasdair Higgins | 6.02 | 311 | 319.81 | | | | |
Electorate: TBC Valid: 5,169 Spoilt: 139 Quota: 1,034 Turnout: 5,308 (51%)

=== Inverclyde West ===
- 2012: 1xIndependent; 1xLab; 1xSNP
- 2017: 2xIndependent; 1xSNP
- 2012-2017: Independent gain from Labour

Inverclyde West - 3 seats
| Party | Candidate | FPv% | Count | | | | | | |
| Party | Candidate | FPv% | 1 | 2 | 3 | 4 | 5 | 6 | 7 |
|---|---|---|---|---|---|---|---|---|---|
| Independent | Ronald Ahlfeld (incumbent) | 45.13 | 2,189 | | | | | | |
| SNP | Christopher McEleny (incumbent) | 23.98 | 1,163 | 1,272.68 | | | | | |
| Labour | Alan Holliday | 12.04 | 584 | 687.44 | 698.97 | 702.88 | 778.38 | 926.2 | |
| Conservative | James Kelly | 10.52 | 510 | 600.06 | 601.2 | 613.92 | 663.44 | | |
| Independent | Lynne Quinn | 4.1 | 199 | 690.34 | 711.52 | 714.47 | 782.73 | 975.4 | 1,301.8 |
| Liberal Democrats | George White | 3.81 | 185 | 271.05 | 277.16 | 280.73 | | | |
| UKIP | Alan Taylor | 0.41 | 20 | 28.47 | 29.4 | | | | |
Electorate: TBC Valid: 4,850 Spoilt: 77 Quota: 1,213 Turnout: 4,927 (57.1%)

=== Inverclyde South West ===
- 2012: 1xLab; 1xSNP; 1xLib Dem
- 2017: 1xSNP; 1xLab; 1xLib Dem
- 2012-2017: No change

Inverclyde South West - 3 seats
| Party | Candidate | FPv% | Count | | | | | | |
| Party | Candidate | FPv% | 1 | 2 | 3 | 4 | 5 | 6 | 7 |
|---|---|---|---|---|---|---|---|---|---|
| SNP | Innes Nelson (incumbent) | 25.85 | 1,059 | | | | | | |
| Labour | Gerry Dorrian (incumbent) | 19.14 | 784 | 785.12 | 809.16 | 858.35 | 961.03 | 963.12 | 1,217.06 |
| Liberal Democrats | Ciano Rebecchi (incumbent) | 19.0 | 778 | 779.64 | 804.7 | 897.89 | 1,030.18 | | |
| Conservative | Dominic Jack | 15.5 | 635 | 635.32 | 647.32 | 695.39 | 703.77 | 704.75 | |
| SNP | Alan Nicholson | 9.13 | 374 | 401.54 | 438.77 | 504.31 | | | |
| Independent | Gary Purdon | 6.96 | 285 | 286.09 | 344.12 | | | | |
| Independent | J.B. Houston | 4.42 | 181 | 181.42 | | | | | |
Electorate: TBC Valid: 4,096 Spoilt: 76 Quota: 1,025 Turnout: 4,172 (45.5%)

=== Inverclyde South ===
- 2012: 2xLab; 1xSNP
- 2017: 1xSNP; 1xLab; 1xIndependent
- 2012-2017: Independent gain from Labour

Inverclyde South - 3 seats
| Party | Candidate | FPv% | Count | | | | | | | |
| Party | Candidate | FPv% | 1 | 2 | 3 | 4 | 5 | 6 | 7 | 8 |
|---|---|---|---|---|---|---|---|---|---|---|
| SNP | John Crowther | 28.93 | 978 | | | | | | | |
| Labour | Natasha Murphy | 28.58 | 966 | | | | | | | |
| Independent | Tommy McVey | 15.74 | 532 | 538.07 | 566.77 | 592.83 | 657.11 | 703.23 | 817.23 | 993.64 |
| SNP | Agnes McAuley | 9.38 | 317 | 426.59 | 438.26 | 454.79 | 472.9 | 482.35 | 490.97 | |
| Conservative | Maureen McNeil | 8.49 | 287 | 287.54 | 298.72 | 303.97 | 314.23 | 352.95 | | |
| Liberal Democrats | Anne Duffy | 3.7 | 125 | 127.29 | 142.08 | 146.57 | 155.22 | | | |
| Independent | John Cooke | 3.14 | 106 | 110.05 | 115.76 | 124.52 | | | | |
| Independent | Vaughan Jones (incumbent) | 2.04 | 69 | 70.75 | 74.48 | | | | | |
Electorate: TBC Valid: 3,380 Spoilt: 74 Quota: 846 Turnout: 3,454 (43.8%)

== Aftermath ==
Innes Nelson resigned from the SNP on 25 October 2017 following an assault allegation. The charges were dropped on 31 October 2018 and he re-joined the party.

Former SNP group leader Chris McEleny defected to the Alba Party on the announcement by Alex Salmond of its formation on 26 March 2021. His father Jim McEleny later defected to Alba as well.
