= 2007 Inverclyde Council election =

2007 Scottish local government election

- 3 May 2007

All 20 seats to Inverclyde Council 11 seats needed for a majority
	First party	Second party	Third party
Party	Labour	SNP	Liberal Democrats
Last election	6 seats, 31.3%	0 seats, 14.8%	13 seats, 42.6%
Seats won	9	5	4
Seat change	▲3	▲5	▼9
Popular vote	12,194	6,907	6,525
Percentage	37.9%	21.5%	20.3%
Swing	▲6.6%	▲6.7%	▼22.3%
	Fourth party	Fifth party
Party	Independent	Conservative
Last election	1 seats, 3.5%	0 seats, 6.1%
Seats won	1	1
Seat change	Steady	▲1
Popular vote	3,451	2,778
Percentage	10.7%	8.6%
Swing	▲7.2%	▲2.5%

Elections to Inverclyde Council were held on 3 May 2007 the same day as the Scottish Parliament general election. The election was the first one using six new wards created as a result of the Local Governance (Scotland) Act 2004; each ward will elect three or four councillors using the single transferable vote system, a form of proportional representation. The new wards replace 20 single-member wards which used the plurality (first past the post) system of election.

== Results ==
2007 Inverclyde Council election result
Party	Seats	Gains	Losses	Net gain/loss	Seats %	Votes %	Votes	+/−
Labour	9	-	-	▲3	45.0	37.9	12,194	▲6.6
SNP	5	-	-	▲5	25.0	21.5	6,907	▲6.7
Liberal Democrats	4	-	-	▼9	20.0	20.3	6,525	▼22.3
Independent	1	-	-	Steady	5.0	10.7	3,451	▲7.2
Conservative	1	-	-	▲1	5.0	8.6	2,778	▲2.5
Solidarity	0	-	-	Steady	0.0	0.6	197	New
Scottish Socialist	0	-	-	Steady	0.0	0.3	96	▼1.4
UKIP	0	-	-	Steady	0.0	0.2	43	New

== Ward results ==
Inverclyde East
Party	Candidate	FPv%	%	Seat	Count
Labour	Stephen McCabe	2,122	30.1	1	1
SNP	Jim MacLeod	1,401	19.8	2	2
Conservative	David Wilson	1,369	19.4	3	5
Liberal Democrats	Tom Fyfe	805	11.4	4	7
Labour	Tom Monteith	522	7.4		
Liberal Democrats	Iain Tucker	404	5.7		
Independent	John Logan	259	3.7		
Solidarity	Denise McLaughlan	179	2.5		

Inverclyde East Central
Party	Candidate	FPv%	%	Seat	Count
Labour	Michael McCormick	2,065	43.5	1	1
SNP	Jim Grieve	1,132	23.8	2	2
Labour	Robert Moran	551	11.6	3	2
Liberal Democrats	Jean Stewart	425	9.0		
Conservative	Graeme Brooks	234	4.9		
Independent	Robert Kyle	188	4.0		
Independent	Tommy Murray	95	2.0		
Solidarity	Don Shearer	57	1.2		

Inverclyde North
Party	Candidate	FPv%	%	Seat	Count
Labour	Jim Clocherty	1,812	27.0	1	1
SNP	Chris Osborne	1,388	20.7	2	1
Liberal Democrats	Alan Blair	1,150	17.1	3	6
Labour	Charles McCallum†	571	8.5	4	8
Independent	Frank McGlinn	468	7.0		
Liberal Democrats	Campbell Snoddy	439	6.5		
Conservative	Margaret Miller	431	6.4		
Liberal Democrats	Robbie Henderson	342	5.1		
Independent	Kit Shields	114	1.7		

Inverclyde South
Party	Candidate	FPv%	%	Seat	Count
Labour	Iain McKenzie	1,102	26.2	1	1
Labour	Joseph McIlwee	1,000	23.8	2	3
SNP	Keith Brooks	994	23.7	3	5
Liberal Democrats	Eddie Gallacher	407	9.7		
Independent	Stuart Cameron	273	6.5		
Conservative	Jim Strachan	174	4.1		
Liberal Democrats	Robert Burns	155	3.7		
Scottish Socialist	Davy Landels	96	2.3		

Inverclyde West
Party	Candidate	FPv%	%	Seat	Count
Independent	Ronald Ahlfeld	1,256	23.7	1	2
Labour	Terry Loughran	1,212	22.9	3	4
SNP	John Crowther	1,028	19.4		
Liberal Democrats	George White†	828	15.6	2	4
Liberal Democrats	Kenny Wilson	577	10.9		
Conservative	Robert Hunter	391	7.4		

Inverclyde South West
Party	Candidate	FPv%	%	Seat	Count
SNP	Ken Ferguson	964	23.2	2	5
Independent	Innes Nelson	741	17.8		
Labour	Gerry Dorrian	723	17.4	1	5
Liberal Democrats	Ciano Rebecchi	544	13.1	3	6
Labour	Alex McGhee	514	12.4		
Liberal Democrats	Eric Forbes	449	10.8		
Conservative	Harry Osborn	179	4.3		
UKIP	Peter Campbell	43	1.0		

== Aftermath ==
On 27 November 2008 Inverclyde North Cllr Charles McCallum resigned from the Labour Party and sat as an independent for the remainder of the term.

In February 2011, Argyll News reported that Inverclyde West Councillor George White was a former Liberal Democrat who had recently joined the Liberal Party.

A by-election was held following the death of Cllr Ken Ferguson of the Scottish National Party on 26 April 2009. The seat was held by the SNP's Innes Nelson on 18 June 2009.

Inverclyde South West by-election (June 18, 2009) - 1 seat
Party	Candidate	FPv%	Count					
Party	Candidate	FPv%	1	2	3	4	5	6
SNP	Innes Nelson	42.4	919	923	932	949	988	1,087
Labour	Alex McGhee	22.6	490	492	494	507	519	
Liberal Democrats	Eric Forbes	21.0	454	455	466	478	522	620
Conservative	Iain MacLeod	7.9	171	171	178	182		
Independent	Paul Travers	3.1	67	72	77			
UKIP	Laurel Bush	2.3	49	50				
Free Scotland Party	Iain Ramsay	0.8	17					
SNP hold		Swing						
Electorate: 8,296 Valid: 2,167 Spoilt: 29 Quota: 1,084 Turnout: 2,196 (26.47%)
