= 1995 Inverclyde Council election =

1995 Scottish local government election

- 6 April 1995

All 20 seats to Inverclyde Council 11 seats needed for a majority
- Turnout: 46.4%
| | First party | Second party | Third party |
|---|---|---|---|
| Party | Labour | Liberal Democrats | Conservative |
| Last election | 11 seats, 37.6% | 8 seats, 36.3% | 1 seat, 9.5% |
| Seats won | 14 | 5 | 1 |
| Seat change | ▲3 | ▼3 | Steady |
| Popular vote | 15,904 | 9,498 | 1,203 |
| Percentage | 49.6% | 29.6% | 3.7% |
| Swing | ▲12.0% | ▼6.7% | ▼5.8% |
- Results by ward.

Elections to Inverclyde Council were held on 6 April 1995, the same day as other local elections in Scotland. This was the first election to Inverclyde since the creation of the Scottish Unitary Authorities under the Local Government etc. (Scotland) Act 1994.

== Results ==
1995 Inverclyde Council election result
| Party | Seats | Gains | Losses | Net gain/loss | Seats % | Votes % | Votes | +/− |
|---|---|---|---|---|---|---|---|---|
| Labour | 14 | - | - | ▲3 | 70.0 | 49.6 | 15,904 | ▲12.0 |
| Liberal Democrats | 5 | - | - | ▼3 | 25.0 | 29.6 | 9,498 | ▼6.7 |
| Conservative | 1 | - | - | Steady | 5.0 | 3.7 | 1,203 | ▼5.8 |
| SNP | 0 | - | - | Steady | 0.0 | 16.2 | 5,192 | ▼0.6 |
| Independent | 0 | - | - | Steady | 0.0 | 0.6 | 201 | New |
| Scottish Militant Labour | 0 | - | - | Steady | 0.0 | 0.3 | 96 | New |

== Ward Results ==
Ward 1
| Party | Candidate | Votes | % |
|---|---|---|---|
| Conservative | A Calvert | 1,034 | 50.8 |
| Labour | I Robertson | 399 | 19.6 |
| Liberal Democrats | R R Scott | 385 | 18.9 |
| SNP | D MacLean | 217 | 10.7 |
| Majority | | 635 | 31.2 |
| Turnout | | 2,035 | 46.7 |
| Conservative win (new seat) | | | |

Ward 2
| Party | Candidate | Votes | % |
|---|---|---|---|
| Labour | A Robertson | 1,238 | 78.5 |
| SNP | S McMillan | 340 | 21.5 |
| Majority | | 898 | 57.0 |
| Turnout | | 1,578 | 42.2 |
| Labour win (new seat) | | | |

Ward 3
| Party | Candidate | Votes | % |
|---|---|---|---|
| Labour | D Morrison | 1,108 | 64.6 |
| SNP | D Devenish | 430 | 25.1 |
| Liberal Democrats | J Loughlin | 178 | 10.4 |
| Majority | | 678 | 39.5 |
| Turnout | | 1,716 | 46.7 |
| Labour win (new seat) | | | |

Ward 4
| Party | Candidate | Votes | % |
|---|---|---|---|
| Labour | J J Clocherty | 848 | 46.9 |
| Liberal Democrats | J Moody | 746 | 41.3 |
| SNP | J MacLeod | 213 | 11.8 |
| Majority | | 102 | 5.6 |
| Turnout | | 1,807 | 51.5 |
| Labour win (new seat) | | | |

Ward 5
| Party | Candidate | Votes | % |
|---|---|---|---|
| Labour | M Morrison | 1,123 | 61.9 |
| Liberal Democrats | R Hawthorn | 499 | 27.5 |
| SNP | C Cannon | 191 | 10.5 |
| Majority | | 624 | 34.4 |
| Turnout | | 1,813 | 50.0 |
| Labour win (new seat) | | | |

Ward 6
| Party | Candidate | Votes | % |
|---|---|---|---|
| Labour | C Allan | 875 | 63.8 |
| SNP | P Barr | 295 | 21.5 |
| Independent | C McCallum | 201 | 14.7 |
| Majority | | 580 | 42.3 |
| Turnout | | 1,371 | 42.2 |
| Labour win (new seat) | | | |

Ward 7
| Party | Candidate | Votes | % |
|---|---|---|---|
| Labour | J O'Rourke | 1,137 | 71.5 |
| SNP | J Riddell | 229 | 14.4 |
| Liberal Democrats | T Murray | 224 | 14.1 |
| Majority | | 908 | 57.1 |
| Turnout | | 1,590 | 47.3 |
| Labour win (new seat) | | | |

Ward 8
| Party | Candidate | Votes | % |
|---|---|---|---|
| Labour | R Jackson | 657 | 70.0 |
| SNP | F McFadyen | 148 | 15.8 |
| Liberal Democrats | J McDonald | 133 | 14.2 |
| Majority | | 509 | 54.2 |
| Turnout | | 938 | 44.2 |
| Labour win (new seat) | | | |

Ward 9
| Party | Candidate | Votes | % |
|---|---|---|---|
| Labour | D M Roach | 1,342 | 62.2 |
| Liberal Democrats | W Denny | 529 | 24.5 |
| SNP | G May | 286 | 13.3 |
| Majority | | 813 | 37.7 |
| Turnout | | 2,157 | 49.4 |
| Labour win (new seat) | | | |

Ward 10
| Party | Candidate | Votes | % |
|---|---|---|---|
| Labour | A McGhee | 614 | 46.7 |
| Liberal Democrats | B Blacklaw | 489 | 37.2 |
| SNP | B K Brooks | 211 | 16.1 |
| Majority | | 125 | 9.5 |
| Turnout | | 1,314 | 41.5 |
| Labour win (new seat) | | | |

Ward 11
| Party | Candidate | Votes | % |
|---|---|---|---|
| Labour | F Cook | 832 | 47.4 |
| Liberal Democrats | A Nimmo | 703 | 40.0 |
| SNP | S Hilton | 221 | 12.6 |
| Majority | | 129 | 7.4 |
| Turnout | | 1,756 | 51.8 |
| Labour win (new seat) | | | |

Ward 12
| Party | Candidate | Votes | % |
|---|---|---|---|
| Labour | Y Robertson | 733 | 54.2 |
| Liberal Democrats | H K Scholte | 371 | 27.4 |
| SNP | J Watson | 249 | 18.4 |
| Majority | | 362 | 26.8 |
| Turnout | | 1,353 | 41.4 |
| Labour win (new seat) | | | |

Ward 13
| Party | Candidate | Votes | % |
|---|---|---|---|
| Labour | H Mulholland | 1,051 | 70.9 |
| SNP | J McConnell | 266 | 17.9 |
| Liberal Democrats | S Beith | 166 | 11.2 |
| Majority | | 785 | 23.0 |
| Turnout | | 1,483 | 43.2 |
| Labour win (new seat) | | | |

Ward 14
| Party | Candidate | Votes | % |
|---|---|---|---|
| Labour | S Stevenson | 854 | 64.6 |
| SNP | P Gillan | 259 | 19.6 |
| Liberal Democrats | W Wilson | 114 | 8.6 |
| Scottish Militant Labour | D Landels | 96 | 7.3 |
| Majority | | 595 | 45.0 |
| Turnout | | 1,323 | 37.7 |
| Labour win (new seat) | | | |

Ward 15
| Party | Candidate | Votes | % |
|---|---|---|---|
| Liberal Democrats | L Rebecchi | 639 | 44.5 |
| Labour | R Moran | 580 | 40.4 |
| SNP | C McGregor | 218 | 15.2 |
| Majority | | 59 | 4.1 |
| Turnout | | 1,437 | 43.2 |
| Liberal Democrats win (new seat) | | | |

Ward 16
| Party | Candidate | Votes | % |
|---|---|---|---|
| Liberal Democrats | J Mitchell | 1,068 | 59.4 |
| Labour | J Sutherland | 459 | 25.5 |
| SNP | J Dick | 272 | 15.1 |
| Majority | | 609 | 33.9 |
| Turnout | | 1,799 | 48.8 |
| Liberal Democrats win (new seat) | | | |

Ward 17
| Party | Candidate | Votes | % |
|---|---|---|---|
| Liberal Democrats | R Finnie | 1,176 | 62.4 |
| Labour | L Middleton | 447 | 23.7 |
| SNP | A Drovandi | 261 | 13.9 |
| Majority | | 729 | 38.7 |
| Turnout | | 1,884 | 52.4 |
| Liberal Democrats win (new seat) | | | |

Ward 18
| Party | Candidate | Votes | % |
|---|---|---|---|
| Labour | G Welch | 738 | 43.6 |
| Liberal Democrats | R C Bannister | 588 | 34.7 |
| SNP | J Crowther | 367 | 21.7 |
| Majority | | 150 | 8.9 |
| Turnout | | 1,693 | 50.6 |
| Labour win (new seat) | | | |

Ward 19
| Party | Candidate | Votes | % |
|---|---|---|---|
| Liberal Democrats | J Hunter | 776 | 55.1 |
| Labour | W Boyle | 406 | 28.8 |
| SNP | D McConnell | 227 | 16.1 |
| Majority | | 370 | 26.3 |
| Turnout | | 1,693 | 50.6 |
| Liberal Democrats win (new seat) | | | |

Ward 20
| Party | Candidate | Votes | % |
|---|---|---|---|
| Liberal Democrats | R K Campbell | 714 | 43.6 |
| Labour | I McKenzie | 463 | 28.3 |
| SNP | I Ramsay | 292 | 17.8 |
| Conservative | T McClymont | 169 | 10.3 |
| Majority | | 251 | 15.3 |
| Turnout | | 1,638 | 46.7 |
| Liberal Democrats win (new seat) | | | |
