= Martin McCluskey =

Scottish politician

Martin McCluskey MP
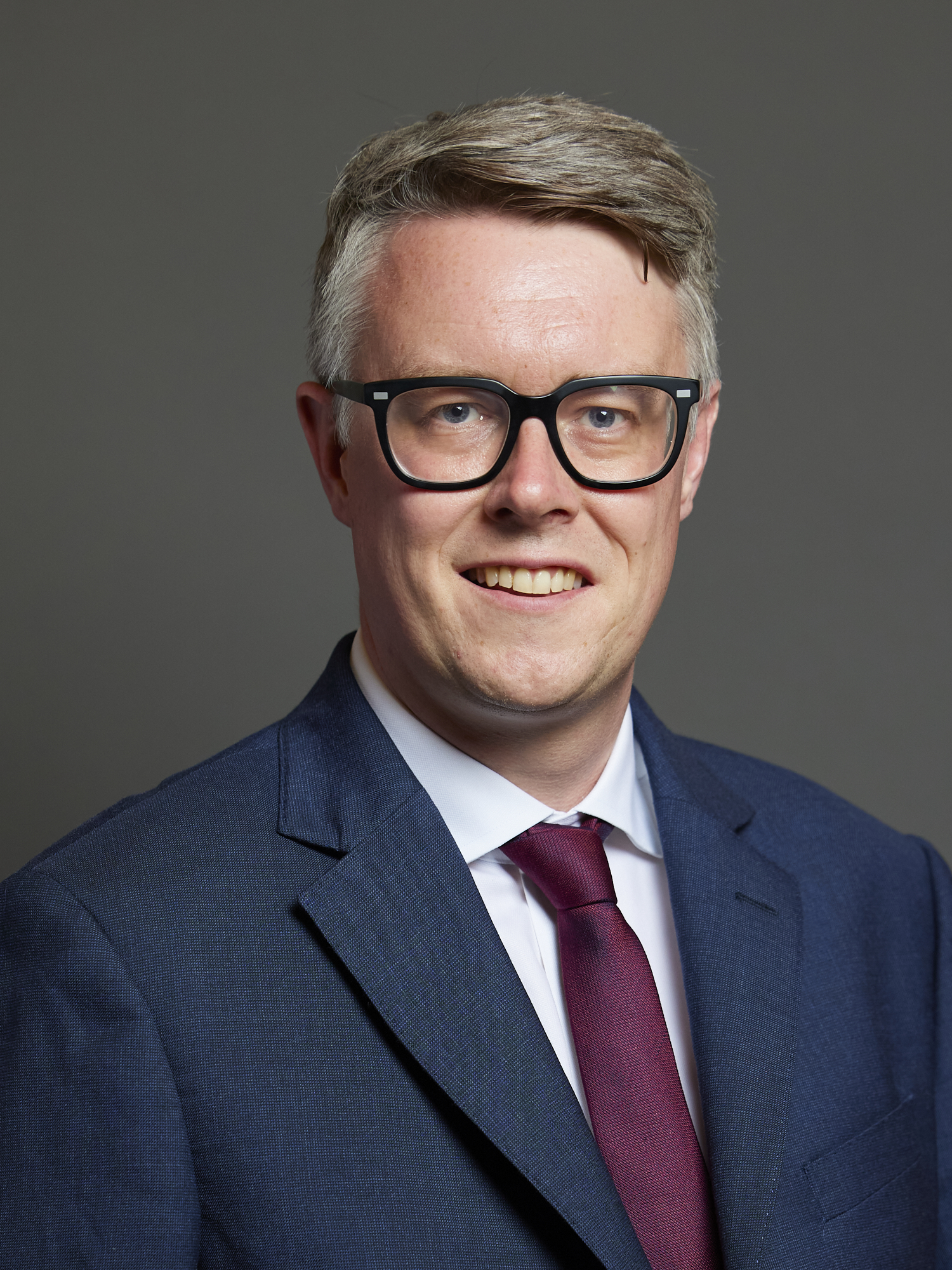
- Official portrait, 2024

Parliamentary Under-Secretary of State for Local Energy and Jobs
- Incumbent
- Assumed office 21 July 2026
- Prime Minister: Andy Burnham
- Preceded by: Position established

Parliamentary Under-Secretary of State for Energy Consumers
- In office 7 September 2025 – 21 July 2026
- Prime Minister: Keir Starmer
- Preceded by: Miatta Fahnbulleh
- Succeeded by: Polly Billington

Assistant Government Whip
- In office 18 July 2024 – 7 September 2025
- Prime Minister: Keir Starmer

Member of Parliament for Inverclyde and Renfrewshire West
- Incumbent
- Assumed office 4 July 2024
- Preceded by: Constituency Established
- Majority: 6,371 (15.8%)

Personal details
- Born: Martin James McCluskey; 25 February 1986 (age 40) Greenock, Scotland
- Party: Labour
- Education: St Patrick's Primary, Greenock; St Aloysius' College, Glasgow
- Alma mater: University of Oxford

Martin James McCluskey (born 25 February 1986) is a Scottish Labour Party politician serving as the Member of Parliament for Inverclyde and Renfrewshire West since the 2024 general election. He was promoted to Assistant Whip on 18 July 2024. On 7 September 2025 McCluskey was promoted again to be Parliamentary Under-Secretary of State for Energy Consumers in the Department for Energy Security and Net Zero.

== Background ==
McCluskey was born and brought up in Greenock and was educated at St Patrick's Primary, Greenock, St Aloysius' College, Glasgow and the University of Oxford.

From 2008 to 2010 he was an adviser to the Chair and Chief Executive of the Equality and Human Rights Commission, working on the team that delivered the Equality Act 2010, and from 2010 to 2012 worked for development charity VSO UK.

McCluskey returned to Scottish politics in 2012, working as the Shadow Cabinet’s Scotland adviser from 2012 to 2015, as an adviser to Ian Murray MP from 2015 to 2016 and then as Political Director of the Scottish Labour Party from 2016 to 2017. In 2017, he set up his own market research business, Kempock & Co.

He was elected as a councillor for Inverclyde Council (Inverclyde West ward) in 2022. Following his election as a Member of Parliament, he has resigned from his seat on Inverclyde Council.

In July 2026, McCluskey attended the International Energy Agency global conference on energy efficiency in Canada as Head of the UK delegation.

== Personal life ==
McCluskey lives in Gourock with his husband. He became Inverclyde Council's first councillor who came out as gay. The couple were married on 9 November 2024.
