= 1999 Inverclyde Council election =

1999 Scottish local government election

- 6 May 1999

All 20 seats to Inverclyde Council 11 seats needed for a majority
- Turnout: 58.6%
	First party	Second party	Third party
Party	Labour	Liberal Democrats	Conservative
Last election	14 seats, 49.6%	5 seats, 29.6%	1 seat, 3.7%
Seats won	11	8	1
Seat change	▼3	▲3	Steady
Popular vote	15,134	13,353	2,010
Percentage	38.5%	34.0%	5.1%
Swing	▼11.1%	▲4.4%	▲1.4%
- Results by ward

Elections to Inverclyde Council were held on 6 May 1999, the same day as other Scottish Local Government elections and the first Scottish Parliament Election.

== Results ==
1999 Inverclyde Council election result
Party	Seats	Gains	Losses	Net gain/loss	Seats %	Votes %	Votes	+/−
Labour	11	0	3	▼3	55.0	38.5	15,134	▼11.1
Liberal Democrats	8	3	0	▲3	40.0	34.0	13,353	▲4.4
Conservative	1	0	0	Steady	5.0	5.1	2,010	▲1.4
SNP	0	0	0	Steady	0.0	21.7	8,512	▲5.5
MFNS	0	0	0	Steady	0.0	0.6	232	New
Independent	0	0	0	Steady	0.0	0.1	42	▼0.5

== Ward results ==
Ward 1
Party	Candidate	Votes	%	±%
Conservative	A Calvert	1,420	50.4	−0.4
Labour	M Munro	608	21.6	+2.0
SNP	S Thomson	395	14.0	+3.3
Liberal Democrats	S M Kelly	393	14.0	−5.9
Majority		812	28.8	−2.4
Turnout		2816	65.3	+18.6
Conservative hold		Swing		

Ward 2
Party	Candidate	Votes	%	±%
Labour	A Robertson	980	55.8	−22.7
SNP	J MacLeod	583	33.2	+11.7
Liberal Democrats	R Hawthorne	193	11.0	+11.0
Majority		397	22.6	−34.4
Turnout		1,756	52.6	+10.4
Labour hold		Swing		

Ward 3
Party	Candidate	Votes	%	±%
Labour	D Morrison	1,128	56.0	−11.4
SNP	R McKibben	586	29.1	+4.0
Liberal Democrats	P A Cameron	301	14.9	+4.5
Majority		542	26.9	+12.6
Turnout		2,015		
Labour hold		Swing		

Ward 4
Party	Candidate	Votes	%	±%
Liberal Democrats	J Moody	1,197	59.3	+18.0
Labour	J Clocherty	541	26.8	−20.1
SNP	F Stobie	234	11.6	−0.2
Conservative	J W Hunter	48	2.4	+2.4
Majority		656	32.5	
Turnout		2,020	60.8	+9.3
Liberal Democrats gain from Labour		Swing		

Ward 5
Party	Candidate	Votes	%	±%
Labour	M Morrison	1,004	47.2	−14.7
Liberal Democrats	R M Hill	532	25.0	−2.5
SNP	J Grieve	479	22.5	+12.0
Conservative	A H Johnstone	111	5.2	+5.2
Majority		472	22.2	−12.2
Turnout		2,126	61.2	+11.2
Labour hold		Swing		

Ward 6
Party	Candidate	Votes	%	±%
Labour	S McCabe	885	56.3	−7.5
SNP	C Masterson	415	26.4	+4.9
Liberal Democrats	S Wilson	272	17.3	+17.3
Majority		470	29.9	−12.4
Turnout		1,572	53.5	+6.2
Labour hold		Swing		

Ward 7
Party	Candidate	Votes	%	±%
Labour	J O'Rourke	1,048	62.0	−9.5
SNP	J L Riddell	417	24.7	+10.3
Liberal Democrats	H Scholte	225	13.3	−0.8
Majority		631	37.3	−19.8
Turnout		1,690	53.5	+6.2
Labour hold		Swing		

Ward 8
Party	Candidate	Votes	%	±%
Labour	R Jackson	729	50.1	−19.9
SNP	S McMillan	368	25.3	+9.5
Liberal Democrats	W Denny	357	24.6	+10.4
Majority		361	24.8	−29.4
Turnout		1,454	49.3	+5.1
Labour hold		Swing		

Ward 9
Party	Candidate	Votes	%	±%
Labour	David Roach	972	56.2	−6.0
SNP	S Hilton	336	19.4	+6.1
Liberal Democrats	E Loughran	318	18.4	−6.1
MFNS	C Kavanagh	104	6.0	+6.0
Majority		636	36.8	−0.9
Turnout		1,730	58.0	+11.4
Labour hold		Swing		

Ward 10
Party	Candidate	Votes	%	±%
Labour	A McGhee	648	35.2	−11.5
Liberal Democrats	E S Forbes	587	31.9	−5.3
SNP	J Dick	382	20.7	+4.6
MFNS	C M Kavanagh	128	6.9	+6.9
Conservative	T McEleny	97	5.3	+5.3
Majority		61	3.3	+6.2
Turnout		1,842	55.3	+13.8
Labour hold		Swing		

Ward 11
Party	Candidate	Votes	%	±%
Liberal Democrats	A Nimmo	1,070	50.1	+10.1
Labour	J McIlwee	689	32.3	−15.1
SNP	J McConnell	377	17.6	+5.0
Majority		381	17.8	
Turnout		2,136	61.0	+9.2
Liberal Democrats gain from Labour		Swing		

Ward 12
Party	Candidate	Votes	%	±%
Labour	Y Robertson	705	43.4	−10.8
Liberal Democrats	E Gallagher	525	32.3	+4.9
SNP	C Park	393	24.2	+5.8
Majority		180	11.1	−15.7
Turnout		1,623	50.6	+9.2
Labour hold		Swing		

Ward 13
Party	Candidate	Votes	%	±%
Labour	H Mulholland	943	55.0	−15.9
SNP	D McConnell	436	25.5	+7.6
Liberal Democrats	D Belshaw	334	19.5	+8.3
Majority		507	29.5	−23.5
Turnout		1,713	54.5	+11.3
Labour hold		Swing		

Ward 14
Party	Candidate	Votes	%	±%
Labour	P McCormick	758	47.0	−17.6
SNP	P Gillan	529	32.8	+13.2
Liberal Democrats	E Sassarini	285	17.7	+9.1
Independent	P Campbell	42	2.6	+2.6
Majority		229	14.2	−30.8
Turnout		1,614	48.3	+10.6
Labour hold		Swing		

Ward 15
Party	Candidate	Votes	%	±%
Liberal Democrats	Luciano Rebecchi	859	48.4	+3.9
Labour	R Moran	589	33.2	−7.2
SNP	F McFadyen	327	18.4	+3.2
Majority		270	15.2	+11.1
Turnout		1,775	53.2	+10.0
Liberal Democrats hold		Swing		

Ward 16
Party	Candidate	Votes	%	±%
Liberal Democrats	James Mitchell	1,411	59.6	+0.2
Labour	J McLaughlin	580	24.5	−1.0
SNP	B K Brooks	375	15.8	+0.7
Majority		831	35.1	+1.2
Turnout		2,366	66.3	+17.5
Liberal Democrats hold		Swing		

Ward 17
Party	Candidate	Votes	%	±%
Liberal Democrats	A J Blair	1,555	61.7	−0.7
Labour	I McKenzie	518	20.6	−3.1
SNP	G Gordon	446	17.7	+3.8
Majority		1,037	41.1	+2.1
Turnout		2,519	69.1	+16.7
Liberal Democrats hold		Swing		

Ward 18
Party	Candidate	Votes	%	±%
Liberal Democrats	G White	998	43.8	+0.2
Labour	G Welch	726	31.8	−2.9
SNP	J Crowther	557	24.4	+2.7
Majority		272	12.0	+3.1
Turnout		2,281	65.1	+14.5
Liberal Democrats hold		Swing		

Ward 19
Party	Candidate	Votes	%	±%
Liberal Democrats	J Hunter	1,055	45.5	−9.6
Labour	T Loughran	509	22.0	−6.8
SNP	D McBride	420	18.1	+2.0
Conservative	W Strachan	334	14.4	+14.4
Majority		546	23.5	−2.8
Turnout		2,318	64.8	+16.6
Liberal Democrats hold		Swing		

Ward 20
Party	Candidate	Votes	%	±%
Liberal Democrats	R K Campbell	886	46.2	+2.6
Labour	J Sutherland	574	29.9	+1.6
SNP	I Ramsay	457	23.8	+6.0
Majority		312	16.3	+1.0
Turnout		1,917	62.7	16.0
Liberal Democrats hold		Swing		
