= Inverclyde West (ward) =

Ward of Inverclyde Council, Scotland

Location of the ward

Inverclyde West is one of the seven wards used to elect members of the Inverclyde Council. It elects three Councillors.

The ward consists entirely of the town of Gourock on the Firth of Clyde. In 2019, the ward had a population of 10,411.

== Councillors ==
Election	Councillors		
2007	Ronald Ahlfeld (Ind.)	Terry Loughran (Labour)	George White (Liberal Democrats)
2012	Ronald Ahlfeld (Ind.)	Terry Loughran (Labour)	Christopher McEleny (SNP/ Alba)
2017	Ronald Ahlfeld (Ind.)	Lynne Quinn (Ind.)	Christopher McEleny (SNP/ Alba)
2021	Ronald Ahlfeld (Ind.)	Lynne Quinn (Ind.)	Christopher McEleny (SNP/ Alba)
2022	Martin McCluskey (Labour)	Lynne Quinn (Ind.)	Sandra Reynolds (SNP)
2024 by-	Ian Hellyer (Labour)	Lynne Quinn (Ind.)	Sandra Reynolds (SNP)

== Election results ==
=== 2024 by-election ===
Inverclyde West by-election (7 November 2024) - 1 seat
Party	Candidate	FPv%	Count				
Party	Candidate	FPv%	1	2	3	4	5
Labour	Ian Hellyer	34.0	932	961	999	1,165	1,568
SNP	Robert Kirkpatrick	33.7	923	939	1,050	1,082	
Conservative	Ted Runciman	15.2	415	485	515		
Alba	Christopher McEleny	8.7	239	258			
Reform	John Burleigh	8.4	230				
Electorate: 8,775 Valid: 2,739 Spoilt: 19 Quota: 1,370 Turnout: 31.4%

=== 2022 Election ===
2022 Inverclyde Council election

Inverclyde West - 3 seats
Party	Candidate	FPv%	Count
Party	Candidate	FPv%	1
Independent	Lynne Quinn (incumbent)		1,440
SNP	Sandra Reynolds		1,271
Labour	Martin McCluskey		1,247
Conservative	Ted Runciman		453
Alba	Christopher McEleny (incumbent)		126
Liberal Democrats	John Burleigh		171
Independent	William Wilson		66
Electorate: TBC Valid: 4,774 Quota: 1,194 Turnout: 4,804

=== 2017 Election ===
2017 Inverclyde Council election

Inverclyde West - 3 seats
Party	Candidate	FPv%	Count						
Party	Candidate	FPv%	1	2	3	4	5	6	7
Independent	Ronald Ahlfeld (incumbent)	45.13	2,189						
SNP	Christopher McEleny (incumbent)	23.98	1,163	1,272.68					
Labour	Alan Holliday	12.04	584	687.44	698.97	702.88	778.38	926.2	
Conservative	James Kelly	10.52	510	600.06	601.2	613.92	663.44		
Independent	Lynne Quinn	4.1	199	690.34	711.52	714.47	782.73	975.4	1,301.8
Liberal Democrats	George White	3.81	185	271.05	277.16	280.73			
UKIP	Alan Taylor	0.41	20	28.47	29.4				
Electorate: TBC Valid: 4,850 Spoilt: 77 Quota: 1,213 Turnout: 4,927 (57.1%)

=== 2012 Election ===
2012 Inverclyde Council election

Inverclyde West - 3 seats
Party	Candidate	FPv%	Count						
Party	Candidate	FPv%	1	2	3	4	5	6	7
Independent	Ronald Ahlfeld (incumbent)	44.8	1,951						
Labour	Terry Loughran (incumbent)	22.5	991	1,157.9					
SNP	Christopher McEleny	12.2	541	649.2	657.3	682.7	982.4	1,010.3	1,129.2
SNP	Ralph Roberts	6.8	301	359	361.9	368.8			
Conservative	Iain D. MacLeod	5.7	253	331.2	333.9	383.9	394.7		
Liberal	George White (incumbent)	5.1	227	383.5	393.2	463.1	482.6	604.3	
Liberal Democrats	Gordon Anderson	3.3	146	207.7	212				
Electorate: 8,642 Valid: 4,410 Spoilt: 46 Quota: 1,103 Turnout: 4,456 (51.56%)

=== 2007 Election ===
2007 Inverclyde Council election

Inverclyde West
Party	Candidate	FPv%	%	Seat	Count
Independent	Ronald Ahlfeld	1,256	23.7	1	2
Labour	Terry Loughran	1,212	22.9	3	4
SNP	John Crowther	1,028	19.4		
Liberal Democrats	George White†	828	15.6	2	4
Liberal Democrats	Kenny Wilson	577	10.9		
Conservative	Robert Hunter	391	7.4		
