= Inverclyde South West (ward) =

Electoral ward in Inverclyde, Scotland

Location of the ward

Inverclyde South West is one of the seven wards used to elect members of the Inverclyde Council. It elects three Councillors.

The ward includes the neighbouring coastal villages of Inverkip and Wemyss Bay on the Firth of Clyde, an elevated rural hinterland to the east (part of the Clyde Muirshiel Regional Park, including Loch Thom) and the south-western suburbs of Greenock (the Braeside, Branchton and Larkfield neighbourhoods). In 2019, the ward had a population of 11,649.

== Councillors ==
Election	Councillors		
2007	Ken Ferguson (SNP)	Gerry Dorrian (Labour)	Ciano Rebecchi (Liberal Democrats)
2009 by-	Innes Nelson (SNP)	Gerry Dorrian (Labour)	Ciano Rebecchi (Liberal Democrats)
2012	Innes Nelson (SNP)	Gerry Dorrian (Labour)	Ciano Rebecchi (Liberal Democrats)
2017	Innes Nelson (SNP)	Gerry Dorrian (Labour)	Ciano Rebecchi (Liberal Democrats)
2022	Innes Nelson (SNP)	Paul Cassidy (Labour)	James Daisley (SNP)

== Election results ==
=== 2022 Election ===
2022 Inverclyde Council election

Inverclyde South West - 3 seats
Party	Candidate	FPv%	Count					
Party	Candidate	FPv%	1	2	3	4	5	6
SNP	James Daisley		1,206					
Labour	Paul Cassidy		1,175					
SNP	Innes Nelson (incumbent)		606	755.66	774.88	815.79	925.97	1,057.69
Conservative	Lisa Dallas		507	510.15	540.6	632.83	727.67	
Independent	Paul Travers		316	326.56	343.87	411.97		
Liberal Democrats	Alasdair Higgins		251	259.82	306.77			
Electorate: TBC Valid: 4,061 Spoilt: 59 Quota: 1,016 Turnout: 4,120

=== 2017 Election ===
2017 Inverclyde Council election

Inverclyde South West - 3 seats
Party	Candidate	FPv%	Count						
Party	Candidate	FPv%	1	2	3	4	5	6	7
SNP	Innes Nelson (incumbent)	25.85	1,059						
Labour	Gerry Dorrian (incumbent)	19.14	784	785.12	809.16	858.35	961.03	963.12	1,217.06
Liberal Democrats	Ciano Rebecchi (incumbent)	19.0	778	779.64	804.7	897.89	1,030.18		
Conservative	Dominic Jack	15.5	635	635.32	647.32	695.39	703.77	704.75	
SNP	Alan Nicholson	9.13	374	401.54	438.77	504.31			
Independent	Gary Purdon	6.96	285	286.09	344.12				
Independent	J.B. Houston	4.42	181	181.42					
Electorate: TBC Valid: 4,096 Spoilt: 76 Quota: 1,025 Turnout: 4,172 (45.5%)

=== 2012 Election ===
2012 Inverclyde Council election

Inverclyde South West - 3 seats
Party	Candidate	FPv%	Count					
Party	Candidate	FPv%	1	2	3	4	5	6
Labour	Gerry Dorrian (incumbent)	22.6	768	779	789	792	829.2	873.7
SNP	Innes Nelson (incumbent)	22.6	766	772	801	804.3	1,117.9	
Liberal Democrats	Ciano Rebecchi (incumbent)	22.4	759	764	865			
Labour	Colin Jackson	12.2	415	419	430	432.1	443.3	471.5
SNP	John Crowther	11.9	405	413	418	419.5		
Conservative	Duncan Simpson	6.4	217	229				
Independent	Peter Patrick Glancy Campbell	1.8	62					
Electorate: 8,666 Valid: 3,392 Spoilt: 59 Quota: 849 Turnout: 3,451 (39.82%)

=== 2007 Election ===
2007 Inverclyde Council election

Inverclyde South West
Party	Candidate	FPv%	%	Seat	Count
SNP	Ken Ferguson	964	23.2	2	5
Independent	Innes Nelson	741	17.8		
Labour	Gerry Dorrian	723	17.4	1	5
Liberal Democrats	Ciano Rebecchi	544	13.1	3	6
Labour	Alex McGhee	514	12.4		
Liberal Democrats	Eric Forbes	449	10.8		
Conservative	Harry Osborn	179	4.3		
UKIP	Peter Campbell	43	1.0		
