= Inverclyde North (ward) =

Electoral ward in Inverclyde, Scotland

Location of the ward

Inverclyde North is one of the seven wards used to elect members of the Inverclyde Council. It elects four Councillors.

The ward includes northern areas of Greenock, predominantly the town's West End and all streets between Lyle Hill and the Firth of Clyde up to the boundary with Gourock, plus part of the town centre (north of the Inverclyde Line railway tracks, west of Bank Street, north of Wellington Street). In 2019, the ward had a population of 13,759.

== Councillors ==
Election	Councillors			
2007	Chris Osborne (SNP)	Jim Clocherty (Labour)	Charles McCallum (Labour /Ind.)	Alan Blair (Liberal Democrats)
2008	Chris Osborne (SNP)	Jim Clocherty (Labour)	Charles McCallum (Labour /Ind.)	Alan Blair (Liberal Democrats)
2012	Math Campbell-Sturgess (SNP)	Jim Clocherty (Labour)	Martin Brennan (Labour)	Kenny Shepherd (Liberal Democrats)
2017	Elizabeth Robertson (SNP)	Jim Clocherty (Labour)	Martin Brennan (Labour)	Graeme Brooks (Conservative)
2022	Elizabeth Robertson (SNP)	Jim Clocherty (Labour)	Francesca Brennan (Labour)	Graeme Brooks (Conservative)

== Election results ==
=== 2022 Election ===
2022 Inverclyde Council election

Inverclyde North - 4 seats
Party	Candidate	FPv%	Count							
Party	Candidate	FPv%	1	2	3	4	5	6	7	8
Labour	Francesca Brennan	25.5	1,284							
SNP	Elizabeth Robertson (incumbent)	22.3	1,122							
Conservative	Graeme Brooks (incumbent)	15.1	761	787.77	789.08	791.4	800.40	886.52	995.77	1,018
SNP	Jenn Scott-McClafferty	12.0	606	615.64	713.63	738.14	744.36	766.40	826.21	
Labour	Jim Clocherty (incumbent)	10.4	526	716.4	719.52	728.94	733.46	799.36	862.95	1,138.36
Liberal Democrats	Jacci Stoyle	6.2	312	323.34	325.06	330.06	336.92			
Independent	Gillian Maxwell	5.7	285	295.92	298.94	309.57	347.98			
Independent	John Davidson *	1.5	75	77.1	78.51	85.82				
Alba	Philomena Donnachie	1.4	70	71.5	73.32	74.3				
Electorate: 10,353 Valid: 5,041 Spoilt: 128 Quota: 1,009 Turnout: 5,169 (49.9%)

- = Running under The Pensioner's Party

=== 2017 Election ===
2017 Inverclyde Council election

Inverclyde North - 4 seats
Party	Candidate	FPv%	Count					
Party	Candidate	FPv%	1	2	3	4	5	6
Labour	Martin Brennan (incumbent)	24.74	1,279					
Conservative	Graeme Brooks	19.27	996	1,015.92	1,111.6			
SNP	Elizabeth Robertson	16.72	864	871.28	891.47	893.59	957.12	1,687.09
SNP	Philomena Donnachie	15.52	802	812.15	823.15	824.88	858.12	
Labour	Jim Clocherty (incumbent)	10.41	538	705.99	761.29	776.23	883.69	923.98
Independent	Eddie McEleny	7.33	379	388.39	451.92	475.11		
Liberal Democrats	Alasdair Higgins	6.02	311	319.81				
Electorate: TBC Valid: 5,169 Spoilt: 139 Quota: 1,034 Turnout: 5,308 (51%)

=== 2012 Election ===
2012 Inverclyde Council election

Inverclyde North - 4 seats
Party	Candidate	FPv%	Count						
Party	Candidate	FPv%	1	2	3	4	5	6	7
Labour	Martin Brennan	33.8	1,804						
Labour	Jim Clocherty (incumbent)	16.2	863	1,419.8					
SNP	Math Campbell-Sturgess	16.0	854	889.1	928.4	954.1	1,334.3		
Liberal Democrats	Kenny Shepherd	11.8	628	651.3	684.6	755.7	794.4	853.9	1,177.8
Conservative	Graeme Brooks	9.5	508	525.9	539.4	573.1	583.6	611.2	
SNP	Alex De Ruyter	8.4	449	462.9	476.7	500.4			
Independent	Charles McCallum (incumbent)	4.1	224	237.9	288.6				
Electorate: 10,222 Valid: 5,330 Spoilt: 192 Quota: 1067 Turnout: 5,492 (45.22%)

=== 2007 Election ===
2007 Inverclyde Council election

Inverclyde North
Party	Candidate	FPv%	%	Seat	Count
Labour	Jim Clocherty	1,812	27.0	1	1
SNP	Chris Osborne	1,388	20.7	2	1
Liberal Democrats	Alan Blair	1,150	17.1	3	6
Labour	Charles McCallum†	571	8.5	4	8
Independent	Frank McGlinn	468	7.0		
Liberal Democrats	Campbell Snoddy	439	6.5		
Conservative	Margaret Miller	431	6.4		
Liberal Democrats	Robbie Henderson	342	5.1		
Independent	Kit Shields	114	1.7		
