= Inverclyde East (ward) =

Electoral ward in Inverclyde, Scotland

Location of the ward

Inverclyde East is one of the seven wards used to elect members to the Inverclyde Council. It elects three Councillors.

The ward includes the large village of Kilmacolm, the smaller settlement of Quarrier's Village, and an elevated rural area to the west that forms part of the Clyde Muirshiel Regional Park. It also covers the eastern parts of Port Glasgow, including the neighborhoods of Bardrainney, Broadfield, Park Farm and Woodhall. As of 2019, the ward had a population of 11,340.

== Councillors ==
Election	Councillors			
2007	Jim MacLeod (SNP)	David Wilson (Conservative)	Stephen McCabe (Labour)	Tom Fyfe (Liberal Democrats)
2012	Jim MacLeod (SNP)	David Wilson (Conservative)	Stephen McCabe (Labour)	James McColgan (Labour)
2017	Christopher Curley (SNP)	David Wilson (Conservative)	Stephen McCabe (Labour)	3 seats
2022	Christopher Curley (SNP)	David Wilson (Conservative)	Stephen McCabe (Labour)	3 seats

== Election results ==
=== 2022 Election ===
2022 Inverclyde Council election

Inverclyde East - 3 seats
Party	Candidate	FPv%	Count
Party	Candidate	FPv%	1
SNP	Christopher Curley (incumbent)		Unopposed
Labour	Stephen McCabe (incumbent)		Unopposed
Conservative	David Wilson (incumbent)		Unopposed

=== 2017 Election ===
2017 Inverclyde Council election

Inverclyde East - 3 seats
Party	Candidate	FPv%	Count	
Party	Candidate	FPv%	1	2
Conservative	David Wilson (incumbent)	39.98	1,767	
SNP	Christopher Curley	27.01	1,194	
Labour	Stephen McCabe (incumbent)	21.56	953	1,128.07
Independent	Jim Boyland	8.05	356	427.45
Liberal Democrats	Jacci Stoyle	3.39	150	318.71
Electorate: TBC Valid: 4,420 Spoilt: 52 Quota: 1,106 Turnout: 4,472 (52%)

=== 2012 Election ===
2012 Inverclyde Council election

Inverclyde East - 4 seats
Party	Candidate	FPv%	Count	
Party	Candidate	FPv%	1	2
Labour	Stephen McCabe (incumbent)	28.7	1,607	
Conservative	David Wilson (incumbent)	25.8	1,447	
SNP	Jim MacLeod (incumbent)	25.4	1,426	
Labour	James McColgan	14.5	812	1,233.3
Liberal Democrats	John Watson	5.6	313	332.9
Electorate: 12,770 Valid: 5,605 Spoilt: 120 Quota: 1,122 Turnout: 5,725 (44.83%)

=== 2007 Election ===
2007 Inverclyde Council election

Inverclyde East
Party	Candidate	FPv%	%	Seat	Count
Labour	Stephen McCabe	2,122	30.1	1	1
SNP	Jim MacLeod	1,401	19.8	2	2
Conservative	David Wilson	1,369	19.4	3	5
Liberal Democrats	Tom Fyfe	805	11.4	4	7
Labour	Tom Monteith	522	7.4		
Liberal Democrats	Iain Tucker	404	5.7		
Independent	John Logan	259	3.7		
Solidarity	Denise McLaughlan	179	2.5		
