= Inverclyde South (ward) =

Location of the ward

Inverclyde South is one of the seven wards used to elect members of the Inverclyde Council. It elects three Councillors.

The ward includes southern areas of Greenock: neighbourhoods such as Bow Farm, Coves, Cowdenknowes, Gateside, Penny Fern, Ravenscraig and Smithston, plus a small part of the town centre (west of Broomhill Street, roughly between Drumfrochar and Greenock West railway stations). In 2019, the ward had a population of 9,203.

== Councillors ==
Election	Councillors		
2007	Keith Brooks (SNP)	Joseph McIlwee (Labour)	Iain McKenzie (Labour)
2012	Keith Brooks (SNP)	Joseph McIlwee (Labour)	Vaughan Jones (Labour /Ind.)
2014	Keith Brooks (SNP)	Joseph McIlwee (Labour)	Vaughan Jones (Labour /Ind.)
2017	John Crowther (SNP)	Natasha Murphy (Labour)	Tommy McVey (Ind.)
2022	John Crowther (SNP)	Natasha Murphy (Labour)	Tommy McVey (Ind.)

== Election results ==
=== 2022 Election ===
2022 Inverclyde Council election

Inverclyde South - 3 seats
Party	Candidate	FPv%	Count			
Party	Candidate	FPv%	1	2	3	4
SNP	John Crowther (incumbent)		972			
Labour	Natasha McGuire (incumbent)		891			
Independent	Tommy McVey (incumbent)		730	743.12	777.91	915.99
SNP	Irene McLeod		359	506.55	521.51	528.05
Conservative	Georgina Halfnight		205	207.25	220.06	
Electorate: TBC Valid: 3,157 Spoilt: 298 Quota: 790 Turnout: 3,219

=== 2017 Election ===
2017 Inverclyde Council election

Inverclyde South - 3 seats
Party	Candidate	FPv%	Count							
Party	Candidate	FPv%	1	2	3	4	5	6	7	8
SNP	John Crowther	28.93	978							
Labour	Natasha Murphy	28.58	966							
Independent	Tommy McVey	15.74	532	538.07	566.77	592.83	657.11	703.23	817.23	993.64
SNP	Agnes McAuley	9.38	317	426.59	438.26	454.79	472.9	482.35	490.97	
Conservative	Maureen McNeil	8.49	287	287.54	298.72	303.97	314.23	352.95		
Liberal Democrats	Anne Duffy	3.7	125	127.29	142.08	146.57	155.22			
Independent	John Cooke	3.14	106	110.05	115.76	124.52				
Independent	Vaughan Jones (incumbent)	2.04	69	70.75	74.48					
Electorate: TBC Valid: 3,380 Spoilt: 74 Quota: 846 Turnout: 3,454 (43.8%)

=== 2012 Election ===
2012 Inverclyde Council election

Inverclyde South - 3 seats
Party	Candidate	FPv%	Count	
Party	Candidate	FPv%	1	2
Labour	Joe McIlwee (incumbent)	41.3	1,392	
SNP	Keith Brooks (incumbent)	29.8	1,004	
Labour	Vaughan Jones†	17.5	589	1,025.9
Independent	Don Shearer	4.7	157	187.8
Conservative	Bill Crawford	3.4	114	117.2
Liberal Democrats	Kevin Diamond	3.0	111	122.5
Electorate: 8,390 Valid: 3,367 Spoilt: 68 Quota: 842 Turnout: 3,435 (40.94%)

=== 2007 Election ===
2007 Inverclyde Council election

Inverclyde South
Party	Candidate	FPv%	%	Seat	Count
Labour	Iain McKenzie	1,102	26.2	1	1
Labour	Joseph McIlwee	1,000	23.8	2	3
SNP	Keith Brooks	994	23.7	3	5
Liberal Democrats	Eddie Gallacher	407	9.7		
Independent	Stuart Cameron	273	6.5		
Conservative	Jim Strachan	174	4.1		
Liberal Democrats	Robert Burns	155	3.7		
Scottish Socialist	Davy Landels	96	2.3		
