= 2012 Inverclyde Council election =

2012 Scottish local government election

- 3 May 2012

All 20 seats to Inverclyde Council 11 seats needed for a majority
	First party	Second party	Third party
Leader	Stephen McCabe	Keith Brooks	Ciano Rebecchi
Party	Labour	SNP	Liberal Democrats
Leader's seat	Inverclyde East	Inverclyde South	Inverclyde South West
Last election	9 seats, 45.0%	5 seats, 25.0%	4 seats, 20.3%
Seats before	8	5	3
Seats won	10	6	2
Seat change	▲1	▲1	▼2
Popular vote	11,542	6,636	2,063
Percentage	44.2%	25.4%	7.9%
Swing	▲6.3%	▲3.9%	▼12.4%
	Fourth party	Fifth party
Leader	Ronald Ahlfeld	David Wilson
Party	Independent	Conservative
Leader's seat	Inverclyde West	Inverclyde East
Last election	1 seat, 10.7%	1 seat, 5.0%
Seats before	1	1
Seats won	1	1
Seat change	Steady	Steady
Popular vote	2,986	2,635
Percentage	11.4%	10.1%
Swing	▲0.7%	▲1.2%
Council Leader before election
Stephen McCabe
Labour
Council Leader after election
Stephen McCabe
Labour

Elections to Inverclyde Council were held on 3 May 2012, the same day as the other 31 local authorities in Scotland. The election used the six wards created as a result of the Local Governance (Scotland) Act 2004, with each ward electing three or four Councillors using the single transferable vote system form of proportional representation, with 20 Councillors being elected in total.

The election saw Labour Councillors remain the largest party as they gained 1 additional seat to hold half the seats on the Council. The Scottish National Party also increased their representation by 1 seat and remained in second place on the authority. The Scottish Liberal Democrats remained in third place but lost half of their seats, falling from 4 seats to 2. The Independent and Scottish Conservative and Unionist Party retained their solitary seats on the authority.

Following the election the Labour Party again formed a minority administration this time with the support of the Independent and the Conservative Party Councillors.

== Results ==
2012 Inverclyde Council election result
Party	Seats	Gains	Losses	Net gain/loss	Seats %	Votes %	Votes	+/−
Labour	10	1	0	▲1	50.0	44.2	11,542	▲6.3
SNP	6	1	0	▲1	30.0	25.4	6,636	▲3.9
Liberal Democrats	2	0	2	▼2	10.0	7.9	2,063	▼12.4
Independent	1	0	0	Steady	5.0	11.4	2,986	▲0.7
Conservative	1	0	0	Steady	5.0	10.1	2,635	▲1.2
Liberal	0	0	0	Steady	0.0	0.9	227	New

Note: "Votes" are the first preference votes. The net gain/loss and percentage changes relate to the result of the previous Scottish local elections on 3 May 2007. This may differ from other published sources showing gain/loss relative to seats held at dissolution of Scotland's councils.

== Ward results ==
=== Inverclyde East ===
- 2007: 1xLab; 1xSNP; 1xCon; 1xLib Dem
- 2012: 2xLab; 1xCon; 1xSNP
- 2007-2012: Lab gain one seat from Lib Dem

Inverclyde East - 4 seats
Party	Candidate	FPv%	Count	
Party	Candidate	FPv%	1	2
Labour	Stephen McCabe (incumbent)	28.7	1,607	
Conservative	David Wilson (incumbent)	25.8	1,447	
SNP	Jim MacLeod (incumbent)	25.4	1,426	
Labour	James McColgan	14.5	812	1,233.3
Liberal Democrats	John Watson	5.6	313	332.9
Electorate: 12,770 Valid: 5,605 Spoilt: 120 Quota: 1,122 Turnout: 5,725 (44.83%)

=== Inverclyde East Central ===
- 2007: 2xLab; 1xSNP
- 2012: 2xLab; 1xSNP
- 2007-2012: No change

Inverclyde East Central - 3 seats
Party	Candidate	FPv%	Count				
Party	Candidate	FPv%	1	2	3	4	5
Labour	Michael McCormick (incumbent)	42.4	1,689				
SNP	Jim Grieve (incumbent)	22.3	890	925.6	945.9	953.2	1,003.8
Labour	Robert Moran (incumbent)	14.5	612	1,134.4			
Independent	Drew McKenzie	14.5	592	638.7	685.6	702.3	741.6
Liberal Democrats	Robert Burns	2.7	106	117.1	125.8	136.9	
Conservative	Harry Osborn	2.5	96	98.5	100.7		
Electorate: 10,222 Valid: 3,985 Spoilt: 117 Quota: 997 Turnout: 4,102 (40.13%)

=== Inverclyde North ===
- 2007: 2xLab; 1xSNP; 1xLib Dem
- 2012: 2xLab; 1xSNP; 1xLib Dem
- 2007-2012: No change

Inverclyde North - 4 seats
Party	Candidate	FPv%	Count						
Party	Candidate	FPv%	1	2	3	4	5	6	7
Labour	Martin Brennan	33.8	1,804						
Labour	Jim Clocherty (incumbent)	16.2	863	1,419.8					
SNP	Math Campbell-Sturgess	16.0	854	889.1	928.4	954.1	1,334.3		
Liberal Democrats	Kenny Shepherd	11.8	628	651.3	684.6	755.7	794.4	853.9	1,177.8
Conservative	Graeme Brooks	9.5	508	525.9	539.4	573.1	583.6	611.2	
SNP	Alex De Ruyter	8.4	449	462.9	476.7	500.4			
Independent	Charles McCallum (incumbent)	4.1	224	237.9	288.6				
Electorate: 10,222 Valid: 5,330 Spoilt: 192 Quota: 1,067 Turnout: 5,492 (45.22%)

=== Inverclyde South ===
- 2007: 2xLab; 1xSNP
- 2012: 2xLab; 1xSNP
- 2007-2012: No change

Inverclyde South - 3 seats
Party	Candidate	FPv%	Count	
Party	Candidate	FPv%	1	2
Labour	Joe McIlwee (incumbent)	41.3	1,392	
SNP	Keith Brooks (incumbent)	29.8	1,004	
Labour	Vaughan Jones†	17.5	589	1,025.9
Independent	Don Shearer	4.7	157	187.8
Conservative	Bill Crawford	3.4	114	117.2
Liberal Democrats	Kevin Diamond	3.0	111	122.5
Electorate: 8,390 Valid: 3,367 Spoilt: 68 Quota: 842 Turnout: 3,435 (40.94%)

=== Inverclyde West ===
- 2007: 1xIndependent; 1xLab; 1xLib Dem
- 2012: 1xIndependent; 1xLab; 1xSNP
- 2007-2012: SNP gain from Lib Dem

Inverclyde West - 3 seats
Party	Candidate	FPv%	Count						
Party	Candidate	FPv%	1	2	3	4	5	6	7
Independent	Ronald Ahlfeld (incumbent)	44.8	1,951						
Labour	Terry Loughran (incumbent)	22.5	991	1,157.9					
SNP	Christopher McEleny	12.2	541	649.2	657.3	682.7	982.4	1,010.3	1,129.2
SNP	Ralph Roberts	6.8	301	359	361.9	368.8			
Conservative	Iain D. MacLeod	5.7	253	331.2	333.9	383.9	394.7		
Liberal	George White (incumbent)	5.1	227	383.5	393.2	463.1	482.6	604.3	
Liberal Democrats	Gordon Anderson	3.3	146	207.7	212				
Electorate: 8,642 Valid: 4,410 Spoilt: 46 Quota: 1,103 Turnout: 4,456 (51.56%)

=== Inverclyde South West ===
- 2007: 1xSNP; 1xLab; 1xLib Dem
- 2012: 1xLab; 1xSNP; 1xLib Dem
- 2007-2012: No change

Inverclyde South West - 3 seats
Party	Candidate	FPv%	Count					
Party	Candidate	FPv%	1	2	3	4	5	6
Labour	Gerry Dorrian (incumbent)	22.6	768	779	789	792	829.2	873.7
SNP	Innes Nelson (incumbent)	22.6	766	772	801	804.3	1,117.9	
Liberal Democrats	Ciano Rebecchi (incumbent)	22.4	759	764	865			
Labour	Colin Jackson	12.2	415	419	430	432.1	443.3	471.5
SNP	John Crowther	11.9	405	413	418	419.5		
Conservative	Duncan Simpson	6.4	217	229				
Independent	Peter Patrick Glancy Campbell	1.8	62					
Electorate: 8,666 Valid: 3,392 Spoilt: 59 Quota: 849 Turnout: 3,451 (39.82%)

== Aftermath ==
On 13 September 2014 Inverclyde South Labour Cllr Vaughan Jones resigned from the party and became an independent in opposition to her party's stance on the Scottish Independence Referendum.
