= 2003 Inverclyde Council election =

2003 Scottish local government election

- 1 May 2003

All 20 seats to Inverclyde Council 11 seats needed for a majority
	First party	Second party	Third party
Party	Liberal Democrats	Labour	Independent
Last election	8 seats, 34.0%	11 seats, 38.5%	0 seats, 0.1%
Seats won	13	6	1
Seat change	▲5	▼5	▲1
Popular vote	13,930	10,232	1,137
Percentage	42.6%	31.3%	3.5%
Swing	▲8.6%	▼7.2%	▲3.4%
- Results by ward

Elections to Inverclyde Council were held on 1 May 2003, the same day as other Scottish Local Government elections and the Scottish Parliament Election.

== Results ==
2003 Inverclyde Council election result
Party	Seats	Gains	Losses	Net gain/loss	Seats %	Votes %	Votes	+/−
Liberal Democrats	13	5	0	▲5	65.0	42.6	13,930	▲8.6
Labour	6	0	6	▼5	30.0	31.3	10,232	▼7.2
Independent	1	1	0	▲1	5.0	3.5	1,137	▲3.4
SNP	0	0	0	Steady	0.0	14.8	4,844	▼6.9
Conservative	0	0	1	▼1	0.0	6.1	1,999	▲1.0
Scottish Socialist	0	0	0	Steady	0.0	1.7	568	New

== Ward results ==
Ward 1
Party	Candidate	Votes	%	±%
Liberal Democrats	Thomas Fyfe	1,097	44.7	+30.7
Conservative	Helen Calvert	970	39.5	−10.9
SNP	Margaret McLeese	225	9.2	−4.8
Labour	Joseph McIlwee	162	6.6	−15.0
Majority		127	5.2	
Turnout		2454		
Liberal Democrats gain from Conservative		Swing		

Ward 2
Party	Candidate	Votes	%	±%
Labour	Allan Robertson	557	39.3	−11.1
SNP	James MacLeod	444	31.3	−0.9
Independent	Joseph Doherty	249	17.5	+17.5
Liberal Democrats	Ronald Hawthorne	137	9.7	−1.3
Conservative	Hugh Miller	32	2.3	+2.3
Majority		113	8.0	−14.6
Turnout		1,419		
Labour hold		Swing		

Ward 3
Party	Candidate	Votes	%	±%
Liberal Democrats	Iain Tucker	632	38.7	+23.8
Labour	Daniel Morrison	615	37.6	−18.4
SNP	Sylvia O'Neill	343	21.0	−8.1
Conservative	Frederick Gallaher	44	2.7	+2.7
Majority		17	1.1	
Turnout		1,634		
Liberal Democrats gain from Labour		Swing		

Ward 4
Party	Candidate	Votes	%	±%
Liberal Democrats	Robert Hill	667	43.4	+15.9
Labour	Helen O'Rourke	561	36.5	+9.7
SNP	Ross McKibben	279	18.2	+6.6
Conservative	John Hunter	30	2.0	−0.4
Majority		106	6.9	−20.4
Turnout		1,537		
Liberal Democrats hold		Swing		

Ward 5
Party	Candidate	Votes	%	±%
Liberal Democrats	Jean Stewart	787	42.4	+17.4
Labour	Margaret Morrison	674	36.4	−10.8
SNP	James Grieve	344	18.6	−3.9
Conservative	Elaine Gallaher	49	2.6	−2.6
Majority		113	6.0	
Turnout		1,854		
Liberal Democrats gain from Labour		Swing		

Ward 6
Party	Candidate	Votes	%	±%
Labour	Stephen McCabe	661	51.3	−5.0
Liberal Democrats	Robert Burns	308	23.9	+6.6
SNP	Francis McFadyen	154	12.0	+12.0
Scottish Socialist	John McLachlan	126	9.8	+9.8
Conservative	Robert Dick	39	3.0	+3.0
Majority		353	27.4	−2.5
Turnout		1,288		
Labour hold		Swing		

Ward 7
Party	Candidate	Votes	%	±%
Independent	Michael McCormick	690	50.1	+50.1
Labour	James O'Rourke	467	33.9	−28.1
Liberal Democrats	Kenneth Shepherd	128	9.3	−4.0
SNP	James Riddell	91	6.6	−18.1
Majority		223	16.2	
Turnout		1,376		
Independent gain from Labour		Swing		

Ward 8
Party	Candidate	Votes	%	±%
Labour	Robert Moran	499	50.3	+0.2
Liberal Democrats	Anne Deighan	317	31.9	+7.3
SNP	William Wilson	177	17.8	−7.5
Majority		182	18.4	−6.4
Turnout		993		
Labour hold		Swing		

Ward 9
Party	Candidate	Votes	%	±%
Labour	David Roach	793	52.8	3.4
Liberal Democrats	George Byng	488	32.5	+6.6
SNP	Stephen Hilton	220	14.7	−4.7
Majority		182	20.3	−16.5
Turnout		1501		
Labour hold		Swing		

Ward 10
Party	Candidate	Votes	%	±%
Liberal Democrats	Archibald Snoddy	682	42.2	+7.0
Labour	Alexander McGhee	554	34.2	−1.0
SNP	Louis Docherty	235	14.5	−6.2
Scottish Socialist	Patricia McCafferty	147	9.1	+9.1
Majority		128	8.0	
Turnout		1,618		
Liberal Democrats gain from Labour		Swing		

Ward 11
Party	Candidate	Votes	%	±%
Liberal Democrats	Alexander Nimmo	1,036	58.1	+8.0
Labour	William Quigg	506	28.4	−3.9
SNP	Charles McGregor	240	13.5	−4.1
Majority		530	29.7	+11.9
Turnout		1,782		
Liberal Democrats hold		Swing		

Ward 12
Party	Candidate	Votes	%	±%
Liberal Democrats	Edward Gallacher	516	39.6	+7.3
Labour	Yvonne Robertson	477	36.6	−6.8
SNP	Fraser Kelly	179	13.7	−10.5
Scottish Socialist	Elizabeth Roders	132	10.1	+10.1
Majority		39	3.0	
Turnout		1,304		
Liberal Democrats gain from Labour		Swing		

Ward 13
Party	Candidate	Votes	%	±%
Labour	Iain McKenzie	576	43.9	−11.1
Liberal Democrats	Allan McGraw	395	30.1	+4.6
SNP	Paul Docherty	179	13.6	−11.9
Scottish Socialist	David Landels	163	12.4	+12.4
Majority		181	13.8	−15.7
Turnout		1,313		
Labour hold		Swing		

Ward 14
Party	Candidate	Votes	%	±%
Labour	Patrick McCormick	469	39.2	−7.8
Liberal Democrats	Kenneth Wilson	417	34.9	+17.2
SNP	Patrick Gillan	266	22.2	−10.6
Independent	Peter Campbell	44	3.7	+1.1
Majority		52	4.3	−9.9
Turnout		1196		
Labour hold		Swing		

Ward 15
Party	Candidate	Votes	%	±%
Liberal Democrats	Luciano Rebecchi	864	59.4	+4.4
Labour	Kevin Mulholland	407	28.0	−5.2
SNP	Cirstaidh Park	183	12.6	−5.8
Majority		457	31.4	+16.2
Turnout		1454		
Liberal Democrats hold		Swing		

Ward 16
Party	Candidate	Votes	%	±%
Liberal Democrats	James Mitchell	1,158	59.6	+0.0
Labour	Christina Boyd	382	19.7	−4.8
SNP	Keith Brooks	226	11.6	−4.2
Conservative	Wilma Strachan	176	9.1	+9.1
Majority		776	39.9	+4.8
Turnout		1,942		
Liberal Democrats hold		Swing		

Ward 17
Party	Candidate	Votes	%	±%
Liberal Democrats	Alan Blair	1,349	61.5	−0.2
Labour	James McLaughlin	402	18.3	−2.3
SNP	Anne Thomson	278	12.7	−5.0
Conservative	James Strachan	166	7.6	+7.6
Majority		947	43.2	+2.1
Turnout		2,195		
Liberal Democrats hold		Swing		

Ward 18
Party	Candidate	Votes	%	±%
Liberal Democrats	George White	805	44.6	+0.8
Labour	Terence Loughran	576	31.9	+0.1
SNP	John Crowther	315	17.4	−7.0
Conservative	Hamilton Cunningham	110	6.1	+6.1
Majority		229	12.7	+0.7
Turnout		1,806		
Liberal Democrats hold		Swing		

Ward 19
Party	Candidate	Votes	%	±%
Liberal Democrats	James Hunter	1,032	51.4	+5.9
Labour	James Bradley	419	20.9	−1.1
SNP	Neil MacGillivray	315	15.7	−2.4
Conservative	Harry Osborn	240	12.0	−2.4
Majority		613	30.5	+7.0
Turnout		2,006		
Liberal Democrats hold		Swing		

Ward 20
Party	Candidate	Votes	%	±%
Liberal Democrats	Eric Forbes	1,115	54.7	+8.5
Labour	William Gallacher	475	23.3	−6.6
SNP	Ian Ramsay	305	15.0	−8.8
Conservative	William Carrick	143	7.0	+7.0
Majority		640	31.4	+15.1
Turnout		2,038		
Liberal Democrats hold		Swing		
