= Larkfield, Greenock =

Scottish council housing estate

Coordinates: 55°56′36″N 4°49′23″W

Larkfield is the largest council housing estate in Greenock, Inverclyde, Scotland.

== Geography ==
The estate is named after Larkfield Farm, Larkfield Road Greenock and Larkfield Road Gourouck are not the same road.

== Education ==
Aileymill and St Andrews primary schools are both situated in Larkfield. River Clyde Homes constructed 42 homes at the old Springfield site. Sacred Heart Primary School is home to the Larkfield Children's Centre.

== Facilities ==
St Andrew's Chapel is on Auchmead Road, as is Ravenscraig Stadium, Inverclyde Athletic's stadium, home to Greenock Juniors F.C. Football Club.

Larkfield has its own online digital community page for residents and businesses, Greenock.

Larkfield estate forms part of the Larkfield, Braeside and Branchton Community Council (LBBCC). River Clyde Homes and Larkfield Housing Association provide social housing and help to buy properties within the estate. A varied mix of privately owned semi-detached dwellings are supplemented with new-build and refurbished local authority stock.

Amenities include a bakery, takeaways, supermarkets, health and beauty, post office and pharmacies. An industrial estate within Larkfield supports local, regional and international companies. This list includes Inverclyde Taxis, McGills Buses and Texas Instruments.

Public transportation links are served by bus service from Greenock to Burns Square. Taxi services are operated by Inverclyde Taxis alongside other private companies. Trains pass every hour on the Glasgow – Wemyss Bay line stopping at nearby Branchton station reach Glasgow in under an hour.
