= Inverclyde Central (ward) =

Electoral ward in Inverclyde, Scotland

Location of the ward

Inverclyde Central is one of the seven wards used to elect members of the Inverclyde Council. It elects three Councillors.

The ward includes eastern parts of the town of Greenock, with neighbourhoods such as Bridgend, Cartsdyke, Ladyburn, Overton and Strone, plus parts of the town centre (south of the Inverclyde Line railway tracks, east of Bank Street, south of Wellington Street and east of Broomhill Street). In 2019, the ward had a population of 11,926.

== Councillors ==
Election	Councillors		
2017	Jim McEleny (SNP)	Michael McCormick (Labour)	Colin Jackson (Labour)
2022	Pam Armstrong (SNP)	Michael McCormick (Labour)	Colin Jackson (Labour)

== Election results ==
=== 2022 Election ===
2022 Inverclyde Council election

Inverclyde Central – 3 seats
Party	Candidate	FPv%	Count				
Party	Candidate	FPv%	1	2	3	4	5
SNP	Pam Armstrong		968				
Labour	Michael McCormick (incumbent)		753				
Labour	Colin Jackson (incumbent)		599	617.26	651.09	675.42	782.88
SNP	Agnes McAuley		231	450.44	452.03	509.05	516.11
Conservative	Ian Bryson		169	170.07	171.09	176.36	
Alba	Jim McEleny (incumbent)		108	115.79	117.82		
Electorate: TBC Valid: 2,828 Spoilt: 108 Quota: 708 Turnout: 2,936

=== 2017 Election ===
2017 Inverclyde Council election

Inverclyde Central – 3 seats
Party	Candidate	FPv%	Count				
Party	Candidate	FPv%	1	2	3	4	5
SNP	Jim McEleny	32.5	973				
Labour	Michael McCormick *	32.4	970				
Labour	Colin Jackson	14.53	435	443.52	600.95	622.37	751.33
Conservative	Ian Bryson	9.22	276	276.92	280.57	302.93	
SNP	Jayne Peberdy	8.52	255	452.29	464.59	477.97	489.66
Liberal Democrats	Kenny Shepherd *	2.84	85	87.3	94.36		
Electorate: TBC Valid: 2,994 Spoilt: 128 Quota: 749 Turnout: 3,122 (41.1%)
