= Park Farm, Port Glasgow =

Housing estate in Inverclyde, Scotland

Coordinates: 55.92604°N 4.64880°W

Park Farm shown within the United Kingdom
(grid reference NS346735)

Park Farm is an urban area of Port Glasgow, Inverclyde, Scotland, built on the site of Park farm which stood near Parkhill Square. It consists of two distinct phases; the original phase stretches uphill from Parkhill Square to Mull Avenue and the second phase (Upper Park Farm) was built south of Mull Avenue in the late 1960s and consists of the streets around Oronsay Avenue. All of the streets take their names from Scottish islands. These include Stroma Avenue, Islay Avenue, Rona Avenue, Pladda Avenue, Westray Avenue, Sandray Avenue, Tiree Avenue, Staffa Avenue, Iona Road, Skye Road and Arran Avenue.

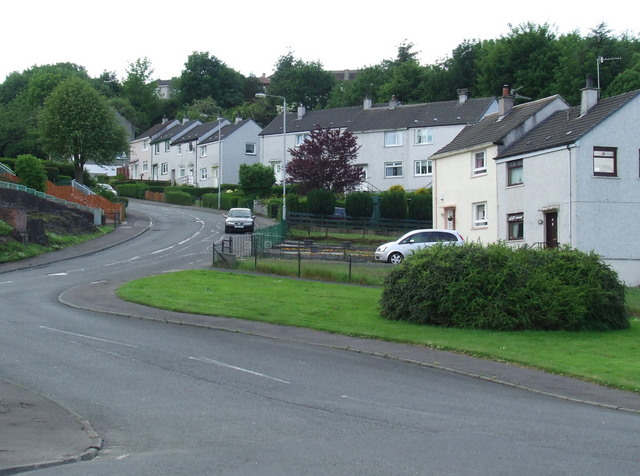
The foot of Arran Avenue

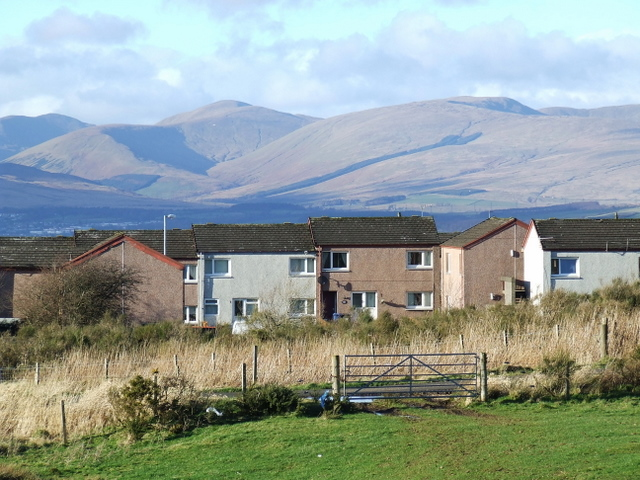
Oronsay Avenue from Kilmacolm Road

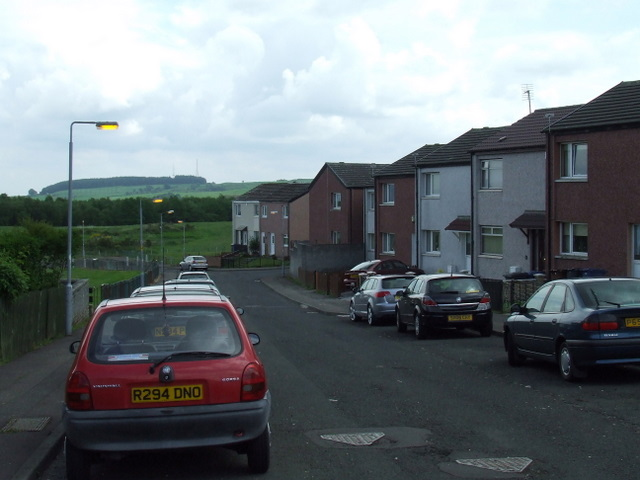
Pladda Avenue

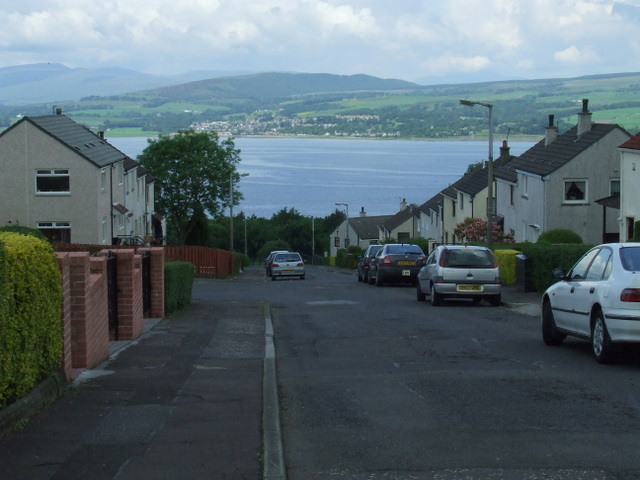
Bute Avenue

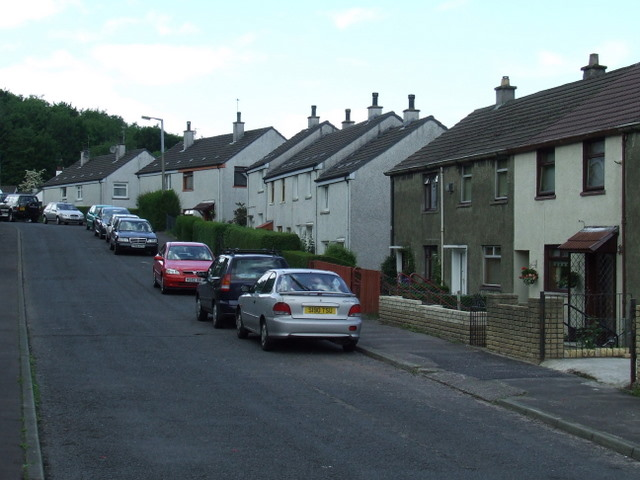
Coll Avenue

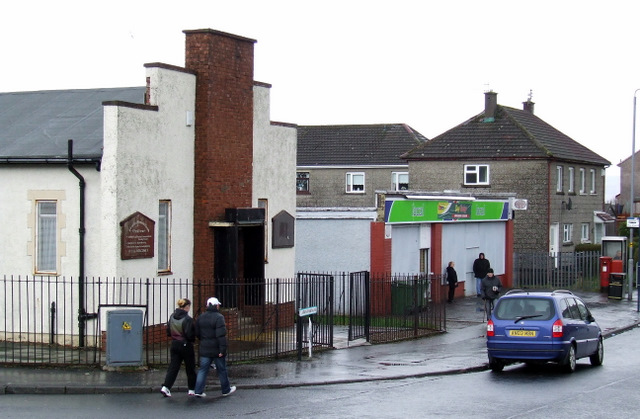
Struthers Memorial Church and Park Farm Post Office
