= List of MPs for constituencies in Scotland (2024–present) =

- Colours on map indicate the party allegiance of each constituency's MP on the day of the 2024 UK election

This is a list of members of Parliament (MPs) elected to the House of Commons of the United Kingdom by Scottish constituencies for the fifty-ninth Parliament of the United Kingdom (2024–present).

It includes MPs elected at the 2024 general election, held on 4 July 2024.

The number of constituencies in Scotland was reduced from 59 to 57 at this election. The Labour Party's vote went up by 16.7% and their number of MPs increased from 1 to 37, mainly in Scotland's Central Belt. This was at the expense of the Scottish National Party (SNP), whose vote share dropped by 15% and their number of MPs reducing to single figures.

Changes of affiliation will be noted at the bottom of the page. MPs who did not serve throughout the Parliament are italicised.

== Composition ==
Affiliation	Members		
Affiliation	Elected in 2024	Current	Difference
Labour Party	37	37	Steady
Scottish National Party	9	8	▼1
Liberal Democrats	6	6	Steady
Conservative Party	5	6	▲1
Total	57	57	Steady

Number of seats by party (at 2024 UK election)
1. Labour (64.9%)
2. Scottish National Party (15.8%)
3. Liberal Democrats (10.5%)
4. Conservative (8.77%)

== MPs ==
MP	Constituency	Party	In constituency since	Majority	
MP	Constituency	Party	In constituency since	Number	%
Zubir Ahmed	Glasgow South West	Labour	2024	3,285	9.2
Douglas Alexander	Lothian East	Labour	2024	13,265	27.7
Scott Arthur	Edinburgh South West	Labour	2024	6,217	13.6
Richard Baker	Glenrothes and Mid Fife	Labour	2024	2,954	3.5
Johanna Baxter	Paisley and Renfrewshire South	Labour	2024	6,527	15.8
Lara Bird	Arbroath and Broughty Ferry	SNP	2026 by-election	5,178	21.7
Kirsty Blackman	Aberdeen North	SNP	2015	1,779	4.2
Andrew Bowie	West Aberdeenshire and Kincardine	Conservative	2017	3,441	7.0
Maureen Burke	Glasgow North East	Labour	2024	4,637	14.6
Irene Campbell	North Ayrshire and Arran	Labour	2024	3,551	8.4
Alistair Carmichael	Orkney and Shetland	Liberal Democrats	2001	7,807	37.8
Wendy Chamberlain	North East Fife	Liberal Democrats	2019	13,479	31.5
John Cooper	Dumfries and Galloway	Conservative	2024	930	2.1
Torcuil Crichton	Na h-Eileanan an Iar	Labour	2024	3,836	28.4
Harriet Cross	Gordon and Buchan	Conservative	2024	878	2.0
Dave Doogan	Angus and Perthshire Glens	SNP	2024 (Note: Doogan was formerly the MP for Angus since 2019 until the constituency was abolished)	4,870	10.3
Graeme Downie	Dunfermline and Dollar	Labour	2024	8,241	18.5
Patricia Ferguson	Glasgow West	Labour	2024	6,446	16.2
Douglas Lumsden	Aberdeen South	Conservative	2019	3,758	8.1
Alan Gemmell	Central Ayrshire	Labour	2024	6,869	16.6
Stephen Gethins (Note: Gethins resigned as an MP on 14 May 2026 after successfully contesting Dundee City East in the 2026 Scottish Parliament election)	Arbroath and Broughty Ferry	SNP	2024	859	1.9
Tracy Gilbert	Edinburgh North & Leith	Labour	2024	7,268	14.7
John Grady	Glasgow East	Labour	2024	3,784	10.6
Christine Jardine	Edinburgh West	Liberal Democrats	2017	16,470	31.4
Lillian Jones	Kilmarnock and Loudoun	Labour	2024	5,129	12.1
Chris Kane	Stirling and Strathallan	Labour	2024	1,394	2.8
John Lamont	Berwickshire, Roxburgh and Selkirk	Conservative	2017	6,599	14.1
Chris Law	Dundee Central	SNP	2024 (Note: Law was formerly the MP for Dundee West since 2015 until the constituency was abolished)	675	1.7
Graham Leadbitter	Moray West, Nairn and Strathspey	SNP	2024	1,001	2.1
Brian Leishman	Alloa and Grangemouth	Labour	2024	6,122	14.9
Seamus Logan	Aberdeenshire North and Moray East	SNP	2024	942	2.4
Douglas Lumsden	Aberdeen South	Conservative	2026 by-election	6,050	20.9
Angus MacDonald	Inverness, Skye and West Ross-shire	Liberal Democrats	2024	2,160	4.5
Douglas McAllister	West Dunbartonshire	Labour	2024	6,010	15.2
Martin McCluskey	Inverclyde and Renfrewshire West	Labour	2024	6,371	13.8
Blair McDougall	East Renfrewshire	Labour	2024	8,421	16.8
Gordon McKee	Glasgow South	Labour	2024	4,154	9.8
Frank McNally	Coatbridge and Bellshill	Labour	2024	6,344	16.4
Kirsty McNeill	Midlothian	Labour	2024	8,167	18.5
David Mundell	Dumfriesshire, Clydesdale and Tweeddale	Conservative	2005	4,242	9.6
Chris Murray	Edinburgh East and Musselburgh	Labour	2024	3,715	8.1
Ian Murray	Edinburgh South	Labour	2010	17,251	36.8
Katrina Murray	Cumbernauld and Kirkintilloch	Labour	2024	4,144	10.1
Susan Murray	Mid Dunbartonshire	Liberal Democrats	2024	9,673	18.4
Pamela Nash	Motherwell, Wishaw and Carluke	Labour	2024	7,085	18.1
Brendan O'Hara	Argyll, Bute and South Lochaber	SNP	2015	6,232	13.9
Gregor Poynton	Livingston	Labour	2024	3,528	7.9
Joani Reid	East Kilbride and Strathaven	Labour	2024	9,057	19.4
Martin Rhodes	Glasgow North	Labour	2024	3,539	10.2
Michael Shanks	Rutherglen	Labour	2024	8,767	20.6
Euan Stainbank	Falkirk	Labour	2024	4,996	11.7
Kenneth Stevenson	Airdrie and Shotts	Labour	2024	7,547	20.7
Elaine Stewart	Ayr, Carrick and Cumnock	Labour	2024	4,154	10.1
Jamie Stone	Caithness, Sutherland and Easter Ross	Liberal Democrats	2017	10,489	22.7
Kirsteen Sullivan	Bathgate and Linlithgow	Labour	2024	8,323	19.8
Alison Taylor	Paisley and Renfrewshire North	Labour	2024	6,333	15.2
Imogen Walker	Hamilton and Clyde Valley	Labour	2024	9,472	22.5
Melanie Ward	Cowdenbeath and Kirkcaldy	Labour	2024	7,248	17.7
Pete Wishart	Perth and Kinross-shire	SNP	2024 (Note: Wishart was formerly the MP for Perth and North Perthshire since 2001 until the constituency was abolished)	4,127	8.2

== See also ==
- 2024 United Kingdom general election in Scotland
- List of MPs elected in the 2024 United Kingdom general election
- List of MPs for constituencies in Wales (2024–present)
