= School debating in Scotland =

Extracurricular activity in Scotland

School debating in Scotland is a competitive activity taken up on an extracurricular basis by many schools across the country. The main format of schools debating in Scotland is British Parliamentary Style, and competitions in this format are mostly run by universities across Scotland, although more national university competitions, such as Oxford and Cambridge, hold regional rounds in Scotland as well. The BP format of debating consists of teams of two from individual schools. However, School debaters also have the opportunity to debate in the Worlds format of debating, if they are selected to represent their country as Team Scotland at the World Schools Debating Championships. Each year, twenty-four school pupils are chosen to trial and from this group a team of five is chosen.

Scotland has won this tournament five times, in 1990, 1999, 2007, 2012 and 2024. They reached the outrounds of the competition every year since they began competing in it, except in the 2013 tournament, held in Antalya, Turkey.

== The Law Society Donald Dewar Memorial Debating Tournament ==
This competition, organised by the Law Society of Scotland, is a Scottish school debating competition, with the trophy currently held by the 2024 winners, Finlay Sayers and Sarah Pym of Broxburn Academy. The tournament is currently sponsored by the Glasgow Bar Association and Simpson and Warwick Solicitors. The 2007 final was won by Craigmount High School of Edinburgh and chaired by Nicola Sturgeon MSP. The High School of Dundee finished second. The 2008 final was won by Joanna Farmer and Michael Sim of Robert Gordon's College, and the High School of Dundee again finished second. In 2009, Allen Farrington and Cosmo Grant from The Glasgow Academy won the trophy. In 2010, the trophy was retained by The Glasgow Academy by Séamus Macdonald McGuigan and Oscar Lee. Craigmount High School dominated the early 2010s, winning the trophy in both 2012 and 2014. In 2015, Jamie MacLeod and Ewan Redpath of Madras College, St Andrews, won the competition. The 2016 final was won by Finlay Allmond and Caitlin Sherret of Nairn Academy. In 2017 Douglas Academy won the final. Peebles High School won in 2018, 2020 and 2021- this makes them and Craigmount High School tied for the most Donald Dewar victories (Craigmounts’ victories being previously stated). The 2019 winners were Bearsden Academy, breaking up the Peebles victories, and the runners up were Balfron Academy. Fortrose Academy won in 2022, with the High School of Glasgow winning second place. In 2023 the winning team was Broxburn Academy’s Emma Bell and Ruby Ferguson, with the runners up being from Balfron. Broxburn won again in 2024, the winning team being Finlay Sayers and Sarah Pym, with Balfron coming second. 2025 saw Nairn Academy win for the second time, with Broxburn coming second. Nairn Academy successfully defended their title in 2026, the third time the school has won the competition, with Bearsden Academy the runners up.

== The Courier and Chartered Institute of Bankers in Scotland Schools Junior Debating Competition ==
This competition is organised by the Courier newspaper, and is open to Junior school debaters in the area covered by the newspaper. It is sponsored by the Chartered Institute of Bankers in Scotland. The competition is in an extended BP format, with three teams on each side rather than the more usual two, and is run on a knock-out basis, with 72 original teams being reduced to six finalists over the course of preparation rounds. Many schools compete for the grand prize, from all over Scotland. The Grand Final is run, with the help of the University of St Andrews Union Debating Society, in Lower Parliament Hall, St Andrews, with the winners receiving a trip to America, and the runners-up a break in London. In the 2002 Grand Final, the judges deemed that the quality of debate was so high that all competing teams were given honorary membership in the University of St Andrews Union Debating Society.

Winners of the 2006/2007 competition were Shona Young and Kirsty Paterson-Hunter of Kinross High School, who spoke in opposition to the motion that 'This House Would Ban Non-Reconstructive Cosmetic Surgery' winning on a unanimous vote. The runners-up were Marianne Inglis and Catherine Lovegrove from Morrison's Academy, who argued for the motion.

Winners of the 2007/2008 competition were Emma Robertson and Ruth Thomson of Morrison's Academy, Crieff. The motion was "This House would ban Gambling" and the team successfully opposed the motion and won an all expenses paid trip to America. Among the finalists were a team from Robert Gordon's, two Morrison's teams, and a team from St John's.

For the 2009-'10 season, the competition will not run, and its future looks to be in turmoil since the main sponsor (CIOBS) pulled out. However, a new competition has been formed to replace it, run with the support of GSK. It started in the spring of 2010. The new competition, the East of Scotland Debater, has since started. Regional heats have taken place, and the final will be held on 4 June in St Andrews University's Parliament Hall. The finalists were Robert Gordon's College, Morrison's Academy, the High School of Dundee, and Forfar Academy.

== The ESU Scotland Juniors Competition ==
The largest competition in Scotland for S1-S3 debaters is run by the English-Speaking Union Scotland. The 2006/7 competition received 113 entries. The competition is in BP format, with four teams of two competing in the debate.

The 2007 grand final took place in the National Galleries of Scotland. The winners were Georgina Barker and Hannah Mackaness of George Heriot's School. The other finalists were Emma Robertson and Catherine Lovegrove of Morrison's Academy, who were the runners-up, as well as St. Thomas Aquinas Secondary School and Dumfries Academy. The 2012 Grand Final took place in the Scottish Parliament building. The finalists were teams from George Heriot's School, Mearns Castle High School, Grove Academy and St. Columba's School. The final was won by the team from St Columba's. The 2014 Grand Final also took place in the Scottish Parliament building. The finalists were teams from George Heriot's School, Dollar Academy, George Watson's College and Douglas Academy. The final was won by the team from Douglas Academy. The 2015 Grand Final was hosted by Standard Life in Edinburgh. The finalists were teams from Clifton Hall School, Morrison's Academy, George Watson's College and Renfrew High School. The final was won by the team from Clifton Hall School.

== Aberdeen Debater Schools Competition ==
Year	R1 Motion	R2 Motion	R3 Motion	Final	Winner
2003	THW make voting compulsory	THW legalise euthanasia	THW plan for peace by preparing for war	THW place further restrictions on asylum seekers entering the UK	Aberdeen Grammar School
2004	THBT nuclear power is the future	THBT there is no place for school uniform in today's society	THW withdraw British troops from Iraq with immediate effect	THW abolish child labour in the third world	High School of Dundee
2005	THBT ASBOs are ineffective	THS the policy of shoot-to-kill against suspected suicide bombers	THW introduce compulsory organ donation	THW ban advertising aimed at children	Robert Gordon's College
2006	THBT political parties should be funded by the state	THW ban home schooling	THW boycott the Beijing Olympics	THW prosecute the parents of obese children	High School of Dundee
2007	THW vote for an independent Scotland	THW introduce compulsory national service	THW torture terrorist suspects in the interest of national security	THBT juries in the trials of under-18s should be composed of their peers	?
2008	THW ban experiments on animals	THW prevent individuals with a criminal record from holding elected office	THBT the BBC cannot justify the licence fee	THBT foetal abnormality does not justify late abortion	?
2009	THW scrap the war on drugs	?	?	?	?
Jan - 2011	THW abolish NATO	THBT members of extremist political parties should not be allowed to teach in schools	THBT tax payers should fund the Royal Wedding of Kate and William	THBT developing countries should pay university tuition fees for female students only	?
Nov - 2011	THW assassinate dictators of oppressive regimes	THW abolish the right to strike	THW ban Islamic women from wearing the veil in Britain	THW privatise all universities	?
2012	THBT the UK should leave the EU	THW give prisoners the vote	THW ban designer babies	THBT hip hop does more harm than good	Robert Gordon's College
2013	THBT the Arab Spring has not resulted in positive change	THR the commercialisation of Christmas	THW allow euthanasia	(in Harry Potter land) THW tell the Muggles everything	?
2015	THW give refugees the right to vote	THW not prosecute non-violent offenders motivated by social justice during US race riots or protests	THW introduce gender-neutral schools in the UK	THW allow military personnel to opt out of military operations based on conscious objections	St Columba's
Apr - 2025 (Juniors)	THP to live as a farmer rather than an office worker	THW ban schools from issuing homework to students	THO the culture of toxic positivity	THBT Scotland should repatriate the Loch Ness Monster to England	Aberdeen Grammar School
Nov - 2025 (Seniors)	THBT New Year's Resolutions do more harm than good	TH, as a progressive Labour MP, would join Your Party	THBT social media companies should be held legally liable for hate speech on their platforms	THW run a production of “Wicked” instead of “The Wizard of Oz” as the school play	Aberdeen Grammar School
2026	This House regrets the rise of fem-vertising	This House believes that governments should prioritise universal basic services over universal basic income	This House opposes the vilification of voter apathy	This House, as a tribute from District 12, would rather be reaped for the first Quarter Quell than for the second	Dingwall Academy

== Glasgow University Union Schools Debating competition ==
Year	R1 Motion	R2 Motion	R3 Motion	R4 Motion	Final Motion	Winner	Top Speaker
2003	THBT if you're old enough to pay taxes, you're old enough to vote	THW rather have a presidential limo than a royal carriage	THW kill killers	—N/a	THBT George W Bush is the greatest threat to world peace	Aberdeen Grammar School	?
2004	TH Disagrees with the redeployment of the Black Watch in Iraq	THBT there should be no doctor/patient confidentiality for those under 16	THW remove the charitable status of fee-paying schools	—N/a	THW create an independent state of Palestine	?	?
2005	THW ban junk food in schools	THW reform the house of lords	THW adopt a shoot to kill policy	—N/a	THBT politicians do not have a right to a private life	?	?
2006	THBT religion has no place in school uniform	THS Scottish independence	THW support assisted suicide	—N/a	THW take pre-emptive military action against North Korea	High School of Dundee	?
2007	THW legalise euthanasia	THW pay a salary to mothers who stay at home	THW include Christian references in the EU constitutional treaty	—N/a	TH defends Musharraf's right to rule	?	?
2008	THW teach creationism alongside evolutionary theory in the science classroom	THBT social networking sites do more harm than good	THW ban extremist political parties from standing in elections	THW invade Zimbabwe	TH fears a resurgent Russia	?	?
2009	THW legalise all drugs	THW ban prisoners from publishing accounts of their crimes	THW force feed anorexics	THBT private education is pernicious and should be halted immediately	THBT the military targeting of any place of worship is a crime against humanity	?	?
2010	THW use torture in the interrogation of terror suspects	THW make Gaelic compulsory in schools	THW make foreign aid conditional on the promotion of women's rights	THW impose harsher sentences on celebrity criminals	THW legalise gay marriage	Dollar Academy	Dollar Academy
2011	THW make travellers travel	THBT occupation should not be used as a tool of political discourse	THW ban advertising aimed at children	THW enforce random drug testing in schools	THW offer military assistance to resistance groups that support democratic change in nations	Dollar Academy	?
2012	THW ban strikes for teachers	THW criminalise hate speech on social media	THW introduce quotas for women on Olympic teams	THW support an Israeli pre-emptive strike on Iran	THW re-elect Barack Obama	?	?
2013	THW ban the sale and consumption of alcohol	THBT during an economic crisis the UK govt should suspend all aid to 3rd world countries	THW make it compulsory for fathers to take parental leave from work	THS Earth First in using illegal tactics against groups that may harm the environment	THBT the Scottish govt should use the national curriculum to promote Scottish nationalism in Schools	?	?
2014	THBT individuals should pay for their own Higher Education	THW impose a sin tax on products containing meat	THBT the West should actively support armed uprisings against authoritarian regimes	THBT developed countries should not accept skilled migrants from developing countries	THW reintroduce mandatory national service for young people in the UK	Stewart's Melville College	?
2015	THBT the government should fund only degrees that have a high graduate employment rate	THW make voting compulsory in all elections	THW introduce a 50% quota for women on the boards of large companies	THW replace juries in criminal trials with a panel of judges	THBT the EU should force Britain to accept a substantially higher number of refugees	High School of Dundee	?
2016	?	?	?	?	THS the military's use of Facebook Live in combat situations	Stewart's Melville College	?
2017	?	THBT individuals that partake in risky behaviour should pay higher taxes	THBT women from privileged backgrounds should not be allowed to be leaders of feminist movements/groups	THW make voting in national elections compulsory	?	?	?
2019	THW make the teaching of Modern Political Studies mandatory in schools	?	THW allow voters to buy and sell their votes	?	?	?	?
2021	THR the narrative you should respect your elders	THBT social movements should predominantly rely on youth engagement	THO the glamorisation of professional video game streamers	?	?	St Columba's	?
2022	THW set a minimum and maximum age cap on elected democratic representatives	THBT all national economic policy (taxation, monetary policy, tariffs, etc) should be set by an appointed panel of economists rather than by elected officials	THBT the institutionalisation of art does more harm than good	This House Prefers leaderless social movements as opposed to one with clearly identifiable leaders	TH, as the otter, W Remain in the Zoo	Broxburn Academy	Broxburn Academy
2023	THBT people should have the legal right to sue their parents for a bad upbringing	THW ban AI generated art	THS giving environmental personhood to internationally recognised important environmental spaces (e.g. Mount Everest, the Amazon) as a form of conservation	THW require that all countries allocate a fixed percentage of their GDP to fund global poverty alleviation	THP a world in which the majority of people are pessimistic about human nature	Dollar Academy	Dollar Academy
2024	THS protectionism in developing countries	THR the influence of TikTok on the music industry	THP World 1 over World 2	THP direct democracy over representative democracy	THW abolish private schools	Broxburn Academy	Broxburn Academy
2025	THW establish a permanent city for the Olympic Games	THW accept the offer and go to university	THS political revolutions being youth-led (e.g. the Gen Z Protests in Nepal or the July Revolution in Bangladesh)	Assuming it were logistically feasible, THW elect the Pope through direct voting by all Catholics rather than by the College of Cardinals	THBT the Special Relationship does more harm than good	Broxburn Academy	Broxburn Academy

The 2010 tournament is believed to have been held on Monday, 1 November and the winners were Calum Worsley and Ruth Cameron (1st proposition) of Dollar Academy "A". The other finalists included Dollar Academy "C" (Thomas Clode and Anna George) and George Heriot's "A". They are believed to have debated the motion: "This House would legalise gay marriage."

Forty teams from all over Scotland and northern England competed debating four motions: "This House would use torture in the interrogation of terror suspects"; "This House would make Gaelic compulsory in schools"; and "This House would make foreign aid conditional on the promotion of women's rights"; "This house would impose harsher sentences on celebrity criminals".

== Edinburgh University Schools ==
Year	R1 Motion	R2 Motion	R3 Motion	Final Motion	Winner	Best Speaker
2011	THBT the state should forcibly remove the children of underage parents	THW arm all police officers with guns	THW make voting in elections a condition for receiving state benefits	?	?	Aberdeen Grammar School
2012	THW ban arranged marriages	THBT, in times of recession, the government should cease the funding of the arts	THW ban media coverage of police brutality	THW make the forced conscription of soldiers a war crime	Dollar Academy	George Heriot's
2013	?	?	?	?	George Watson's	St Columba's
2014	?	THW give doctors, not parents, the final say on medical decisions concerning children	?	?	George Heriot's	St Columba's
2015	?	?	?	?	High School of Dundee	George Watson's
2016	?	?	?	?	High School of Dundee	George Watson's
2023	THW introduce compulsory ethics classes at all levels of education	THP a world in which all humans can measure the amount of happiness they'll experience in a relationship before entering it	TH, as a recent graduate, would pick a self-fulfilling job over a high-paying one	THR the popularisation of anti-elite satire content (e.g. The White Lotus, The Menu, Triangle of Sadness, Succession)	St Leondards School	Dollar Academy
2024	TH, as the European Union, would not grant membership to Scotland in the case of Scottish independence	THP artists who write love songs about general experiences of love, rather than specific personal experiences	Assuming capacity, THP that parents choose to be actively involved in their child's schoolwork as opposed to prioritising academic independence	THP the Jedi philosophy to the Sith philosophy	Broxburn Academy	Dollar Academy
2025	THW include community service in educational curricula	THW ban zero-hour contracts	THS the rise of social media platforms designed for tracking and sharing hobbies (e.g. Goodreads, Duolingo, Letterboxd, RateYourMusic)	As an author seeking to critique society, THW set their narrative in a utopian rather than a dystopian world	Larbert High School / Hyndland Secondary School	Broxburn Academy
2026	THBT schools should adopt a specialist education system over a generalist education system.	THW assassinate dictators	THW ban advertising	THP the life of the Athenian over the life of the Spartan	Larbert High School / St Ninian’s High School	Larbert High School / St Ninian’s High School

== St Andrews University Schools ==
Year	R1 Motion	R2 Motion	R3 Motion	R4 Motion	Final Motion	Winner
2009	THW ban violent video games	THW end the right to strike	THW ban the payment of ransoms	—N/a	?	?
2011	THW raise the UK retirement age	THW prohibit software in media to cosmetically enhance models	THBT the UK should give development aid only to democracies	?	?	?
2014	?	?	?	?	THW negotiate with terrorists	Stewart's Melville College
2019	THW ban all essential service workers from striking	THS duty to rescue laws	THR the romanticisation of motherhood	THS a maximum voting age	?	?
2022	THW give doctors, not parents, control over children's medical decisions	THW make trade union membership compulsory for all workers	In a world where superheroes exist, THW require superheroes to publicly reveal their identity	—N/a	TH, as the Scottish Conservative Party, would split from the UK Party and completely rebrand itself	High School of Dundee
2023	THBT football clubs should fire managers who underperform for more than one season	THP that universities choose candidates based on their own internal review systems (such as interviews, internal tests, applications, etc.), rather than based on school results	When recovering during and after periods of economic downturn, THW prioritise direct spending (e.g. infrastructure projects, jobs programmes), as opposed to giving citizens money to spend themselves (e.g. tax cuts, specific stimulus packages)	THP a multi-party system (e.g. Labour, SNP, Conservatives, Greens, Lib Dems) to a two-party system (e.g. Democrats, Republicans)	THBT childhood years are the best years of your life	Dollar Academy
2024	THS Scottish Independence	THP that school students’ grades are based purely on exams rather than purely on continuous assessment of all their work throughout the year.	In times of economic crisis, THBT the government should increase funding for public services rather than decrease it.	THO celebrities being seen as leaders within the feminist movement (e.g. Taylor Swift, Emma Watson, Lizzo)	THW let the truth fly free	Dollar Academy
2025	THR the narrative that childhood friendships should be maintained into adulthood	THP general higher education to specialised higher education	THBT climate advocacy groups should include anti-AI messaging in their campaigns	THBT Labour will lose their majority in the 2029 general election	TH, as a moderately powerful superhero, would choose to join a superhero team over going solo	Dollar Academy
2026	THBT governments should encourage the mass distribution of AI "companions" to socially isolated individuals	THS climate alarmism	THO the narrative that people are meant to find their "perfect match"	THS the introduction of price caps on essential food products in Scotland	THBT a religious life is more fulfilling than an irreligious life	Dingwall Academy/Dollar Academy

== YSS Schools' Mace ==
Year	Prepared Preliminary-Round Motion	Quarter-Final Motion	Semi-Final Motion	Grand Final Motion	Winner	Novice Winner
2023	—N/a	—N/a	THW introduce a Universal Basic Income	THR the rise of generative AI	Broxburn Academy	—N/a
2024	THW require all police officers in the UK to wear body cameras when on duty	THW ban the use of drones in all warfare	THS the legalisation of assisted dying	THW rather live in a benevolent dictatorship than a weak democracy	St Columba's	—N/a
2025	THS the rise of music streaming services, such as Spotify and Apple Music	THW implement quotas for domestic players in national football leagues	THBT the UK should return the Elgin Marbles	THW offer dictators immunity from prosecution in exchange for giving up power	Broxburn Academy	Currie High School
2026	THBT government should actively employ social media influencers in their communications strategy	THBT central banks should be independent from governments	THR the rise of reboot culture	THP adversarial legal systems to inquisitorial legal systems	Broxburn Academy	Stewart's Melville College / The Mary Erskine School
2027	THBT developing countries should prohibit the construction of hyperscale data centres	—N/a	—N/a	—N/a	—N/a	—N/a

The YSS Schools' Mace is a debating competition open to schools across Scotland. The Mace runs in the British Parliamentary Style of debating. In the qualifying heats there are three rounds, one motion being long preparation and two being given on the day, and the top teams are chosen to move on to the finals day. The finals day also has three rounds (all long prep) where the winners of each debate are allowed to progress to the next round. The 2024 winners of the Mace were Sophie Hannigan and Callum Hendry of St Columba's, the other team in the final being Doller Academy's Natalie Yeung and Logan Moss. The same St Columba's team were also the 2023 runners up, with that year's winners being Emma Bell and Emma Crow of Broxburn Academy (with Lucy Spencer speaking in the qualifiers).

== Other tournaments ==
- The Glasgow University Union Schools' Debating Tournament
- The University of Dundee Schools' Competition
- The University of St Andrews Senior Schools' Debating Competition.
- Aberdeen University Debater Schools' Competition
- Edinburgh University Schools' Competition
- Edinburgh University Juniors Schools' Debating Competition
- Robert Gordon's Juniors School's Debating Competition
- The Ayrshire Debating Cup was established in 2023, hosted by Wellington School.
