= 2024 United Kingdom general election in Scotland =

- 4 July 2024

All 57 Scottish seats in the House of Commons
- Turnout: 59.2% (▼8.4 pp)
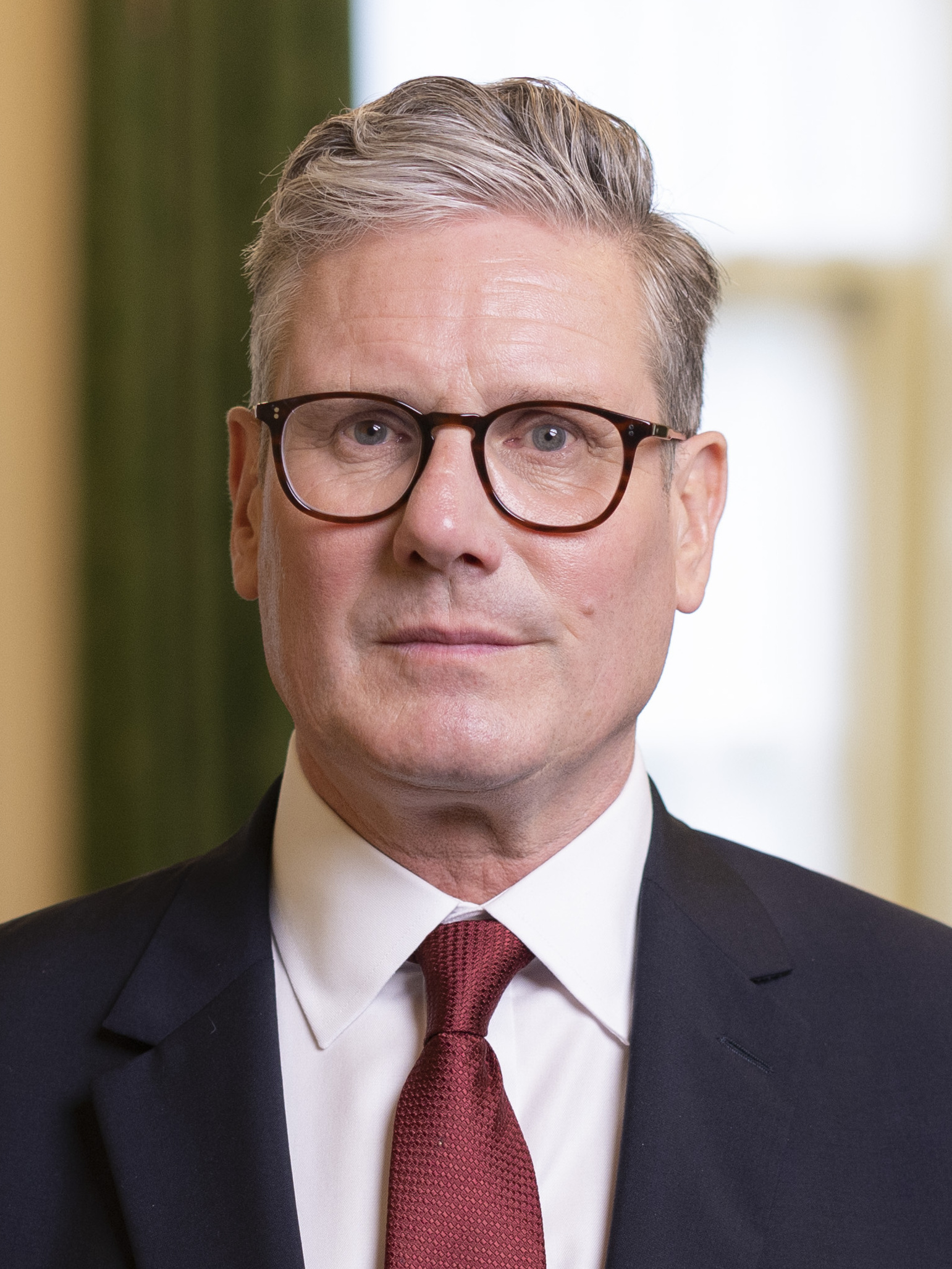

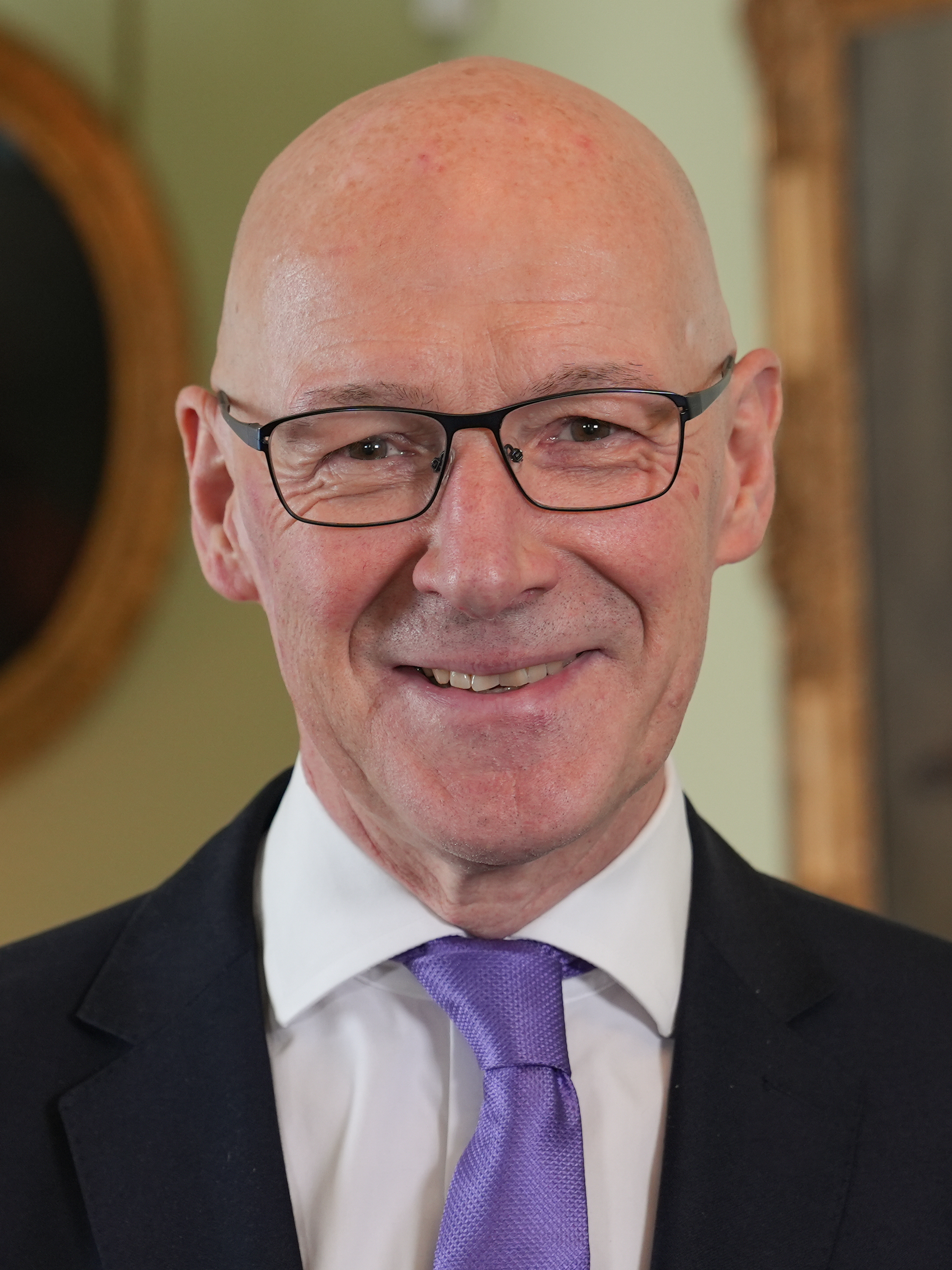

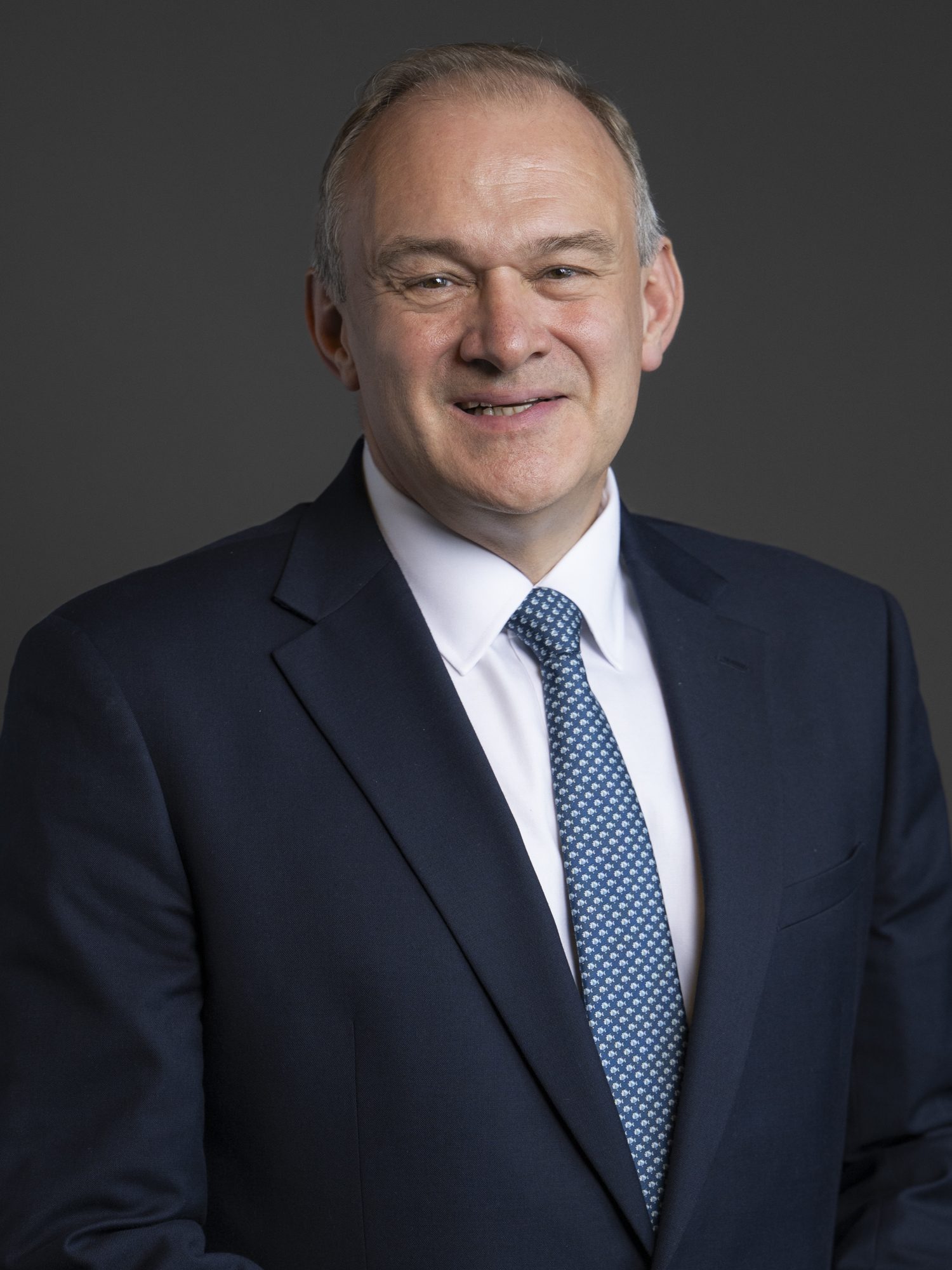

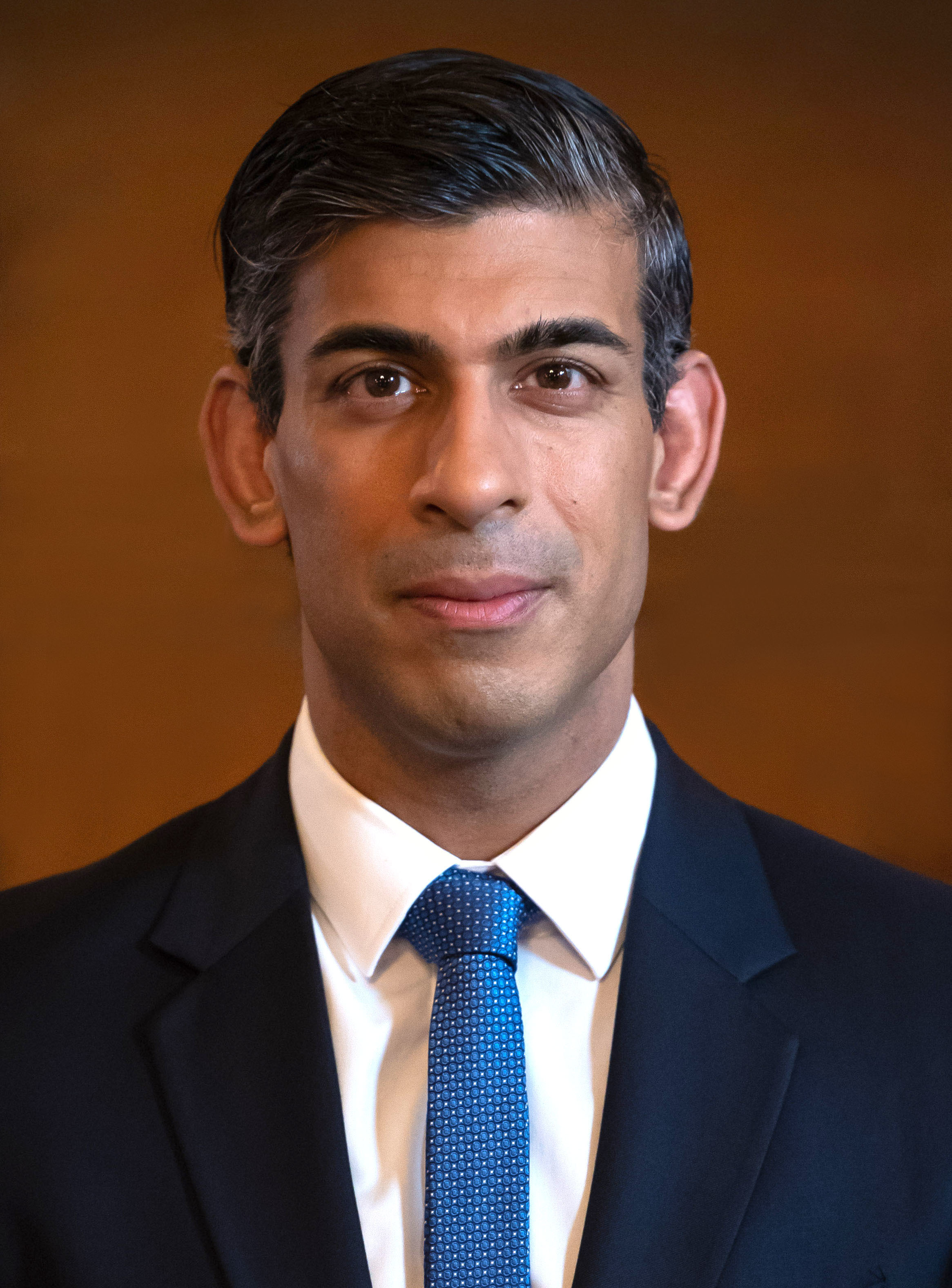
	First party	Second party
Leader	Keir Starmer	John Swinney
Party	Labour	SNP
Leader since	4 April 2020	6 May 2024
Leader's seat	Holborn and St Pancras	Did not stand
Last election	1 seat, 18.6%	48 seats, 45.0%
Seats before	2	43
Seats won	37	9
Seat change	▲36	▼39
Popular vote	851,897	724,758
Percentage	35.3%	30.0%
Swing	▲16.7 pp	▼15.0 pp
	Third party	Fourth party
Leader	Ed Davey	Rishi Sunak
Party	Liberal Democrats	Conservative
Leader since	27 August 2020	24 October 2022
Leader's seat	Kingston and Surbiton	Richmond and Northallerton
Last election	4 seats, 9.5% (Note: The notional results of the last election using the new (2024–present) constituencies would have given the Liberal Democrats 2 seats, not 4)	6 seats, 25.1%
Seats before	4	7
Seats won	6	5
Seat change	▲2	▼1
Popular vote	234,228	307,344
Percentage	9.7%	12.7%
Swing	▲0.2 pp	▼12.4 pp
- Results by constituency

On 4 July 2024, the 2024 United Kingdom general election was held in Scotland, to elect all 650 members of the House of Commons, including the 57 Scottish seats.

The election saw a resurgence of Labour within Scotland, with the party winning 37 seats, an increase of 36 from the previous election and becoming the largest party in Scotland for the first time since 2010. The Liberal Democrats also saw gains, increasing their Scottish representation in Parliament from four seats to six. The Scottish National Party, the dominant party in Scotland since 2007, saw a collapse of support in which they lost 39 seats, bringing their total from 48 seats won at the previous election to nine. This was their worst Westminster election result since 2010. The Conservative Party lost one seat, taking their total down to five. Turnout dropped to 59%, eclipsed for the first time by a preceding Scottish Parliament election (63.5%). This was a reduction in turnout of 8.4% from 2019 and in a few constituencies the turnout was down 10%.

== Background ==
The Scottish National Party (SNP) suffered political turmoil through having multiple party leaders and First Ministers including Nicola Sturgeon, Humza Yousaf and John Swinney, as well as the Operation Branchform police investigation into the party's finances. Sturgeon resigned following heavy criticism for her positions on gender reforms and claimed occupational burnout was the reason for her resignation, while Yousaf resigned amid a government crisis following his termination of a power-sharing agreement with the Scottish Greens. Swinney assumed the leadership after being elected unopposed. Like the Conservative Party in the UK, the SNP's popularity also suffered from being in government for a long time, which led to speculation that Scottish Labour could win the election for the first time since their near-wipeout in the 2015 general election.

== Opinion polls ==
All polling companies listed here are members of the British Polling Council (BPC) and abide by its disclosure and sample size rules.

The dates for these opinion polls range from the 2019 general election on 12 December to the election day itself.

=== Poll results ===
Graph of opinion polls conducted in Scotland

Date(s) conducted	Pollster	Client	Sample size	SNP	Con	Lab	LD	Grn	Ref	Others	Lead
4 Jul 2024	2024 general election		–	30.0%	12.7%	35.3%	9.7%	3.8%	7.0%	1.6%	5.3
28 Jun – 2 Jul 2024	Savanta	The Scotsman	1,083	34%	15%	31%	9%	3%	6%	2%	3
24–28 Jun 2024	More in Common	N/A	1,008	30%	16%	35%	9%	2%	7%	1%	5
26–27 Jun 2024	Redfield & Wilton	N/A	1,200	32%	11%	38%	7%	3%	8%	1%	6
24–26 Jun 2024	Norstat	The Sunday Times	-	31%	13%	35%	8%	3%	8%	2%	4
21–25 Jun 2024	Savanta	The Scotsman	1,042	34%	14%	34%	7%	–	–	7%	Tie
21–25 Jun 2024	Survation	Ballot Box Scotland	1,022	31%	14%	37%	7%	3%	8%	1%	6
20–25 Jun 2024	YouGov	Sky News	1,059	29%	11%	35%	11%	5%	8%	1%	6
14–18 Jun 2024	Savanta	The Scotsman	1,069	33%	15%	38%	7%	–	–	7%	5
14–18 Jun 2024	YouGov	N/A	1,146	31%	11%	34%	7%	6%	11%	1%	3
11–14 Jun 2024	Norstat	The Sunday Times	1,050	30%	14%	34%	9%	4%	7%	2%	4
5–10 Jun 2024	Opinium	N/A	1,017	34%	14%	35%	8%	4%	5%	1%	1
3–9 Jun 2024	Ipsos	STV News	1,136	36%	13%	36%	5%	3%	4%	2% Alba on 1% Other on 1%	Tie
3–7 Jun 2024	YouGov	N/A	1,068	30%	13%	34%	8%	6%	7%	2%	4
1–2 Jun 2024	Redfield & Wilton	N/A	1,000	29%	17%	39%	8%	3%	4%	2% Alba on 1% Other on 1%	10
24–28 May 2024	Savanta	The Scotsman	1,067	33%	17%	37%	7%	–	–	5%	4
23–27 May 2024	Survation	True North	1,026	32%	17%	36%	9%	–	–	6%	4
22–25 May 2024	More in Common	N/A	1,016	30%	17%	35%	10%	3%	4%	1%	5
22 May	Rishi Sunak announces that a general election will be held on 4 July 2024										
13–17 May 2024	YouGov	N/A	1,114	29%	12%	39%	8%	7%	4%	2%	10
8–9 May 2024	Redfield & Wilton	N/A	1,078	31%	14%	38%	8%	4%	4%	1% Alba on 1% Other on 0%	7
6–8 May	John Swinney is elected Leader of the Scottish National Party and First Minister of Scotland										
3–8 May 2024	Savanta	The Scotsman	1,080	33%	17%	37%	7%	–	–	4%	4
30 Apr – 3 May 2024	Norstat	The Sunday Times	1,014	29%	16%	34%	8%	4%	6%	4% Alba on 3% Other on 1%	5
29 Apr 2024	Humza Yousaf announces his resignation as First Minister of Scotland.										
26–29 Apr 2024	YouGov	N/A	1,043	33%	14%	34%	8%	4%	5%	2%	1
9–12 Apr 2024	Norstat	The Sunday Times	1,086	32%	16%	32%	9%	4%	5%	3% Alba on 2% Other on 1%	Tie
6–7 Apr 2024	Redfield & Wilton	N/A	1,000	32%	17%	33%	8%	2%	5%	2% Alba on 2% Other on 0%	1
25 Mar – 2 Apr 2024	YouGov	N/A	1,100	31%	14%	33%	7%	5%	7%	1%	2
10–11 Mar 2024	Redfield & Wilton	N/A	1,000	34%	16%	34%	6%	4%	4%	1% Alba on 1% Other on 0%	Tie
14–20 Feb 2024	Survation	Quantum Communications	1,043	38%	15%	33%	8%	–	–	7%	5
3–4 Feb 2024	Redfield & Wilton	N/A	1,000	33%	18%	34%	8%	2%	4%	1% Alba on 1% Other on 0%	1
25–31 Jan 2024	Ipsos	STV News	1,005	39%	14%	32%	6%	4%	–	5%	7
23–25 Jan 2024	Survation	True North	1,029	36%	16%	34%	8%	–	–	7%	2
22–25 Jan 2024	Norstat	The Sunday Times	1,007	33%	16%	36%	7%	–	–	8%	3
9–11 Jan 2024	Redfield & Wilton	N/A	1,040	35%	17%	35%	9%	2%	2%	1%	Tie
26–27 Nov 2023	Redfield & Wilton	N/A	1,054	34%	17%	36%	6%	3%	3%	0%	2
20–26 Nov 2023	Ipsos	N/A	990	40%	15%	30%	6%	3%	–	5%	10
29–30 Oct 2023	Redfield & Wilton	N/A	1,092	32%	23%	32%	8%	2%	2%	1%	Tie
20–25 Oct 2023	YouGov	Scottish Elections Study	1,200	32%	16%	38%	6%	4%	–	4%	6
6–11 Oct 2023	Savanta	The Scotsman	1,018	35%	19%	35%	6%	–	–	4%	Tie
2–6 Oct 2023	YouGov	N/A	1,028	33%	20%	32%	5%	5%	2%	2%	1
5 Oct 2023	Rutherglen and Hamilton West by-election										
4–5 Oct 2023	Redfield & Wilton	N/A	1,095	34%	21%	32%	9%	2%	–	2%	4
5–14 Sep 2023	Opinium	Tony Blair Institute	1,004	37%	18%	28%	8%	4%	–	4%	9
8–13 Sep 2023	YouGov	The Times	1,103	38%	16%	27%	7%	6%	4%	2%	11
2–4 Sep 2023	Redfield & Wilton	N/A	1,100	35%	15%	35%	8%	4%	–	3%	Tie
15–18 Aug 2023	Survation	True North	1,022	37%	17%	35%	6%	–	–	5%	2
3–8 Aug 2023	YouGov	The Times	1,086	36%	15%	32%	6%	6%	3%	2%	4
5–6 Aug 2023	Redfield & Wilton	N/A	1,050	37%	17%	34%	7%	2%	–	3%	3
1–2 Jul 2023	Redfield & Wilton	N/A	1,030	35%	21%	32%	7%	2%	–	3%	3
23–28 Jun 2023	Survation	–	2,026	37%	17%	34%	9%	–	–	4%	3
12–15 Jun 2023	Panelbase	The Sunday Times	1,007	34%	18%	34%	7%	–	–	7%	Tie
9–14 Jun 2023	Savanta	The Scotsman	1,018	38%	17%	34%	7%	–	–	4%	4
9–13 Jun 2023	YouGov	Scottish Elections Study	1,200	33%	17%	36%	7%	4%	–	3%	3
3–5 Jun 2023	Redfield & Wilton	N/A	1,466	37%	20%	28%	9%	3%	–	3%	9
15–21 May 2023	Ipsos MORI	STV News	1,090	41%	16%	29%	6%	3%	–	4%	12
27 Apr – 3 May 2023	Survation	True North	1,009	38%	18%	31%	9%	2%	–	4%	7
30 Apr – 2 May 2023	Redfield & Wilton	N/A	1,295	35%	18%	32%	9%	3%	–	3%	3
17–20 Apr 2023	YouGov	The Times	1,032	37%	17%	28%	8%	5%	2%	2%	9
29 Mar – 3 Apr 2023	Survation	N/A	1,001	40%	17%	32%	7%	1%	–	3%	8
31 Mar – 1 Apr 2023	Redfield & Wilton	N/A	1,000	36%	19%	31%	10%	2%	–	3%	5
28–31 Mar 2023	Savanta	The Scotsman	1,009	39%	19%	33%	6%	–	–	4%	6
28–30 Mar 2023	Panelbase	The Sunday Times	1,089	39%	19%	31%	5%	–	–	6%	8
27 Mar 2023	Humza Yousaf is elected leader of the Scottish National Party										
9–13 Mar 2023	YouGov	Sky News	1,002	39%	16%	29%	6%	6%	3%	1%	10
8–10 Mar 2023	Survation	Diffley Partnership	1,037	40%	18%	32%	6%	2%	–	3%	8
7–10 Mar 2023	Panelbase	Scot Goes Pop	1,013	40%	16%	33%	6%	–	–	5%	7
2–5 Mar 2023	Redfield & Wilton	N/A	1,050	39%	22%	29%	6%	2%	–	3%	10
17–20 Feb 2023	YouGov	The Times	1,017	38%	19%	29%	6%	4%	2%	2%	9
15–17 Feb 2023	Survation	N/A	1,034	43%	17%	30%	6%	–	–	3%	13
15–17 Feb 2023	Savanta	The Scotsman	1,004	42%	17%	32%	6%	–	–	3%	10
10–15 Feb 2023	YouGov	Scottish Election Study	1,239	38%	16%	35%	6%	3%	–	3%	3
1–7 Feb 2023	Survation	N/A	TBA	42%	18%	29%	6%	–	–	0%	13
23–26 Jan 2023	YouGov	The Sunday Times	1,088	42%	15%	29%	6%	3%	3%	2%	13
10–12 Jan 2023	Survation	True North	1,002	43%	18%	29%	7%	–	–	2%	14
22 Dec – 1 Jan 2023	Survation	Scotland in Union	1,025	44%	16%	31%	6%	–	–	1%	13
16–21 Dec 2022	Savanta	The Scotsman	1,048	43%	19%	30%	6%	–	–	2%	13
6–9 Dec 2022	YouGov	The Times	1,090	43%	14%	29%	6%	4%	3%	1%	14
28 Nov – 5 Dec 2022	Ipsos MORI	STV News	1,045	51%	13%	25%	6%	3%	–	0%	26
26–27 Nov 2022	Redfield & Wilton	N/A	1,000	41%	16%	31%	8%	2%	–	3%	10
7–11 Oct 2022	Panelbase	Alba Party	1,000+	42%	16%	30%	6%	2%	–	2%	12
5–7 Oct 2022	Panelbase	The Sunday Times	1,017	45%	15%	30%	5%	–	–	4%	15
30 Sep – 4 Oct 2022	YouGov	The Times	1,067	45%	12%	31%	7%	3%	1%	1%	14
30 Sep – 4 Oct 2022	ComRes	The Scotsman	1,029	46%	15%	30%	8%	–	–	1%	16
28–29 Sep 2022	Survation	Scotland in Union	1,011	44%	15%	31%	6%	–	–	4%	13
17–19 Aug 2022	Panelbase	The Sunday Times	1,133	44%	20%	23%	8%	–	–	5%	21
29 Jun – 1 Jul 2022	Panelbase	The Sunday Times	1,010	47%	19%	23%	8%	–	–	3%	24
23–28 Jun 2022	Savanta ComRes	The Scotsman	1,029	46%	18%	25%	8%	–	–	3%	21
23–29 May 2022	Ipsos	STV News	1,000	44%	19%	23%	10%	3%	–	2%	21
18–23 May 2022	YouGov	The Times	1,115	46%	19%	22%	6%	3%	1%	2%	24
5 May 2022	Local elections held in Scotland										
26–29 Apr 2022	Panelbase	The Sunday Times	1,009	42%	21%	24%	7%	–	–	5%	18
25–31 Mar 2022	BMG	The Herald	1,012	42%	19%	26%	6%	4%	–	2%	16
24–28 Mar 2022	Survation	Ballot Box Scotland	1,002	45%	19%	27%	6%	–	–	2%	18
1–4 Feb 2022	Panelbase	The Sunday Times	1,128	44%	20%	24%	8%	2%	–	2%	20
15–22 Dec 2021	Opinium	Daily Record	1,328	48%	17%	22%	7%	3%	–	4%	26
18–22 Nov 2021	YouGov	The Times	1,060	48%	20%	18%	6%	3%	2%	2%	28
9–12 Nov 2021	Panelbase	The Sunday Times	1,000~	48%	21%	20%	7%	–	–	4%	27
20–26 Oct 2021	Panelbase	Scot Goes Pop	1,001	48%	21%	21%	7%	–	–	4%	27
6–10 Sep 2021	Panelbase	The Sunday Times	2,003	47%	23%	19%	7%	–	–	4%	24
2–8 Sep 2021	Opinium	Sky News	1,014	51%	21%	17%	5%	2%	–	3%	30
20 Aug 2021	Alex Cole-Hamilton becomes leader of the Scottish Liberal Democrats										
16–24 Jun 2021	Panelbase	The Sunday Times	1,287	47%	25%	18%	6%	–	–	4%	22
13 May 2021	Airdrie and Shotts by-election										
6 May 2021	Election to the Scottish Parliament										
2–4 May 2021	YouGov	The Times	1,144	48%	22%	19%	5%	4%	1%	2%	26
30 Apr – 4 May 2021	Survation	DC Thomson	1,008	48%	22%	20%	7%	1%	–	1%	26
28 Apr – 3 May 2021	Opinium	Sky News	1,015	47%	25%	20%	6%	1%	–	1%	22
27–30 Apr 2021	BMG	The Herald	1,023	48%	20%	20%	7%	3%	–	1%	28
23–26 Apr 2021	Survation	Good Morning Britain	1,008	46%	22%	22%	8%	–	–	2%	24
21–26 Apr 2021	Panelbase	Scot Goes Pop	1,075	45%	22%	19%	7%	4%	–	3%	23
20–22 Apr 2021	Survation	DC Thomson	1,037	47%	21%	22%	8%	1%	–	1%	25
16–20 Apr 2021	YouGov	The Times	1,204	48%	24%	19%	4%	3%	1%	2%	24
1–6 Apr 2021	Opinium	Sky News	1,023	50%	24%	19%	4%	1%	–	1%	26
29–30 Mar 2021	Survation	The Courier	1,021	49%	21%	21%	8%	1%	–	0%	28
19–22 Mar 2021	YouGov	The Times	TBA	49%	24%	17%	4%	4%	1%	1%	25
16–19 Mar 2021	BMG	The Herald	1,021	47%	21%	19%	7%	3%	–	3%	26
11–18 Mar 2021	Survation	The Courier	1,452	49%	21%	21%	7%	1%	–	1%	28
11–16 Mar 2021	Opinium	Sky News	1,096	50%	23%	19%	5%	3%	–	1%	27
4–8 Mar 2021	YouGov	The Times	1,100	50%	23%	17%	5%	3%	1%	1%	27
27 Feb 2021	Anas Sarwar is elected leader of Scottish Labour										
25–26 Feb 2021	Survation	Daily Record	1,011	48%	23%	21%	6%	–	–	2%	25
11–13 Jan 2021	Survation	Scot Goes Pop	1,020	48%	19%	23%	7%	–	–	3%	25
4–9 Dec 2020	Survation	N/A	1,009	51%	20%	21%	6%	3%	–	–	30
5–11 Nov 2020	Panelbase	Scot Goes Pop	1,020	50%	21%	20%	5%	2%	–	–	29
6–10 Nov 2020	YouGov	The Times	1,089	53%	19%	17%	4%	3%	3%	1%	34
28 Oct – 4 Nov 2020	Survation	N/A	1,059	52%	18%	20%	8%	–	–	2%	32
17–21 Sep 2020	JL Partners	Politico	1,016	56%	18%	15%	7%	3%	–	0%	38
2–7 Sep 2020	Survation	N/A	1,018	51%	20%	21%	6%	–	–	3%	30
6–10 Aug 2020	YouGov	The Times	1,142	54%	20%	16%	5%	2%	2%	0%	34
5 Aug 2020	Douglas Ross becomes leader of the Scottish Conservatives										
30 Jun – 3 Jul 2020	Panelbase	The Sunday Times	1,026	53%	21%	19%	6%	–	–	2%	32
1–5 Jun 2020	Panelbase	Scot Goes Pop	1,022	51%	21%	19%	6%	2%	–	1%	30
1–5 May 2020	Panelbase	Wings Over Scotland	1,086	50%	26%	17%	5%	2%	–	1%	24
24–27 Apr 2020	YouGov	N/A	1,095	51%	25%	15%	6%	2%	0%	1%	26
24–26 Mar 2020	Panelbase	The Sunday Times	1,023	48%	27%	16%	5%	3%	–	–	21
14 Feb 2020	Jackson Carlaw becomes leader of the Scottish Conservatives										
12 Dec 2019	2019 general election		–	45.0%	25.1%	18.6%	9.5%	1.0%	0.5%	0.3%	19.9

== Boundary review ==
2024 map of Scottish constituencies

In March 2020, Cabinet Office minister Chloe Smith confirmed that the 2023 Periodic Review of Westminster constituencies would be based on retaining 650 seats. The previous relevant legislation was amended by the Parliamentary Constituencies Act 2020 and the four boundary commissions formally launched their 2023 reviews on 5 January 2021. They were required to issue their final reports prior to 1 July 2023. The Scottish commission published its own report on 28 June. As the reports were laid before Parliament, Orders in Council giving effect to the final proposals must be made within four months, unless "there are exceptional circumstances". Prior to the Parliamentary Constituencies Act 2020, boundary changes could not be implemented until they were approved by both Houses of Parliament.

Fifty-seven single member constituencies were used in Scotland for this election, a reduction of two since 2019. A number of constituencies are unchanged, including the two protected constituencies of Na h-Eileanan an Iar covering the Western Isles, and Orkney and Shetland, covering the Northern Isles.

== Candidates ==
=== By affiliation ===
Affiliate	Candidates
Conservative and Unionist Party	57
Labour Party	57
Liberal Democrats	57
Reform UK	57
Scottish National Party	57
Scottish Greens	44
Independents	25 (21 constituencies)
Alba Party	19
Scottish Family Party	16
Co-operative Party	4 (Note: In electoral pact with the Labour Party, all candidates are also standing for the Labour Party)
Scottish Libertarian Party	4
Trade Unionist and Socialist Coalition	4
Communist Party of Britain	3
Socialist Labour Party	3
UKIP	3
British Unionist Party	2
Christian Party	2
Independence for Scotland Party	2
Scottish Socialist Party	2
Social Democratic Party	2
Sovereignty	2
Workers Party of Britain	2
Freedom Alliance (UK)	1
Heritage Party	1
Liberal Party	1
Socialist Equality Party	1
Total	424

=== By constituency ===
Bold meant the candidate was elected.

Constituency	Conservative	Labour	Liberal Democrats	Reform UK	Scottish Greens	SNP	Others	Incumbent	
Aberdeen North	Gillian Tebberen	Lynn Thomson	Desmond Bouse	Kenneth Leggat	Esme Houston	Kirsty Blackman	Charlie Abel (Alba); Lucas Grant (TUSC); Neil Healy (Workers); Dawn Smith (Scottish Family)	SNP	Kirsty Blackman
Aberdeen South	John Wheeler	Tauqeer Malik	Jeff Goodhall	Michael Pearce	Guy Ingerson	Stephen Flynn	Graeme Craib (Scottish Family); Sophie Molly (Independent)	SNP	Stephen Flynn
Aberdeenshire North and Moray East	Douglas Ross	Andrew Brown	Ian Bailey	Jo Hart		Seamus Logan		Conservative	David Duguid (Banff and Buchan)
Airdrie and Shotts	Alexandra Herdman	Kenneth Stevenson	Lewis Younie	David Hall		Anum Qaisar	John Jo Leckie (British Unionist); Josh Robertson (Alba)	SNP	Anum Qaisar (Note: Elected in a by-election)
Alloa and Grangemouth	Rachel Nunn	Brian Leishman	Adrian May	Richard Fairley	Nariese Whyte	John Nicolson	Eva Comrie (Independent); Tom Flanagan (Workers); Kenny MacAskill (Alba)	SNP	John Nicolson (Ochil and South Perthshire)
Angus and Perthshire Glens	Stephen Kerr (Note: MP for Stirling (2017–2019) and MSP for Central Scotland (since 2021))	Elizabeth Carr-Ellis	Claire McLaren	Kenneth Morton		Dave Doogan	Dan Peña (Independent)	SNP	Dave Doogan (Angus)
Arbroath and Broughty Ferry	Richard Brooks	Cheryl-Ann Cruickshank	David Evans	Gwen Wood		Stephen Gethins (Note: MP for North East Fife from 2015 to 2019)	Moira Brown (Sovereignty); Ghazi Khan (Alba)	SNP	Stewart Hosie (Dundee East)
Argyll, Bute and South Lochaber	Amanda Hampsey	Hamish Maxwell	Alan Reid (Note: MP for Argyll and Bute (2001–2015))	Melanie Hurst		Brendan O'Hara	Tommy Macpherson (Independent)	SNP	Brendan O'Hara (Argyll and Bute)
Ayr, Carrick and Cumnock	Martin Dowey	Elaine Stewart	Paul Kennedy	Andrew Russell	Korin Vallance	Allan Dorans	Corri Wilson (Alba)	SNP	Allan Dorans
Bathgate and Linlithgow	Lynn Munro	Kirsteen Sullivan	Sally Pattle	Jamie McNamee	Simon Jay	Martyn Day	John Hannah (ISP); Stuart McArthur (Independent)	SNP	Martyn Day (Linlithgow and East Falkirk)
Berwickshire, Roxburgh and Selkirk	John Lamont	Caitlin Stott	Ray Georgeson	Carolyn Grant	Neil MacKinnon	David Wilson	Hamish Goldie-Scot (Scottish Family); Ellie Merton (Independent)	Conservative	John Lamont
Caithness, Sutherland and Easter Ross	Fiona Fawcett	Eva Kestner	Jamie Stone	Sandra Skinner	Anne Thomas	Lucy Beattie	Steve Chisholm (Alba)	Liberal Democrats	Jamie Stone
Central Ayrshire	David Rocks	Alan Gemmell	Elaine Ford	Stevie Bates	Tom Kerr	Annie McIndoe	Allan MacMillan (SDP); Louise McDaid (Socialist Labour)	SNP	Philippa Whitford
Coatbridge and Bellshill	Christina Sandhu	Frank McNally	Emma Farthing	Fiona McRae	Patrick McAleer	Steven Bonnar	Drew Gilchrist (CPB); Leo Lanahan (Scottish Family)	SNP	Steven Bonnar (Coatbridge, Chryston and Bellshill)
Cowdenbeath and Kirkcaldy	Johnathan Gray	Melanie Ward	Fraser Graham	Sonia Davidson	Mags Hall	Lesley Backhouse	Neale Hanvey (Alba); Calum Paul (Libertarian)	Alba (elected as SNP)	Neale Hanvey (Kirkcaldy and Cowdenbeath)
Cumbernauld and Kirkintilloch	Satbir Gill	Katrina Murray	Adam Harley	Billy Ross	Anne McCrossan	Stuart McDonald		SNP	Stuart McDonald (Cumbernauld, Kilsyth and Kirkintilloch East)
Dumfries and Galloway	John Cooper	James Wallace	Iain McDonald	Charles Anthony Keal	Laura Moodie	Tracey Little	David Griffiths (Heritage)	Conservative	Alister Jack
Dumfriesshire, Clydesdale and Tweeddale	David Mundell	Daniel Coleman	Drummond Begg	David Kirkwood	Dominic Ashmole	Kim Marshall	Gareth Kirk (Scottish Family)	Conservative	David Mundell
Dundee Central	Emma Farquhar	Richard McCready	Daniel Coleman	Vicky McCann		Chris Law	Susan Ettle (Scottish Family); Jim McFarlane (TUSC); Raymond Mennie (Workers); Niko Omilana (Independent); Alan Ross (Alba)	SNP	Chris Law (Dundee West)
Dunfermline and Dollar	Thomas Heald	Graeme Downie	Lauren Buchanan-Quigley	Udo van den Brock	Ryan Blackadder	Naz Anis Miah	Graham Hadley (Independent); George Morton (Independent); Danny Smith (Scottish Family)	SNP	Douglas Chapman (Dunfermline and West Fife)
East Kilbride and Strathaven	Ross Lambie	Joani Reid	Aisha Mir	David Mills	Ann McGuinness	Grant Costello	Donald Mackay (UKIP); David Richardson (Scottish Family)	Conservative (elected as SNP)	Lisa Cameron (Note: Elected for the SNP, joined the Conservatives in 2023) (East Kilbride, Strathaven and Lesmahagow)
East Renfrewshire	Sandesh Gulhane (Note: MSP for Glasgow since 2021)	Blair McDougall	Alan Grant	Matt Alexander	Karen Sharkey	Kirsten Oswald	Maria Reid (Scottish Family); Allan Steele (Liberal); Colette Walker (ISP)	SNP	Kirsten Oswald
Edinburgh East and Musselburgh	Marie-Clair Munro	Chris Murray	Charles Dundas	Derek Winton	Amanda Grimm	Tommy Sheppard	Jane Gould (Independent)	SNP	Tommy Sheppard (Edinburgh East)
Edinburgh North and Leith	Joanna Mowat	Tracy Gilbert	Mike Andersen	Alan Melville	Kayleigh O'Neill	Deidre Brock	Niel Deepnarain (Scottish Family); David Jacobsen (Socialist Labour); Richard Shillcock (CPB); Caroline Waterloo (Independent)	SNP	Deidre Brock
Edinburgh South	Christopher Cowdy	Ian Murray	Andy Williamson	Cameron Rose	Jo Phillips	Simita Kumar	Phil Holden (Scottish Family); Lynne Lyon (Alba); Alex Martin (Independent); Mark Rowbotham (Independent)	Labour	Ian Murray
Edinburgh South West	Sue Webber	Scott Arthur	Bruce Wilson	Ian Harper	Dan Heap	Joanna Cherry	Richard Lucas (Scottish Family); Marc Wilkinson (Independent)	SNP	Joanna Cherry
Edinburgh West	Alastair Shields	Michael Davidson	Christine Jardine	Otto Inglis	James Puchowski	Euan Hyslop	David Henry (Independent); Nick Hornig (Independent); Tam Laird (Scottish Libertarian)	Liberal Democrats	Christine Jardine
Falkirk	James Bundy	Euan Stainbank	Tim McKay	Keith Barrow	Rachel Kidd	Toni Giugliano	Zohaib Arshad (Alba); Mark Tunnicliff (Independent)	SNP	John McNally
Glasgow East	Thomas Kerr	John Grady	Matthew Clark	Donnie McLeod	Amy Kettyles	David Linden	Liam McLaughlan (SSP)	SNP	David Linden
Glasgow North	Naveed Asghar	Martin Rhodes	Daniel O'Malley	Helen Burns	Iris Duane	Alison Thewliss	Nick Durie (Alba)	SNP	Patrick Grady
Glasgow North	Naveed Asghar	Martin Rhodes	Daniel O'Malley	Helen Burns	Iris Duane	Alison Thewliss	Nick Durie (Alba)	SNP	Alison Thewliss (Glasgow Central)
Glasgow North East	Robert Connelly	Maureen Burke	Sheila Thomson	Jonathan Walmsley	Ewan Lewis	Anne McLaughlin	Catherine McKernan (Alba); Robert Scott (SDP); Chris Sermanni (TUSC); Gary Steele (CPB)	SNP	Anne McLaughlin
Glasgow West	Faten Hameed	Patricia Ferguson (Note: Member of the Scottish Parliament for Glasgow Maryhill and Springburn (2011–2016) and Glasgow Maryhill (1999–2011))	James Calder	Dionne Moore	Nick Quail	Carol Monaghan	John Cormack (Christian)	SNP	Carol Monaghan (Glasgow North West)
Glasgow South	Haroun Malik	Gordon McKee	Peter McLaughlin	Danny Raja	Niall Christie	Stewart McDonald	Dhruva Kumar (Alba); Brian Smith (TUSC)	SNP	Stewart McDonald
Glasgow South West	Mamun Rashid	Zubir Ahmed	Paul McGarry	Morag McRae	John Hamelink	Chris Stephens	Tony Osy (Alba)	SNP	Chris Stephens
Glenrothes and Mid Fife	Debbie MacCallum	Richard Baker	Jill Reilly	Ian Smith		John Beare		SNP	Peter Grant (Glenrothes)
Gordon and Buchan	Harriet Cross	Nurul Hoque Ali	Conrad Wood	Kris Callander		Richard Thomson		SNP	Richard Thomson (Gordon)
Hamilton and Clyde Valley	Richard Nelson	Imogen Walker	Kyle Burns	Lisa Judge		Ross Clark	Christopher Ho (UKIP)	SNP	Angela Crawley (Lanark and Hamilton East)
Inverclyde and Renfrewshire West	Ted Runciman	Martin McCluskey	Ross Stalker	Simon Moorehead	Iain Hamilton	Ronnie Cowan	John Burleigh (Independent); Christopher McEleny (Alba)	SNP	Ronnie Cowan (Inverclyde)
Inverness, Skye and West Ross-shire	Ruraidh Stewart	Michael Perera	Angus MacDonald	Dillan Hill	Peter Newman	Drew Hendry	Darren Paxton (Socialist Equality)	SNP	Drew Hendry (Inverness, Nairn, Badenoch and Strathspey)
Inverness, Skye and West Ross-shire	Ruraidh Stewart	Michael Perera	Angus MacDonald	Dillan Hill	Peter Newman	Drew Hendry	Darren Paxton (Socialist Equality)	SNP	Ian Blackford (Ross, Skye and Lochaber)
Kilmarnock and Loudoun	Jordan Cowie	Lillian Jones	Edward Thornley	William Thomson	Bex Glen	Alan Brown	Stephen McNamara (Independent)	SNP	Alan Brown
Livingston	Damien Doran-Timson	Gregor Poynton	Caron Lindsay	David McLennan	Cameron Glasgow	Hannah Bardell	Debbie Ewan (Alba)	SNP	Hannah Bardell
Lothian East	Scott Hamilton	Douglas Alexander (Note: MP for Paisley and Renfrewshire South (2005–2015) and Paisley South (1997–2005 and is also running under a joint ticket with the Co-operative Party))	Duncan Dunlop	Robert Davies	Shona McIntosh	Lyn Jardine	George Kerevan (Alba)	Alba (elected as SNP)	Kenny MacAskill (East Lothian)
Mid Dunbartonshire	Alix Mathieson	Lorna Dougall	Susan Murray	David McNabb	Carolynn Scrimgeour	Amy Callaghan	Ray James (Alba)	SNP	Amy Callaghan (East Dunbartonshire)
Midlothian	Keith Cockburn	Kirsty McNeill	Ross Laird	Stefan Garbowski		Owen Thompson	Daniel Fraser (Scottish Libertarian)	SNP	Owen Thompson
Moray West, Nairn and Strathspey	Kathleen Robertson	James Hynam	Neil Alexander	Steve Skerrett	Draeyk Van Der Horn	Graham Leadbitter	Euan Morrice (Scottish Family)	Conservative	Douglas Ross (Moray)
Motherwell, Wishaw and Carluke	Oyebola Ajala	Pamela Nash (Note: Member of Parliament for Airdrie and Shotts from 2010 to 2015)	Haley Bennie	Robert MacLaughlan	Gordon Miller	Marion Fellows	Gus Ferguson (British Unionist); Ross Hagen (Scottish Libertarian); Neil Wilson (UKIP)	SNP	Marion Fellows (Motherwell and Wishaw)
Na h-Eileanan an Iar	Kenny Barker	Torcuil Crichton	Jamie Dobson	Tony Ridden		Susan Thomson	Donald Boyd (Christian); Angus MacNeil (Independent); Steven Welsh (Scottish Family)	Independent (elected as SNP)	Angus MacNeil
North Ayrshire and Arran	Todd Ferguson	Irene Campbell	Gillian Cole-Hamilton	Michael Mann	Cara McKee	Patricia Gibson	Ian Gibson (SDP); James McDaid (Socialist Labour)	SNP	Patricia Gibson
North East Fife	Bill Bowman (Note: Member of the Scottish Parliament for North East Scotland from 2016 to 2021)	Jennifer Gallagher	Wendy Chamberlain	Matthew Wren	Morven Ovenstone-Jones	Stefan Hoggan-Radu		Liberal Democrats	Wendy Chamberlain
Orkney and Shetland	Shane Painter	Conor Savage	Alistair Carmichael	Robert Smith	Alex Armitage	Robert Leslie		Liberal Democrats	Alistair Carmichael
Paisley and Renfrewshire North	David McGonigle	Alison Taylor	Grant Toghill	Andrew Scott	Jen Bell	Gavin Newlands		SNP	Gavin Newlands
Paisley and Renfrewshire South	Alec Leishman	Johanna Baxter	Jack Clark	Jim McIlroy	Athol Bond	Jacqueline Cameron	Paul Mack (Independent); Mark Turnbill (Freedom Alliance)	SNP	Mhairi Black
Perth and Kinross-shire	Luke Graham (Note: MP for Ochil and South Perthshire from 2017 to 2019)	Graham Cox	Amanda Clark	Helen McDade		Pete Wishart	Sally Hughes (Independent)	SNP	Pete Wishart (Perth and North Perthshire)
Rutherglen	Gary Burns	Michael Shanks	Gloria Adebo	David Stark		Katy Loudon	Bill Bonnar (SSP); Andrew Daly (Independent); Jim Eadie (Alba); John McArthur (Scottish Family)	Labour	Michael Shanks (Note: Elected in a by-election) (Rutherglen and Hamilton West)
Stirling and Strathallan	Neil Benny	Chris Kane	Hamish Taylor	Bill McDonald	Andrew Adam	Alyn Smith		SNP	Alyn Smith (Stirling)
West Aberdeenshire and Kincardine	Andrew Bowie	Kate Blake	Michael Turvey	Brandon Innes	William Linegar	Glen Reynolds	Irish Leask (Independent); David Neill (Independent)	Conservative	Andrew Bowie
West Dunbartonshire	Maurice Corry	Douglas McAllister	Paul Donald Kennedy	David Smith	Paula Baker	Martin Docherty-Hughes	Andrew Muir (Scottish Family); Kelly Wilson (Sovereignty)	SNP	Martin Docherty-Hughes

== MPs not seeking re-election ==
Members of Parliament not standing for re-election
MP	Constituency	First elected	Affiliation	Date announced	Note
Alister Jack	Dumfries and Galloway	2017	Conservative	17 May 2023	Current Scottish Secretary
Ian Blackford	Ross, Skye and Lochaber	2015	SNP	6 June 2023	Former leader of SNP Westminster group
Peter Grant	Glenrothes	2015	SNP	21 June 2023	
Angela Crawley	Lanark and Hamilton East	2015	SNP	23 June 2023	Former SNP shadow Attorney General
Douglas Chapman	Dunfermline and West Fife	2015	SNP	26 June 2023	
Stewart Hosie	Dundee East	2005	SNP	28 June 2023	Current SNP shadow Chancellor
Mhairi Black	Paisley and Renfrewshire South	2015	SNP	4 July 2023	Current deputy leader of SNP Westminster group
John McNally	Falkirk	2015	SNP	10 July 2023	
Philippa Whitford	Central Ayrshire	2015	SNP	18 July 2023	Current SNP Spokesperson for Scotland
Lisa Cameron	East Kilbride, Strathaven and Lesmahagow	2015	Conservative	17 October 2023	Elected from SNP

== Results ==
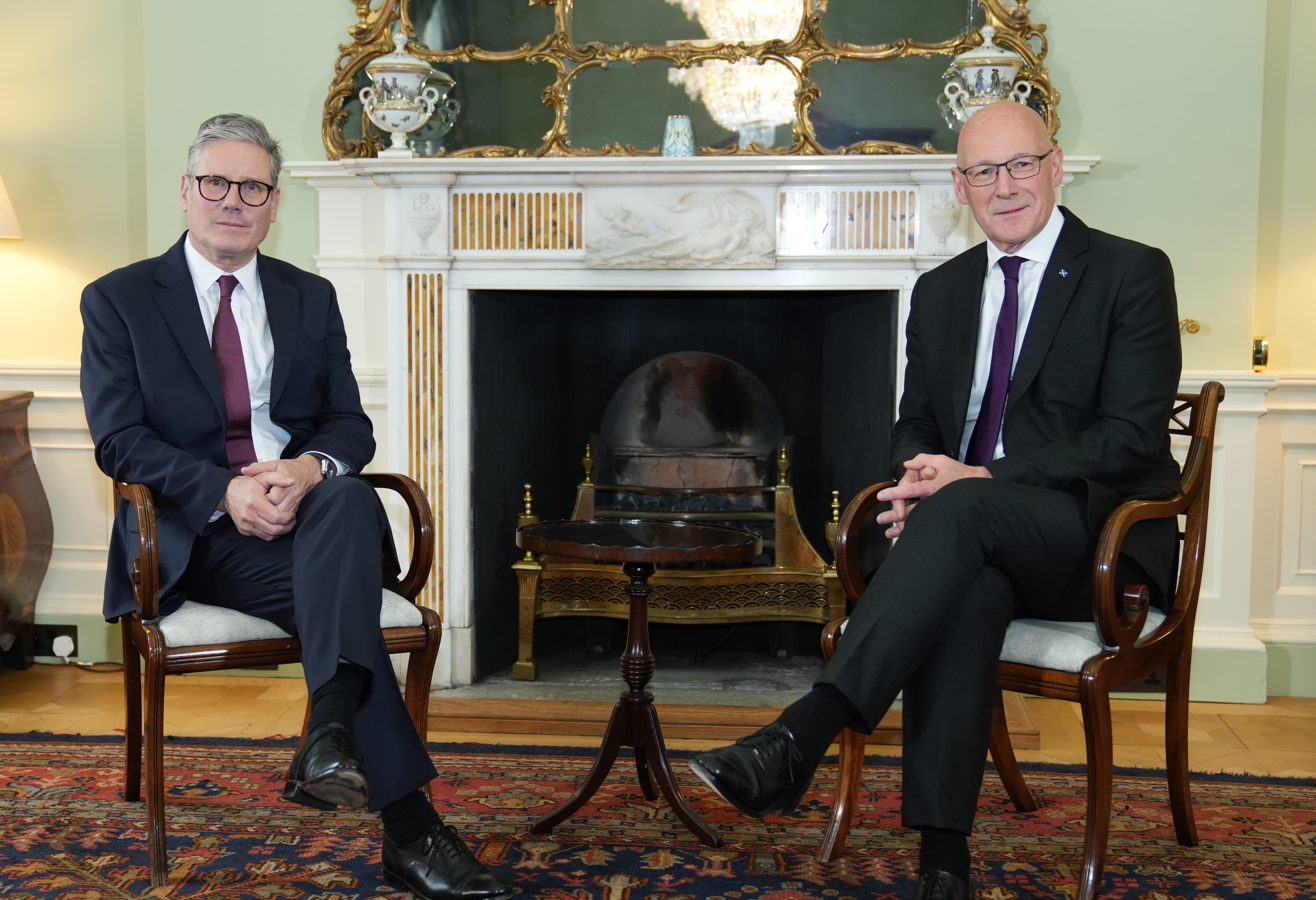
Swinney meets with Prime Minister of the United Kingdom, Keir Starmer, following the 2024 general election at Bute House

The SNP ultimately won nine seats in the 2024 election, a loss of 38 seats on its 2019 result, reducing it to the second-largest party in Scotland, behind Scottish Labour, and the fourth-largest party in Westminster. Swinney took full responsibility but said that he would not resign as leader. He said of the results, "There will have to be a lot of soul searching as a party as a consequence of these results that have come in tonight", and that the SNP has to be "better at governing on behalf of the people of Scotland", admitting the party was not "winning the argument" on Scottish independence.

On 7 July 2024, newly elected Prime Minister of the United Kingdom Keir Starmer travelled to Edinburgh on the first stop of his tour of the four countries of the United Kingdom and met with Swinney at the official residence of the First Minister, Bute House. During the meeting, both Swinney and Starmer agreed to "work together" and to "reset the relationship between their two governments".

== Results detail ==
Voting closed at 22:00, which was followed by an exit poll. The first seat, Houghton and Sunderland South, declared at 23:15 with Bridget Phillipson winning for Labour. Inverness, Skye and West Ross-shire was the last seat to declare, after a recount took place on Saturday 6 July.

=== By affiliation ===
Affiliate	Seats					Aggregate votes		
Affiliate	Total	Gains	Losses	Net	Of all (%)	Total	Of all (%)	Difference
Labour	37	36	0	▲36	64.9	851,897	35.3	▲16.7
SNP	9	1	40	▼39	15.8	724,758	30.0	▼15.0
Conservative	5	0	1	▼1	8.8	307,344	12.7	▼12.4
Liberal Democrats	6	4	0	▲4	10.5	234,228	9.7	▲0.2
Reform	0	0	0	Steady	—	167,979	7.0	▲6.5
Green	0	0	0	Steady	—	92,685	3.8	▲2.8
Alba	0	New			—	11,784	0.5	New
Independent	0	0	0	Steady	—	9,782	0.4	▲0.3
Scottish Family	0	0	0	Steady	—	5,425	0.2	▲0.2
TUSC	0	Did not stand in 2019			—	1,523	0.1	—N/a
Scottish Socialist	0	Did not stand in 2019			—	1,007	0.0	—N/a
Scottish Christian	0	Coalition with CPA in 2019			—	806	0.0	—N/a
Socialist Labour	0	0	0	Steady	—	788	0.0	
ISP	0	New			—	678	0.0	New
BUP	0	Did not stand in 2019			—	614	0.0	—N/a
Scottish Libertarian	0	0	0	Steady	—	536	0.0	Steady
Communist	0	Did not stand in 2019			—	516	0.0	—N/a
Liberal	0	0	0	Steady	—	481	0.0	
SDP	0	0	0	Steady	—	426	0.0	Steady
Workers Party	0	New			—	415	0.0	New
UKIP	0	0	0	Steady	—	313	0.0	▼0.1
Sovereignty	0	New			—	304	0.0	New
Heritage	0	New			—	230	0.0	New
Socialist Equality	0	0	0	Steady	—	178	0.0	
Freedom Alliance	0	New			—	113	0.0	New
Total	57					2,414,810	59.2	▼8.4

2024 map of Scottish Constituencies – Results

=== By constituency ===
Constituency	2019 seat	2024 seat					Votes								Turnout
Constituency	2019 seat	Party	Candidate	Votes	Share	Majority	Lab.	SNP	Con.	Lib. Dems	Ref.	Green	Other	Total	Turnout
Aberdeen North	SNP	SNP	Kirsty Blackman	14,552	34.5%	1,779	12,773	14,552	5,881	2,583	3,781	1,275	1,269	42,114	55.4%
Aberdeen South	SNP	SNP	Stephen Flynn	15,213	32.8%	3,758	11,455	15,213	11,300	2,921	3,199	1,609	648	46,345	59.9%
Aberdeenshire North and Moray East	Con	SNP	Seamus Logan	13,455	35.2%	942	3,876	13,455	12,513	2,782	5,562	—N/a	—N/a	38,188	54.5%
Airdrie and Shotts	SNP	Lab	Kenneth Stevenson	18,871	51.5%	7,547	18,871	11,324	1,696	725	2,971	—N/a	1,079	36,666	52.2%
Alloa and Grangemouth	SNP	Lab	Brian Leishman	18,039	43.8%	6,122	18,039	11,917	3,127	1,151	3,804	1,421	1,742	41,201	58.3%
Angus and Perthshire Glens	SNP	SNP	Dave Doogan	19,142	40.4%	4,870	6,799	19,142	14,272	3,156	3,246	—N/a	733	47,348	61.8%
Arbroath and Broughty Ferry	SNP	SNP	Stephen Gethins	15,581	35.3%	859	14,722	15,581	6,841	2,249	3,800	—N/a	924	44,117	57.9%
Argyll, Bute and South Lochaber	SNP	SNP	Brendan O'Hara	15,582	34.7%	6,232	8,585	15,582	9,350	7,359	3,045	—N/a	941	45,078	62.5%
Ayr, Carrick and Cumnock	SNP	Lab	Elaine Stewart	14,930	36.5%	4,154	14,930	10,776	9,247	1,081	3,544	886	472	40,936	58.2%
Bathgate and Linlithgow	SNP	Lab	Kirsteen Sullivan	19,774	47.0%	8,323	19,774	11,451	3,144	2,171	3,524	1,390	611	42,065	58.3%
Berwickshire, Roxburgh and Selkirk	Con	Con	John Lamont	18,872	40.5%	6,599	6,311	12,273	18,872	3,686	3,340	1,526	550	46,558	60.9%
Caithness, Sutherland and Easter Ross	LD	LD	Jamie Stone	22,736	49.4%	10,489	3,409	12,247	1,860	22,736	3,360	1,641	795	46,170	61.8%
Central Ayrshire	SNP	Lab	Alan Gemmell	18,091	43.7%	6,869	18,091	11,222	6,147	983	3,420	1,039	517	41,419	59.7%
Coatbridge and Bellshill	SNP	Lab	Frank McNally	19,291	49.8%	6,344	19,291	12,947	1,382	671	2,601	1,229	610	38,731	53.3%
Cowdenbeath and Kirkcaldy	SNP	Lab	Melanie Ward	18,662	45.7%	7,248	18,662	11,414	3,203	1,593	3,128	1,556	1,258	40,814	56.8%
Cumbernauld and Kirkintilloch	SNP	Lab	Katrina Murray	18,513	45.2%	4,144	18,513	14,369	1,939	1,294	3,167	1,694	—N/a	40,976	58.2%
Dumfries and Galloway	Con	Con	John Cooper	13,527	29.6%	930	11,767	12,597	13,527	2,092	4,313	1,249	230	45,775	58.3%
Dumfriesshire, Clydesdale and Tweeddale	Con	Con	David Mundell	14,999	33.9%	4,242	10,140	10,757	14,999	2,800	3,822	1,448	208	44,174	61.5%
Dundee Central	SNP	SNP	Chris Law	15,544	40.0%	675	14,869	15,544	1,569	2,402	2,363	—N/a	2,101	38,848	52.3%
Dunfermline and Dollar	SNP	Lab	Graeme Downie	20,336	45.7%	8,241	20,336	12,095	3,297	3,181	2,887	2,078	663	44,537	61.2%
East Kilbride and Strathaven	SNP	Lab	Joani Reid	22,682	48.6%	9,057	22,682	13,625	3,547	1,074	3,377	1,811	591	46,707	61.1%
East Renfrewshire	SNP	Lab	Blair McDougall	21,935	43.7%	8,421	21,935	13,514	8,494	1,150	2,360	1,510	1,364	50,227	67.3%
Edinburgh East and Musselburgh	SNP	Lab	Chris Murray	18,790	41.2%	3,715	18,790	15,075	2,598	1,949	2,129	4,669	365	45,575	59.8%
Edinburgh North and Leith	SNP	Lab	Tracy Gilbert	20,805	42.1%	7,268	20,805	13,537	3,254	3,879	1,818	5,417	765	49,418	63.1%
Edinburgh South	Lab	Lab	Ian Murray	24,976	53.3%	17,251	24,976	7,725	4,001	2,746	1,845	4,270	1,263	46,826	66.1%
Edinburgh South West	SNP	Lab	Scott Arthur	18,663	40.9%	6,217	18,663	12,446	5,558	3,014	2,087	3,450	446	45,664	61.9%
Edinburgh West	LD	LD	Christine Jardine	26,645	50.8%	16,470	7,854	10,175	2,897	26,645	2,209	2,100	591	52,471	68.6%
Falkirk	SNP	Lab	Euan Stainbank	18,343	43.0%	4,996	18,343	13,347	3,576	1,092	3,375	1,711	1,181	42,625	57.9%
Glasgow East	SNP	Lab	John Grady	15,543	43.8%	3,784	15,543	11,759	1,707	872	2,371	2,727	466	35,445	51.4%
Glasgow North	SNP	Lab	Martin Rhodes	14,655	42.2%	3,539	14,655	11,116	1,366	1,142	1,655	4,233	572	34,739	51.4%
Glasgow North East	SNP	Lab	Maureen Burke	15,639	45.9%	4,637	15,639	11,002	1,182	592	2,272	2,471	933	34,091	47.0%
Glasgow South	SNP	Lab	Gordon McKee	17,696	41.8%	4,154	17,696	13,542	1,617	1,316	1,736	5,554	917	42,378	60.4%
Glasgow South West	SNP	Lab	Zubir Ahmed	15,552	43.6%	3,285	15,552	12,267	1,387	958	2,236	2,727	542	35,669	51.8%
Glasgow West	SNP	Lab	Patricia Ferguson	18,621	46.7%	6,446	18,621	12,175	1,720	1,316	2,098	3,662	310	39,902	57.8%
Glenrothes and Mid Fife	SNP	Lab	Richard Baker	15,994	44.3%	2,954	15,994	13,040	1,973	1,604	3,528	—N/a	—N/a	36,139	51.1%
Gordon and Buchan	Con	Con	Harriet Cross	14,418	32.9%	878	4,686	13,540	14,418	7,307	3,978	—N/a	—N/a	44,014	63.0%
Hamilton and Clyde Valley	SNP	Lab	Imogen Walker	21,020	49.9%	9,472	21,020	11,548	4,589	1,511	3,299	—N/a	117	42,084	55.8%
Inverclyde and Renfrewshire West	SNP	Lab	Martin McCluskey	18,931	46.9%	6,371	18,931	12,560	2,863	1,259	2,476	1,173	1,088	40,350	57.5%
Inverness, Skye and West Ross-shire	SNP	LD	Angus MacDonald	18,159	37.8%	2,160	6,246	15,999	2,502	18,159	2,034	2,038	178	48,056	61.7%
Kilmarnock and Loudoun	SNP	Lab	Lillian Jones	19,055	44.9%	5,129	19,055	13,936	3,527	850	3,472	1,237	401	42,478	56.9%
Livingston	SNP	Lab	Gregor Poynton	18,324	40.9%	3,528	18,324	14,796	3,469	2,025	3,977	1,704	545	44,840	57.5%
Lothian East	SNP	Lab	Douglas Alexander	23,555	49.2%	13,265	23,555	10,290	5,335	2,649	3,039	2,477	557	47,902	63.7%
Mid Dunbartonshire	SNP	LD	Susan Murray	22,349	42.4%	9,673	10,933	12,676	2,452	22,349	2,099	1,720	449	52,738	71.7%
Midlothian	SNP	Lab	Kirsty McNeill	21,480	48.6%	8,167	21,480	13,313	3,248	2,589	3,276	—N/a	259	44,165	60.0%
Moray West, Nairn and Strathspey	SNP	SNP	Graham Leadbitter	14,961	32.1%	1,001	8,259	14,961	13,960	3,785	3,490	1,676	423	46,554	60.4%
Motherwell, Wishaw and Carluke	SNP	Lab	Pamela Nash	19,168	49.1%	7,085	19,168	12,083	2,415	822	3,004	1,200	334	39,151	54.4%
Na h-Eileanan an Iar	SNP	Lab	Torcuil Crichton	6,692	49.5%	3,836	6,692	2,856	647	382	697	—N/a	2,254	13,528	63.7%
North Ayrshire and Arran	SNP	Lab	Irene Campbell	16,821	39.8%	3,551	16,821	13,270	5,954	1,005	3,415	1,327	470	42,262	58.6%
North East Fife	LD	LD	Wendy Chamberlain	23,384	54.7%	13,479	4,026	9,905	1,666	23,384	2,094	1,653	—N/a	42,728	61.2%
Orkney and Shetland	LD	LD	Alistair Carmichael	11,392	55.1%	7,807	1,493	3,585	586	11,392	1,586	2,046	—N/a	20,688	60.4%
Paisley and Renfrewshire North	SNP	Lab	Alison Taylor	19,561	47.1%	6,333	19,561	13,228	2,659	1,374	3,228	1,469	—N/a	41,519	58.6%
Paisley and Renfrewshire South	SNP	Lab	Johanna Baxter	19,583	47.4%	6,527	19,583	13,056	2,219	1,315	2,956	1,724	430	41,283	57.7%
Perth and Kinross-shire	SNP	SNP	Pete Wishart	18,928	37.8%	4,127	9,018	18,928	14,801	3,681	2,970	—N/a	679	50,077	64.8%
Rutherglen	SNP	Lab	Michael Shanks	21,460	50.5%	8,767	21,460	12,693	2,420	1,714	2,685	—N/a	1,512	42,484	58.5%
Stirling and Strathallan	SNP	Lab	Chris Kane	16,856	33.9%	1,394	16,856	15,462	9,469	2,530	3,145	2,320	—N/a	49,782	65.6%
West Aberdeenshire and Kincardine	Con	Con	Andrew Bowie	17,428	35.6%	3,441	6,397	13,987	17,428	6,342	3,497	1,032	275	48,958	67.1%
West Dunbartonshire	SNP	Lab	Douglas McAllister	19,312	48.8%	6,010	19,312	13,302	1,474	839	2,770	1,496	391	39,584	57.3%
All constituencies							851,897	724,758	307,344	234,228	167,979	92,685	35,919	2,414,810	59.0%
All constituencies							35.3%	30.0%	12.7%	9.7%	7.0%	3.8%	1.5%	100.0%	
All constituencies							Seats								
All constituencies							37	9	5	6	0	0	0	57	
All constituencies							65%	16%	8.8%	11%	0%	0%	0%	100.0%	

== Analysis ==
The Scottish Labour Party gained the majority of seats in Scotland for the first time since 2010, regaining most of the seats lost to the SNP in 2015. Labour gained every seat in Glasgow, all but one seat in Edinburgh, and all but one seat in the Central Belt (both of these exceptions being seats won by the Scottish Liberal Democrats). Labour also gained Na h-Eileanan an Iar for the first time since 2001. Labour was also runner-up in four other constituencies, around Aberdeen and Dundee. Three of the Labour candidates elected were also members of the Co-operative Party, designated as Labour-Co-op, but usually simply counted under the Labour party figure.

The Scottish National Party elected nine MPs, a net loss of thirty-nine compared to 2019. The SNP lost most of their seats gained in 2015, including every seat in Glasgow, Edinburgh and the Central Belt. Most of the remaining SNP seats are large rural constituencies in the Scottish Highlands, along with Aberdeen North, Aberdeen South and Dundee Central, Dundee Central had the lowest majority of any Scottish constituency (675 votes between SNP and Labour). The only SNP gain was Aberdeenshire North and Moray East, the predecessor seat of Banff and Buchan had been previously Conservative. The SNP was the runner-up in every constituency it did not win.

The Scottish Liberal Democrats elected six MPs, gaining Mid Dunbartonshire and Inverness, Skye and West Ross-shire, the predecessor seats had once been held by former Liberal Democrat leaders Jo Swinson and Charles Kennedy respectively. The remaining four seats were defended with significantly increased majorities, and close to or over 50% of the vote. Orkney and Shetland remains the longest continuously held Liberal constituency, since 1950. This is the first time since 2010 that there are more Liberal Democrat MPs in Scotland than Conservatives, although the Conservatives had more votes.

The Scottish Conservatives elected five MPs, losing Aberdeenshire North and Moray East which was a new seat being contested by outgoing MP and leader Douglas Ross. As in the previous election, the Conservatives won in all three border constituencies, with their other two seats being in Aberdeenshire. The Conservatives therefore did proportionally better in Scotland compared to their significant losses in England and Wales, and in contrast to the previous Labour landslide of 1997 when the Conservatives lost every seat in Scotland.

Other parties and independents failed to win any seats. The two Alba Party MPs who had defected from the SNP, Kenny MacAskill and Neale Hanvey lost their seats, as did independent Angus McNeil who also left the SNP.

Unlike in England and Wales, the Scottish Greens and Reform UK were not the runner-up in any constituency, but they both did achieve some significant third places considering that Greens and Reform only won seats in England. The strongest results for the Greens were in the cities of Edinburgh and Glasgow, where Labour took all the SNP seats across the cities. Surprisingly, the Greens even came in third place in Orkney and Shetland, a constituency they had never before contested at a general election before. Reform UK performed strongest in SNP-Conservative areas such as North East Scotland and the Scottish Borders, achieving particularly strong third places in Aberdeenshire in constituencies such as Aberdeenshire North and Moray East. They even achieved third places in traditionally Labour-SNP areas in the Central Belt like Airdrie and Shotts, Glenrothes and Mid Fife, Livingston and Rutherglen. Between the two parties they achieved over 10% of the vote in Scotland (Reform 7% and Greens 4%) but no seats. For this discrimination via the electoral system the two parties were similarly compared in England. Unlike Reform, the Scottish Greens did not stand in every seat nor did they retain most of their election deposits.

== See also ==
- 2024 United Kingdom general election in England
- 2024 United Kingdom general election in Northern Ireland
- 2024 United Kingdom general election in Wales
- List of target seats in the 2024 United Kingdom general election
- List of MPs for constituencies in Scotland (2024–present)
- 2026 Scottish Parliament election
- Opinion polling on Scottish independence
