= Graeme Morrice =

British politician (born 1959)

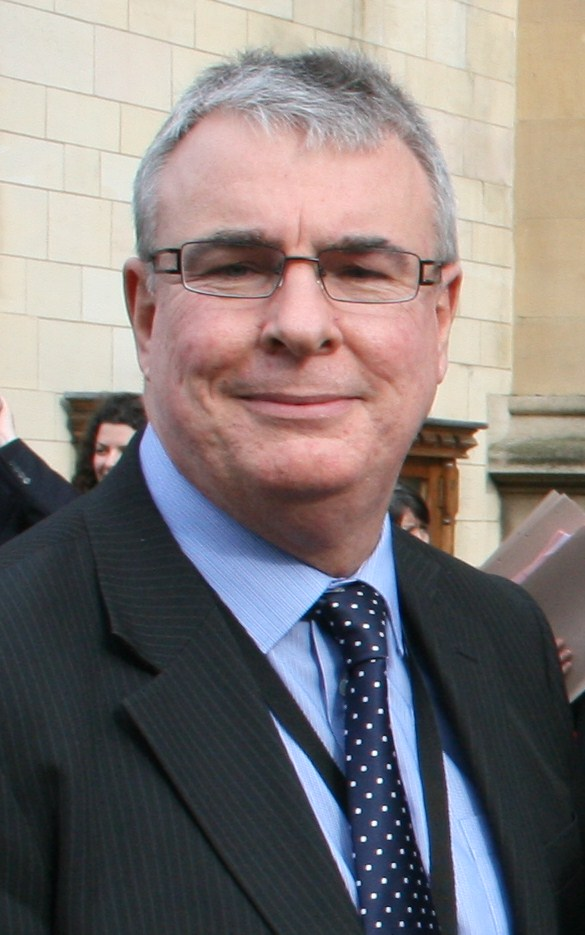

Member of Parliament for Livingston
- In office 6 May 2010 – 30 March 2015
- Preceded by: Jim Devine
- Succeeded by: Hannah Bardell

Leader of West Lothian Council
- In office 1995–2007
- Preceded by: Peter Johnston
- Succeeded by: Peter Johnston

Personal details
- Born: 23 February 1959 (age 67) Edinburgh, Scotland
- Party: Labour
- Education: Edinburgh Napier University
- Website: www.graememorricemp.co.uk

Graeme Morrice (born 23 February 1959) is a Scottish Labour politician who served as the Member of Parliament (MP) for Livingston from 2010 to 2015. Prior to his election to Parliament, he served as the Leader of West Lothian Council from 1995 to 2007.

== Early life and education ==
Edinburgh-born Morrice was educated at the Mauldeth Road Primary School, Parrs Wood High School and Broxburn Academy. He is an alumnus of Edinburgh Napier University, where he was awarded a SHND in Business Studies.

== Political career ==
First elected to West Lothian Council in 1987, Morrice led the council's Labour group from 1992 to 2010. He became leader of the council following the 1995 local elections, when Labour gained control from the SNP, and held the position until the party lost control in 2007.

In June 2009, the incumbent Livingston Labour MP Jim Devine was barred by the party from standing for re-election due to his behaviour in the expenses scandal. Morrice was subsequently selected as Labour's candidate for the 2010 election, and comfortably elected with a majority of 22.6%.

Morrice was the Parliamentary Private Secretary (PPS) to John Denham from 2010 to 2011, then Shadow Secretary of State for Business, Innovation and Skills, and became the PPS to Margaret Curran following her appointment as the Shadow Secretary of State for Scotland. From January 2013 to May 2015, he held a further post as PPS to Harriet Harman, who at that time was both Shadow Deputy Prime Minister and Shadow Secretary of State for Culture, Media and Sport. He was previously a member of the Scottish Affairs Select Committee.

Morrice stood for re-election at the 2015 General Election, but lost the formerly safe seat to the SNP's Hannah Bardell with a swing of 25.9 towards the party.

Parliament of the United Kingdom
| Preceded by Jim Devine | Member of Parliament for Livingston; 2010–2015 | Succeeded by Hannah Bardell |
