= Broxburn Academy =

Location
- Cardross Road; Broxburn, EH52 6AG; Scotland; 55.937°N 3.4885°W

Information
- Type: Secondary school
- Motto: Latin: Sursum Corda; English: Lift up your hearts
- Established: 1962
- Ofsted: Reports
- Head Teacher: Shona Wallace (2024 - present); formerly Peter Reid (2007-2024)
- Gender: Mixed
- Age: 11 to 18
- Enrolment: 900
- Houses: Buchan, Almondell, Strathbrock
- Website: www.broxburnacademy.westlothian.org.uk

Broxburn Academy is a secondary school in Broxburn, West Lothian, Scotland.

== Notable alumni ==
- Hannah Bardell – Scottish National Party MP for Livingston (2015–present)
- Sir Alexander Haddow – Physician and pathologist
- Chris Lilley – Computer scientist
- Graeme Morrice – Former Labour Party MP for Livingston (2010-2015), who was unseated by Bardell at the 2015 UK general election.

== Catchment area ==
Associated Primary Schools: Broxburn Primary, Kirkhill Primary, Uphall Primary, Pumpherston & Uphall Station Community Primary. (Pupils occasionally come from St. Nicholas Roman Catholic Primary and Winchburgh Primary)
