= Hannah Bardell =

Scottish politician (born 1983)

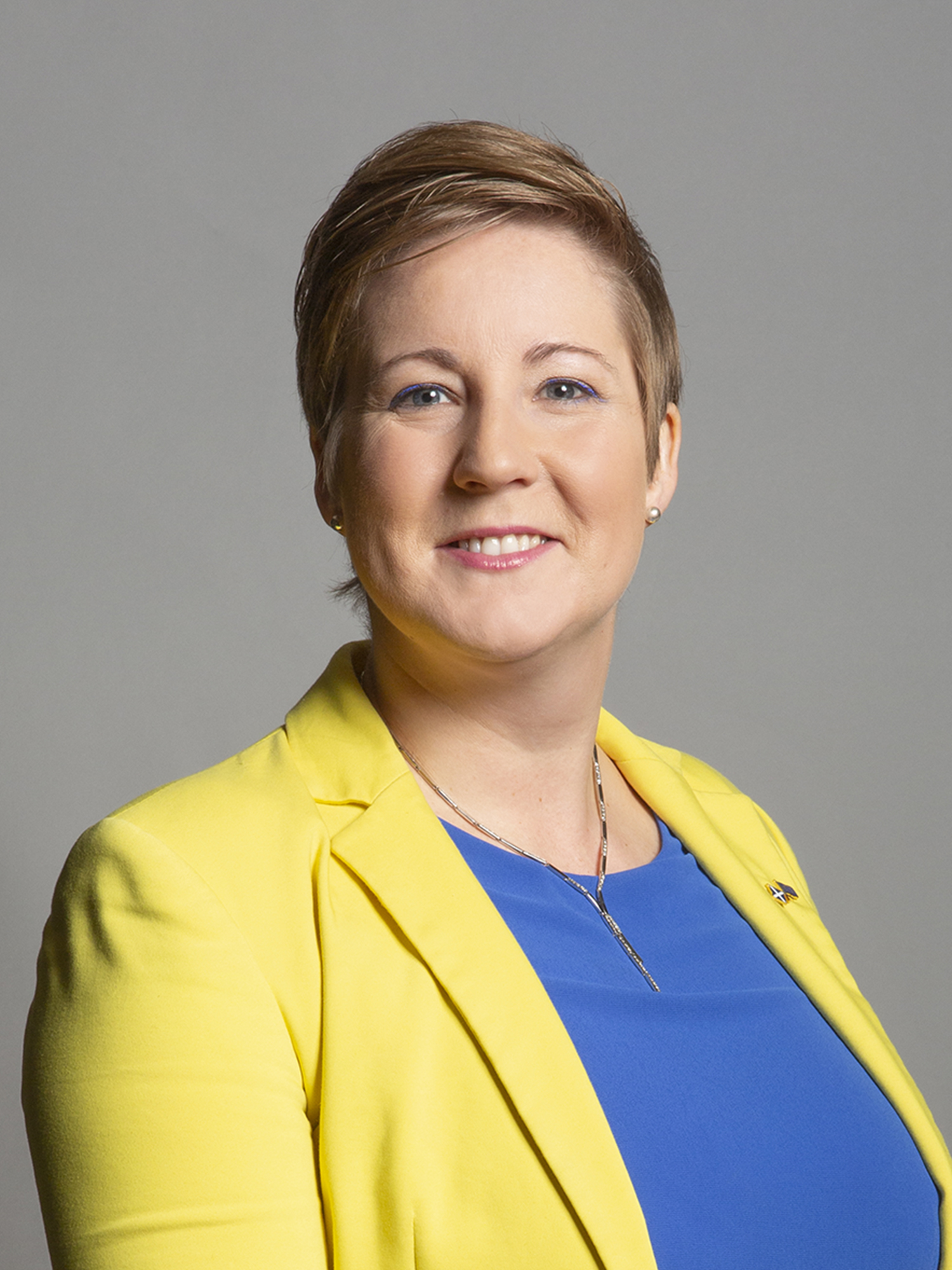
- Official portrait, 2019

SNP Spokesperson for Digital, Culture, Media and Sport in the House of Commons
- In office 17 May 2018 – 6 November 2019
- Leader: Ian Blackford
- Preceded by: Brendan O'Hara
- Succeeded by: John Nicolson

SNP Spokesperson for Work and Pensions in the House of Commons
- In office 20 May 2015 – 30 September 2015
- Leader: Angus Robertson
- Preceded by: Office established
- Succeeded by: Neil Gray

Member of Parliament for Livingston
- In office 7 May 2015 – 30 May 2024
- Preceded by: Graeme Morrice
- Succeeded by: Gregor Poynton

Personal details
- Born: Hannah Mary Bardell; 1 June 1983 (age 42) Livingston, Scotland
- Party: Scottish National Party
- Spouse: Lucienne Kennedy (m. 2024)
- Education: Broxburn Academy
- Alma mater: University of Stirling (BA)

Hannah Mary Kennedy-Bardell (born 1 June 1983) is a Scottish politician who served as Member of Parliament (MP) for Livingston from 2015 until 2024. A member of the Scottish National Party (SNP), she served as its spokesperson for Digital, Culture, Media and Sport from 2018 to 2019.

== Early life and education ==
Bardell was born on 1 June 1983 in Craigshill, Livingston. She is one of two children. Her mother Lis Bardell was the SNP candidate in Livingston in the 2010 general election. She describes herself as coming from a working class, single parent background. She attended Broxburn Academy and the University of Stirling. Bardell served as the National Union of Students' women's officer while studying at university. Her first jobs were with STV Glasgow and GMTV London, where she became an assistant producer of The Sunday Programme, a current affairs series.

== Political career ==
After first meeting Alex Salmond in 2007, Bardell joined the SNP's election campaign for the 2007 Scottish Parliament election. For three years, she worked for Salmond and Ian Hudghton MEP in his constituency office. Bardell then worked for the US State Department in their Edinburgh consulate, before joining the oil and gas industry, initially with Subsea 7, then for oil and gas service company Stork as head of communications and marketing for the UK, Africa & Norway. She left the oil and gas industry in acrimonious circumstances after three years, voluntarily signing a non-disclosure agreement (NDA) on leaving her position with Stork after allegations of bullying. She refused to state whether any payment was made to her in relation to the NDA.

Bardell contested the Livingston seat for the SNP in the 2015 general election. Her mother, Lis Bardell had previously finished in second place for the SNP in the same constituency at the 2010 general election. Bardell was elected with 32,736 votes (56.9%), a majority of 16,843 votes over the sitting Labour Party MP, Graeme Morrice, overturning a Labour majority of 10,791 votes at the 2010 general election. Bardell became Shadow SNP Westminster Group Leader (Business, Innovation and Skills) in October 2015 and latterly was Spokesperson for Small Business, Enterprise and Innovation.

She was re-elected at the 2017 general election, with a significantly reduced majority of 3,878 votes (7.4%).

In November 2018, Speaker John Bercow reprimanded Bardell for playing football in the debating chamber of the House of Commons at Westminster.

She was again re-elected at the 2019 general election, with an increased majority of 13,435 votes (24.6%).

In 2020 Bardell wrote to the Scottish Football Association (SFA) requesting that David Martindale, a convicted drug dealer, be allowed to become manager of Livingston FC. She tweeted that "The ability to be rehabilitated is a key part of an inclusive society"

In March 2021, The Sunday Times reported that Bardell suggested a curfew banning men from the streets after 6pm should be considered in areas where women have been killed.

In the 2024 United Kingdom general election she lost her seat to the Scottish Labour candidate Gregor Poynton.

== Post-parliamentary career ==
Following her defeat at the 2024 UK General Election, Bardell founded and worked as director at public affairs consultancy Hannah Kennedy-Bardell (HKB) Consulting Ltd. She also joined Scottish Media Training (SMT) to advise witnesses facing parliamentary committees.

== Personal life ==
Bardell was one of at least 45 LGBT MPs in the House of Commons as of December 2019. She is a lesbian and has also referred to herself as queer.

Following the 2015 general election, she said: "I only came out to myself and to my family during the election. I then chose not to say anything publicly because I had just got elected and I didn't want it to be one of the first things I said about myself as an MP".

In May 2024, she married Lucienne Kennedy.

Parliament of the United Kingdom
Preceded by Graeme Morrice	Member of Parliament for Livingston; 2015–2024	Succeeded by Gregor Poynton
