= Maureen Burke =

British politician, born 1958

Maureen Burke MP
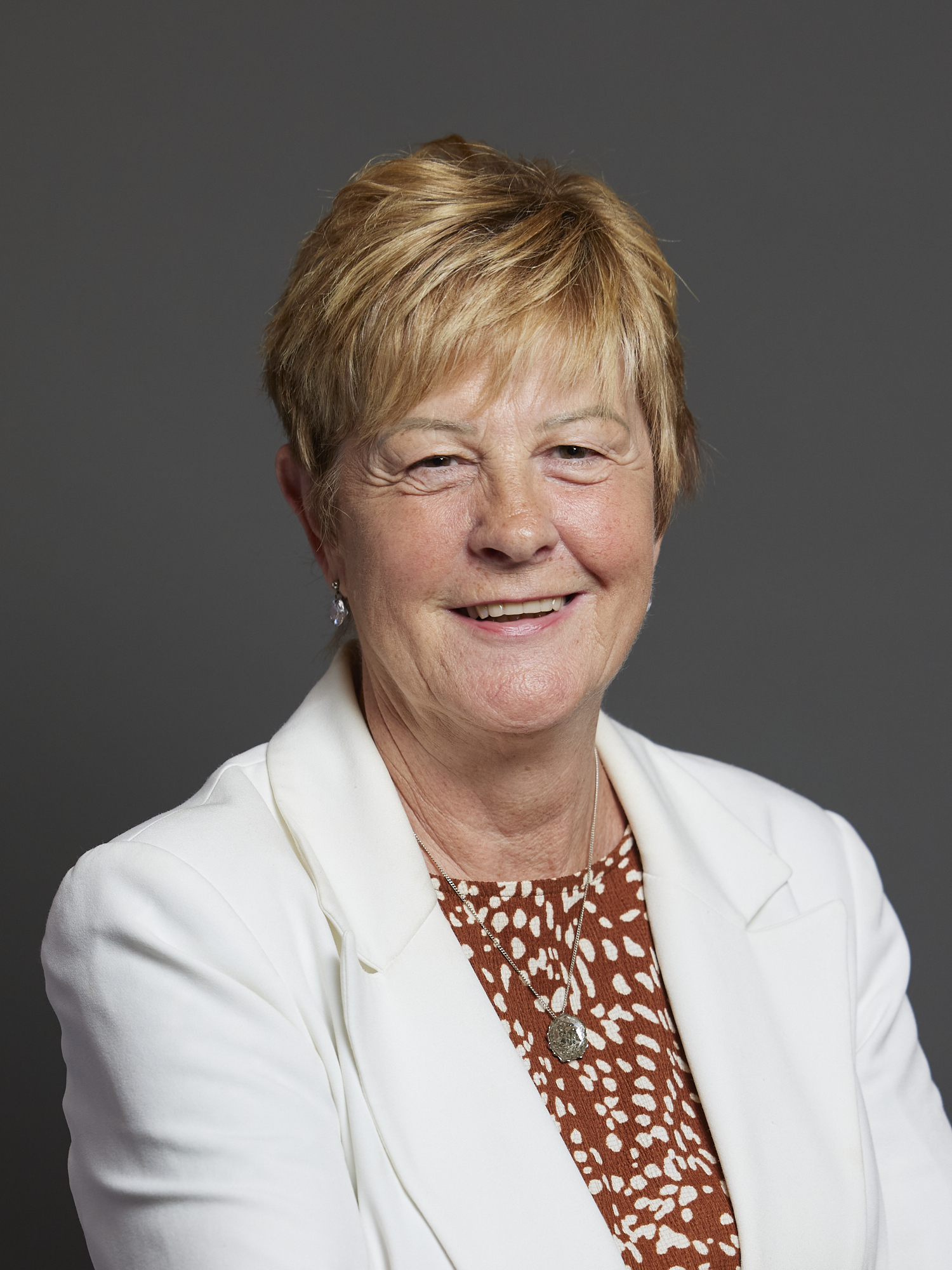
- Official portrait, 2024

Member of Parliament for Glasgow North East
- Incumbent
- Assumed office 4 July 2024
- Preceded by: Anne McLaughlin
- Majority: 4,637 (13.6%)

Glasgow City Council Councillor for North East
- In office 3 May 2012 – 2 September 2024

Personal details
- Born: September 1958 (age 67)
- Party: Labour
- Education: John Wheatley College

Maureen Burke (born September 1958) is a Scottish Labour politician who has been the Member of Parliament (MP) for Glasgow North East since 2024.

She was a Glasgow City Councillor, until her resignation on 2 September 2024.

== Career ==
Burke started work at Gelfer's tie manufacturing factory in Bridgeton, Glasgow in 1974. At age 39 she studied an IT course at John Wheatley College and later went on to work for a Member of the Scottish Parliament (MSP).

Since the 2012 Glasgow City Council election, she represented the North East ward on Glasgow City Council as a Councillor, and was the chair of the Glasgow City Council Operational Performance and Delivery Scrutiny Committee, until her resignation in September 2024.

In February 2024, Burke, then a Glasgow City Councillor missed a sitting of Full Council, where the City's £3 billion budget for 2024/27 was debated and set, due to being on a cruise.

At the 2024 general election, she was elected as the Labour Member of Parliament for Glasgow North East with a majority of 4,637 votes over the SNP incumbent, Anne McLaughlin.

In the 2025 Labour deputy leadership election she nominated Lucy Powell MP.

== Parliamentary career ==
In 2025, Burke joined nine other Scottish Labour MPs in a rebellion against the governments's welfare reforms.

Burke is the Chair of the new All Party Parliamentary Group on Grief Support and the Impact of Death on Society.

== Personal life ==
Burke lives in the Easterhouse area of Glasgow with her husband. She has one daughter and two granddaughters.
