= St Columba's School, Kilmacolm =

Independent school in Kilmacolm, Scotland

St Columba's School

Location
- Duchal Road and Knockbuckle Road; Kilmacolm, Inverclyde, PA13 4AU; Scotland; 55°53′34″N 4°38′08″W

Information
- Type: Private day school
- Motto: Orare, Laborare, Literisque, Studere
- Established: 1897
- Rector: Victoria Reilly
- Gender: Co-Educational
- Age range: 3–18
- Capacity: approx 650 pupils
- Houses: Craigmarloch; Duchal; Killalan; Strathgryffe
- Colours: Green and blue
- Publication: The Columban
- Affiliation: Headmasters' and Headmistresses' Conference
- Alumni: Columbans
- Website: www.st-columbas.org

St Columba's School is a 3–18 co-educational private day school in Kilmacolm, Inverclyde, Scotland, and is a member of the Headmasters' and Headmistresses' Conference.

The school provides both primary and secondary education between its Junior and Senior Schools.

In 2016, the School built a new building called the Girdwood Building which previously was home to Transitus, English, Guidance and Modern and Ancient Languages, but now houses the Junior School

== History ==
St Columba's was founded in 1897 at Duchal Road where the red sandstone building is still located. The preparatory school at St Columba's was formerly located at Shieldhall on Bridge of Weir Road. Boarders were once accepted and accommodated in Shallott, the current junior school building. The junior school was then located at Shieldhall on the Bridge of Weir Road. During the Second World War, Shieldhall was used as dormitories for evacuees from other schools, particularly those also owned by the Girls' Schools Company. The Knockbuckle Road site, which now houses the Junior School, was once occupied by boarders. When boarding ceased in 1970 it was developed and has been the site of the Junior School ever since.

St Columba's first admitted boys around 1978, and became fully co-educational in 1982.

== Sites ==
The senior school is on Duchal Road to the north of Kilmacolm's village centre. The junior school and new sports facilities, including rugby pitches are located on Birkmyre Park, with the hockey ground being a 3G artificial pitch.

== Notable staff ==
- Margaret Paulin Young, Founding Head 1897-1900
- Norah Neilson Gray taught art here, where she was nicknamed "Purple Patch".
- Sandra McGruther, author of the Detective Lorimer novels, writing as Alex Gray was an English teacher here
- Gordon Walker, Pipe Band instructor, was found guilty of abuse against six pupils at the school over a period of 10 years, in August 2019. Although he did not receive a prison sentence he was required to complete 300 hours of community service and was placed on the sex offender registry for 3 years.

== Notable alumni ==
- Ruth M. Arthur, author
- Winifred Drinkwater, aviator and aeroplane engineer
- Mairi Hedderwick, illustrator and author
- Eleanor Laing, MP
- Helen M. Laird, leader within the Girl Guide movement
- Rona Morison, actress
- Myrtle Simpson, skier
