= Gregor Poynton =

Scottish politician

Gregor Poynton MP
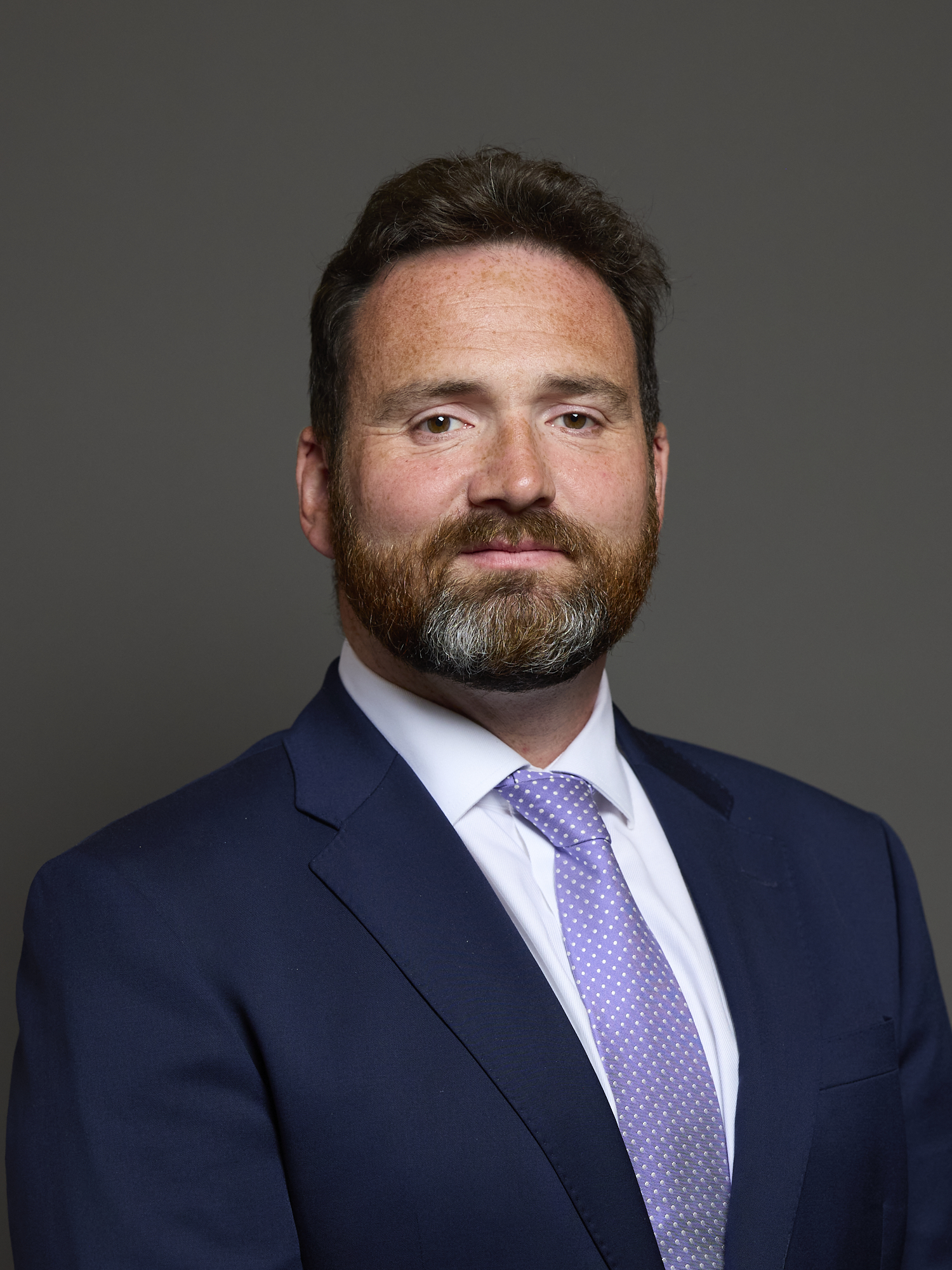
- Official portrait, 2024

Lord Commissioner of the Treasury
- Incumbent
- Assumed office 22 July 2026
- Prime Minister: Andy Burnham

Member of Parliament for Livingston
- Incumbent
- Assumed office 4 July 2024
- Preceded by: Hannah Bardell
- Majority: 3,538 (4.5%)

Personal details
- Born: Gregor Arthur Poynton; 1982 (age 43–44) Falkirk, Scotland
- Party: Labour

Gregor Arthur Poynton (born 1982) is a Scottish Labour Party politician who has served as the Member of Parliament (MP) for Livingston since 2024.

== Career ==
Poynton is from Falkirk, as are his parents. He previously tried to be selected as Labour's candidate in that constituency in 2013 but was unsuccessful. He was also reported as having paid for new members to support his nomination at the time.

Poynton has worked in communications since leaving education. From 2009 to 2014, Poynton worked for Blue State Digital, an online fundraising and campaign consultancy company.

Poynton worked at the Labour head office on the subject of election strategy as a director of external engagement and for also worked Jim Murphy when he was Scottish Labour leader. For a time, he led the global digital and creative teams at the government advisory company Consulum. From 2022, he was a partner at Headland Consultancy specialising in data, insights and digital communications.

In October 2023, he advocated for a new Scottish industrial strategy.

=== Parliamentary career ===
In the 2024 general election he was elected as MP for Livingston with 18,324 votes.

In January 2025, he was appointed chair of the All-Party Parliamentary Group (APPG) on Children's Online Safety.

In the September 2025 cabinet reshuffle Poynton was appointed to the ministerial position of assistant government whip.

== Personal life ==
He was previously married to former Labour MP Gemma Doyle, but he has since remarried Labour Special Adviser (SpAd) Amy Richards, sister to Labour MP Jake Richards MP.

He has two sons.
