= John Grady (politician) =

British politician

John Grady MP
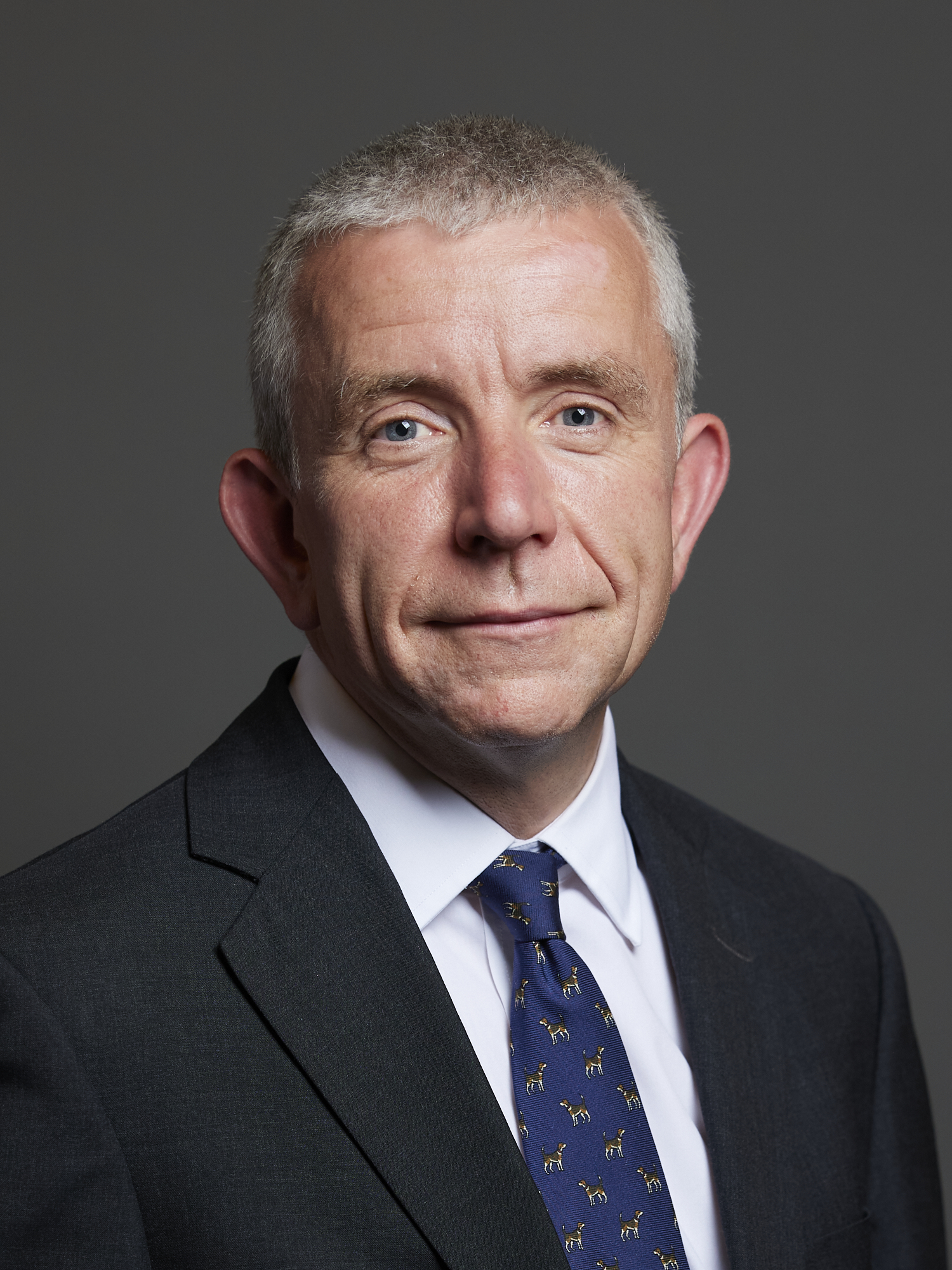
- Official portrait, 2024

Member of Parliament for Glasgow East
- Incumbent
- Assumed office 4 July 2024
- Preceded by: David Linden
- Majority: 3,784 (10.6%)

Personal details
- Born: John Andrew Dominic Grady
- Party: Labour
- Children: 2
- Education: The University of Edinburgh; King's College London

John Andrew Dominic Grady is a Scottish Labour politician who has been the Member of Parliament (MP) for Glasgow East since the 2024 general election.

== Career ==
Before standing as a candidate in the election, John was a Partner at Shepherd and Wedderburn, and a Commercial and Regulatory Solicitor at ScottishPower.

In the 2024 general election, he unseated SNP MP David Linden.

In December 2024, he replaced Lucy Rigby on the Treasury Select Committee. In January 2025, he was replaced by Sam Carling on the Public Administration and Constitutional Affairs Select Committee.

== Personal life ==
John is married to Glasgow City Council Councillor Jill Brown; they have two children, a daughter and a son. He has a Diploma in Legal Practice from The University of Edinburgh and a post-graduate Diploma in Competition Law from King's College London.
