= Livingston (UK Parliament constituency) =

UK Parliament constituency (since 1983)

Coordinates: 55.894°N 3.517°W

- County constituency for the House of Commons
- Location of Livingston within Scotland
- Subdivision: West Lothian
- Electorate: 75,454 (March 2020)
- Major settlements: Livingston, West Calder

Current constituency
- Created: 1983
- Member of Parliament: Gregor Poynton (Labour)
- Created from: Midlothian; West Lothian

Livingston is a county constituency of the House of Commons of the Parliament of the United Kingdom, to which it returns one Member of Parliament (MP). Elections are held using the first-past-the-post voting system. It has been represented since 2024 by Gregor Poynton of Scottish Labour.

It was formed from parts of the historic Midlothian and West Lothian constituencies for the 1983 general election. A similar constituency, also called Livingston, was used by the Scottish Parliament until 2011.

== Boundaries ==
1983–1997: The West Lothian District electoral divisions of Broxburn, Calders, Livingston North, and Livingston South; and the City of Edinburgh District ward of Kirkliston.

1997–2005: The West Lothian District electoral divisions of Broxburn/Uphall, Craigshill/Ladywell, Deans/Knightsridge, Dedridge/West Calder, and Murieston/East Calder.

2005–2024: Under the Fifth Review of UK Parliament constituencies which came into effect for the 2005 general election, a small part of the Linlithgow constituency was moved into Livingston. The contents of the constituency were defined as comprising the area of the West Lothian Council other than that part in the Linlithgow and East Falkirk constituency. Further to reviews of local government ward boundaries which came into effect in 2007 and 2017, but did not affect the parliamentary boundaries, the constituency comprised the West Lothian Council wards or part wards of Linlithgow (small part), Broxburn, Uphall and Winchburgh (apart from a very small area), Livingston North, Livingston South, East Livingston and East Calder, Fauldhouse and the Breich Valley, Whitburn and Blackburn (small part).

2024–present: Further to the 2023 review of Westminster constituencies which came into effect for the 2024 general election the constituency comprises the following wards or part wards of West Lothian Council:

- Broxburn, Uphall and Winchburgh (majority - excluding the village of Winchburgh), Livingston North, Livingston South, East Livingston and East Calder, Fauldhouse and the Breich Valley.

As a result of the boundary review, the communities of Winchburgh, Blackburn and Seafield were transferred to the new constituency of Bathgate and Linlithgow.

Map of boundaries 2005–2024

Map of boundaries from 2024

The constituency covers the eastern portion of the West Lothian council area, and is dominated by Livingston. It is bordered by the constituencies of Edinburgh West, Edinburgh South West, Dumfriesshire, Clydesdale and Tweeddale, Motherwell, Wishaw and Carluke, Airdrie and Shotts, and Bathgate and Linlithgow.

== Members of Parliament ==
The Member of Parliament for this seat had been Robin Cook of the Labour Party since its creation in 1983. Following his death on 6 August 2005, a by-election was held on 29 September, and Jim Devine was elected. On 8 February 2010, Devine was suspended from the Labour Party after he was charged with a criminal offence in relation to his parliamentary expenses. He was succeeded in 2010 by Labour's Graeme Morrice. Morrice was defeated by Hannah Bardell of the Scottish National Party (SNP) five years later. She in turn was defeated by Gregor Poynton in 2024.

Election	Member	Party	Notes
1983	Robin Cook	Labour	Foreign Secretary 1997–2001, Leader of the House of Commons 2001–2003, died in office 2005
2005 by-election	Jim Devine	Labour	Barred from standing at the 2010 general election by the Labour Party's National Executive Committee
2010	Graeme Morrice	Labour	
2015	Hannah Bardell	SNP	
2024	Gregor Poynton	Labour	

== Election results ==
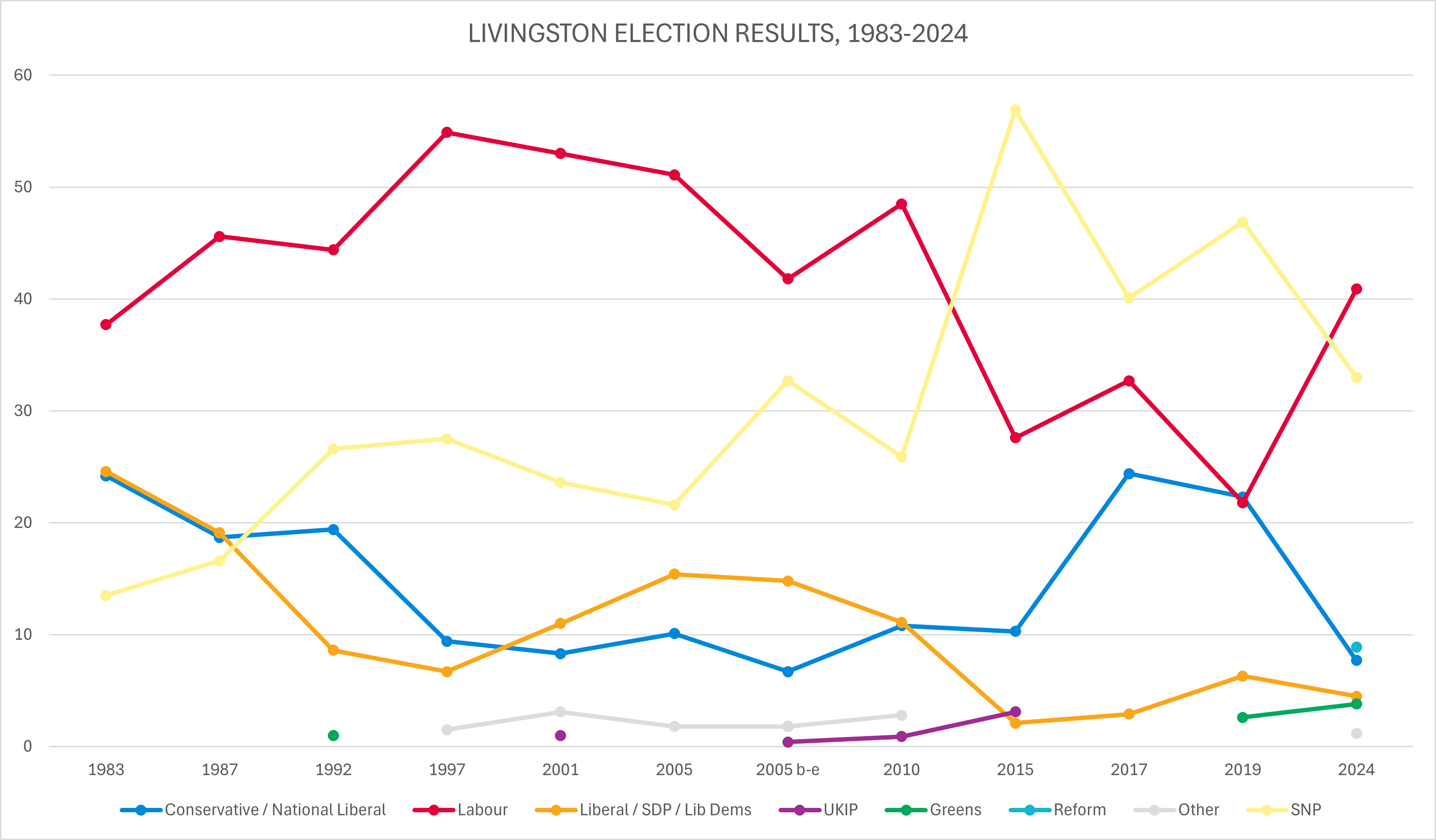
Election results 1983–2024

=== Elections in the 2020s ===
General election 2024: Livingston
Party	Candidate	Votes	%	±%
Labour	Gregor Poynton	18,324	40.9	+18.9
SNP	Hannah Bardell	14,796	33.0	−14.3
Reform	David McLennan	3,977	8.9	New
Conservative	Damian Doran-Timson	3,469	7.7	−14.2
Liberal Democrats	Caron Lindsay	2,025	4.5	−1.7
Green	Cameron Glasgow	1,704	3.8	+1.2
Alba	Debbie Ewen	545	1.2	New
Majority		3,528	7.9	N/A
Turnout		44,840	57.5	−7.8
Registered electors		78,043		
Labour gain from SNP		Swing	+16.6	

=== Elections in the 2010s ===
2019 notional result (Note: Estimate of the 2019 general election result as if the revised boundaries recommended under the 2023 boundary review were in place)
Party	Vote	%
SNP	23,275	47.3
Labour	10,851	22.0
Conservative	10,800	21.9
Liberal Democrats	3,056	6.2
Scottish Greens	1,272	2.6
Majority	12,424	25.2
Turnout	49,254	65.3
Electorate	75,454	

General election 2019: Livingston
Party	Candidate	Votes	%	±%
SNP	Hannah Bardell	25,617	46.9	+6.8
Conservative	Damian Timson	12,182	22.3	−2.1
Labour	Caitlin Kane	11,915	21.8	−10.9
Liberal Democrats	Charles Dundas	3,457	6.3	+3.4
Green	Cameron Glasgow	1,421	2.6	New
Majority		13,435	24.6	+17.2
Turnout		54,592	66.3	+1.6
SNP hold		Swing		

General election 2017: Livingston
Party	Candidate	Votes	%	±%
SNP	Hannah Bardell	21,036	40.1	−16.8
Labour	Rhea Wolfson	17,158	32.7	+5.1
Conservative	Damian Timson	12,799	24.4	+14.1
Liberal Democrats	Charles Dundas	1,512	2.9	+0.8
Majority		3,878	7.4	−21.9
Turnout		52,505	64.7	−5.2
SNP hold		Swing		

General election 2015: Livingston
Party	Candidate	Votes	%	±%
SNP	Hannah Bardell	32,736	56.9	+31.0
Labour	Graeme Morrice	15,893	27.6	−20.9
Conservative	Chris Donnelly	5,929	10.3	−0.5
UKIP	Nathan Somerville	1,757	3.1	+2.1
Liberal Democrats	Charles Dundas	1,232	2.1	−9.0
Majority		16,843	29.3	N/A
Turnout		57,547	69.9	+6.8
SNP gain from Labour		Swing	+25.9	

General election 2010: Livingston
Party	Candidate	Votes	%	±%
Labour	Graeme Morrice	23,215	48.5	−2.6
SNP	Lis Bardell	12,424	25.9	+4.3
Liberal Democrats	Charles Dundas	5,316	11.1	−4.3
Conservative	Alison Adamson-Ross	5,158	10.8	+0.7
BNP	David Orr	960	2.0	New
UKIP	Alistair Forrest	443	0.9	New
Scottish Socialist	Ally Hendry	242	0.5	−1.3
Independent	Jim Slavin	149	0.3	New
Majority		10,791	22.6	−6.9
Turnout		47,907	63.1	+5.0
Labour hold		Swing	−3.5	

=== Elections in the 2000s ===
By-election 2005: Livingston
Party	Candidate	Votes	%	±%
Labour	Jim Devine	12,319	41.8	−9.3
SNP	Angela Constance	9,639	32.7	+11.1
Liberal Democrats	Charles Dundas	4,362	14.8	−0.6
Conservative	Gordon Lindhurst	1,993	6.7	−3.4
Green	David Robertson	529	1.8	New
Scottish Socialist	Steven Nimmo	407	1.4	−0.4
UKIP	Peter Adams	108	0.4	New
Independent	Melville Brown	55	0.2	New
Alliance for Change	John Allman	33	0.1	New
Socialist (GB)	Brian Gardner	32	0.1	New
Majority		2,680	9.1	−20.4
Turnout		29,477	38.6	−19.5
Labour hold		Swing	−10.2	

General election 2005: Livingston
Party	Candidate	Votes	%	±%
Labour	Robin Cook	22,657	51.1	−1.9
SNP	Angela Constance	9,560	21.6	−2.0
Liberal Democrats	Charles Dundas	6,832	15.4	+5.5
Conservative	Alison Ross	4,499	10.1	+2.5
Scottish Socialist	Steven Nimmo	789	1.8	−1.2
Majority		13,097	29.5	+0.1
Turnout		44,337	58.1	+2.0
Labour hold		Swing	−1.2	

General election 2001: Livingston
Party	Candidate	Votes	%	±%
Labour	Robin Cook	19,108	53.0	−1.9
SNP	Graham Sutherland	8,492	23.6	−3.9
Liberal Democrats	Gordon Mackenzie	3,969	11.0	+4.3
Conservative	Ian Mowat	2,995	8.3	−1.1
Scottish Socialist	Wendy Milne	1,110	3.1	New
UKIP	Robert Kingdon	359	1.0	New
Majority		10,616	29.4	+2.0
Turnout		36,033	55.6	−15.4
Labour hold		Swing	+1.0	

=== Elections in the 1990s ===
General election 1997: Livingston
Party	Candidate	Votes	%	±%
Labour	Robin Cook	23,510	54.9	+10.5
SNP	Peter Johnston	11,763	27.5	+0.9
Conservative	Hugh Halkett	4,028	9.4	−10.0
Liberal Democrats	Ewan Hawthorn	2,876	6.7	−1.9
Referendum	Helen Campbell	444	1.0	New
Socialist (GB)	Matt Culbert	213	0.5	New
Majority		11,747	27.4	+9.6
Turnout		42,834	71.0	−3.6
Labour hold		Swing	+4.8	

General election 1992: Livingston
Party	Candidate	Votes	%	±%
Labour	Robin Cook	20,245	44.4	−1.2
SNP	Peter J.B. Johnston	12,140	26.6	+10.0
Conservative	Hugh Gordon	8,824	19.4	+0.7
Liberal Democrats	Fred Mackintosh	3,911	8.6	−10.5
Green	Alpin G. Ross-Smith	469	1.0	New
Majority		8,105	17.8	−8.7
Turnout		45,589	74.6	+0.5
Labour hold		Swing	−5.6	

=== Elections in the 1980s ===
General election 1987: Livingston
Party	Candidate	Votes	%	±%
Labour	Robin Cook	19,110	45.6	+7.9
Liberal	Robert McCreadie	8,005	19.1	−5.5
Conservative	Mark Mayall	7,860	18.7	−5.5
SNP	Kenny MacAskill	6,969	16.6	+3.1
Majority		11,105	26.5	+13.4
Turnout		41,944	74.1	+3.2
Labour hold		Swing	+6.7	

General election 1983: Livingston
Party	Candidate	Votes	%	±%
Labour	Robin Cook	14,255	37.7	−13.7
Liberal	Alexander Henderson	9,304	24.6	+16.4
Conservative	John Campbell	9,129	24.2	+7.1
SNP	Kenny MacAskill	5,090	13.5	−9.8
Majority		4,951	13.1	
Turnout		37,778	70.9	
Labour win (new seat)				

== See also ==
- List of UK Parliamentary constituencies in Scotland
