= List of United Kingdom Liberal Democrat MPs (2010–2015) =

This is a list of Liberal Democrat members of Parliament (MPs) elected to the House of Commons of the United Kingdom for the 55th Parliament of the UK (2010–2015). This specifies the 57 MPs elected at the 2010 general election.

== MPs ==
Name	Age	Constituency	In constituency since	First elected
Danny Alexander	54	Inverness, Nairn, Badenoch and Strathspey	2005	2005
Norman Baker	68	Lewes	1997	1997
Alan Beith	83	Berwick-upon-Tweed	1973	1973
Gordon Birtwistle	82	Burnley	2010	2010
Tom Brake	64	Carshalton and Wallington	1997	1997
Annette Brooke	79	Mid Dorset and North Poole	2001	2001
Jeremy Browne	56	Taunton Deane	2005	2005
Malcolm Bruce	81	Gordon	1983	1983
Paul Burstow	64	Sutton and Cheam	1997	1997
Lorely Burt	71	Solihull	2005	2005
Vince Cable	83	Twickenham	1997	1997
Sir Menzies Campbell	85	Fife North East	1987	1987
Alistair Carmichael	60	Orkney and Shetland	2001	2001
Nick Clegg	59	Sheffield Hallam	2005	2005
Michael Crockart	60	Edinburgh West	2010	2010
Ed Davey	60	Kingston and Surbiton	1997	1997
Tim Farron	56	Westmorland and Lonsdale	2005	2005
Lynne Featherstone	74	Hornsey and Wood Green	2005	2005
Don Foster	79	Bath	1992	1992
Andrew George	67	St Ives	1997	1997
Steve Gilbert	49	St Austell and Newquay	2010	2010
Duncan Hames	49	Chippenham	2010	2010
Mike Hancock	80	Portsmouth South	1997	1984
Nick Harvey	64	North Devon	1992	1992
David Heath	72	Somerton and Frome	1997	1997
John Hemming	66	Birmingham, Yardley	2005	2005
Martin Horwood	63	Cheltenham	2005	2005
Julian Huppert	47	Cambridge	2010	2010
Simon Hughes	75	Bermondsey and Old Southwark	2010	1983
Mike Thornton	74	Eastleigh	2013	2013
Mark Hunter	68	Cheadle	2005	2005
Charles Kennedy	66	Ross, Skye and Lochaber	2005	1983
Norman Lamb	68	North Norfolk	2001	2001
David Laws	60	Yeovil	2001	2001
John Leech	55	Manchester Withington	2005	2005
Stephen Lloyd	69	Eastbourne	2010	2010
Michael Moore	61	Berwickshire, Roxburgh and Selkirk	2005	1997
Greg Mulholland	55	Leeds North West	2005	2005
Tessa Munt	66	Wells	2010	2010
John Pugh	77	Southport	2001	2001
Alan Reid	71	Argyll and Bute	2001	2001
Sir Robert Smith, Bt.	68	West Aberdeenshire and Kincardine	1997	1997
Dan Rogerson	50	North Cornwall	2005	2005
Bob Russell	80	Colchester	1997	1997
Adrian Sanders	67	Torbay	1997	1997
Andrew Stunell	83	Hazel Grove	1997	1997
Ian Swales	73	Redcar	2010	2010
Jo Swinson	46	East Dunbartonshire	2005	2005
Sarah Teather	52	Brent Central	2010	2005
John Thurso	72	Caithness, Sutherland and Easter Ross	2001	2001
David Ward	72	Bradford East	2010	2010
Steve Webb	60	Thornbury and Yate	1997	1997
Mark Williams	60	Ceredigion	2005	2005
Roger Williams	78	Brecon and Radnorshire	2001	2001
Stephen Williams	59	Bristol West	2005	2005
Jenny Willott	52	Cardiff Central	2005	2005
Simon Wright	46	Norwich South	2010	2010

== See also ==
- List of MPs elected in the 2010 United Kingdom general election
- List of MPs for constituencies in England 2010–15
- List of MPs for constituencies in Northern Ireland 2010–15
- List of MPs for constituencies in Scotland 2010–15
- List of MPs for constituencies in Wales 2010–15
- List of United Kingdom Conservative MPs (2010–15)
- List of United Kingdom Liberal Democrat MPs (2015–17)
- Category:UK MPs 2010–2015
