= Justin Forsyth =

British public servant (born 1965)

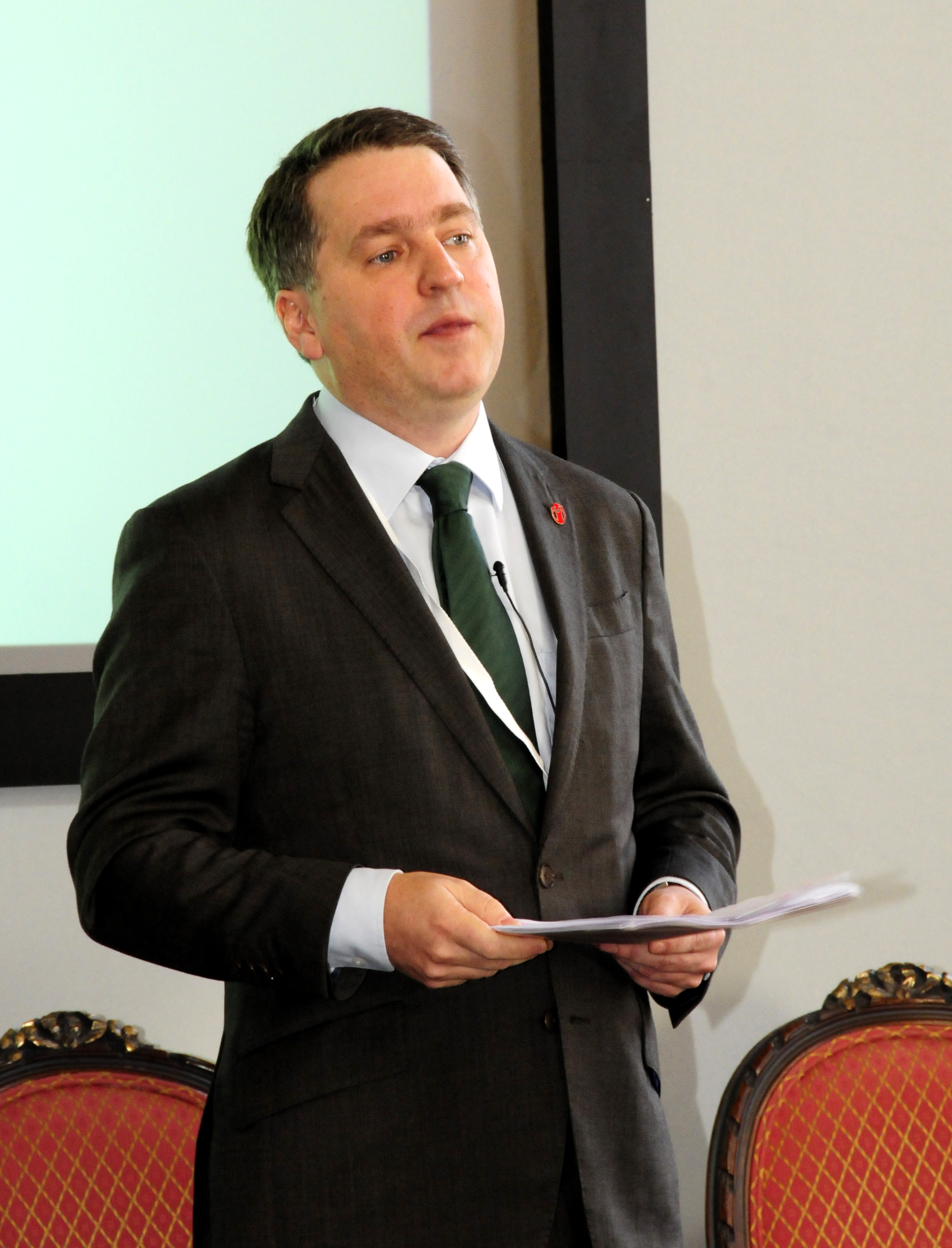
- Born: June 1965 (age 61); United Kingdom
- Education: Oxford Brookes University (BA)

Justin Forsyth is a British non-profit executive who served as the deputy executive director of UNICEF from 2016 to 2018. Prior to this appointment on 15 January 2016 by United Nations Secretary-General Ban Ki-moon, Forsyth was the chief executive officer of Save the Children.

== Early life and education ==
Forsyth was born in June 1965. He earned a bachelor's degree in history and politics from Oxford Brookes University.

== Career ==
Forsyth has been involved in advocacy campaigns, fundraising and coalitions which have collaborated with non-governmental organizations, the private sector, national governments and the United Nations.

Forsyth was employed by Oxfam from 1989 to 2004. While at Oxfam, he was employed alongside Kevin Watkins, who subsequently succeeded Forsyth as CEO of Save the Children.

Between 2004 and 2010, as special adviser to Prime Ministers Gordon Brown and Tony Blair, he helped shape global efforts on development, climate change and humanitarian policies, including leading successful efforts around the G8 and the G20. Forsyth served as an advisor to Prime Minister Gordon Brown, and acted as director of strategic communication at 10 Downing Street from 2007 to 2010. While campaigning, Brown voiced his irritation to Forsyth following a conversation with a voter, calling her "a bigoted woman." Brown had forgotten that he was still wearing a microphone once he had got into his car, and the conversation was captured on a hot mic. The controversy later became known as Bigotgate.

Forsyth was CEO of Save the Children from 2010 to 2016.

In January 2016 UNICEF announced Forsyth's appointment as deputy executive director.

In February 2018, it emerged that three female workers had accused Forsyth of inappropriate behaviour, texts, and emails before he left Save the Children; Forsyth said he had "apologised unreservedly" to them for his "unsuitable and thoughtless conversations". UNICEF later said that when Forsyth had joined it in 2016, Save the Children's reference for him had not mentioned the allegations and that it was "continuing to work with him and Save the Children to get a better understanding of the facts".

Forsyth resigned from UNICEF on 22 February 2018, wishing to avoid "serious damage to our cause and the case for aid" that might result from his continued affiliation.

After resigning from UNICEF, Forsyth founded North End Strategy, a communications and management consulting firm based in Oxfordshire.
