= List of MPs for constituencies in Northern Ireland (2010–2015) =

- May 6, 2010
- Colours on map indicate the party allegiance of each constituency's MP.

This is a list of members of Parliament (MPs) elected to the House of Commons of the United Kingdom by Northern Irish constituencies for the Fifty-Fifth Parliament of the United Kingdom (2010 to 2015).

It includes both MPs elected at the 2010 general election, held on 6 May 2010, and those subsequently elected in by-elections.

The list is sorted by the name of the MP, and MPs who did not serve throughout the Parliament are italicised. New MPs elected since the general election are noted at the bottom of the page.

Sinn Féin MPs choose not to take up their seats in the House of Commons.

== Current composition ==
Affiliation	Members
DUP	8
Sinn Féin	5
SDLP	3
Alliance	1
Independent Unionist	1
Total	18

== MPs ==
MP	Constituency	Party	In constituency since
Gregory Campbell, MLA	East Londonderry	DUP	2001
Nigel Dodds	Belfast North	DUP	2001
Pat Doherty	West Tyrone	Sinn Féin	2001
Jeffrey Donaldson	Lagan Valley	DUP	1997
Mark Durkan	Foyle	SDLP	2005
Michelle Gildernew	Fermanagh and South Tyrone	Sinn Féin	2001
Sylvia Hermon	North Down	Independent Unionist	2001
Naomi Long	Belfast East	Alliance	2010
William McCrea	South Antrim	DUP	2005
Alasdair McDonnell, MLA	Belfast South	SDLP	2005
Francie Molloy	Mid Ulster	Sinn Féin	2013 by-election
Paul Maskey	Belfast West	Sinn Féin	2011 by-election
Conor Murphy	Newry and Armagh	Sinn Féin	2005
Ian Paisley Jr	North Antrim	DUP	2010
Margaret Ritchie	South Down	SDLP	2010
Jim Shannon	Strangford	DUP	2010
David Simpson	Upper Bann	DUP	2005
Sammy Wilson, MLA	East Antrim	DUP	2005

== By-elections ==
- 2011 Belfast West by-election
- 2013 Mid Ulster by-election

== See also ==
- 2010 United Kingdom general election
- List of MPs elected in the 2010 United Kingdom general election
- List of MPs for constituencies in England 2010–15
- List of MPs for constituencies in Scotland 2010–15
- List of MPs for constituencies in Wales 2010–15
- Category:UK MPs 2010–2015
