= List of MPs for constituencies in England (2010–2015) =

- Colours on map indicate the party allegiance of each constituency's MP.

This is a list of members of Parliament (MPs) elected to the House of Commons of the United Kingdom by English constituencies for the Fifty-Fifth Parliament of the United Kingdom (2010 to present).

It includes both MPs elected at the 2010 general election, held on 6 May 2010, and those subsequently elected in by-elections.

The list is sorted by the name of the MP, and MPs who did not serve throughout the Parliament are italicised. New MPs elected since the general election are noted at the bottom of the page.

== Full composition before 2015 election ==
Affiliation	Members
Conservative	294
Labour	191
Liberal Democrats	42
UK Independence Party	2
Green Party	1
Independent	1
Speaker	1
Respect Party	1
Total	533

== MPs in the East of England region ==
Affiliation	Members
Conservative	51
Liberal Democrats	4
Labour	2
UKIP	1
Total	58

MP	Constituency	Party	In constituency since	Majority	Majority (%)
Peter Aldous	Waveney	Conservative	2010	769	1.5
David Amess	Southend West	Conservative	1997 (Note: Amess previously served as MP for Basildon from 1983 to 1997.)	7,270	16.7
Richard Bacon	South Norfolk	Conservative	2001	10,940	19.9
Steve Barclay	North East Cambridgeshire	Conservative	2010	16,425	31.4
John Baron	Basildon and Billericay	Conservative	2010 (Note: Baron was formerly the MP for Billericay since 2001 until the constituency was abolished.)	12,338	29.8
Henry Bellingham	North West Norfolk	Conservative	2001	14,810	31.0
Simon Burns	Chelmsford	Conservative	2010 (Note: Burns formerly the MP for West Chelmsford from 1997 until the constituency was abolished, and the previous incarnation of the Chelmsford constituency from 1987 until the constituency was abolished.)	5,110	9.4
Alistair Burt	North East Bedfordshire	Conservative	2001 (Note: Burt previously served as MP for Bury North from 1983 to 1997.)	18,942	34.1
Douglas Carswell	Clacton	UKIP	2014 by-election (Note: Carswell was previously elected as a Conservative in 2010, defected and subsequently resigned as an MP, triggering by-election which he won as a UKIP candidate. Carswell was formerly the MP for Harwich from 2005 until the constituency was abolished)	12,404	35.1
Brooks Newmark	Braintree	Conservative	2005	16,121	32.7
Thérèse Coffey	Suffolk Coastal	Conservative	2010	9,128	16.6
Jonathan Djanogly	Huntingdon	Conservative	2001	10,819	19.9
Nadine Dorries	Mid Bedfordshire	Conservative	2005	15,152	27.6
James Clappison	Hertsmere	Conservative	1992	17,605	37.2
Jackie Doyle-Price	Thurrock	Conservative	2010	92	0.2
James Duddridge	Rochford and Southend East	Conservative	2005	11,050	26.6
Mark Francois	Rayleigh and Wickford	Conservative	2010 (Note: Francois was formerly the MP for Rayleigh since 2001 until the constituency was abolished.)	22,338	42.7
George Freeman	Mid Norfolk	Conservative	2010	13,856	27.3
Richard Fuller	Bedford	Conservative	2010	1,353	3.0
David Gauke	South West Hertfordshire	Conservative	2005	14,920	26.3
Ben Gummer	Ipswich	Conservative	2010	2,079	4.4
Robert Halfon	Harlow	Conservative	2010	4,925	11.2
Matthew Hancock	West Suffolk	Conservative	2010	13,050	27.2
Richard Harrington	Watford	Conservative	2010	1,425	2.5
Rebecca Harris	Castle Point	Conservative	2010	7,632	17.0
Alan Haselhurst	Saffron Walden	Conservative	1977 (Note: Haselhurst previously served as MP for Middleton and Prestwich from 1970 to 1974.)	15,242	28.0
Oliver Heald	North East Hertfordshire	Conservative	1997 (Note: Heald was formerly the MP for North Hertfordshire since 1992 until the constituency was abolished.)	15,194	30.1
Kelvin Hopkins	Luton North	Labour	1997	7,520	17.5
Julian Huppert	Cambridge	Liberal Democrats	2010	6,792	13.5
Stewart Jackson	Peterborough	Conservative	2005	4,861	10.9
Bernard Jenkin	Harwich and North Essex	Conservative	2010 (Note: Jenkin was formerly the MP for North Essex since 1997 until the constituency was abolished, and for Colchester North since 1992 until the constituency was abolished.)	11,447	23.3
Eleanor Laing	Epping Forest	Conservative	1997	15,131	32.5
Norman Lamb	North Norfolk	Liberal Democrats	2001	11,626	23.4
Andrew Lansley	South Cambridgeshire	Conservative	1997	7,838	13.3
Brandon Lewis	Great Yarmouth	Conservative	2010	4,276	9.9
Peter Lilley	Hitchin and Harpenden	Conservative	1997 (Note: Lilley previously served as MP for St Albans from 1983 to 1997.)	15,271	27.9
Anne Main	St Albans	Conservative	2005	2,305	4.4
Stephen McPartland	Stevenage	Conservative	2010	3,578	8.0
Stephen Metcalfe	South Basildon and East Thurrock	Conservative	2010	5,772	12.9
Jim Paice	South East Cambridgeshire	Conservative	1987	5,946	10.4
Priti Patel	Witham	Conservative	2010	15,196	32.4
Mike Penning	Hemel Hempstead	Conservative	2005	13,406	27.1
Eric Pickles	Brentwood and Ongar	Conservative	1992	16,920	33.4
Daniel Poulter	Central Suffolk and North Ipswich	Conservative	2010	13,786	25.8
Mark Prisk	Hertford and Stortford	Conservative	2001	15,437	27.8
David Ruffley	Bury St Edmunds	Conservative	1997	12,380	21.1
Bob Russell	Colchester	Liberal Democrats	1997	6,982	15.1
Andrew Selous	South West Bedfordshire	Conservative	2001	16,649	32.8
Grant Shapps	Welwyn Hatfield	Conservative	2005	17,423	35.6
Gavin Shuker	Luton South	Labour Co-op	2010	2,329	5.5
Keith Simpson	Broadland	Conservative	2010 (Note: Simpson previously served as MP for Mid Norfolk from 1997 to 2010.)	7,292	13.8
Chloe Smith	Norwich North	Conservative	2009	3,901	9.2
Liz Truss	South West Norfolk	Conservative	2010	13,140	26.7
Shailesh Vara	North West Cambridgeshire	Conservative	2005	16,677	28.6
Charles Walker	Broxbourne	Conservative	2005	18,804	41.2
John Whittingdale	Maldon	Conservative	2010 (Note: Whittingdale was formerly the MP for Maldon and East Chelmsford since 1997 until the constituency was abolished, and for South Colchester and Maldon since 1992 until the constituency was abolished.)	19,407	40.5
Simon Wright	Norwich South	Liberal Democrats	2010	310	0.7
Tim Yeo	South Suffolk	Conservative	1983	8,689	16.9

== MPs in the East Midlands region ==
Affiliation	Members
Conservative	30
Labour	16
Total	46

MP	Constituency	Party	In constituency since	Majority	Majority (%)
Graham Allen	Nottingham North	Labour	1987	8,138	23.8
Jonathan Ashworth	Leicester South	Labour	2011 by-election	12,078	35.3
Margaret Beckett	Derby South	Labour	1983 (Note: Beckett previously served as MP for Lincoln from 1974 to 1979.)	6,122	14.8
Andrew Bingham	High Peak	Conservative	2010	4,677	9.3
Brian Binley	Northampton South	Conservative	2005	6,004	15.4
Nick Boles	Grantham and Stamford	Conservative	2010	14,826	28.1
Peter Bone	Wellingborough	Conservative	2005	11,787	22.8
Andrew Bridgen	North West Leicestershire	Conservative	2010	7,511	14.5
Kenneth Clarke	Rushcliffe	Conservative	1970	15,811	29.5
Vernon Coaker	Gedling	Labour	1997	1,859	3.8
Gloria De Piero	Ashfield	Labour	2010	192	0.4
Stephen Dorrell	Charnwood	Conservative	1997 (Note: Dorrell previously served as MP for Loughborough from 1979 to 1997.)	15,029	28.1
Alan Duncan	Rutland and Melton	Conservative	1992	14,000	25.4
Michael Ellis	Northampton North	Conservative	2010	1,936	4.8
Natascha Engel	North East Derbyshire	Labour	2005	2,445	5.2
Edward Garnier	Harborough	Conservative	1992	9,877	18.0
Lilian Greenwood	Nottingham South	Labour	2010	1,772	4.4
John Hayes	South Holland and The Deepings	Conservative	1997	21,880	43.6
Chris Heaton-Harris	Daventry	Conservative	2010	19,188	37.1
Philip Hollobone	Kettering	Conservative	2010	9,094	19.2
Robert Jenrick	Newark	Conservative	2014 by-election	7,403	19.1
Liz Kendall	Leicester West	Labour	2010	4,017	11.2
Pauline Latham	Mid Derbyshire	Conservative	2010	11,292	23.8
Andrea Leadsom	South Northamptonshire	Conservative	2010	20,478	34.2
Jessica Lee	Erewash	Conservative	2010	2,501	5.3
Edward Leigh	Gainsborough	Conservative	1997 (Note: Leigh was formerly the MP for Gainsborough and Horncastle since 1983 until the constituency was abolished.)	10,559	21.5
Chris Leslie	Nottingham East	Labour Co-op	2010 (Note: Leslie previously served as MP for Shipley from 1997 to 2005.)	6,969	21.1
John Mann	Bassetlaw	Labour	2001	8,215	16.6
Karl McCartney	Lincoln	Conservative	2010	1,058	2.3
Patrick McLoughlin	Derbyshire Dales	Conservative	2010 (Note: McLoughlin was formerly the MP for West Derbyshire from a 1986 by-election until the constituency was abolished.)	13,866	29.6
Alan Meale	Mansfield	Labour	1987	6,012	12.4
Louise Mensch	Corby	Conservative	2010	1,895	3.5
Patrick Mercer	Newark	Independent (Note: Mercer was elected as a Conservative MP, but resigned the Conservative whip in May 2013 and sat as an independent until his resignation as an MP in April 2014.)	2001	16,152	31.6
Nigel Mills	Amber Valley	Conservative	2010	536	1.2
Nicky Morgan	Loughborough	Conservative	2010	3,744	7.1
Toby Perkins	Chesterfield	Labour	2010	549	1.2
Stephen Phillips	Sleaford and North Hykeham	Conservative	2010	19,905	33.4
Andrew Robathan	South Leicestershire	Conservative	2010 (Note: Robathan was formerly the MP for Blaby since 1992 until the constituency was abolished.)	15,524	28.5
Andy Sawford	Corby	Labour Co-op	2012 by-election	7,791	21.8
Mark Simmonds	Boston and Skegness	Conservative	2001	12,426	28.8
Dennis Skinner	Bolsover	Labour	1970	11,183	25.4
Anna Soubry	Broxtowe	Conservative	2010	389	0.7
Peter Soulsby	Leicester South	Labour	2005	8,808	18.7
Mark Spencer	Sherwood	Conservative	2010	214	0.4
Peter Tapsell	Louth and Horncastle	Conservative	1997 (Note: Tapsell was formerly the MP for East Lindsey since 1983 until the constituency was abolished, and Horncastle since 1966 until the constituency was abolished, and previously served as MP for Nottingham West from 1953 to 1964.)	13,871	27.4
David Tredinnick	Bosworth	Conservative	1987	5,032	9.3
Keith Vaz	Leicester East	Labour	1987	14,082	29.3
Heather Wheeler	South Derbyshire	Conservative	2010	7,128	14.1
Chris Williamson	Derby North	Labour	2010	613	1.4

== MPs in the London region ==
Affiliation	Members
Labour	38
Conservative	28
Liberal Democrats	7
Total	73

MP	Constituency	Party	In constituency since	Majority	Majority (%)
Diane Abbott	Hackney North and Stoke Newington	Labour	1987	14,461	31.1
Heidi Alexander	Lewisham East	Labour	2010	6,216	14.9
Rushanara Ali	Bethnal Green and Bow	Labour	2010	11,574	22.8
Gavin Barwell	Croydon Central	Conservative	2010	2,879	5.8
Bob Blackman	Harrow East	Conservative	2010	3,403	7.1
Tom Brake	Carshalton and Wallington	Liberal Democrats	1997	5,260	11.5
Angie Bray	Ealing Central and Acton	Conservative	2010	3,716	7.9
James Brokenshire	Old Bexley and Sidcup	Conservative	2010 (Note: Brokenshire was formerly the MP for Hornchurch since 2005 until the constituency was abolished.)	15,857	34.9
Lyn Brown	West Ham	Labour	2005	22,534	48.0
Karen Buck	Westminster North	Labour	2010 (Note: Buck was formerly the MP for Regent's Park and Kensington North since 1997 until the constituency was abolished.)	2,126	5.4
David Burrowes	Enfield Southgate	Conservative	2005	7,626	17.2
Paul Burstow	Sutton and Cheam	Liberal Democrats	1997	1,608	3.3
Vince Cable	Twickenham	Liberal Democrats	1997	12,140	20.3
Jeremy Corbyn	Islington North	Labour	1983	12,401	27.8
Stella Creasy	Walthamstow	Labour Co-op	2010	9,478	23.1
Jon Cruddas	Dagenham and Rainham	Labour	2010 (Note: Cruddas was formerly the MP for Dagenham since 2001 until the constituency was abolished.)	2,630	5.9
John Cryer	Leyton and Wanstead	Labour	2010 (Note: Cryer previously served as MP for Hornchurch from 1997 to 2005.)	6,416	16.0
Ed Davey	Kingston and Surbiton	Liberal Democrats	1997	7,560	13.2
Nick de Bois	Enfield North	Conservative	2010	1,692	3.8
Frank Dobson	Holborn and St Pancras	Labour	1983 (Note: Dobson was formerly the MP for Holborn and St Pancras South since 1979 until the constituency was abolished.)	9,942	17.8
Jim Dowd	Lewisham West and Penge	Labour	2010 (Note: Dowd was formerly the MP for Lewisham West since 1992 until the constituency was abolished.)	5,828	13.0
Iain Duncan Smith	Chingford and Woodford Green	Conservative	1997 (Note: Duncan Smith was formerly the MP for Chingford since 1992 until the constituency was abolished.)	12,963	30.1
Clive Efford	Eltham	Labour	1997	2,693	6.2
Jane Ellison	Battersea	Conservative	2010	5,977	12.2
David Evennett	Bexleyheath and Crayford	Conservative	2005 (Note: Evennett previously served as MP for Erith and Crayford from 1983 to 1997.)	10,344	24.0
Lynne Featherstone	Hornsey and Wood Green	Liberal Democrats	2005	6,875	12.5
Mark Field	Cities of London and Westminster	Conservative	2001	11,076	30.0
Jim Fitzpatrick	Poplar and Limehouse	Labour	2010 (Note: Fitzpatrick was formerly the MP for Poplar and Canning Town since 1997 until the constituency was abolished.)	6,030	12.9
Mike Freer	Finchley and Golders Green	Conservative	2010	5,809	12.3
Mike Gapes	Ilford South	Labour Co-op	1992	11,297	22.0
Barry Gardiner	Brent North	Labour	1997	8,028	15.4
Zac Goldsmith	Richmond Park	Conservative	2010	4,091	6.9
Justine Greening	Putney	Conservative	2005	10,053	24.6
Stephen Hammond	Wimbledon	Conservative	2005	11,408	24.1
Greg Hands	Chelsea and Fulham	Conservative	2010 (Note: Hands was formerly the MP for Hammersmith and Fulham since 2005 until the constituency was abolished.)	16,722	42.0
Harriet Harman	Camberwell and Peckham	Labour	2010 (Note: Harman was formerly the MP for Peckham since a 1982 by-election until the constituency was abolished.)	17,187	36.8
Meg Hillier	Hackney South and Shoreditch	Labour Co-op	2005	14,288	33.3
Margaret Hodge	Barking	Labour	1994	16,555	36.5
Kate Hoey	Vauxhall	Labour	1989	10,651	24.7
Simon Hughes	Bermondsey and Old Southwark	Liberal Democrats	2010 (Note: Hughes was formerly the MP for North Southwark and Bermondsey since 1997 until the constituency was abolished, and formerly Southwark and Bermondsey from a 1983 until the constituency was abolished, and formerly Bermondsey from a 1983 by-election until the constituency was abolished.)	8,530	19.1
Nick Hurd	Ruislip, Northwood and Pinner	Conservative	2010 (Note: Hurd was formerly the MP for Ruislip-Northwood since 2005 until the constituency was abolished.)	19,060	38.0
Glenda Jackson	Hampstead and Kilburn	Labour	2010 (Note: Jackson was formerly the MP for Hampstead and Highgate since 1992 until the constituency was abolished.)	42	0.08
Jo Johnson	Orpington	Conservative	2010	17,200	35.2
Tessa Jowell	Dulwich and West Norwood	Labour	1997 (Note: Jowell was formerly the MP for Dulwich since 1992 until the constituency was abolished.)	9,365	19.4
Alan Keen	Feltham and Heston	Labour Co-op	1992	4,658	9.6
Sadiq Khan	Tooting	Labour	2005	2,524	5.0
David Lammy	Tottenham	Labour	2000	16,931	41.6
Andy Love	Edmonton	Labour Co-op	1997	9,613	23.9
Mary Macleod	Brentford and Isleworth	Conservative	2010	1,958	3.6
Seema Malhotra	Feltham and Heston	Labour Co-op	2011 by-election	6,203	26.7
Siobhain McDonagh	Mitcham and Morden	Labour	1997	13,666	31.3
John McDonnell	Hayes and Harlington	Labour	1997	10,824	25.4
Bob Neill	Bromley and Chislehurst	Conservative	2006	13,900	31.6
Matthew Offord	Hendon	Conservative	2010	106	0.2
Richard Ottaway	Croydon South	Conservative	1992 (Note: Ottaway previously served as MP for Nottingham North from 1983 to 1987.)	15,818	28.1
Teresa Pearce	Erith and Thamesmead	Labour	2010	5,703	13.4
Stephen Pound	Ealing North	Labour	1997	9,301	19.4
John Randall	Uxbridge and South Ruislip	Conservative	2010 (Note: Randall was formerly the MP for Uxbridge since 1997 until the constituency was abolished.)	11,216	24.9
Nick Raynsford	Greenwich and Woolwich	Labour	1997 (Note: Raynsford was formerly the MP for Greenwich since 1992 until the constituency was abolished, and previously served as MP for Fulham from a 1986 by-election to 1987.)	10,153	24.7
Steve Reed	Croydon North	Labour	2012 by-election	11,755	47.9
Malcolm Rifkind	Kensington	Conservative	2010 (Note: Rifkind was formerly the MP for Kensington and Chelsea since 2005 until the constituency was abolished, and previously served as MP for Edinburgh Pentlands from February 1974 to 1997.)	8,616	24.6
Andrew Rosindell	Romford	Conservative	2001	16,954	36.5
Joan Ruddock	Lewisham Deptford	Labour	1987	12,499	30.3
Lee Scott	Ilford North	Conservative	2005	5,404	11.5
Virendra Sharma	Ealing Southall	Labour	2007	9,291	21.7
Andy Slaughter	Hammersmith	Labour	2010 (Note: Slaughter was formerly the MP for Ealing, Acton and Shepherd's Bush since 2005 until the constituency was abolished.)	3,549	7.5
Bob Stewart	Beckenham	Conservative	2010	17,784	37.3
Sarah Teather	Brent Central	Liberal Democrats	2010 (Note: Teather was formerly the MP for Brent East from a 2003 by-election until the constituency was abolished.)	1,345	3.0
Gareth Thomas	Harrow West	Labour Co-op	1997	3,143	6.8
Emily Thornberry	Islington South and Finsbury	Labour	2005	3,569	8.2
Stephen Timms	East Ham	Labour	1997 (Note: Timms was formerly the MP for Newham North East from a 1994 by-election until the constituency was abolished.)	27,826	55.2
Chuka Umunna	Streatham	Labour	2010	3,259	7.0
Theresa Villiers	Chipping Barnet	Conservative	2005	11,927	23.6
Angela Watkinson	Hornchurch and Upminster	Conservative	2010 (Note: Watkinson was formerly the MP for Upminster since 2001 until the constituency was abolished.)	16,371	30.7
Malcolm Wicks	Croydon North	Labour	1997 (Note: Wicks was formerly the MP for Croydon North West since 1992 until the constituency was abolished.)	16,481	31.9

== MPs in the North East region ==
Affiliation	Members
Labour	25
Conservative	2
Liberal Democrats	2
Total	29

MP	Constituency	Party	In constituency since	Majority	Majority (%)
David Anderson	Blaydon	Labour	2005	9,117	20.3
Alan Beith	Berwick-upon-Tweed	Liberal Democrats	1973	2,690	7.0
Stuart Bell	Middlesbrough	Labour	1983	8,689	26.0
Roberta Blackman-Woods	City of Durham	Labour	2005	3,067	6.6
Tom Blenkinsop	Middlesbrough South and East Cleveland	Labour	2010	1,677	3.6
Nick Brown	Newcastle upon Tyne East	Labour	2010 (Note: Brown was formerly the MP for Newcastle upon Tyne East and Wallsend from 1983 until the constituency was abolished.)	4,453	11.7
Alan Campbell	Tynemouth	Labour	1987	5,739	10.9
Ronnie Campbell	Blyth Valley	Labour	1987	6,668	17.3
Jenny Chapman	Darlington	Labour	2010	3,388	7.9
Alex Cunningham	Stockton North	Labour	2010	6,676	16.9
Julie Elliott	Sunderland Central	Labour	2010	6,725	15.8
Pat Glass	North West Durham	Labour	2010	7,612	17.4
Mary Glindon	North Tyneside	Labour	2010	12,884	27.8
Helen Goodman	Bishop Auckland	Labour	2005	5,218	12.7
Stephen Hepburn	Jarrow	Labour	1997	12,908	33.3
Sharon Hodgson	Washington and Sunderland West	Labour	2010 (Note: Hodgson was formerly the MP for Gateshead East and Washington West from 2005 until the constituency was abolished.)	11,458	30.7
Kevan Jones	North Durham	Labour	2001	12,076	29.5
Ian Lavery	Wansbeck	Labour	2010	7,031	18.4
Emma Lewell-Buck	South Shields	Labour	2013 by-election	6,505	26.2
David Miliband	South Shields	Labour	2001	11,109	30.4
Andy McDonald	Middlesbrough	Labour	2012 by-election	8,211	47.7
Catherine McKinnell	Newcastle upon Tyne North	Labour	2010	3,414	7.8
Ian Mearns	Gateshead	Labour	2010	12,549	32.8
Grahame Morris	Easington	Labour	2010	14,982	42.9
Chi Onwurah	Newcastle upon Tyne Central	Labour	2010	7,464	21.8
Guy Opperman	Hexham	Conservative	2010	5,788	13.3
Bridget Phillipson	Houghton and Sunderland South	Labour	2010	10,990	28.9
Ian Swales	Redcar	Liberal Democrats	2010	5,214	12.4
James Wharton	Stockton South	Conservative	2010	332	0.6
Phil Wilson	Sedgefield	Labour	2007	8,696	21.6
Iain Wright	Hartlepool	Labour	2004	5,509	14.4

== MPs in the North West region ==
Affiliation	Members
Labour	47
Conservative	22
Liberal Democrats	6
Total	75

MP	Constituency	Party	In constituency since	Majority	Majority (%)
Debbie Abrahams	Oldham East and Saddleworth	Labour	2011 by-election	3,558	10.2
Joe Benton	Bootle	Labour	1990	21,181	51.4
Luciana Berger	Liverpool Wavertree	Labour Co-op	2010	7,167	18.9
Jake Berry	Rossendale and Darwen	Conservative	2010	4,493	9.5
Gordon Birtwistle	Burnley	Liberal Democrats	2010	1,818	4.3
Hazel Blears	Salford and Eccles	Labour	2010 (Note: Blears was formerly the MP for Salford since 1997 until the constituency was abolished.)	5,725	13.8
Graham Brady	Altrincham and Sale West	Conservative	2010	11,595	23.4
Fiona Bruce	Congleton	Conservative	2010	7,063	13.9
Andy Burnham	Leigh	Labour	2001	12,011	27.1
Ann Coffey	Stockport	Labour	1992	6,784	17.4
Rosie Cooper	West Lancashire	Labour	2005	4,343	8.9
David Crausby	Bolton North East	Labour	1997	4,084	9.4
Tony Cunningham	Workington	Labour	2001	4,575	11.6
Simon Danczuk	Rochdale	Labour	2010	889	2.0
Jim Dobbin	Heywood and Middleton	Labour Co-op	1997	5,971	12.9
Angela Eagle	Wallasey	Labour	1992	8,507	20.4
Maria Eagle	Garston and Halewood	Labour	2010 (Note: Maria Eagle was formerly the MP for Liverpool Garston since 1997 until the constituency was abolished.)	16,877	39.4
Louise Ellman	Liverpool Riverside	Labour Co-op	1997	14,173	36.6
Bill Esterson	Sefton Central	Labour	2010	3,862	8.0
Graham Evans	Weaver Vale	Conservative	2010	991	2.2
Nigel Evans	Ribble Valley	Conservative	1992	14,769	28.3
Tim Farron	Westmorland and Lonsdale	Liberal Democrats	2005	12,264	23.8
Frank Field	Birkenhead	Labour	1979	15,395	43.6
Yvonne Fovargue	Makerfield	Labour	2010	12,490	28.5
Lorraine Fullbrook	South Ribble	Conservative	2010	5,554	10.8
Paul Goggins	Wythenshawe and Sale East	Labour	1997	7,575	18.5
Kate Green	Stretford and Urmston	Labour	2010	8,935	19.9
Andrew Gwynne	Denton and Reddish	Labour	2005	9,831	26.1
Mark Hendrick	Preston	Labour Co-op	2000	7,733	23.8
David Heyes	Ashton-under-Lyne	Labour	2001	9,094	23.7
Julie Hilling	Bolton West	Labour	2010	92	0.2
George Howarth	Knowsley	Labour	2010 (Note: Howarth was formerly the MP for Knowsley North and Sefton East since 1997 until the constituency was abolished, and formerly the MP for Knowsley North from a 1986 by-election until the constituency was abolished.)	25,686	57.5
Lindsay Hoyle	Chorley	Labour	1997	2,593	5.2
Mark Hunter	Cheadle	Liberal Democrats	2005	3,272	6.3
Graham Jones	Hyndburn	Labour	2010	3,090	7.2
Helen Jones	Warrington North	Labour	1997	6,771	15.3
Mike Kane	Wythenshawe and Sale East	Labour	2014 by-election	8,960	37.4
Gerald Kaufman	Manchester Gorton	Labour	1983 (Note: Kaufman was formerly the MP for Manchester Ardwick since 1970 until the constituency was abolished.)	6,703	17.5
Barbara Keeley	Worsley and Eccles South	Labour	2010 (Note: Keeley was formerly the MP for Worsley since 2005 until the constituency was abolished.)	4,337	10.4
John Leech	Manchester Withington	Liberal Democrats	2005	1,850	4.1
Ivan Lewis	Bury South	Labour	1997	3,292	6.8
Tony Lloyd	Manchester Central	Labour	1997 (Note: Lloyd was formerly the MP for Stretford since 1983 until the constituency was abolished.)	10,430	26.1
Gordon Marsden	Blackpool South	Labour	1997	1,852	5.3
Paul Maynard	Blackpool North and Cleveleys	Conservative	2010	2,150	5.3
Alison McGovern	Wirral South	Labour	2010	531	1.3
Liz McInnes	Heywood and Middleton	Labour	2014 by-election	617	2.2
Esther McVey	Wirral West	Conservative	2010	2,436	6.2
Michael Meacher	Oldham West and Royton	Labour	1997 (Note: Meacher was formerly the MP for Oldham West since 1970 until the constituency was abolished.)	9,352	21.8
Mark Menzies	Fylde	Conservative	2010	13,185	30.1
Andrew Miller	Ellesmere Port and Neston	Labour	1992	4,331	9.7
David Morris	Morecambe and Lunesdale	Conservative	2010	866	2.0
Stephen Mosley	City of Chester	Conservative	2010	2,583	5.5
David Mowat	Warrington South	Conservative	2010	1,553	2.8
Lisa Nandy	Wigan	Labour	2010	10,487	23.8
David Nuttall	Bury North	Conservative	2010	2,243	5.0
Stephen O'Brien	Eddisbury	Conservative	1999	13,255	29.2
Eric Ollerenshaw	Lancaster and Fleetwood	Conservative	2010	333	0.8
George Osborne	Tatton	Conservative	2001	14,487	32.0
Lucy Powell	Manchester Central	Labour Co-op	2012 by-election	9,936	59.7
John Pugh	Southport	Liberal Democrats	2001	6,024	13.8
Yasmin Qureshi	Bolton South East	Labour	2010	8,634	21.8
Jamie Reed	Copeland	Labour	2005	3,833	8.9
Jonathan Reynolds	Stalybridge and Hyde	Labour Co-op	2010	2,744	6.7
Steve Rotheram	Liverpool Walton	Labour	2010	19,818	57.8
David Rutley	Macclesfield	Conservative	2010	11,959	23.9
Andrew Stephenson	Pendle	Conservative	2010	3,585	8.0
John Stevenson	Carlisle	Conservative	2010	853	2.0
Rory Stewart	Penrith and The Border	Conservative	2010	11,241	24.9
Jack Straw	Blackburn	Independent (Note: Straw was elected as a Labour MP, but resigned the Labour whip in January 2015 and sat as an independent for the remainder of the Parliament.)	1979	9,856	21.7
Graham Stringer	Blackley and Broughton	Labour	2010 (Note: Stringer was formerly the MP for Manchester Blackley since 1997 until the constituency was abolished.)	12,303	36.0
Andrew Stunell	Hazel Grove	Liberal Democrats	1997	6,371	15.2
Edward Timpson	Crewe and Nantwich	Conservative	2008	6,046	11.8
Derek Twigg	Halton	Labour	1997	15,504	37.5
Stephen Twigg	Liverpool West Derby	Labour Co-op	2010 (Note: Twigg previously served as MP for Enfield Southgate from 1997 to 2005.)	18,467	50.6
Ben Wallace	Wyre and Preston North	Conservative	2010 (Note: Wallace was formerly the MP for Lancaster and Wyre since 2005 until the constituency was abolished.)	15,844	30.9
David Watts	St Helens North	Labour	1997	13,101	29.4
John Woodcock	Barrow and Furness	Labour Co-op	2010	5,208	11.8
Shaun Woodward	St Helens South and Whiston	Labour	2010 (Note: Woodward was formerly the MP for St Helens South since 2001 until the constituency was abolished, and previously served as MP for Witney from 1997 to 2001.)	14,122	30.7
Phil Woolas	Oldham East and Saddleworth	Labour	1997	103	0.3

== MPs in the South East region ==
Affiliation	Members
Conservative	74
Labour	4
Liberal Democrats	3
Green Party	1
Independent	1
Speaker	1
Total	84

MP	Constituency	Party	In constituency since	Majority	Majority (%)
Adam Afriyie	Windsor	Conservative	2005	19,054	38.4
James Arbuthnot	North East Hampshire	Conservative	1997 (Note: Arbuthnot was formerly the MP for Wanstead and Woodford since 1987 until the constituency was abolished.)	18,597	35.1
Norman Baker	Lewes	Liberal Democrats	1997	7,647	15.3
Steve Baker	Wycombe	Conservative	2010	9,560	19.9
Tony Baldry	Banbury	Conservative	1983	18,227	32.4
Greg Barker	Bexhill and Battle	Conservative	2001	12,880	23.6
Richard Benyon	Newbury	Conservative	2005	12,248	20.9
John Bercow	Buckingham	Speaker	1997	12,529	25.9
Paul Beresford	Mole Valley	Conservative	1997 (Note: Beresford previously served as MP for Croydon Central from 1992 to 1997.)	15,653	28.8
Nicola Blackwood	Oxford West and Abingdon	Conservative	2010	176	0.3
Crispin Blunt	Reigate	Conservative	1997	13,591	27.2
Peter Bottomley	Worthing West	Conservative	1997 (Note: Bottomley previously served as MP for Eltham from 1983 to 1997, and formerly Woolwich West from a 1975 by-election until the constituency was abolished.)	11,729	23.8
Julian Brazier	Canterbury	Conservative	1987	6,048	12.3
Steve Brine	Winchester	Conservative	2010	3,048	5.4
David Cameron	Witney	Conservative	2001	22,740	39.4
Rehman Chishti	Gillingham and Rainham	Conservative	2010	8,680	18.5
Greg Clark	Tunbridge Wells	Conservative	2005	15,576	30.9
Damian Collins	Folkestone and Hythe	Conservative	2010	10,122	19.1
Tracey Crouch	Chatham and Aylesford	Conservative	2010	6,069	13.9
John Denham	Southampton Itchen	Labour	1992	192	0.5
Caroline Dinenage	Gosport	Conservative	2010	14,413	30.7
Charlie Elphicke	Dover	Conservative	2010	5,274	10.5
Michael Fallon	Sevenoaks	Conservative	1997 (Note: Fallon previously served as MP for Darlington from 1983 to 1992.)	17,515	35.4
Roger Gale	North Thanet	Conservative	1983	13,528	31.2
Nick Gibb	Bognor Regis and Littlehampton	Conservative	1997	13,063	27.9
Cheryl Gillan	Chesham and Amersham	Conservative	1992	16,710	31.9
Michael Gove	Surrey Heath	Conservative	2005	17,289	31.8
Helen Grant	Maidstone and The Weald	Conservative	2010	5,889	12.9
Chris Grayling	Epsom and Ewell	Conservative	2001	16,134	29.4
Damian Green	Ashford	Conservative	1997	17,297	31.3
Dominic Grieve	Beaconsfield	Conservative	1997	21,782	41.5
Sam Gyimah	East Surrey	Conservative	2010	16,874	30.8
Philip Hammond	Runnymede and Weybridge	Conservative	1997	16,509	34.3
Mike Hancock	Portsmouth South	Independent (Note: Hancock was suspended from the Liberal Democrats in January 2014. He resigned from the party in June 2014 and sat as an independent.)	1997 (Note: Hancock previously served the constituency as MP from a 1984 by-election to 1987.)	11,093	30.0
Gordon Henderson	Sittingbourne and Sheppey	Conservative	2010	12,383	25.4
Charles Hendry	Wealden	Conservative	2001 (Note: Hendry previously served as MP for High Peak from 1992 to 1997.)	17,179	31.3
Nick Herbert	Arundel and South Downs	Conservative	2005	16,691	29.9
Damian Hinds	East Hampshire	Conservative	2010	13,467	26.3
Mark Hoban	Fareham	Conservative	2001	17,092	31.5
George Hollingbery	Meon Valley	Conservative	2010	12,125	23.6
Adam Holloway	Gravesham	Conservative	2005	9,312	19.7
Gerald Howarth	Aldershot	Conservative	1997 (Note: Howarth previously served as MP for Cannock and Burntwood from 1983 to 1992.)	5,586	12.3
John Howell	Henley	Conservative	2008	16,588	31.0
Chris Huhne	Eastleigh	Liberal Democrats	2005	3,864	7.2
Jeremy Hunt	South West Surrey	Conservative	2005	16,318	28.5
Gareth Johnson	Dartford	Conservative	2010	6,069	21.2
Simon Kirby	Brighton Kemptown	Conservative	2010	1,328	3.1
Kwasi Kwarteng	Spelthorne	Conservative	2010	10,019	21.2
Mark Lancaster	Milton Keynes North	Conservative	2010 (Note: Lancaster was formerly the MP for North East Milton Keynes since 2005 until the constituency was abolished.)	8,961	16.7
Phillip Lee	Bracknell	Conservative	2010	15,704	30.1
Julian Lewis	New Forest East	Conservative	1997	11,307	22.6
David Lidington	Aylesbury	Conservative	1992	12,618	23.8
Stephen Lloyd	Eastbourne	Liberal Democrats	2010	3,435	6.6
Jonathan Lord	Woking	Conservative	2010	6,807	12.9
Tim Loughton	East Worthing and Shoreham	Conservative	1997	11,105	23.0
Caroline Lucas	Brighton Pavilion	Green	2010	1,252	2.4
Fiona Mactaggart	Slough	Labour	1997	5,523	11.5
Francis Maude	Horsham	Conservative	1997 (Note: Maude previously served as MP for North Warwickshire from 1983 to 1992.)	11,460	20.5
Theresa May	Maidenhead	Conservative	1997	16,769	31.3
Maria Miller	Basingstoke	Conservative	2005	13,176	26.0
Anne Milton	Guildford	Conservative	2005	7,782	14.0
Penny Mordaunt	Portsmouth North	Conservative	2010	7,289	16.5
Caroline Nokes	Romsey and Southampton North	Conservative	2010	4,156	8.4
Dominic Raab	Esher and Walton	Conservative	2010	18,593	34.1
Mark Reckless	Rochester and Strood	UKIP	2014 by-election (Note: Reckless was previously elected as a Conservative in 2010, defected and subsequently resigned as an MP, triggering by-election which he won as a UKIP candidate.)	2,920	7.3
John Redwood	Wokingham	Conservative	1987	13,492	24.7
Hugh Robertson	Faversham and Mid Kent	Conservative	2001	17,088	36.6
Amber Rudd	Hastings and Rye	Conservative	2010	1,993	4.0
Laura Sandys	South Thanet	Conservative	2010	7,617	15.4
Alok Sharma	Reading West	Conservative	2010	6,004	12.6
Andrew Smith	Oxford East	Labour	1987	4,581	8.9
Henry Smith	Crawley	Conservative	2010	5,928	12.5
Nicholas Soames	Mid Sussex	Conservative	1997 (Note: Soames previously served as MP for Crawley from 1983 to 1997.)	7,402	13.2
John Stanley	Tonbridge and Malling	Conservative	1974	18,178	35.4
Iain Stewart	Milton Keynes South	Conservative	2010	5,201	9.4
Desmond Swayne	New Forest West	Conservative	1997	16,896	35.5
Mike Thornton	Eastleigh	Liberal Democrats	2013 by-election	1,771	4.3
Andrew Turner	Isle of Wight	Conservative	2001	10,527	15.0
Andrew Tyrie	Chichester	Conservative	1997	15,877	27.9
Ed Vaizey	Wantage	Conservative	2005	13,547	24.1
Mike Weatherley	Hove	Conservative	2010	1,868	3.7
Alan Whitehead	Southampton Test	Labour	1997	2,413	5.5
David Willetts	Havant	Conservative	1992	12,160	27.7
Rob Wilson	Reading East	Conservative	2005	7,605	15.3
George Young	North West Hampshire	Conservative	1997 (Note: Young was formerly the MP for Ealing Acton since 1983 until the constituency was abolished, and Acton from February 1974 until its abolition in 1983.)	18,583	34.9

== MPs in the South West region ==
Affiliation	Members
Conservative	36
Liberal Democrats	15
Labour	4
Total	55

MP	Constituency	Party	In constituency since	Majority	Majority (%)
Ben Bradshaw	Exeter	Labour	1997	2,721	5.2
Annette Brooke	Mid Dorset and North Poole	Liberal Democrats	2001	269	0.6
Jeremy Browne	Taunton Deane	Liberal Democrats	2010 (Note: Browne was formerly the MP for Taunton since 2005 until the constituency was abolished.)	3,993	6.9
Robert Buckland	South Swindon	Conservative	2010	3,544	7.5
Conor Burns	Bournemouth West	Conservative	2010	5,583	13.4
Neil Carmichael	Stroud	Conservative	2010	1,299	2.2
Christopher Chope	Christchurch	Conservative	1997 (Note: Chope previously served as MP for Southampton Itchen from 1983 to 1992.)	15,410	31.1
Geoffrey Clifton-Brown	The Cotswolds	Conservative	1997 (Note: Clifton-Brown was formerly the MP for Cirencester and Tewkesbury since 1992 until the constituency was abolished.)	12,864	23.5
Oliver Colvile	Plymouth Sutton and Devonport	Conservative	2010	1,149	2.6
Geoffrey Cox	Torridge and West Devon	Conservative	2005	2,957	5.4
Richard Drax	South Dorset	Conservative	2010	7,443	14.8
Tobias Ellwood	Bournemouth East	Conservative	2005	7,728	17.5
George Eustice	Camborne and Redruth	Conservative	2010	66	0.2
Don Foster	Bath	Liberal Democrats	1992	11,883	25.2
Liam Fox	North Somerset	Conservative	2010 (Note: Fox was formerly the MP for Woodspring since 1992 until the constituency was abolished.)	7,862	13.6
Andrew George	St Ives	Liberal Democrats	1997	1,719	3.7
Steve Gilbert	St Austell and Newquay	Liberal Democrats	2010	1,312	2.7
John Glen	Salisbury	Conservative	2010	5,966	12.3
Richard Graham	Gloucester	Conservative	2010	2,420	4.7
James Gray	North Wiltshire	Conservative	1997	7,483	15.4
Duncan Hames	Chippenham	Liberal Democrats	2010	2,470	4.8
Mark Harper	Forest of Dean	Conservative	2005	11,064	22.7
Nick Harvey	North Devon	Liberal Democrats	1992	5,821	11.4
David Heath	Somerton and Frome	Liberal Democrats	1997	1,817	3.0
Martin Horwood	Cheltenham	Liberal Democrats	2005	4,920	9.3
David Laws	Yeovil	Liberal Democrats	2001	13,036	22.8
Charlotte Leslie	Bristol North West	Conservative	2010	3,274	6.5
Oliver Letwin	West Dorset	Conservative	1997	3,923	6.9
Ian Liddell-Grainger	Bridgwater and West Somerset	Conservative	2010 (Note: Liddell-Grainger was formerly the MP for Bridgwater since 2001 until the constituency was abolished.)	9,249	17.0
Jack Lopresti	Filton and Bradley Stoke	Conservative	2010	6,914	14.3
Kerry McCarthy	Bristol East	Labour	2005	3,722	8.3
Anne Marie Morris	Newton Abbot	Conservative	2010	523	1.1
Tessa Munt	Wells	Liberal Democrats	2010	800	1.5
Sheryll Murray	South East Cornwall	Conservative	2010	3,220	6.5
Andrew Murrison	South West Wiltshire	Conservative	2010 (Note: Murrison was formerly the MP for Westbury since 2001 until the constituency was abolished.)	10,367	21.2
Sarah Newton	Truro and Falmouth	Conservative	2010	435	0.9
Neil Parish	Tiverton and Honiton	Conservative	2010	9,320	17.0
John Penrose	Weston-super-Mare	Conservative	2005	2,691	5.1
Claire Perry	Devizes	Conservative	2010	13,005	28.1
Dawn Primarolo	Bristol South	Labour	1987	4,734	9.7
Jacob Rees-Mogg	North East Somerset	Conservative	2010	4,914	9.6
Laurence Robertson	Tewkesbury	Conservative	1997	6,310	11.7
Dan Rogerson	North Cornwall	Liberal Democrats	2005	2,981	6.4
Adrian Sanders	Torbay	Liberal Democrats	1997	4,078	8.3
Alison Seabeck	Plymouth Moor View	Labour	2010 (Note: Seabeck was formerly the MP for Plymouth Devonport since 2005 until the constituency was abolished.)	1,588	3.9
Chris Skidmore	Kingswood	Conservative	2010	2,445	5.1
Gary Streeter	South West Devon	Conservative	1997	15,874	31.9
Mel Stride	Central Devon	Conservative	2010	9,230	17.1
Hugo Swire	East Devon	Conservative	2001	9,114	17.1
Robert Syms	Poole	Conservative	1997	7,541	15.9
Justin Tomlinson	North Swindon	Conservative	2010	7,060	14.1
Robert Walter	North Dorset	Conservative	1997	7,625	14.1
Steve Webb	Thornbury and Yate	Liberal Democrats	2010 (Note: Webb was formerly the MP for Northavon since 1997 until the constituency was abolished.)	7,116	14.7
Stephen Williams	Bristol West	Liberal Democrats	2005	11,366	20.5
Sarah Wollaston	Totnes	Conservative	2010	4,927	10.3

== MPs in the West Midlands region ==
Affiliation	Members
Conservative	33
Labour	24
Liberal Democrats	2
Total	59

MP	Constituency	Party	In constituency since	Majority	Majority (%)
Bob Ainsworth	Coventry North East	Labour	1992	11,775	27.2
Ian Austin	Dudley North	Labour	2005	649	1.7
Harriett Baldwin	West Worcestershire	Conservative	2010	6,754	12.7
Karen Bradley	Staffordshire Moorlands	Conservative	2010	6,689	15.3
Aidan Burley	Cannock Chase	Conservative	2010	3,195	7.0
Richard Burden	Birmingham Northfield	Labour	1992	2,782	6.7
Lorely Burt	Solihull	Liberal Democrats	2005	175	0.3
Dan Byles	North Warwickshire	Conservative	2010	54	0.1
Liam Byrne	Birmingham Hodge Hill	Labour	2004	10,302	24.3
Bill Cash	Stone	Conservative	1997 (Note: Cash previously served as MP for Stafford from 1992 to 1997.)	13,292	28.2
Jim Cunningham	Coventry South	Labour	1997 (Note: Cunningham was formerly the MP for Coventry South East since 1992 until the constituency was abolished.)	3,845	8.4
Jack Dromey	Birmingham Erdington	Labour	2010	3,277	9.2
Philip Dunne	Ludlow	Conservative	2005	9,749	20.0
Michael Fabricant	Lichfield	Conservative	1997 (Note: Fabricant was formerly the MP for Mid Staffordshire since 1992 until the constituency was abolished.)	17,683	34.3
Paul Farrelly	Newcastle-under-Lyme	Labour	2001	1,552	3.6
Rob Flello	Stoke-on-Trent South	Labour	2005	4,130	10.4
Mark Garnier	Wyre Forest	Conservative	2010	2,643	5.2
Roger Godsiff	Birmingham Hall Green	Labour	2010 (Note: Godsiff was formerly the MP for Birmingham Sparkbrook and Small Heath since 1997 until the constituency was abolished, and Birmingham Small Heath from 1992 until its abolition in 1997.)	3,799	7.8
Andrew Griffiths	Burton	Conservative	2010	6,304	12.6
John Hemming	Birmingham Yardley	Liberal Democrats	2005	3,002	7.4
Tristram Hunt	Stoke-on-Trent Central	Labour	2010	5,566	17.1
Margot James	Stourbridge	Conservative	2010	5,164	11.0
Sajid Javid	Bromsgrove	Conservative	2010	11,308	21.9
Marcus Jones	Nuneaton	Conservative	2010	2,069	4.6
Daniel Kawczynski	Shrewsbury and Atcham	Conservative	2005	7,944	15.0
Chris Kelly	Dudley South	Conservative	2010	3,856	10.1
Jeremy Lefroy	Stafford	Conservative	2010	5,460	10.9
Peter Luff	Mid Worcestershire	Conservative	1997 (Note: Luff previously served as MP for Worcester from 1992 to 1997.)	15,864	31.1
Karen Lumley	Redditch	Conservative	2010	5,821	13.2
Khalid Mahmood	Birmingham Perry Barr	Labour	2001	11,908	28.3
Shabana Mahmood	Birmingham Ladywood	Labour	2010	10,105	28.2
Steve McCabe	Birmingham Selly Oak	Labour	2010 (Note: McCabe previously served as MP for Birmingham Hall Green from 1997 to 2010.)	3,482	7.4
Andrew Mitchell	Sutton Coldfield	Conservative	2001 (Note: Mitchell previously served as MP for Gedling from 1987 to 1997.)	17,005	33.6
Jesse Norman	Hereford and South Herefordshire	Conservative	2010	2,481	5.1
Owen Paterson	North Shropshire	Conservative	1997	15,828	30.6
Mark Pawsey	Rugby	Conservative	2010	6,000	12.6
Chris Pincher	Tamworth	Conservative	2010	6,090	13.1
Mark Pritchard	The Wrekin	Conservative	2005	9,450	20.6
Geoffrey Robinson	Coventry North West	Labour	1976	6,288	13.5
Richard Shepherd	Aldridge-Brownhills	Conservative	1979	15,256	39.5
Caroline Spelman	Meriden	Conservative	1997	16,253	31.2
Gisela Stuart	Birmingham Edgbaston	Labour	1997	1,274	3.0
Robin Walker	Worcester	Conservative	2010	2,982	6.1
Joan Walley	Stoke-on-Trent North	Labour	1987	8,235	20.5
Chris White	Warwick and Leamington	Conservative	2010	3,513	7.2
Bill Wiggin	North Herefordshire	Conservative	2010 (Note: Wiggin was formerly the MP for Leominster since 2001 until the constituency was abolished.)	9,887	20.8
Gavin Williamson	South Staffordshire	Conservative	2010	16,590	32.9
David Wright	Telford	Labour	2001	978	2.4
Jeremy Wright	Kenilworth and Southam	Conservative	2010 (Note: Wright was formerly the MP for Rugby and Kenilworth since 2005 until the constituency was abolished.)	12,552	25.9
Nadhim Zahawi	Stratford-on-Avon	Conservative	2010	11,346	22.4

== MPs in the Yorkshire and the Humber region ==
Affiliation	Members
Labour	31
Conservative	19
Liberal Democrats	3
Respect Party	1
Total	54

MP	Constituency	Party	In constituency since	Majority	Majority (%)
Nigel Adams	Selby and Ainsty	Conservative	2010	12,265	23.7
Stuart Andrew	Pudsey	Conservative	2010	1,659	3.4
Ed Balls	Morley and Outwood	Labour Co-op	2010 (Note: Balls was formerly the MP for Normanton from 2005 until the constituency was abolished.)	1,101	2.3
Kevin Barron	Rother Valley	Labour	1983	5,866	12.5
Hugh Bayley	York Central	Conservative	2010 (Note: McIntosh was formerly the MP for York/City of York from 1992 until the constituency was abolished.)	6,451	13.9
Hilary Benn	Leeds Central	Labour	1999	10,645	28.5
Clive Betts	Sheffield South East	Labour	2010 (Note: Betts was formerly the MP for Sheffield Attercliffe from 1992 until the constituency was abolished.)	10,505	25.4
Paul Blomfield	Sheffield Central	Labour	2010	165	0.4
David Blunkett	Sheffield Brightside and Hillsborough	Labour	2010 (Note: Betts was formerly the MP for Sheffield Brightside from 1987 until the constituency was abolished.)	13,632	35.0
Sarah Champion	Rotherham	Labour	2012 by-election	5,318	24.5
Nick Clegg	Sheffield Hallam	Liberal Democrats	2005	15,284	29.9
Yvette Cooper	Normanton, Pontefract and Castleford	Labour	2010 (Note: Cooper was formerly the MP for Pontefract and Castleford from 1997 until the constituency was abolished.)	10,979	23.7
Mary Creagh	Wakefield	Labour	2005	5,154	11.8
Nic Dakin	Scunthorpe	Labour	2010	2,549	6.9
Philip Davies	Shipley	Conservative	2005	9,944	20.1
David Davis	Haltemprice and Howden	Conservative	1997 (Note: Davis was formerly the MP for Boothferry from 1987 until the constituency was abolished.)	11,602	23.8
Michael Dugher	Barnsley East	Labour	2010	11,090	28.9
Caroline Flint	Don Valley	Labour	1997	3,595	8.2
George Galloway	Bradford West	Respect	2012 by-election	10,140	30.9
Robert Goodwill	Scarborough and Whitby	Conservative	2005	1,245	2.6
William Hague	Richmond (Yorks)	Conservative	1989	23,336	43.7
Fabian Hamilton	Leeds North East	Labour	1997	4,545	9.6
John Healey	Wentworth and Dearne	Labour	2010 (Note: Healey was formerly the MP for Wentworth from 1997 until the constituency was abolished.)	13,920	33.0
Kris Hopkins	Keighley	Conservative	2010	2,940	6.1
Eric Illsley	Barnsley Central	Independent (Note: Illsley was suspended from Labour on 19 May 2010 and sat as an independent until his resignation from Parliament in February 2011.)	1987	11,093	30.0
Dan Jarvis	Barnsley Central	Labour	2011 by-election	11,771	48.6
Alan Johnson	Kingston upon Hull West and Hessle	Labour	1997	5,742	18.3
Diana Johnson	Kingston upon Hull North	Labour	2005	641	1.9
Andrew Jones	Harrogate and Knaresborough	Conservative	2010	1,039	1.9
Greg Knight	East Yorkshire	Conservative	2001 (Note: Knight previously served as MP for Derby North from 1983 to 1997.)	13,486	26.3
Denis MacShane	Rotherham	Labour	1994	10,462	27.9
Jason McCartney	Colne Valley	Conservative	2010	4,837	8.8
Anne McIntosh	Thirsk and Malton	Conservative	2010 (Note: McIntosh was formerly the MP for Vale of York from 1997 until the constituency was abolished.)	11,281	29.6
Ed Miliband	Doncaster North	Labour	2005	10,909	26.3
Austin Mitchell	Great Grimsby	Labour	1977	714	2.2
George Mudie	Leeds East	Labour	1992	10,293	27.2
Greg Mulholland	Leeds North West	Liberal Democrats	2005	9,103	20.9
Meg Munn	Sheffield Heeley	Labour	2005	5,807	14.2
Andrew Percy	Brigg and Goole	Conservative	2010	5,147	11.8
Simon Reevell	Dewsbury	Conservative	2010	1,526	2.8
Rachel Reeves	Leeds West	Labour	2010	7,016	18.1
Linda Riordan	Halifax	Labour Co-op	2005	1,472	3.4
Barry Sheerman	Huddersfield	Labour Co-op	1983 (Note: Sheerman was formerly the MP for Huddersfield East from 1979 until the constituency was abolished.)	4,472	11.0
Alec Shelbrooke	Elmet and Rothwell	Conservative	2010	4,521	8.1
Marsha Singh	Bradford West	Labour	1997	5,763	14.2
Angela Smith	Penistone and Stocksbridge	Labour	2010 (Note: Smith was formerly the MP for Sheffield Hillsborough from 2005 until the constituency was abolished.)	3,049	6.6
Julian Smith	Skipton and Ripon	Conservative	2010	9,950	18.2
Graham Stuart	Beverley and Holderness	Conservative	2005	12,987	24.4
Julian Sturdy	York Outer	Conservative	2010	3,688	6.9
Gerry Sutcliffe	Bradford South	Labour	1994	4,622	12.2
Jon Trickett	Hemsworth	Labour	1996	9,844	22.5
Karl Turner	Kingston upon Hull East	Labour	2010	8,597	25.1
Martin Vickers	Cleethorpes	Conservative	2010	4,298	9.5
David Ward	Bradford East	Liberal Democrats	2010	365	0.9
Craig Whittaker	Calder Valley	Conservative	2010	6,431	12.4
Rosie Winterton	Doncaster Central	Labour	1997	6,229	14.9
Mike Wood	Batley and Spen	Labour	1997	6,141	13.0

== By-elections ==
- 2011 Oldham East and Saddleworth by-election
- 2011 Barnsley Central by-election
- 2011 Leicester South by-election
- 2011 Feltham and Heston by-election
- 2012 Bradford West by-election
- 2012 Manchester Central by-election
- 2012 Corby by-election
- 2012 Rotherham by-election
- 2012 Middlesbrough by-election
- 2012 Croydon North by-election
- 2013 Eastleigh by-election
- 2013 South Shields by-election
- 2014 Wythenshawe and Sale East by-election
- 2014 Newark by-election
- 2014 Clacton by-election
- 2014 Rochester and Strood by-election

== See also ==
- 2010 United Kingdom general election
- List of MPs elected in the 2010 United Kingdom general election
- List of MPs for constituencies in Northern Ireland 2010–15
- List of MPs for constituencies in Scotland 2010–15
- List of MPs for constituencies in Wales 2010–15
- Category:UK MPs 2010–2015
