= List of MPs for constituencies in Wales (2010–2015) =

- Colours on map indicate the party allegiance of each constituency's MP.

This is a list of members of Parliament (MPs) elected to the House of Commons of the United Kingdom by Welsh constituencies for the Fifty-Fifth Parliament of the United Kingdom (2010 to 2015).

It includes both MPs elected at the 2010 general election, held on 6 May 2010, and those subsequently elected in by-elections.

The list is sorted by the name of the MP, and MPs who did not serve throughout the Parliament are italicised. New MPs elected since the general election are noted at the bottom of the page.

== Composition before 2015 election ==
Affiliation	Members
Labour Party	26
Conservative Party	8
Liberal Democrats	3
Plaid Cymru	3
Total	40

== MPs ==
MP	Constituency	Party	In constituency since
Guto Bebb	Aberconwy	Conservative Party	2010
Kevin Brennan	Cardiff West	Labour Party	2001
Chris Bryant	Rhondda	Labour Party	2001
Alun Cairns	Vale of Glamorgan	Conservative Party	2010
Martin Caton	Gower	Labour Party	1997
Ann Clwyd	Cynon Valley	Labour Party	1984 by-election
Stephen Crabb	Preseli Pembrokeshire	Conservative Party	2005
Wayne David	Caerphilly	Labour Party	2001
David Davies	Monmouth	Conservative Party	2005
Geraint Davies	Swansea West	Labour/Co-operative	2010
Glyn Davies	Montgomeryshire	Conservative Party	2010
Stephen Doughty	Cardiff South and Penarth	Labour/Co-operative	2012 by-election
Jonathan Edwards	Carmarthen East and Dinefwr	Plaid Cymru	2010
Chris Evans	Islwyn	Labour/Co-operative	2010
Jonathan Evans	Cardiff North	Conservative Party	2010
Paul Flynn	Newport West	Labour Party	1987
Hywel Francis	Aberavon	Labour Party	2001
Nia Griffith	Llanelli	Labour Party	2005
Peter Hain	Neath	Labour Party	1991 by-election
David Hanson	Delyn	Labour Party	1992
Simon Hart	Carmarthen West and Pembrokeshire South	Conservative Party	2010
Dai Havard	Merthyr Tydfil and Rhymney	Labour Party	2001
Huw Irranca-Davies	Ogmore	Labour Party	2002 by-election
Siân James	Swansea East	Labour Party	2005
David Jones	Clwyd West	Conservative Party	2005
Susan Jones	Clwyd South	Labour Party	2010
Elfyn Llwyd	Dwyfor Meirionnydd	Plaid Cymru	2010
Ian Lucas	Wrexham	Labour Party	2001
Madeleine Moon	Bridgend	Labour Party	2005
Jessica Morden	Newport East	Labour Party	2005
Paul Murphy	Torfaen	Labour Party	1987
Albert Owen	Ynys Môn	Labour Party	2001
Chris Ruane	Vale of Clwyd	Labour Party	1997
Nick Smith	Blaenau Gwent	Labour Party	2010
Owen Smith	Pontypridd	Labour Party	2010
Mark Tami	Alyn and Deeside	Labour Party	2001
Hywel Williams	Arfon	Plaid Cymru	2001
Mark Williams	Ceredigion	Liberal Democrats	2005
Roger Williams	Brecon and Radnorshire	Liberal Democrats	2001
Jenny Willott	Cardiff Central	Liberal Democrats	2005

== By-elections ==
- 2012 Cardiff South and Penarth by-election

== See also ==
- 2010 United Kingdom general election
- List of MPs elected in the 2010 United Kingdom general election
- List of MPs for constituencies in England (2010–2015)
- List of MPs for constituencies in Northern Ireland (2010–2015)
- List of MPs for constituencies in Scotland (2010–2015)
