= List of MPs elected in the 2010 United Kingdom general election =

2010–2015 Parliament of the United Kingdom
| ← | 2005–2010 Parliament | 2015–2017 Parliament | → |
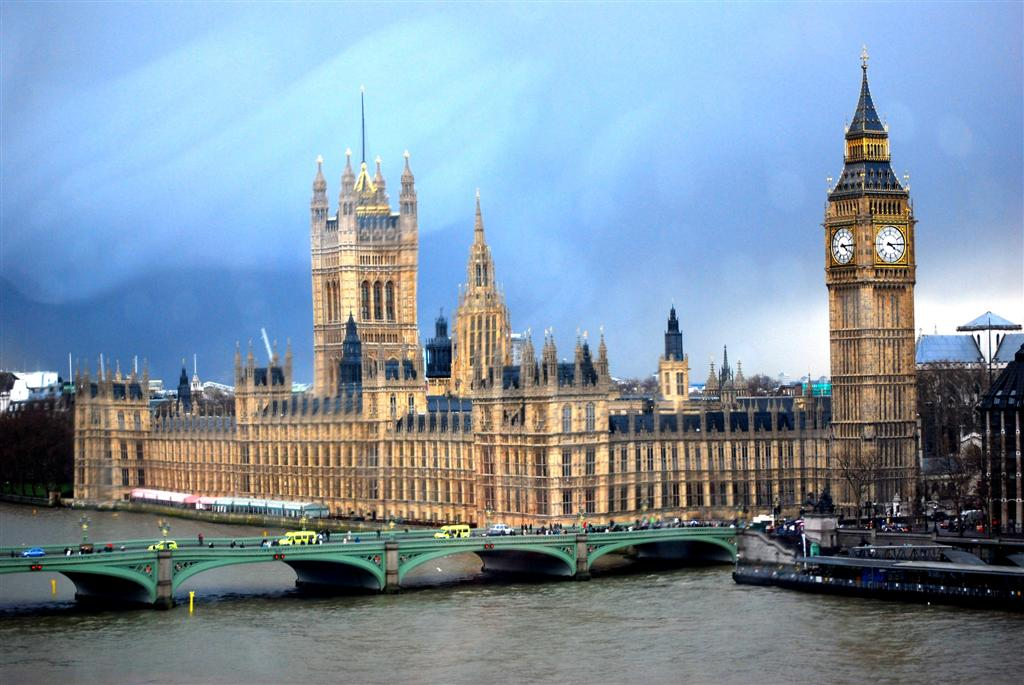
- Palace of Westminster in 2010

Overview
- Legislative body: Parliament of the United Kingdom
- Term: 18 May 2010 – 30 March 2015
- Election: 2010 United Kingdom general election
- Government: Cameron–Clegg coalition

House of Commons
- Members: 650
- Speaker: John Bercow
- Leader: William Hague — Andrew Lansley – until reshuffle in 2014 — Sir George Young, Bt – until 4 September 2012
- Prime Minister: David Cameron
- Leader of the Opposition: Ed Miliband — Harriet Harman – acting until 25 September 2010
- Third-party leader: Nick Clegg – as Deputy Prime Minister

House of Lords
- Members: 782
- Lord Speaker: Baroness D'Souza — Baroness Hayman – until 31 August 2011
- Leader: Baroness Stowell of Beeston — Lord Hill of Oareford – until 15 July 2014 — Lord Strathclyde – until 7 January 2013
- Leader of the Opposition: Baroness Royall of Blaisdon
- Third-party leader: Lord Wallace of Tankerness — Lord McNally – until 15 October 2013
- Crown-in-Parliament: Elizabeth II

Sessions
- 1st: 25 May 2010 – 1 May 2012
- 2nd: 9 May 2012 – 25 April 2013
- 3rd: 8 May 2013 – 14 May 2014
- 4th: 4 June 2014 – 26 March 2015

The 2010 United Kingdom general election took place on 6 May 2010 and saw each of Parliament's 650 constituencies return one Member of Parliament (MP) to the House of Commons. Parliament, which consists of the House of Lords and the elected House of Commons, was convened on 25 May at the Palace of Westminster by Queen Elizabeth II. It was dissolved at the beginning of 30 March 2015, being 25 working days ahead of the 2015 general election on 7 May 2015.

The Conservative Party, led by David Cameron, became the single largest party, though without an overall majority. This resulted in a hung parliament. A coalition agreement was then formed following negotiations with the Liberal Democrats and their leader Nick Clegg. John Bercow resumed his role as Speaker of the House of Commons. In September 2010, Ed Miliband won a Labour Party leadership vote to succeed Gordon Brown as permanent Leader of the Opposition.

In the House of Lords, Baroness Hayman (formerly a Labour member) resumed her role as Lord Speaker until the end of her five-year term in 2011, after which she did not seek re-election in the house. Peers elected former Crossbencher Baroness D'Souza to replace her. From the start of this Parliament the Lords were "led" by Lord Strathclyde without an absolute majority on his Conservative benches. In January 2013 he stood down and was succeeded by Lord Hill of Oareford.

Notable newcomers elected in this general election included Liz Truss, Liz Kendall, Guto Bebb, Gloria De Piero, Sajid Javid, Michael Dugher, Amber Rudd, Lisa Nandy, Damian Hinds, Anna Soubry, Heidi Alexander, Jacob Rees-Mogg, Alison McGovern, Chris Williamson, Owen Smith, Nicky Morgan, Tristram Hunt, Dan Poulter, Esther McVey, Priti Patel, Luciana Berger, Karen Bradley, Chuka Umunna, Louise Mensch, Dominic Raab, Tracey Crouch, Valerie Vaz and Caroline Lucas.

During the 2010–15 Parliament, John Bercow was the Speaker, David Cameron served as Prime Minister, and Harriet Harman and Ed Miliband served as Leader of the Opposition.

== House of Commons composition (2010 and 2015) ==
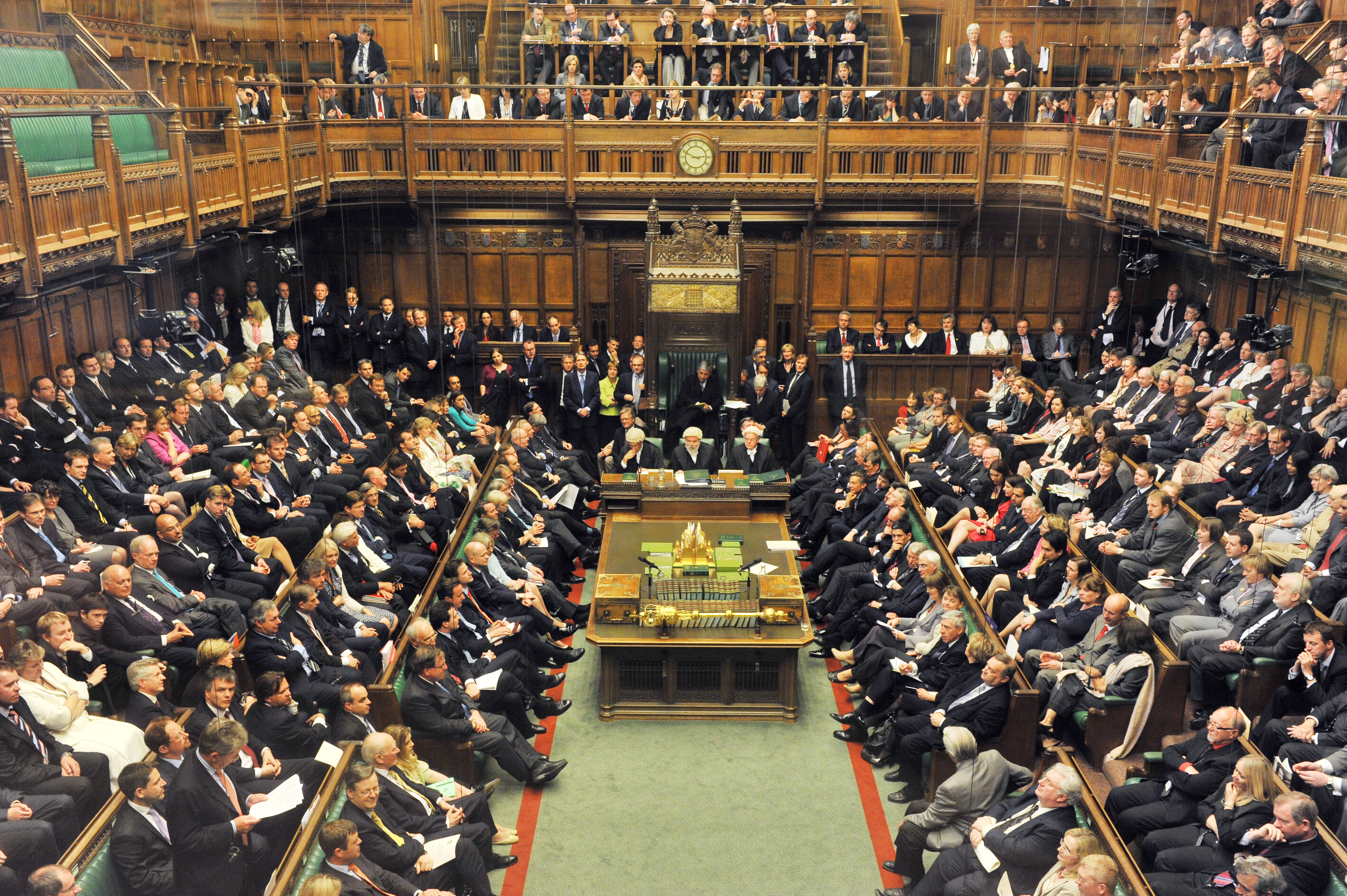
The Commons chamber during the Queen's Speech debate on 25 May 2010, as Liberal Democrat MP Don Foster seconds the loyal address.

These are graphical representations of the House of Commons showing a comparison of party strengths as it was directly after the 2010 general election and before the 2015 general election:

This table shows the number of MPs in each party:

| Affiliation | Members | |
| Affiliation | After 2010 general election | At dissolution of Parliament |
|---|---|---|
| Conservative | 306 | 302 |
| Labour | 258 | 256 |
| Liberal Democrats | 57 | 56 |
| DUP | 8 | 8 |
| SNP | 6 | 6 |
| Sinn Féin | 5 | 5 |
| Independent | 0 | 4 |
| Plaid Cymru | 3 | 3 |
| SDLP | 3 | 3 |
| UKIP | 0 | 2 |
| Green | 1 | 1 |
| Alliance | 1 | 1 |
| Ind. Unionist | 1 | 1 |
| Respect | 0 | 1 |
| Speaker | 1 | 1 |
| Total number of seats | 650 | 650 |
| Actual government majority | 83 | 73 |

Notes:

1. The Scottish National Party and Plaid Cymru sat together as a party group.
2. Sinn Féin did not take its seats.
3. This is not the official seating plan of the House of Commons, which has five rows of benches on each side, with the government party to the right of the speaker and opposition parties to the left, but with room for only around two-thirds of MPs to sit at any one time.
4. In addition to the parties listed in the table above, the Co-operative Party was also represented in the House of Commons by Labour MPs sitting with the Labour Co-operative designation. The number of these MPs was 28 after the general election, and was 31 at dissolution.

== List of MPs elected in the general election ==
The following table is a list of MPs elected, ordered by constituency. As the constituency boundaries changed for this election, the "notional incumbent" column lists the party estimated to have won the seat at the 2005 election, had that election been conducted under the new boundaries.

Names of incumbents are listed where they stood for re-election; for details of defeated new candidates and the incumbent who stood down in those cases see individual constituency articles.

Table of contents:

A B C D E F G H I J K L M N O P Q R S T U V W X Y Z Changes

== A ==
| Constituency | Party of notional incumbent before election | | Member returned (2010) | | Notes |
| Aberavon | | Labour | | Hywel Francis (L) | |
| Aberconwy | | Labour | | Guto Bebb (C) | Gain. MP for predecessor seat of Conwy, Betty Williams, did not stand. |
| Aberdeen North | | Labour | | Frank Doran (L) | |
| Aberdeen South | | Labour | | Anne Begg (L) | |
| Airdrie and Shotts | | Labour | | Pamela Nash (L) | Previous incumbent John Reid did not stand. |
| Aldershot | | Conservative | | Gerald Howarth (C) | |
| Aldridge-Brownhills | | Conservative | | Richard Shepherd (C) | |
| Altrincham and Sale West | | Conservative | | Graham Brady (C) | |
| Alyn and Deeside | | Labour | | Mark Tami (L) | |
| Amber Valley | | Labour | | Nigel Mills (C) | Gain. Defeated incumbent Judy Mallaber. |
| Angus | | SNP | | Mike Weir (SNP) | |
| Arfon | | Labour | | Hywel Williams (PC) | MP for predecessor seat of Caernarfon. |
| Argyll and Bute | | Liberal Democrats | | Alan Reid (LD) | |
| Arundel and South Downs | | Conservative | | Nick Herbert (C) | |
| Ashfield | | Labour | | Gloria De Piero (L) | Previous incumbent Geoff Hoon did not stand. |
| Ashford | | Conservative | | Damian Green (C) | |
| Ashton-under-Lyne | | Labour | | David Heyes (L) | |
| Aylesbury | | Conservative | | David Lidington (C) | |
| Ayr, Carrick and Cumnock | | Labour | | Sandra Osborne (L) | |
== B ==
| Constituency | Elected MP | Elected party | Previous MP | Previous party | |
| Banbury | | Conservative | | Tony Baldry (C) | |
| Banff and Buchan | | SNP | | Eilidh Whiteford (SNP) | Previous incumbent Alex Salmond did not stand. |
| Barking | | Labour | | Margaret Hodge (L) | |
| Barnsley Central | | Labour | | Eric Illsley (L) | Illsley was suspended from his party and had the whip withdrawn on 19 May after he was charged with false accounting over the United Kingdom Parliamentary expenses scandal. By-election in 2011, see below. |
| Barnsley East | | Labour | | Michael Dugher (L) | MP for predecessor seat of Barnsley East and Mexborough, Jeffrey Ennis, did not stand. |
| Barrow and Furness | | Labour | | John Woodcock (L Co-op) | Previous incumbent John Hutton did not stand. |
| Basildon and Billericay | | Conservative | | John Baron (C) | MP for predecessor seat of Billericay. |
| Basingstoke | | Conservative | | Maria Miller (C) | |
| Bassetlaw | | Labour | | John Mann (L) | |
| Bath | | Liberal Democrats | | Don Foster (LD) | |
| Batley and Spen | | Labour | | Mike Wood (L) | |
| Battersea | | Labour | | Jane Ellison (C) | Gain. Defeated incumbent Martin Linton. |
| Beaconsfield | | Conservative | | Dominic Grieve (C) | |
| Beckenham | | Conservative | | Bob Stewart (C) | Previous incumbent Jacqui Lait did not stand. |
| Bedford | | Labour | | Richard Fuller (C) | Gain. Defeated incumbent Patrick Hall. |
| Belfast East | | DUP | | Naomi Long (APNI) | Gain. Defeated incumbent Peter Robinson. |
| Belfast North | | DUP | | Nigel Dodds (DUP) | |
| Belfast South | | SDLP | | Alasdair McDonnell (SDLP) | |
| Belfast West | | Sinn Féin | | Gerry Adams (SF) | By-election in 2011, see below. |
| Bermondsey and Old Southwark | | Liberal Democrats | | Simon Hughes (LD) | MP for predecessor seat of North Southwark and Bermondsey. |
| Berwick-upon-Tweed | | Liberal Democrats | | Sir Alan Beith (LD) | |
| Berwickshire, Roxburgh and Selkirk | | Liberal Democrats | | Michael Moore (LD) | |
| Bethnal Green and Bow | | Respect | | Rushanara Ali (L) | Gain. Defeated incumbent George Galloway. |
| Beverley and Holderness | | Conservative | | Graham Stuart (C) | |
| Bexhill and Battle | | Conservative | | Greg Barker (C) | |
| Bexleyheath and Crayford | | Conservative | | David Evennett (C) | |
| Birkenhead | | Labour | | Frank Field (L) | |
| Birmingham, Edgbaston | | Labour | | Gisela Stuart (L) | |
| Birmingham, Erdington | | Labour | | Jack Dromey (L) | Previous incumbent Siôn Simon did not stand. |
| Birmingham, Hall Green | | Labour | | Roger Godsiff (L) | Reconfigured seat. Formerly MP for Birmingham Sparkbrook and Small Heath. MP for the old Birmingham Hall Green, Steve McCabe, won in its successor seat of Birmingham Selly Oak. |
| Birmingham, Hodge Hill | | Labour | | Liam Byrne (L) | |
| Birmingham, Ladywood | | Labour | | Shabana Mahmood (L) | Previous incumbent Clare Short stood down. |
| Birmingham, Northfield | | Labour | | Richard Burden (L) | |
| Birmingham, Perry Barr | | Labour | | Khalid Mahmood (L) | |
| Birmingham, Selly Oak | | Labour | | Steve McCabe (L) | Formerly MP for Birmingham Hall Green. Previous incumbent Lynne Jones did not stand. |
| Birmingham, Yardley | | Liberal Democrats | | John Hemming (LD) | |
| Bishop Auckland | | Labour | | Helen Goodman (L) | |
| Blackburn | | Labour | | Jack Straw (L) | |
| Blackley and Broughton | | Labour | | Graham Stringer (L) | MP for predecessor seat of Manchester, Blackley. |
| Blackpool North and Cleveleys | | Labour | | Paul Maynard (C) | MP for predecessor seat of Blackpool North and Fleetwood, Joan Humble, did not stand. |
| Blackpool South | | Labour | | Gordon Marsden (L) | |
| Blaenau Gwent | | BGPV | | Nick Smith (L) | Gain. Defeated incumbent Dai Davies elected at 2006 by-election. |
| Blaydon | | Labour | | Dave Anderson (L) | |
| Blyth Valley | | Labour | | Ronnie Campbell (L) | |
| Bognor Regis and Littlehampton | | Conservative | | Nick Gibb (C) | |
| Bolsover | | Labour | | Dennis Skinner (L) | |
| Bolton North East | | Labour | | David Crausby (L) | |
| Bolton South East | | Labour | | Yasmin Qureshi (L) | Previous incumbent Brian Iddon did not stand. |
| Bolton West | | Labour | | Julie Hilling (L) | Previous incumbent Ruth Kelly did not stand. |
| Bootle | | Labour | | Joe Benton (L) | |
| Boston and Skegness | | Conservative | | Mark Simmonds (C) | |
| Bosworth | | Conservative | | David Tredinnick (C) | |
| Bournemouth East | | Conservative | | Tobias Ellwood (C) | |
| Bournemouth West | | Conservative | | Conor Burns (C) | Previous incumbent John Butterfill did not stand. |
| Bracknell | | Conservative | | Phillip Lee (C) | Previous incumbent Andrew MacKay did not stand. |
| Bradford East | | Labour | | David Ward (LD) | Gain. Defeated Terry Rooney, MP for predecessor seat of Bradford North. |
| Bradford South | | Labour | | Gerry Sutcliffe (L) | |
| Bradford West | | Labour | | Marsha Singh (L) | By-election in 2012, see below. |
| Braintree | | Conservative | | Brooks Newmark (C) | |
| Brecon and Radnorshire | | Liberal Democrats | | Roger Williams (LD) | |
| Brent Central | | Labour | | Sarah Teather (LD) | Gain. Formerly MP for abolished seat of Brent East. Defeated Dawn Butler, MP for predecessor seat of Brent South. |
| Brent North | | Labour | | Barry Gardiner (L) | |
| Brentford and Isleworth | | Labour | | Mary Macleod (C) | Gain. Defeated incumbent Ann Keen. |
| Brentwood and Ongar | | Conservative | | Eric Pickles (C) | |
| Bridgend | | Labour | | Madeleine Moon (L) | |
| Bridgwater and West Somerset | | Conservative | | Ian Liddell-Grainger (C) | MP for predecessor seat of Bridgwater. |
| Brigg and Goole | | Labour | | Andrew Percy (C) | Gain. Defeated incumbent Ian Cawsey. |
| Brighton, Kemptown | | Labour | | Simon Kirby (C) | Gain. Previous incumbent Des Turner did not stand. |
| Brighton, Pavilion | | Labour | | Caroline Lucas (G) | Gain. Previous incumbent David Lepper did not stand. First Green MP elected. |
| Bristol East | | Labour | | Kerry McCarthy (L) | |
| Bristol North West | | Labour | | Charlotte Leslie (C) | Gain. Previous incumbent Doug Naysmith did not stand. |
| Bristol South | | Labour | | Dawn Primarolo (L) | |
| Bristol West | | Liberal Democrats | | Stephen Williams (LD) | |
| Broadland | | Conservative | | Keith Simpson (C) | MP for predecessor seat of Mid Norfolk. |
| Bromley and Chislehurst | | Conservative | | Bob Neill (C) | Elected at 2006 by-election. |
| Bromsgrove | | Conservative | | Sajid Javid (C) | Previous incumbent Julie Kirkbride did not stand. |
| Broxbourne | | Conservative | | Charles Walker (C) | |
| Broxtowe | | Labour | | Anna Soubry (C) | Gain. Defeated incumbent Nick Palmer. |
| Buckingham | | Conservative | | John Bercow (Speaker) | Seat held. Previously elected as a Conservative. |
| Burnley | | Labour | | Gordon Birtwistle (LD) | Gain. Previous incumbent Kitty Ussher did not stand. |
| Burton | | Labour | | Andrew Griffiths (C) | Gain. Previous incumbent Janet Dean did not stand. |
| Bury North | | Labour | | David Nuttall (C) | Gain. Previous incumbent David Chaytor did not stand. |
| Bury South | | Labour | | Ivan Lewis (L) | |
| Bury St Edmunds | | Conservative | | David Ruffley (C) | |
== C ==
| Constituency | Elected MP | Elected party | Previous MP | Previous party | |
| Caerphilly | | Labour | | Wayne David (L) | |
| Caithness, Sutherland and Easter Ross | | Liberal Democrats | | John Thurso (LD) | |
| Calder Valley | | Labour | | Craig Whittaker (C) | Gain. Previous incumbent Christine McCafferty did not stand. |
| Camberwell and Peckham | | Labour | | Harriet Harman (L) | |
| Camborne and Redruth | | Liberal Democrats | | George Eustice (C) | Gain. Defeated Julia Goldsworthy, MP for predecessor seat of Falmouth and Camborne. |
| Cambridge | | Liberal Democrats | | Julian Huppert (LD) | Previous incumbent David Howarth did not stand. |
| Cannock Chase | | Labour | | Aidan Burley (C) | Gain. Previous incumbent Tony Wright did not stand. |
| Canterbury | | Conservative | | Julian Brazier (C) | |
| Cardiff Central | | Liberal Democrats | | Jenny Willott (LD) | |
| Cardiff North | | Labour | | Jonathan Evans (C) | Gain. Defeated incumbent Julie Morgan. |
| Cardiff South and Penarth | | Labour | | Alun Michael (L Co-op) | By-election in 2012, see below. |
| Cardiff West | | Labour | | Kevin Brennan (L) | |
| Carlisle | | Labour | | John Stevenson (C) | Gain. Previous incumbent Eric Martlew did not stand. |
| Carmarthen East and Dinefwr | | Plaid Cymru | | Jonathan Edwards (PC) | Previous incumbent Adam Price did not stand. |
| Carmarthen West and South Pembrokeshire | | Labour | | Simon Hart (C) | Gain. Defeated incumbent Nick Ainger. |
| Carshalton and Wallington | | Liberal Democrats | | Tom Brake (LD) | |
| Castle Point | | Conservative | | Rebecca Harris (C) | Defeated Bob Spink, previous incumbent who ran as an independent. He was elected as a Conservative but defected to UKIP and then sat as an independent. |
| Central Ayrshire | | Labour | | Brian Donohoe (L) | |
| Central Devon | | Conservative | | Mel Stride (C) | New constituency. |
| Central Suffolk and North Ipswich | | Conservative | | Dan Poulter (C) | Previous incumbent Michael Lord did not stand. |
| Ceredigion | | Liberal Democrats | | Mark Williams (LD) | |
| Charnwood | | Conservative | | Stephen Dorrell (C) | |
| Chatham and Aylesford | | Labour | | Tracey Crouch (C) | Gain. Defeated incumbent Jonathan Shaw. |
| Cheadle | | Liberal Democrats | | Mark Hunter (LD) | Elected at 2005 by-election. |
| Chelmsford | | Conservative | | Simon Burns (C) | MP for predecessor seat of West Chelmsford. |
| Chelsea and Fulham | | Conservative | | Greg Hands (C) | New constituency. Formerly MP for Hammersmith and Fulham. |
| Cheltenham | | Liberal Democrats | | Martin Horwood (LD) | |
| Chesham and Amersham | | Conservative | | Cheryl Gillan (C) | |
| City of Chester | | Labour | | Stephen Mosley (C) | Gain. Defeated incumbent Christine Russell. |
| Chesterfield | | Liberal Democrats | | Toby Perkins (L) | Gain. Defeated incumbent Paul Holmes. |
| Chichester | | Conservative | | Andrew Tyrie (C) | |
| Chingford and Woodford Green | | Conservative | | Iain Duncan Smith (C) | |
| Chippenham | | Liberal Democrats | | Duncan Hames (LD) | New constituency. |
| Chipping Barnet | | Conservative | | Theresa Villiers (C) | |
| Chorley | | Labour | | Lindsay Hoyle (L) | |
| Christchurch | | Conservative | | Christopher Chope (C) | |
| Cities of London and Westminster | | Conservative | | Mark Field (C) | |
| Clacton | | Conservative | | Douglas Carswell (C) | MP for predecessor seat of Harwich. Douglas Carswell defected to UKIP in 2014, resigned his seat and was then elected as UKIP's first ever MP at the by-election held after he defected, see below. |
| Cleethorpes | | Labour | | Martin Vickers (C) | Gain. Defeated Incumbent Shona McIsaac. |
| Clwyd South | | Labour | | Susan Elan Jones (L) | Previous incumbent Martyn Jones did not stand. |
| Clwyd West | | Conservative | | David Jones (C) | |
| Coatbridge, Chryston and Bellshill | | Labour | | Tom Clarke (L) | |
| Colchester | | Liberal Democrats | | Bob Russell (LD) | |
| Colne Valley | | Labour | | Jason McCartney (C) | Gain. Previous incumbent Kali Mountford did not stand. |
| Congleton | | Conservative | | Fiona Bruce (C) | Previous incumbent Ann Winterton did not stand. |
| Copeland | | Labour | | Jamie Reed (L) | |
| Corby | | Labour | | Louise Bagshawe (C) | Gain. Defeated incumbent Phil Hope. Louise Mensch since marriage in June 2011. By-election in 2012, see below. |
| The Cotswolds | | Conservative | | Geoffrey Clifton-Brown (C) | MP for predecessor seat of Cotswold. |
| Coventry North East | | Labour | | Bob Ainsworth (L) | |
| Coventry North West | | Labour | | Geoffrey Robinson (L) | |
| Coventry South | | Labour Party | | Jim Cunningham (L) | |
| Crawley | | Labour | | Henry Smith (C) | Gain. Previous incumbent Laura Moffatt did not stand. |
| Crewe and Nantwich | | Labour | | Edward Timpson (C) | Seat held. Won by the Conservatives at 2008 by-election. |
| Croydon Central | | Labour | | Gavin Barwell (C) | Seat held. Notional gain following boundary changes. |
| Croydon North | | Labour | | Malcolm Wicks (L) | By-election in 2012 after death of MP, see below. |
| Croydon South | | Conservative | | Richard Ottaway (C) | |
| Cumbernauld, Kilsyth and Kirkintilloch East | | Labour | | Gregg McClymont (L) | Previous incumbent Rosemary McKenna did not stand. |
| Cynon Valley | | Labour | | Ann Clwyd (L) | |
== D ==
| Constituency | Elected MP | Elected party | Previous MP | Previous party | |
| Dagenham and Rainham | | Labour | | Jon Cruddas (L) | MP for predecessor seat of Dagenham. |
| Darlington | | Labour | | Jenny Chapman (L) | Previous incumbent Alan Milburn did not stand. |
| Dartford | | Labour | | Gareth Johnson (C) | Gain. Previous incumbent Howard Stoate did not stand. |
| Daventry | | Conservative | | Chris Heaton-Harris (C) | Previous incumbent Tim Boswell did not stand. |
| Delyn | | Labour | | David Hanson (L) | |
| Denton and Reddish | | Labour | | Andrew Gwynne (L) | |
| Derby North | | Labour | | Chris Williamson (L) | Previous incumbent Bob Laxton did not stand. |
| Derby South | | Labour | | Margaret Beckett (L) | |
| Derbyshire Dales | | Conservative | | Patrick McLoughlin (C) | MP for predecessor seat of West Derbyshire. |
| Devizes | | Conservative | | Claire Perry (C) | Previous incumbent Michael Ancram did not stand. |
| Dewsbury | | Labour | | Simon Reevell (C) | Gain. Defeated incumbent Shahid Malik. |
| Don Valley | | Labour | | Caroline Flint (L) | |
| Doncaster Central | | Labour | | Rosie Winterton (L) | |
| Doncaster North | | Labour | | Ed Miliband (L) | |
| Dover | | Labour | | Charlie Elphicke (C) | Gain. Defeated incumbent Gwyn Prosser. |
| Dudley North | | Labour | | Ian Austin (L) | |
| Dudley South | | Labour | | Chris Kelly (C) | Gain. Previous incumbent Ian Pearson did not stand. |
| Dulwich and West Norwood | | Labour | | Tessa Jowell (L) | |
| Dumfries and Galloway | | Labour | | Russell Brown (L) | |
| Dumfriesshire, Clydesdale and Tweeddale | | Conservative | | David Mundell (C) | |
| Dundee East | | SNP | | Stewart Hosie (SNP) | |
| Dundee West | | Labour | | Jim McGovern (L) | |
| Dunfermline and West Fife | | Labour | | Thomas Docherty (L) | Notional hold. Defeated incumbent Willie Rennie who won seat for the Liberal Democrats at 2006 by-election. |
| City of Durham | | Labour | | Roberta Blackman-Woods (L) | |
| Dwyfor Meirionnydd | | Plaid Cymru | | Elfyn Llwyd (PC) | MP for predecessor seat of Meirionnydd Nant Conwy. |
=== E ===
| Constituency | Elected MP | Elected party | Previous MP | Previous party | |
| Ealing Central and Acton | | Labour | | Angie Bray (C) | Gain. MP for predecessor seat of Ealing, Acton and Shepherd's Bush, Andy Slaughter won in Hammersmith. |
| Ealing North | | Labour | | Stephen Pound (L) | 1st time since 1974 that the party with the largest number of seats has not won the seat. |
| Ealing, Southall | | Labour | | Virendra Sharma (L) | Elected at 2007 by-election. |
| Easington | | Labour | | Grahame Morris (L) | Previous incumbent John Cummings did not stand. |
| East Antrim | | DUP | | Sammy Wilson (DUP) | |
| East Devon | | Conservative | | Hugo Swire (C) | |
| East Dunbartonshire | | Liberal Democrats | | Jo Swinson (LD) | |
| East Ham | | Labour | | Stephen Timms (L) | |
| East Hampshire | | Conservative | | Damian Hinds (C) | Previous incumbent Michael Mates did not stand. |
| East Kilbride, Strathaven and Lesmahagow | | Labour | | Michael McCann (L) | Previous incumbent Adam Ingram did not stand. |
| East Londonderry | | DUP | | Gregory Campbell (DUP) | |
| East Lothian | | Labour | | Fiona O'Donnell (L) | Previous incumbent Anne Picking did not stand. |
| East Renfrewshire | | Labour | | Jim Murphy (L) | |
| East Surrey | | Conservative | | Sam Gyimah (C) | Previous incumbent Peter Ainsworth did not stand. |
| East Worthing and Shoreham | | Conservative | | Tim Loughton (C) | |
| East Yorkshire | | Conservative | | Greg Knight (C) | |
| Eastbourne | | Conservative | | Stephen Lloyd (LD) | Gain. Defeated incumbent Nigel Waterson. |
| Eastleigh | | Liberal Democrats | | Chris Huhne (LD) | Chris Huhne resigned 2013. By-election in 2013, see below. |
| Eddisbury | | Conservative | | Stephen O'Brien (C) | |
| Edinburgh East | | Labour | | Sheila Gilmore (L) | Previous incumbent Gavin Strang did not stand. |
| Edinburgh North and Leith | | Labour | | Mark Lazarowicz (L Co-op) | |
| Edinburgh South | | Labour | | Ian Murray (L) | Previous incumbent Nigel Griffiths did not stand. |
| Edinburgh South West | | Labour | | Alistair Darling (L) | |
| Edinburgh West | | Liberal Democrats | | Michael Crockart (LD) | Previous incumbent John Barrett did not stand. |
| Edmonton | | Labour | | Andy Love (L Co-op) | |
| Ellesmere Port and Neston | | Labour | | Andrew Miller (L) | |
| Elmet and Rothwell | | Labour | | Alec Shelbrooke (C) | Gain. MP for predecessor seat of Elmet, Colin Burgon, did not stand. |
| Eltham | | Labour | | Clive Efford (L) | |
| Enfield North | | Labour | | Nick de Bois (C) | Gain. Defeated incumbent Joan Ryan. |
| Enfield, Southgate | | Conservative | | David Burrowes (C) | |
| Epping Forest | | Conservative | | Eleanor Laing (C) | |
| Epsom and Ewell | | Conservative | | Chris Grayling (C) | |
| Erewash | | Labour | | Jessica Lee (C) | Gain. Previous incumbent Liz Blackman did not stand. |
| Erith and Thamesmead | | Labour | | Teresa Pearce (L) | Previous incumbent John Austin did not stand. |
| Esher and Walton | | Conservative | | Dominic Raab (C) | Previous incumbent Ian Taylor did not stand. |
| Exeter | | Labour | | Ben Bradshaw (L) | |
=== F ===
| Constituency | Elected MP | Elected party | Previous MP | Previous party | |
| Falkirk | | Labour | | Eric Joyce (L) | Suspended then resigned from his party in 2012. |
| Fareham | | Conservative | | Mark Hoban (C) | |
| Faversham and Mid Kent | | Conservative | | Hugh Robertson (C) | |
| Feltham and Heston | | Labour | | Alan Keen (L Co-op) | By-election on MP's death in 2011, see below. |
| Fermanagh and South Tyrone | | Sinn Féin | | Michelle Gildernew (SF) | |
| Filton and Bradley Stoke | | Conservative | | Jack Lopresti (C) | New constituency. |
| Finchley and Golders Green | | Conservative | | Mike Freer (C) | Notional hold following boundary changes. Previous incumbent Rudi Vis did not stand. |
| Folkestone and Hythe | | Conservative | | Damian Collins (C) | Previous incumbent Michael Howard did not stand. |
| Forest of Dean | | Conservative | | Mark Harper (C) | |
| Foyle | | SDLP | | Mark Durkan (SDLP) | |
| Fylde | | Conservative | | Mark Menzies (C) | Previous incumbent Michael Jack did not stand. |
=== G ===
| Constituency | Elected MP | Elected party | Previous MP | Previous party | |
| Gainsborough | | Conservative | | Edward Leigh (C) | |
| Garston and Halewood | | Labour | | Maria Eagle (L) | MP for predecessor seat of Liverpool Garston. |
| Gateshead | | Labour | | Ian Mearns (L) | MP for predecessor seat of Tyne Bridge, David Clelland, did not stand. |
| Gedling | | Labour | | Vernon Coaker (L) | |
| Gillingham and Rainham | | Labour | | Rehman Chishti (C) | Gain. Defeated Paul Clark, MP for predecessor seat of Gillingham. |
| Glasgow Central | | Labour | | Anas Sarwar (L) | Previous incumbent Mohammad Sarwar did not stand. |
| Glasgow East | | Labour | | Margaret Curran (L) | Notional hold. Defeated incumbent John Mason who won seat for the SNP at 2008 by-election. |
| Glasgow North | | Labour | | Ann McKechin (L) | |
| Glasgow North East | | Labour | | Willie Bain (L) | Elected at 2009 by-election. |
| Glasgow North West | | Labour | | John Robertson (L) | |
| Glasgow South | | Labour | | Tom Harris (L) | |
| Glasgow South West | | Labour | | Ian Davidson (L Co-op) | |
| Glenrothes | | Labour | | Lindsay Roy (L) | Elected at 2008 by-election. |
| Gloucester | | Labour | | Richard Graham (C) | Gain. Defeated incumbent Parmjit Dhanda. |
| Gordon | | Liberal Democrats | | Malcolm Bruce (LD) | |
| Gosport | | Conservative | | Caroline Dinenage (C) | Previous incumbent Peter Viggers did not stand. |
| Gower | | Labour | | Martin Caton (L) | |
| Grantham and Stamford | | Conservative | | Nicholas Boles (C) | Previous incumbent Quentin Davies did not stand. |
| Gravesham | | Conservative | | Adam Holloway (C) | |
| Great Grimsby | | Labour | | Austin Mitchell (L) | |
| Great Yarmouth | | Labour | | Brandon Lewis (C) | Gain. Defeated incumbent Tony Wright. |
| Greenwich and Woolwich | | Labour | | Nick Raynsford (L) | |
| Guildford | | Conservative | | Anne Milton (C) | |
=== H ===
| Constituency | Elected MP | Elected party | Previous MP | Previous party | |
| Hackney North and Stoke Newington | | Labour | | Diane Abbott (L) | |
| Hackney South and Shoreditch | | Labour | | Meg Hillier (L Co-op) | |
| Halesowen and Rowley Regis | | Labour | | James Morris (C) | Gain. Previous incumbent Sylvia Heal did not stand. |
| Halifax | | Labour | | Linda Riordan (L Co-op) | |
| Haltemprice and Howden | | Conservative | | David Davis (C) | |
| Halton | | Labour | | Derek Twigg (L) | |
| Hammersmith | | Labour | | Andy Slaughter (L) | Notional hold following boundary changes. Formerly MP for Ealing, Acton and Shepherd's Bush. Greg Hands, MP for predecessor seat of Hammersmith and Fulham, won in Chelsea and Fulham. |
| Hampstead and Kilburn | | Labour | | Glenda Jackson (L) | MP for predecessor seat of Hampstead and Highgate. |
| Harborough | | Conservative | | Edward Garnier (C) | |
| Harlow | | Labour | | Robert Halfon (C) | Gain. Defeated incumbent Bill Rammell. |
| Harrogate and Knaresborough | | Liberal Democrats | | Andrew Jones (C) | Gain. Previous incumbent Phil Willis did not stand. |
| Harrow East | | Labour | | Bob Blackman (C) | Gain. Defeated incumbent Tony McNulty. |
| Harrow West | | Labour | | Gareth Thomas (L Co-op) | |
| Hartlepool | | Labour | | Iain Wright (L) | |
| Harwich and North Essex | | Conservative | | Bernard Jenkin (C) | MP for predecessor seat of North Essex. |
| Hastings and Rye | | Labour | | Amber Rudd (C) | Gain. Defeated incumbent Michael Foster. |
| Havant | | Conservative | | David Willetts (C) | |
| Hayes and Harlington | | Labour | | John McDonnell (L) | |
| Hazel Grove | | Liberal Democrats | | Andrew Stunell (LD) | |
| Hemel Hempstead | | Conservative | | Mike Penning (C) | |
| Hemsworth | | Labour | | Jon Trickett (L) | |
| Hendon | | Labour | | Matthew Offord (C) | Gain. Defeated incumbent Andrew Dismore. |
| Henley | | Conservative | | John Howell (C) | Elected at 2008 by-election. |
| Hereford and South Herefordshire | | Liberal Democrats | | Jesse Norman (C) | Gain. MP for predecessor seat of Hereford, Paul Keetch, did not stand. |
| Hertford and Stortford | | Conservative | | Mark Prisk (C) | |
| Hertsmere | | Conservative | | James Clappison (C) | |
| Hexham | | Conservative | | Guy Opperman (C) | Previous incumbent Peter Atkinson did not stand. |
| Heywood and Middleton | | Labour | | Jim Dobbin (L Co-op) | |
| High Peak | | Labour | | Andrew Bingham (C) | Gain. Defeated incumbent Tom Levitt. |
| Hitchin and Harpenden | | Conservative | | Peter Lilley (C) | |
| Holborn and St Pancras | | Labour | | Frank Dobson (L) | |
| Hornchurch and Upminster | | Conservative | | Angela Watkinson (C) | MP for predecessor seat of Upminster. |
| Hornsey and Wood Green | | Liberal Democrats | | Lynne Featherstone (LD) | |
| Horsham | | Conservative | | Francis Maude (C) | |
| Houghton and Sunderland South | | Labour | | Bridget Phillipson (L) | MP for predecessor seat of Houghton and Washington East, Fraser Kemp, did not stand. |
| Hove | | Labour | | Mike Weatherley (C) | Gain. Defeated incumbent Celia Barlow. |
| Huddersfield | | Labour | | Barry Sheerman (L Co-op) | |
| Huntingdon | | Conservative | | Jonathan Djanogly (C) | |
| Hyndburn | | Labour | | Graham Jones (L) | Previous incumbent Greg Pope did not stand. |
=== I ===
| Constituency | Elected MP | Elected party | Previous MP | Previous party | |
| Ilford North | | Conservative | | Lee Scott (C) | |
| Ilford South | | Labour | | Mike Gapes (L Co-op) | |
| Inverclyde | | Labour | | David Cairns (L) | By-election on MP's death in 2013, see below. |
| Inverness, Nairn, Badenoch and Strathspey | | Liberal Democrats | | Danny Alexander (LD) | |
| Ipswich | | Labour | | Ben Gummer (C) | Gain. Defeated incumbent Chris Mole. |
| Isle of Wight | | Conservative | | Andrew Turner (C) | |
| Islington North | | Labour | | Jeremy Corbyn (L) | |
| Islington South and Finsbury | | Labour | | Emily Thornberry (L) | |
| Islwyn | | Labour | | Chris Evans (L Co-op) | Previous incumbent Don Touhig did not stand. |
=== J ===
| Constituency | Elected MP | Elected party | Previous MP | Previous party | |
| Jarrow | | Labour | | Stephen Hepburn (L) | |
=== K ===
| Constituency | Elected MP | Elected party | Previous MP | Previous party | |
| Keighley | | Labour | | Kris Hopkins (C) | Gain. Previous incumbent Ann Cryer did not stand. |
| Kenilworth and Southam | | Conservative | | Jeremy Wright (C) | New constituency. Formerly MP for Rugby and Kenilworth. |
| Kensington | | Conservative | | Sir Malcolm Rifkind (C) | MP for predecessor seat of Kensington and Chelsea. |
| Kettering | | Conservative | | Philip Hollobone (C) | |
| Kilmarnock and Loudoun | | Labour | | Cathy Jamieson (L Co-op) | Previous incumbent Des Browne did not stand. |
| Kingston and Surbiton | | Liberal Democrats | | Ed Davey (LD) | |
| Kingston upon Hull East | | Labour | | Karl Turner (L) | Previous incumbent John Prescott did not stand. |
| Kingston upon Hull North | | Labour | | Diana Johnson (L) | |
| Kingston upon Hull West and Hessle | | Labour | | Alan Johnson (L) | |
| Kingswood | | Labour | | Chris Skidmore (C) | Gain. Defeated incumbent Roger Berry. |
| Kirkcaldy and Cowdenbeath | | Labour | | Gordon Brown (L) | Outgoing Prime Minister (resigned as PM 11 May 2010). |
| Knowsley | | Labour | | George Howarth (L) | Formerly MP for abolished seat of Knowsley North and Sefton East. MP for predecessor seat of Knowsley South, Eddie O'Hara, did not stand. |
=== L ===
| Constituency | Elected MP | Elected party | Previous MP | Previous party | |
| Lagan Valley | | DUP | | Jeffrey Donaldson (DUP) | |
| Lanark and Hamilton East | | Labour | | Jimmy Hood (L) | |
| Lancaster and Fleetwood | | Labour | | Eric Ollerenshaw (C) | Notional gain. MP for predecessor seat of Lancaster and Wyre, Ben Wallace won in Wyre and Preston North. |
| Leeds Central | | Labour | | Hilary Benn (L) | |
| Leeds East | | Labour | | George Mudie (L) | |
| Leeds North East | | Labour | | Fabian Hamilton (L) | |
| Leeds North West | | Liberal Democrats | | Greg Mulholland (LD) | |
| Leeds West | | Labour | | Rachel Reeves (L) | Previous incumbent John Battle did not stand. |
| Leicester East | | Labour | | Keith Vaz (L) | |
| Leicester South | | Labour | | Peter Soulsby (L) | |
| Leicester West | | Labour | | Liz Kendall (L) | Previous incumbent Patricia Hewitt did not stand. |
| Leigh | | Labour | | Andrew Burnham (L) | |
| Lewes | | Liberal Democrats | | Norman Baker (LD) | |
| Lewisham East | | Labour | | Heidi Alexander (L) | Previous incumbent Bridget Prentice did not stand. |
| Lewisham West and Penge | | Labour | | Jim Dowd (L) | MP for predecessor seat of Lewisham West |
| Lewisham, Deptford | | Labour | | Joan Ruddock (L) | |
| Leyton and Wanstead | | Labour | | John Cryer (L) | Previous incumbent Harry Cohen did not stand. |
| Lichfield | | Conservative | | Michael Fabricant (C) | |
| Lincoln | | Labour | | Karl McCartney (C) | Gain. Defeated incumbent Gillian Merron. |
| Linlithgow and East Falkirk | | Labour | | Michael Connarty (L) | |
| Liverpool, Riverside | | Labour | | Louise Ellman (L Co-op) | |
| Liverpool, Walton | | Labour | | Steve Rotheram (L) | Previous incumbent Peter Kilfoyle did not stand. |
| Liverpool, Wavertree | | Labour | | Luciana Berger (L Co-op) | Previous incumbent Jane Kennedy did not stand. |
| Liverpool, West Derby | | Labour | | Stephen Twigg (L Co-op) | Previous incumbent Bob Wareing did not stand. |
| Livingston | | Labour | | Graeme Morrice (L) | Previous incumbent Jim Devine, elected at 2005 by-election, did not stand. |
| Llanelli | | Labour | | Nia Griffith (L) | |
| Loughborough | | Labour | | Nicky Morgan (C) | Gain. Defeated incumbent Andy Reed. |
| Louth and Horncastle | | Conservative | | Sir Peter Tapsell (C) | |
| Ludlow | | Conservative | | Philip Dunne (C) | |
| Luton North | | Labour | | Kelvin Hopkins (L) | |
| Luton South | | Labour | | Gavin Shuker (L Co-op) | Previous incumbent Margaret Moran did not stand. |
=== M ===
| Constituency | Elected MP | Elected party | Previous MP | Previous party | |
| Macclesfield | | Conservative | | David Rutley (C) | Previous incumbent Nicholas Winterton did not stand. |
| Maidenhead | | Conservative | | Theresa May (C) | |
| Maidstone and The Weald | | Conservative | | Helen Grant (C) | Previous incumbent Ann Widdecombe did not stand. |
| Makerfield | | Labour | | Yvonne Fovargue (L) | Previous incumbent Ian McCartney did not stand. |
| Maldon | | Conservative | | John Whittingdale (C) | MP for predecessor seat of Maldon and East Chelmsford. |
| Manchester Central | | Labour | | Tony Lloyd (L) | By-election in 2012, see below. |
| Manchester, Gorton | | Labour | | Sir Gerald Kaufman (L) | |
| Manchester Withington | | Liberal Democrats | | John Leech (LD) | |
| Mansfield | | Labour | | Alan Meale (L) | |
| Meon Valley | | Conservative | | George Hollingbery (C) | New constituency. |
| Meriden | | Conservative | | Caroline Spelman (C) | |
| Merthyr Tydfil and Rhymney | | Labour | | Dai Havard (L) | |
| Mid Bedfordshire | | Conservative | | Nadine Dorries (C) | |
| Mid Derbyshire | | Conservative | | Pauline Latham (C) | New constituency. |
| Mid Dorset and North Poole | | Liberal Democrats | | Annette Brooke (LD) | |
| Mid Norfolk | | Conservative | | George Freeman (C) | Reconfigured seat. MP for the old Mid Norfolk seat, Keith Simpson, won in its successor seat of Broadland. |
| Mid Sussex | | Conservative | | Nicholas Soames (C) | |
| Mid Ulster | | Sinn Féin | | Martin McGuinness (SF) | |
| Mid Worcestershire | | Conservative | | Peter Luff (C) | |
| Middlesbrough | | Labour | | Sir Stuart Bell (L) | |
| Middlesbrough South and East Cleveland | | Labour | | Tom Blenkinsop (L) | Seat vacant due to death of previous incumbent Ashok Kumar. |
| Midlothian | | Labour | | David Hamilton (L) | |
| Milton Keynes North | | Labour | | Mark Lancaster (C) | Notional gain following boundary changes. MP for predecessor seat of North East Milton Keynes. |
| Milton Keynes South | | Labour | | Iain Stewart (C) | Gain. Defeated Phyllis Starkey, MP for predecessor seat of Milton Keynes South West. |
| Mitcham and Morden | | Labour | | Siobhain McDonagh (L) | |
| Mole Valley | | Conservative | | Sir Paul Beresford (C) | |
| Monmouth | | Conservative | | David Davies (C) | |
| Montgomeryshire | | Liberal Democrats | | Glyn Davies (C) | Gain. Defeated incumbent Lembit Öpik. |
| Moray | | SNP | | Angus Robertson (SNP) | |
| Morecambe and Lunesdale | | Labour | | David Morris (C) | Gain. Defeated incumbent Geraldine Smith. |
| Morley and Outwood | | Labour | | Ed Balls (L Co-op) | Formerly MP for the abolished seat of Normanton. MP for the predecessor seat of Morley and Rothwell, Colin Challen, did not stand. |
| Motherwell and Wishaw | | Labour | | Frank Roy (L) | |
=== N ===
| Constituency | Elected MP | Elected party | Previous MP | Previous party | |
| Na h-Eileanan an Iar (Western Isles) | | SNP | | Angus MacNeil (SNP) | |
| Neath | | Labour | | Peter Hain (L) | |
| New Forest East | | Conservative | | Julian Lewis (C) | |
| New Forest West | | Conservative | | Desmond Swayne (C) | |
| Newark | | Conservative | | Patrick Mercer (C) | |
| Newbury | | Conservative | | Richard Benyon (C) | |
| Newcastle upon Tyne Central | | Labour | | Chinyelu Onwurah (L) | Previous incumbent Jim Cousins did not stand. |
| Newcastle upon Tyne East | | Labour | | Nick Brown (L) | MP for predecessor seat of Newcastle upon Tyne East and Wallsend. |
| Newcastle upon Tyne North | | Labour | | Catherine McKinnell (L) | Previous incumbent Doug Henderson did not stand. |
| Newcastle-under-Lyme | | Labour | | Paul Farrelly (L) | |
| Newport East | | Labour | | Jessica Morden (L) | |
| Newport West | | Labour | | Paul Flynn (L) | |
| Newry and Armagh | | Sinn Féin | | Conor Murphy (SF) | |
| Newton Abbot | | Liberal Democrats | | Anne Marie Morris (C) | Gain. Defeated Richard Younger-Ross, MP for predecessor seat of Teignbridge. |
| Normanton, Pontefract and Castleford | | Labour | | Yvette Cooper (L) | MP for predecessor seat of Pontefract and Castleford. |
| North Antrim | | DUP | | Ian Paisley Jr (DUP) | Previous incumbent Ian Paisley Sr did not stand. |
| North Ayrshire and Arran | | Labour | | Katy Clark (L) | |
| North Cornwall | | Liberal Democrats | | Dan Rogerson (LD) | |
| North Devon | | Liberal Democrats | | Nick Harvey (LD) | |
| North Dorset | | Conservative | | Bob Walter (C) | |
| North Down | | UUP | | Sylvia, Lady Hermon (Ind) | Seat held. Stood as Independent Unionist in objection to party line. |
| North Durham | | Labour | | Kevan Jones (L) | |
| North East Bedfordshire | | Conservative | | Alistair Burt (C) | |
| North East Cambridgeshire | | Conservative | | Steve Barclay (C) | Previous incumbent Malcolm Moss did not stand. |
| North East Derbyshire | | Labour | | Natascha Engel (L) | |
| North East Fife | | Liberal Democrats | | Sir Menzies Campbell (LD) | |
| North East Hampshire | | Conservative | | James Arbuthnot (C) | |
| North East Hertfordshire | | Conservative | | Oliver Heald (C) | |
| North East Somerset | | Conservative | | Jacob Rees-Mogg (C) | Notional hold following boundary changes. Defeated Dan Norris, MP for predecessor seat of Wansdyke. |
| North Herefordshire | | Conservative | | Bill Wiggin (C) | MP for predecessor seat of Leominster. |
| North Norfolk | | Liberal Democrats | | Norman Lamb (LD) | |
| North Shropshire | | Conservative | | Owen Paterson (C) | |
| North Somerset | | Conservative | | Liam Fox (C) | MP for predecessor seat of Woodspring. |
| North Swindon | | Labour | | Justin Tomlinson (C) | Gain. Previous incumbent Michael Wills did not stand. |
| North Thanet | | Conservative | | Roger Gale (C) | |
| North Tyneside | | Labour | | Mary Glindon (L) | Previous incumbent Stephen Byers did not stand. |
| North Warwickshire | | Labour | | Dan Byles (C) | Gain. Defeated incumbent Mike O'Brien. |
| North West Cambridgeshire | | Conservative | | Shailesh Vara (C) | |
| North West Durham | | Labour | | Pat Glass (L) | Previous incumbent Hilary Armstrong did not stand. |
| North West Hampshire | | Conservative | | Sir George Young, Bt (C) | |
| North West Leicestershire | | Labour | | Andrew Bridgen (C) | Gain. Previous incumbent David Taylor did not stand. |
| North West Norfolk | | Conservative | | Henry Bellingham (C) | |
| North Wiltshire | | Conservative | | James Gray (C) | |
| Northampton North | | Labour | | Michael Ellis (C) | Gain. Defeated incumbent Sally Keeble. |
| Northampton South | | Labour | | Brian Binley (C) | Seat held. Notional gain following boundary changes. |
| Norwich North | | Conservative | | Chloe Smith (C) | Notional hold following boundary changes. Seat gained from Labour under old boundaries at 2009 by-election. |
| Norwich South | | Labour | | Simon Wright (LD) | Gain. Defeated incumbent Charles Clarke. |
| Nottingham East | | Labour | | Chris Leslie (L Co-op) | Previous incumbent John Heppell did not stand. |
| Nottingham North | | Labour | | Graham Allen (L) | |
| Nottingham South | | Labour | | Lilian Greenwood (L) | Previous incumbent Alan Simpson did not stand. |
| Nuneaton | | Labour | | Marcus Jones (C) | Gain. Previous incumbent Bill Olner did not stand. |
=== O ===
| Constituency | Elected MP | Elected party | Previous MP | Previous party | |
| Ochil and South Perthshire | | Labour | | Gordon Banks (L) | |
| Ogmore | | Labour | | Huw Irranca-Davies (L) | |
| Old Bexley and Sidcup | | Conservative | | James Brokenshire (C) | Formerly MP for the abolished seat of Hornchurch. |
| Oldham East and Saddleworth | | Labour | | Phil Woolas (L) | On 5 November 2010, election declared void on petition causing a by-election. |
| Oldham West and Royton | | Labour | | Michael Meacher (L) | |
| Orkney and Shetland | | Liberal Democrats | | Alistair Carmichael (LD) | |
| Orpington | | Conservative | | Jo Johnson (C) | Previous incumbent John Horam did not stand. |
| Oxford East | | Labour | | Andrew Smith (L) | |
| Oxford West and Abingdon | | Liberal Democrats | | Nicola Blackwood (C) | Gain. Defeated incumbent Evan Harris. |
=== P ===
| Constituency | Elected MP | Elected party | Previous MP | Previous party | |
| Paisley and Renfrewshire North | | Labour | | James Sheridan (L) | |
| Paisley and Renfrewshire South | | Labour | | Douglas Alexander (L) | |
| Pendle | | Labour | | Andrew Stephenson (C) | Gain. Defeated incumbent Gordon Prentice. |
| Penistone and Stocksbridge | | Labour | | Angela Smith (L) | MP for predecessor seat of Sheffield Hillsborough. |
| Penrith and The Border | | Conservative | | Rory Stewart (C) | Previous incumbent David Maclean did not stand. |
| Perth and North Perthshire | | SNP | | Pete Wishart (SNP) | |
| Peterborough | | Conservative | | Stewart Jackson (C) | |
| Plymouth, Moor View | | Labour | | Alison Seabeck (L) | MP for the predecessor seat of Plymouth Devonport. |
| Plymouth, Sutton and Devonport | | Labour | | Oliver Colvile (C) | Gain. Defeated Linda Gilroy, MP for predecessor seat of Plymouth Sutton. |
| Pontypridd | | Labour | | Owen Smith (L) | Previous incumbent Kim Howells did not stand. |
| Poole | | Conservative | | Robert Syms (C) | |
| Poplar and Limehouse | | Labour | | Jim Fitzpatrick (L) | MP for predecessor seat of Poplar and Canning Town. |
| Portsmouth North | | Labour | | Penny Mordaunt (C) | Gain. Defeated incumbent Sarah McCarthy-Fry. |
| Portsmouth South | | Liberal Democrats | | Mike Hancock (LD) | |
| Preseli Pembrokeshire | | Conservative | | Stephen Crabb (C) | |
| Preston | | Labour | | Mark Hendrick (L Co-op) | |
| Pudsey | | Labour | | Stuart Andrew (C) | Gain. Previous incumbent Paul Truswell did not stand. |
| Putney | | Conservative | | Justine Greening (C) | |
=== R ===
| Constituency | Elected MP | Elected party | Previous MP | Previous party | |
| Rayleigh and Wickford | | Conservative | | Mark Francois (C) | MP for predecessor seat of Rayleigh. |
| Reading East | | Conservative | | Rob Wilson (C) | |
| Reading West | | Labour | | Alok Sharma (C) | Gain. Previous incumbent Martin Salter did not stand. |
| Redcar | | Labour | | Ian Swales (LD) | Gain. Defeated incumbent Vera Baird. |
| Redditch | | Labour | | Karen Lumley (C) | Gain. Defeated incumbent Jacqui Smith. |
| Reigate | | Conservative | | Crispin Blunt (C) | |
| Rhondda | | Labour | | Chris Bryant (L) | |
| Ribble Valley | | Conservative | | Nigel Evans (C) | |
| Richmond (Yorks) | | Conservative | | William Hague (C) | |
| Richmond Park | | Liberal Democrats | | Zac Goldsmith (C) | Gain. Defeated incumbent Susan Kramer. |
| Rochdale | | Liberal Democrats | | Simon Danczuk (L) | Gain. Defeated incumbent Paul Rowen. |
| Rochester and Strood | | Conservative | | Mark Reckless (C) | Notional hold following boundary changes. MP for predecessor seat of Medway, Bob Marshall-Andrews, did not stand. Mark Reckless defected to UKIP, resigned his seat and was then elected as the second UKIP Member at the by-election triggered by his resignation. |
| Rochford and Southend East | | Conservative | | James Duddridge (C) | |
| Romford | | Conservative | | Andrew Rosindell (C) | |
| Romsey and Southampton North | | Liberal Democrats | | Caroline Nokes (C) | Gain. Defeated Sandra Gidley, MP for predecessor seat of Romsey. |
| Ross, Skye and Lochaber | | Liberal Democrats | | Charles Kennedy (LD) | |
| Rossendale and Darwen | | Labour | | Jake Berry (C) | Gain. Defeated incumbent Janet Anderson. |
| Rother Valley | | Labour | | Kevin Barron (L) | |
| Rotherham | | Labour | | Denis MacShane (L) | By-election held in 2012, see below. |
| Rugby | | Labour | | Mark Pawsey (C) | Notional gain following boundary changes. MP for predecessor seat of Rugby and Kenilworth, Jeremy Wright, won in Kenilworth and Southam. |
| Ruislip, Northwood and Pinner | | Conservative | | Nick Hurd (C) | MP for predecessor seat of Ruislip-Northwood. |
| Runnymede and Weybridge | | Conservative | | Philip Hammond (C) | |
| Rushcliffe | | Conservative | | Kenneth Clarke (C) | |
| Rutherglen and Hamilton West | | Labour | | Tom Greatrex (L Co-op) | Previous incumbent Tommy McAvoy did not stand. |
| Rutland and Melton | | Conservative | | Alan Duncan (C) | |
=== S ===
| Constituency | Elected MP | Elected party | Previous MP | Previous party | |
| Saffron Walden | | Conservative | | Sir Alan Haselhurst (C) | |
| Salford and Eccles | | Labour | | Hazel Blears (L) | MP for predecessor seat of Salford. |
| Salisbury | | Conservative | | John Glen (C) | Previous incumbent Robert Key did not stand. |
| Scarborough and Whitby | | Conservative | | Robert Goodwill (C) | |
| Scunthorpe | | Labour | | Nic Dakin (L) | Previous incumbent Elliot Morley did not stand. |
| Sedgefield | | Labour | | Phil Wilson (L) | Elected at 2007 by-election. |
| Sefton Central | | Labour | | Bill Esterson (L) | MP for predecessor seat of Crosby, Claire Curtis-Thomas, did not stand. |
| Selby and Ainsty | | Conservative | | Nigel Adams (C) | Notional hold following boundary changes. MP for predecessor seat of Selby, John Grogan, did not stand. |
| Sevenoaks | | Conservative | | Michael Fallon (C) | |
| Sheffield Central | | Labour | | Paul Blomfield (L) | Previous incumbent Richard Caborn did not stand. |
| Sheffield South East | | Labour | | Clive Betts (L) | MP for predecessor seat of Sheffield Attercliffe. |
| Sheffield, Brightside and Hillsborough | | Labour | | David Blunkett (L) | MP for predecessor seat of Sheffield Brightside. |
| Sheffield, Hallam | | Liberal Democrats | | Nick Clegg (LD) | Party leader; Appointed Deputy Prime Minister on 12 May |
| Sheffield, Heeley | | Labour | | Meg Munn (L Co-op) | |
| Sherwood | | Labour | | Mark Spencer (C) | Gain. Previous incumbent Paddy Tipping did not stand. |
| Shipley | | Conservative | | Philip Davies (C) | |
| Shrewsbury and Atcham | | Conservative | | Daniel Kawczynski (C) | |
| Sittingbourne and Sheppey | | Conservative | | Gordon Henderson (C) | Gain. Notional hold following boundary changes. Previous incumbent Derek Wyatt did not stand. |
| Skipton and Ripon | | Conservative | | Julian Smith (C) | Previous incumbent David Curry did not stand. |
| Sleaford and North Hykeham | | Conservative | | Stephen Phillips (C) | Previous incumbent Douglas Hogg did not stand. |
| Slough | | Labour | | Fiona Mactaggart (L) | |
| Solihull | | Conservative | | Lorely Burt (LD) | Seat held. Notional gain following boundary changes. |
| Somerton and Frome | | Liberal Democrats | | David Heath (LD) | |
| South Antrim | | Democratic Unionist Party | | William McCrea (DUP) | |
| South Basildon and East Thurrock | | Labour | | Stephen Metcalfe (C) | Gain. Defeated Angela Smith, MP for predecessor seat of Basildon. |
| South Cambridgeshire | | Conservative | | Andrew Lansley (C) | |
| South Derbyshire | | Labour | | Heather Wheeler (C) | Gain. Previous incumbent Mark Todd did not stand. |
| South Dorset | | Labour | | Richard Drax (C) | Gain. Defeated incumbent Jim Knight. |
| South Down | | SDLP | | Margaret Ritchie (SDLP) | Previous incumbent Eddie McGrady did not stand. |
| South East Cambridgeshire | | Conservative | | Jim Paice (C) | |
| South East Cornwall | | Liberal Democrats | | Sheryll Murray (C) | Gain. Previous incumbent Colin Breed did not stand. |
| South Holland and The Deepings | | Conservative | | John Hayes (C) | |
| South Leicestershire | | Conservative | | Andrew Robathan (C) | MP for predecessor seat of Blaby. |
| South Norfolk | | Conservative | | Richard Bacon (C) | |
| South Northamptonshire | | Conservative | | Andrea Leadsom (C) | New constituency. |
| South Ribble | | Labour | | Lorraine Fullbrook (C) | Gain. Defeated incumbent David Borrow. |
| South Shields | | Labour | | David Miliband (L) | |
| South Staffordshire | | Conservative | | Gavin Williamson (C) | Previous incumbent Sir Patrick Cormack did not stand. |
| South Suffolk | | Conservative | | Tim Yeo (C) | |
| South Swindon | | Labour | | Robert Buckland (C) | Gain. Defeated incumbent Anne Snelgrove. |
| South Thanet | | Labour | | Laura Sandys (C) | Gain. Defeated incumbent Stephen Ladyman. |
| South West Bedfordshire | | Conservative | | Andrew Selous (C) | |
| South West Devon | | Conservative | | Gary Streeter (C) | |
| South West Hertfordshire | | Conservative | | David Gauke (C) | |
| South West Norfolk | | Conservative | | Liz Truss (C) | Previous incumbent Christopher Fraser did not stand. |
| South West Surrey | | Conservative | | Jeremy Hunt (C) | |
| South West Wiltshire | | Conservative | | Andrew Murrison (C) | MP for predecessor seat of Westbury. |
| Southampton, Itchen | | Labour | | John Denham (L) | |
| Southampton, Test | | Labour | | Alan Whitehead (L) | |
| Southend West | | Conservative | | David Amess (C) | |
| Southport | | Liberal Democrats | | John Pugh (LD) | |
| Spelthorne | | Conservative | | Kwasi Kwarteng (C) | Previous incumbent David Wilshire did not stand. |
| St Albans | | Conservative | | Anne Main (C) | |
| St Austell and Newquay | | Liberal Democrats | | Steve Gilbert (LD) | New constituency. |
| St Helens North | | Labour | | David Watts (L) | |
| St Helens South and Whiston | | Labour | | Shaun Woodward (L) | MP for predecessor seat of St Helens South. |
| St Ives | | Liberal Democrats | | Andrew George (LD) | |
| Stafford | | Labour | | Jeremy Lefroy (C) | Gain. Defeated incumbent David Kidney. |
| Staffordshire Moorlands | | Conservative | | Karen Bradley (C) | Gain. Notional hold following boundary changes. Defeated incumbent Charlotte Atkins. |
| Stalybridge and Hyde | | Labour | | Jonathan Reynolds (L Co-op) | Previous incumbent James Purnell did not stand. |
| Stevenage | | Labour | | Stephen McPartland (C) | Gain. Previous incumbent Barbara Follett did not stand. |
| Stirling | | Labour | | Anne McGuire (L) | |
| Stockport | | Labour | | Ann Coffey (L) | |
| Stockton North | | Labour | | Alex Cunningham (L) | Previous incumbent Frank Cook did not stand. |
| Stockton South | | Labour | | James Wharton (C) | Gain. Defeated incumbent Dari Taylor. |
| Stoke-on-Trent Central | | Labour | | Tristram Hunt (L) | Previous incumbent Mark Fisher did not stand. |
| Stoke-on-Trent North | | Labour | | Joan Walley (L) | |
| Stoke-on-Trent South | | Labour | | Rob Flello (L) | |
| Stone | | Conservative | | Bill Cash (C) | |
| Stourbridge | | Labour | | Margot James (C) | Gain. Defeated incumbent Lynda Waltho. |
| Strangford | | DUP | | Jim Shannon (DUP) | Seat vacant due to resignation of previous incumbent Iris Robinson. |
| Stratford-on-Avon | | Conservative | | Nadhim Zahawi (C) | Previous incumbent John Maples did not stand. |
| Streatham | | Labour | | Chuka Umunna (L) | Previous incumbent Keith Hill did not stand. |
| Stretford and Urmston | | Labour | | Kate Green (L) | Previous incumbent Beverley Hughes did not stand. |
| Stroud | | Labour | | Neil Carmichael (C) | Gain. Defeated incumbent David Drew. |
| Suffolk Coastal | | Conservative | | Thérèse Coffey (C) | Previous incumbent John Gummer did not stand. |
| Sunderland Central | | Labour | | Julie Elliott (L) | MP for predecessor seat of Sunderland North, Bill Etherington, did not stand. |
| Surrey Heath | | Conservative | | Michael Gove (C) | |
| Sutton and Cheam | | Liberal Democrats | | Paul Burstow (LD) | |
| Sutton Coldfield | | Conservative | | Andrew Mitchell (C) | |
| Swansea East | | Labour | | Siân James (L) | |
| Swansea West | | Labour | | Geraint Davies (L Co-op) | Previous incumbent Alan Williams did not stand. |
=== T ===
| Constituency | Elected MP | Elected party | Previous MP | Previous party | |
| Tamworth | | Labour | | Chris Pincher (C) | Gain. Defeated incumbent Brian Jenkins. |
| Tatton | | Conservative | | George Osborne (C) | |
| Taunton Deane | | Liberal Democrats | | Jeremy Browne (LD) | MP for predecessor seat of Taunton. |
| Telford | | Labour | | David Wright (L) | |
| Tewkesbury | | Conservative | | Laurence Robertson (C) | |
| Thirsk and Malton | | Conservative | | Anne McIntosh (C) | Formerly MP for Vale of York. MP for predecessor seat of Ryedale, John Greenway, did not stand. The poll was the only one postponed. Not a by-election as without a new campaign round. This was due to the death of the UKIP candidate. |
| Thornbury and Yate | | Liberal Democrats | | Steve Webb (LD) | MP for predecessor seat of Northavon. |
| Thurrock | | Labour | | Jackie Doyle-Price (C) | Gain. Previous incumbent Andrew MacKinlay did not stand. |
| Tiverton and Honiton | | Conservative | | Neil Parish (C) | Previous incumbent Angela Browning did not stand. |
| Tonbridge and Malling | | Conservative | | Sir John Stanley (C) | |
| Tooting | | Labour | | Sadiq Khan (L) | |
| Torbay | | Liberal Democrats | | Adrian Sanders (LD) | |
| Torfaen | | Labour | | Paul Murphy (L) | |
| Torridge and West Devon | | Conservative Party | | Geoffrey Cox (C) | |
| Totnes | | Conservative | | Sarah Wollaston (C) | Previous incumbent Anthony Steen did not stand. |
| Tottenham | | Labour | | David Lammy (L) | |
| Truro and Falmouth | | Liberal Democrats | | Sarah Newton (C) | MP for predecessor seat of Truro and St Austell, Matthew Taylor, did not stand. |
| Tunbridge Wells | | Conservative | | Greg Clark (C) | |
| Twickenham | | Liberal Democrats | | Vince Cable (LD) | |
| Tynemouth | | Labour | | Alan Campbell (L) | |
=== U ===
| Constituency | Elected MP | Elected party | Previous MP | Previous party | |
| Upper Bann | | DUP | | David Simpson (DUP) | |
| Uxbridge and South Ruislip | | Conservative | | John Randall (C) | MP for predecessor seat of Uxbridge. |
=== V ===
| Constituency | Elected MP | Elected party | Previous MP | Previous party | |
| Vale of Clwyd | | Labour | | Chris Ruane (L) | |
| Vale of Glamorgan | | Labour | | Alun Cairns (C) | Gain. Previous incumbent John Smith did not stand. |
| Vauxhall | | Labour | | Kate Hoey (L) | |
=== W ===
| Constituency | Elected MP | Elected party | Previous MP | Previous party | |
| Wakefield | | Labour | | Mary Creagh (L) | |
| Wallasey | | Labour | | Angela Eagle (L) | |
| Walsall North | | Labour | | David Winnick (L) | |
| Walsall South | | Labour | | Valerie Vaz (L) | Previous incumbent Bruce George did not stand. |
| Walthamstow | | Labour | | Stella Creasy (L Co-op) | Previous incumbent Neil Gerrard did not stand. |
| Wansbeck | | Labour | | Ian Lavery (L) | Previous incumbent Denis Murphy did not stand. |
| Wantage | | Conservative | | Ed Vaizey (C) | |
| Warley | | Labour | | John Spellar (L) | |
| Warrington North | | Labour | | Helen Jones (L) | |
| Warrington South | | Labour | | David Mowat (C) | Gain. Previous incumbent Helen Southworth did not stand. |
| Warwick and Leamington | | Labour | | Chris White (C) | Gain. Defeated incumbent James Plaskitt. |
| Washington and Sunderland West | | Labour | | Sharon Hodgson (L) | MP for predecessor seat of Gateshead East and Washington West. |
| Watford | | Labour | | Richard Harrington (C) | Gain. Defeated incumbent Claire Ward. |
| Waveney | | Labour | | Peter Aldous (C) | Gain. Defeated incumbent Bob Blizzard. |
| Wealden | | Conservative | | Charles Hendry (C) | |
| Weaver Vale | | Labour | | Graham Evans (C) | Gain. Previous incumbent Mike Hall did not stand. |
| Wellingborough | | Conservative | | Peter Bone (C) | |
| Wells | | Conservative | | Tessa Munt (LD) | Gain. Defeated incumbent David Heathcoat-Amory. |
| Welwyn Hatfield | | Conservative | | Grant Shapps (C) | |
| Wentworth and Dearne | | Labour | | John Healey (L) | MP for predecessor seat of Wentworth. |
| West Aberdeenshire and Kincardine | | Liberal Democrats | | Sir Robert Smith, Bt (LD) | |
| West Bromwich East | | Labour | | Tom Watson (L) | |
| West Bromwich West | | Labour | | Adrian Bailey (L Co-op) | |
| West Dorset | | Conservative | | Oliver Letwin (C) | |
| West Dunbartonshire | | Labour | | Gemma Doyle (L Co-op) | Previous incumbent John McFall did not stand. |
| West Ham | | Labour | | Lyn Brown (L) | |
| West Lancashire | | Labour | | Rosie Cooper (L) | |
| West Suffolk | | Conservative | | Matt Hancock (C) | Previous incumbent Richard Spring did not stand. |
| West Tyrone | | Sinn Féin | | Pat Doherty (SF) | |
| West Worcestershire | | Conservative | | Harriett Baldwin (C) | Previous incumbent Sir Michael Spicer did not stand. |
| Westminster North | | Labour | | Karen Buck (L) | MP for predecessor seat of Regent's Park and Kensington North. |
| Westmorland and Lonsdale | | Liberal Democrats | | Tim Farron (LD) | |
| Weston-super-Mare | | Conservative | | John Penrose (C) | |
| Wigan | | Labour | | Lisa Nandy (L) | Previous incumbent Neil Turner did not stand. |
| Wimbledon | | Conservative | | Stephen Hammond (C) | |
| Winchester | | Liberal Democrats | | Steve Brine (C) | Gain. Previous incumbent Mark Oaten did not stand. |
| Windsor | | Conservative | | Adam Afriyie (C) | |
| Wirral South | | Labour | | Alison McGovern (L) | Previous incumbent Ben Chapman did not stand. |
| Wirral West | | Conservative | | Esther McVey (C) | Gain. Notional hold following boundary changes. Previous incumbent Stephen Hesford did not stand. |
| Witham | | Conservative | | Priti Patel (C) | New constituency. |
| Witney | | Conservative | | David Cameron (C) | Appointed Prime Minister on 11 May |
| Woking | | Conservative | | Jonathan Lord (C) | Previous incumbent Humfrey Malins did not stand. |
| Wokingham | | Conservative | | John Redwood (C) | |
| Wolverhampton North East | | Labour | | Emma Reynolds (L) | Previous incumbent Ken Purchase did not stand. |
| Wolverhampton South East | | Labour | | Pat McFadden (L) | |
| Wolverhampton South West | | Labour | | Paul Uppal (C) | Gain. Defeated incumbent Rob Marris. |
| Worcester | | Labour | | Robin Walker (C) | Gain. Defeated incumbent Michael John Foster. |
| Workington | | Labour | | Tony Cunningham (L) | |
| Worsley and Eccles South | | Labour | | Barbara Keeley (L) | MP for predecessor seat of Worsley. |
| Worthing West | | Conservative | | Sir Peter Bottomley (C) | |
| The Wrekin | | Conservative | | Mark Pritchard (C) | |
| Wrexham | | Labour | | Ian Lucas (L) | |
| Wycombe | | Conservative | | Steve Baker (C) | Previous incumbent Paul Goodman did not stand. |
| Wyre and Preston North | | Conservative | | Ben Wallace (C) | New constituency. Formerly MP for Lancaster and Wyre. |
| Wyre Forest | | Health Concern | | Mark Garnier (C) | Gain. Defeated incumbent Richard Taylor. |
| Wythenshawe and Sale East | | Labour | | Paul Goggins (L) | |
=== Y ===
| Constituency | Elected MP | Elected party | Previous MP | Previous party | |
| Yeovil | | Liberal Democrats | | David Laws (LD) | |
| Ynys Môn (Anglesey) | | Labour | | Albert Owen (L) | |
| York Central | | Labour | | Hugh Bayley (L) | MP for predecessor seat of City of York. |
| York Outer | | Liberal Democrats | | Julian Sturdy (C) | Notional gain following boundary changes. MP for predecessor seat of Vale of York, Anne McIntosh, won in Thirsk and Malton. |

== Changes and by-elections ==
After a general election, changes can occur in the composition of the House of Commons. This happens as a result of the election of Deputy Speakers, by-elections, defections, suspensions or removal of whip.

Technically, MPs cannot resign. However, they can effectively do so by requesting to be appointed as the Crown Steward and Bailiff of the Manor of Northstead or the Crown Steward and Bailiff of the three Chiltern Hundreds of Stoke, Desborough and Burnham, which vacates their seat.

The net outcome of all changes at the dissolution of Parliament resulted in four fewer Conservative MPs, two fewer Labour MPs, one fewer Liberal Democrat MP, four more independent MPs, the addition of one Respect MP and the addition of two UKIP MPs. This resulted in a reduction of the actual government majority from eighty-three to seventy-three. Both Respect and UKIP were previously unrepresented in the fifty-fifth Parliament. This was the first time that candidates standing for UKIP had been elected to the House of Commons.

=== Deputy Speakers ===
Although Deputy Speakers do not resign from their parties, they cease to vote (except to break ties) and they do not participate in party-political activity until the next election.

- Lindsay Hoyle (Lab, Chorley) was elected Chairman of Ways and Means.
- Nigel Evans (Con, Ribble Valley) was elected First Deputy Chairman of Ways and Means and held the position until his resignation on 10 September 2013.
- Dawn Primarolo (Lab, Bristol South) was elected Second Deputy Chairman of Ways and Means.
- Eleanor Laing (Con, Epping Forest) was elected First Deputy Chairman of Ways and Means on 16 October 2013.

=== By-elections ===
By-elections are held for seats that become vacant, although if a vacancy occurs close to a general election, the seat may remain vacant for the remainder of the Parliament.

| By-election | Date | Incumbent | Party | Cause | Winner | Party |
|---|---|---|---|---|---|---|
| Oldham East and Saddleworth | 13 January 2011 | Phil Woolas | Labour | General election result declared null and void due to illegal election practices during the campaign. | Debbie Abrahams | Labour |
| Barnsley Central | 3 March 2011 | Eric Illsley | Labour | Resigned shortly before receiving a prison sentence for his part in the parliamentary expenses scandal. | Dan Jarvis | Labour |
| Barnsley Central | 3 March 2011 | Eric Illsley | Independent | Resigned shortly before receiving a prison sentence for his part in the parliamentary expenses scandal. | Dan Jarvis | Labour |
| Leicester South | 5 May 2011 | Peter Soulsby | Labour | Resigned to contest the Leicester mayoralty. | Jon Ashworth | Labour Co-op |
| Belfast West | 9 June 2011 | Gerry Adams | Sinn Féin | Resigned to contest Louth in the 2011 Irish general election. | Paul Maskey | Sinn Féin |
| Inverclyde | 30 June 2011 | David Cairns | Labour | Death from acute pancreatitis | Iain McKenzie | Labour |
| Feltham and Heston | 15 December 2011 | Alan Keen | Labour Co-op | Death (cancer) | Seema Malhotra | Labour Co-op |
| Bradford West | 29 March 2012 | Marsha Singh | Labour | Resignation (ill health) | George Galloway | Respect |
| Corby | 15 November 2012 | Louise Mensch | Conservative | Resigned to relocate to the United States. | Andy Sawford | Labour Co-op |
| Manchester Central | 15 November 2012 | Tony Lloyd | Labour | Resigned to contest the Police and Crime Commissioner elections. | Lucy Powell | Labour Co-op |
| Cardiff South and Penarth | 15 November 2012 | Alun Michael | Labour Co-op | Resigned to contest the Police and Crime Commissioner elections. | Stephen Doughty | Labour Co-op |
| Croydon North | 29 November 2012 | Malcolm Wicks | Labour | Death (cancer) | Steve Reed | Labour Co-op |
| Middlesbrough | 29 November 2012 | Stuart Bell | Labour | Death (cancer) | Andy McDonald | Labour |
| Rotherham | 29 November 2012 | Denis MacShane | Labour | Resigned after parliamentary inquiry into his falsification of expenses claims. | Sarah Champion | Labour |
| Eastleigh | 28 February 2013 | Chris Huhne | Liberal Democrats | Resigned shortly before receiving a prison sentence for perverting the course of justice. | Mike Thornton | Liberal Democrats |
| Mid Ulster | 7 March 2013 | Martin McGuinness | Sinn Féin | Resigned to end his dual mandate with the Northern Ireland Assembly. | Francie Molloy | Sinn Féin |
| South Shields | 2 May 2013 | David Miliband | Labour | Resigned to become head of the International Rescue Committee | Emma Lewell-Buck | Labour |
| Wythenshawe and Sale East | 13 February 2014 | Paul Goggins | Labour | Death (brain haemorrhage) | Mike Kane | Labour |
| Newark | 5 June 2014 | Patrick Mercer | Conservative | Resignation after allegedly asking questions in Parliament for money. | Robert Jenrick | Conservative |
| Newark | 5 June 2014 | Patrick Mercer | Independent | Resignation after allegedly asking questions in Parliament for money. | Robert Jenrick | Conservative |
| Heywood and Middleton | 9 October 2014 | Jim Dobbin | Labour Co-op | Death (acute alcohol toxicity) | Liz McInnes | Labour |
| Clacton | 9 October 2014 | Douglas Carswell | Conservative | Resigned to recontest their seats for UKIP. | Douglas Carswell | UKIP |
| Rochester and Strood | 20 November 2014 | Mark Reckless | Conservative | Resigned to recontest their seats for UKIP. | Mark Reckless | UKIP |

=== Defections, suspensions and resignations ===
In some situations, the label which MPs sit in the House of Commons under can change. When this happens, MPs often become independents.

| Name | Date | From | To | Constituency | Reason |
|---|---|---|---|---|---|
| Eric Illsley | 19 May 2010 | Labour | Independent | Barnsley Central | Withdrawn from Labour whip after being charged with false accounting as part of the parliamentary expenses scandal. |
| Eric Illsley | 8 February 2011 | Independent | Seat Vacant | Barnsley Central | Resigned because of criminal conviction. |
| Denis MacShane | 14 October 2010 | Labour | Independent | Rotherham | Suspended from Labour after police investigation. |
| Denis MacShane | 4 July 2012 | Independent | Labour | Rotherham | Reinstated. |
| Denis MacShane | 2 November 2012 | Labour | Seat Vacant | Rotherham | Resigned because of police investigation. |
| Eric Joyce | 23 February 2012 | Labour | Independent | Falkirk | Suspended from Labour after arrest on suspicion of assault. Later resigned from Labour entirely. |
| Nadine Dorries | 6 November 2012 | Conservative | Independent | Mid Bedfordshire | Suspended from the Conservatives after her unauthorised participation in a TV programme. |
| Nadine Dorries | 8 May 2013 | Independent | Conservative | Mid Bedfordshire | Reinstated. |
| Patrick Mercer | 31 May 2013 | Conservative | Independent | Newark | Resigned from Conservatives after being the subject of a journalistic sting exploring his conduct regarding lobbying companies. |
| Patrick Mercer | 29 April 2014 | Independent | Seat Vacant | Newark | Resigned due to commons suspension |
| Mike Hancock | 3 June 2013 | Liberal Democrats | Independent | Portsmouth South | Resigned whip ahead of court case involving sexual offence allegations. Suspended from party on 22 January 2014 and resigned from it completely on 17 September. |
| David Ward | 17 July 2013 | Liberal Democrats | Independent | Bradford East | Suspended from party after questioning the existence of Israel and later refusing to apologise. |
| David Ward | 13 September 2013 | Independent | Liberal Democrats | Bradford East | Reinstated. |
| Nigel Evans | 10 September 2013 | Conservative | Independent | Ribble Valley | Resigned as First Deputy Chairman of Ways and Means after being charged with sexual offences. Did not seek return of the Conservative whip. |
| Nigel Evans | 28 April 2014 | Independent | Conservative | Ribble Valley | Rejoined party after being cleared of all charges. |
| Jack Straw | 22 February 2015 | Labour | Independent | Blackburn | Suspended from party after allegations that they offered access to policy-makers and ambassadors in return for payment. |
| Malcolm Rifkind | 23 February 2015 | Conservative | Independent | Kensington | Suspended from party after allegations that they offered access to policy-makers and ambassadors in return for payment. |

== Progression of Government majority and party totals ==
| Date | Event | Con | Lib Dem | Working Majority | Lab | DUP | SNP | PC | SDLP | GRN | APNI | Ind Unionist | UKIP | Respect | Ind | SF | Spkr | Vacant |
|---|---|---|---|---|---|---|---|---|---|---|---|---|---|---|---|---|---|---|
| 6 May 2010 | Elected in General Election | 306 | 57 | 83 | 258 | 8 | 6 | 3 | 3 | 1 | 1 | 1 | 0 | 0 | 0 | 5 | 1 | 0 |
| 19 May 2010 | Illsey (Lab), loses whip | 306 | 57 | 83 | 257 | 8 | 6 | 3 | 3 | 1 | 1 | 1 | 0 | 0 | 1 | 5 | 1 | 0 |
| 14 October 2010 | MacShane (Lab), loses whip | 306 | 57 | 83 | 256 | 8 | 6 | 3 | 3 | 1 | 1 | 1 | 0 | 0 | 1 | 5 | 1 | 0 |
| 5 November 2010 | Result in Oldham East and Saddleworth declared void | 306 | 57 | 85 | 255 | 8 | 6 | 3 | 3 | 1 | 1 | 1 | 0 | 0 | 2 | 5 | 1 | 1 |
| 13 January 2011 | Abrahams (Lab) elected in Oldham East and Saddleworth | 306 | 57 | 83 | 256 | 8 | 6 | 3 | 3 | 1 | 1 | 1 | 0 | 0 | 1 | 5 | 1 | 0 |
| 26 January 2011 | Adams (SF), resigns seat | 306 | 57 | 85 | 256 | 8 | 6 | 3 | 3 | 1 | 1 | 1 | 0 | 0 | 2 | 4 | 1 | 1 |
| 8 February 2011 | Illsey (ind) resigns seat | 306 | 57 | 87 | 256 | 8 | 6 | 3 | 3 | 1 | 1 | 1 | 0 | 0 | 1 | 4 | 1 | 2 |
| 3 March 2011 | Jarvis (Lab), elected in Barnsley Central | 306 | 57 | 85 | 257 | 8 | 6 | 3 | 3 | 1 | 1 | 1 | 0 | 0 | 1 | 4 | 1 | 1 |
| 1 April 2011 | Soulsby (Lab), resigns seat | 306 | 57 | 87 | 256 | 8 | 6 | 3 | 3 | 1 | 1 | 1 | 0 | 0 | 1 | 4 | 1 | 2 |
| 5 May 2011 | Ashworth (Lab), elected in Leicester South | 306 | 57 | 85 | 257 | 8 | 6 | 3 | 3 | 1 | 1 | 1 | 0 | 0 | 1 | 4 | 1 | 1 |
| 9 May 2011 | Cairns (Lab), dies | 306 | 57 | 87 | 256 | 8 | 6 | 3 | 3 | 1 | 1 | 1 | 0 | 0 | 1 | 4 | 1 | 2 |
| 9 June 2011 | Maskey (SF), elected in Belfast West. | 306 | 57 | 85 | 256 | 8 | 6 | 3 | 3 | 1 | 1 | 1 | 0 | 0 | 1 | 5 | 1 | 1 |
| 30 June 2011 | McKenzie (Lab), elected in Inverclyde. | 306 | 57 | 83 | 257 | 8 | 6 | 3 | 3 | 1 | 1 | 1 | 0 | 0 | 1 | 5 | 1 | 0 |
| 10 November 2011 | Keen (Lab), dies. | 306 | 57 | 85 | 256 | 8 | 6 | 3 | 3 | 1 | 1 | 1 | 0 | 0 | 1 | 5 | 1 | 1 |
| 15 December 2011 | Malhotra (Lab), elected in Feltham and Heston. | 306 | 57 | 83 | 257 | 8 | 6 | 3 | 3 | 1 | 1 | 1 | 0 | 0 | 1 | 5 | 1 | 0 |
| 23 February 2012 | Joyce (Lab), loses whip. | 306 | 57 | 83 | 256 | 8 | 6 | 3 | 3 | 1 | 1 | 1 | 0 | 0 | 1 | 5 | 1 | 0 |
| 2 March 2012 | Singh (Lab) (Bradford West), resigns. | 306 | 57 | 85 | 255 | 8 | 6 | 3 | 3 | 1 | 1 | 1 | 0 | 0 | 1 | 5 | 1 | 1 |
| 29 March 2012 | Galloway (Respect), elected in Bradford West. | 306 | 57 | 83 | 255 | 8 | 6 | 3 | 3 | 1 | 1 | 1 | 0 | 1 | 1 | 5 | 1 | 0 |
| 4 July 2012 | MacShane (Ind), regains Lab whip. | 306 | 57 | 83 | 256 | 8 | 6 | 3 | 3 | 1 | 1 | 1 | 0 | 1 | 0 | 5 | 1 | 0 |
| 29 August 2012 | Mensch (Con), resigns. | 305 | 57 | 82 | 256 | 8 | 6 | 3 | 3 | 1 | 1 | 1 | 0 | 1 | 0 | 5 | 1 | 1 |
| 29 September 2012 | Wicks (Lab), dies. | 305 | 57 | 84 | 255 | 8 | 6 | 3 | 3 | 1 | 1 | 1 | 0 | 1 | 0 | 5 | 1 | 2 |
| 13 October 2012 | Bell (Lab), dies. | 305 | 57 | 86 | 254 | | | | | | | | | 1 | 0 | 5 | 1 | 3 |
| 22 October 2012 | Lloyd (Lab), resigns. | 305 | 57 | 88 | 253 | 8 | 6 | 3 | 3 | 1 | 1 | 1 | 0 | 1 | 0 | 5 | 1 | 4 |
| 22 October 2012 | Michael (Lab), resigns. | 305 | 57 | 90 | 252 | 8 | 6 | 3 | 3 | 1 | 1 | 1 | 0 | 1 | 0 | 5 | 1 | 5 |
| 2 November 2012 | MacShane (Lab), resigns. | 305 | 57 | 92 | 251 | 8 | 6 | 3 | 3 | 1 | 1 | 1 | 0 | 1 | 0 | 5 | 1 | 6 |
| 6 November 2012 | Dorries (Con), loses whip. | 305 | 57 | 90 | 251 | 8 | 6 | 3 | 3 | 1 | 1 | 1 | 0 | 1 | 1 | 5 | 1 | 6 |
| 15 November 2012 | Sawford (Lab), elected in Corby. | 305 | 57 | 89 | 252 | 8 | 6 | 3 | 3 | 1 | 1 | 1 | 0 | 1 | 1 | 5 | 1 | 5 |
| 15 November 2012 | Powell (Lab) elected in Manchester Central. | 305 | 57 | 87 | 253 | 8 | 6 | 3 | 3 | 1 | 1 | 1 | 0 | 1 | 1 | 5 | 1 | 4 |
| 15 November 2012 | Doughty (Lab), elected in Cardiff South and Penarth. | 305 | 57 | 85 | 254 | | | | | | | | | 1 | 1 | 5 | 1 | 3 |
| 29 November 2012 | Reed (Lab), elected in Croydon North. | 305 | 57 | 83 | 255 | 8 | 6 | 3 | 3 | 1 | 1 | 1 | 0 | 1 | 1 | 5 | 1 | 2 |
| 29 November 2012 | McDonald (Lab), elected in Middlesbrough. | 305 | 57 | 81 | 256 | 8 | 6 | 3 | 3 | 1 | 1 | 1 | 0 | 1 | 1 | 5 | 1 | 1 |
| 29 November 2012 | Champion (Lab), elected in Rotherham. | 305 | 57 | 79 | 257 | 8 | 6 | 3 | 3 | 1 | 1 | 1 | 0 | 1 | 1 | 5 | 1 | 0 |
| 2 January 2013 | McGuinness (SF), resigns. | 305 | 57 | 81 | 258 | 8 | 6 | 3 | 3 | 1 | 1 | 1 | 0 | 1 | 1 | 4 | 1 | 1 |
| 5 February 2013 | Huhne (Lib Dem), resigns. | 305 | 56 | 79 | 258 | 8 | 6 | 3 | 3 | 1 | 1 | 1 | 0 | 1 | 1 | 4 | 1 | 2 |
| 28 February 2013 | Thornton (Lib Dem), elected in Eastleigh. | 305 | 57 | 81 | 258 | 8 | 6 | 3 | 3 | 1 | 1 | 1 | 0 | 1 | 1 | 4 | 1 | 1 |
| 7 March 2013 | Molloy (SF), elected in Mid Ulster. | 305 | 57 | 79 | 258 | 8 | 6 | 3 | 3 | 1 | 1 | 1 | 0 | 1 | 1 | 5 | 1 | 0 |
| 15 April 2013 | D Miliband (Lab), resigns. | 305 | 57 | 81 | 257 | 8 | 6 | 3 | 3 | 1 | 1 | 1 | 0 | 1 | 1 | 5 | 1 | 1 |
| 2 May 2013 | Lewell-Buck (Lab), elected in South Shields. | 305 | 57 | 79 | 258 | 8 | 6 | 3 | 3 | 1 | 1 | 1 | 0 | 1 | 1 | 5 | 1 | 0 |
| 8 May 2013 | Dorries, regains Con whip. | 306 | 57 | 81 | 258 | 8 | 6 | 3 | 3 | 1 | 1 | 1 | 0 | 1 | 0 | 5 | 1 | 0 |
| 31 May 2013 | Mercer (Con), resigns whip. | 305 | 57 | 79 | 258 | 8 | 6 | 3 | 3 | 1 | 1 | 1 | 0 | 1 | 1 | 5 | 1 | 0 |
| 3 June 2013 | Hancock (Lib Dem), resigns whip. | 305 | 56 | 77 | 258 | 8 | 6 | 3 | 3 | 1 | 1 | 1 | 0 | 1 | 2 | 5 | 1 | 0 |
| 17 July 2013 | Ward (Lib Dem) (Bradford East), loses whip. | 305 | 55 | 75 | 258 | 8 | 6 | 3 | 3 | 1 | 1 | 1 | 0 | 1 | 3 | 5 | 1 | 0 |
| 10 September 2013 | Evans (Con), loses whip. | 304 | 55 | 73 | 258 | 8 | 6 | 3 | 3 | 1 | 1 | 1 | 0 | 1 | 4 | 5 | 1 | 0 |
| 13 September 2013 | Ward (Ind), regains Lib Dem whip. | 304 | 56 | 75 | 258 | 8 | 6 | 3 | 3 | 1 | 1 | 1 | 0 | 1 | 3 | 5 | 1 | 0 |
| 7 January 2014 | Goggins (Lab), dies. | 304 | 56 | 77 | 257 | 8 | 6 | 3 | 3 | 1 | 1 | 1 | 0 | 1 | 3 | 5 | 1 | 0 |
| 13 February 2014 | Kane (Lab), elected in Wythenshawe and Sale East. | 304 | 56 | 75 | 258 | 8 | 6 | 3 | 3 | 1 | 1 | 1 | 0 | 1 | 3 | 5 | 1 | 0 |
| 28 April 2014 | Evans, regains Con whip | 305 | 56 | 77 | 258 | 8 | 6 | 3 | 3 | 1 | 1 | 1 | 0 | 1 | 2 | 5 | 1 | 0 |
| 30 April 2014 | Mercer (Ind), resigns. | 305 | 56 | 77 | 258 | 8 | 6 | 3 | 3 | 1 | 1 | 1 | 0 | 1 | 1 | 5 | 1 | 1 |
| 5 June 2014 | Jenrick (Con), elected in Newark | 306 | 56 | 79 | 258 | 8 | 6 | 3 | 3 | 1 | 1 | 1 | 0 | 1 | 1 | 5 | 1 | 0 |
| 28 August 2014 | Carswell (Con), defected to UKIP and resigns | 305 | 56 | 78 | 258 | 8 | 6 | 3 | 3 | 1 | 1 | 1 | 0 | 1 | 1 | 5 | 1 | 1 |
| 6 September 2014 | Dobbin (Lab), dies | 305 | 56 | 80 | 257 | 8 | 6 | 3 | 3 | 1 | 1 | 1 | 0 | 1 | 1 | 5 | 1 | 2 |
| 27 September 2014 | Reckless (Con), defected to UKIP and resigns | 304 | 56 | 81 | 257 | 8 | 6 | 3 | 3 | 1 | 1 | 1 | 0 | 1 | 1 | 5 | 1 | 3 |
| 9 October 2014 | McInnes (Lab), elected in Heywood and Middleton | 304 | 56 | 79 | 258 | 8 | 6 | 3 | 3 | 1 | 1 | 1 | 0 | 1 | 1 | 5 | 1 | 2 |
| 9 October 2014 | Carswell (UKIP), elected in Clacton | 304 | 56 | 77 | 258 | 8 | 6 | 3 | 3 | 1 | 1 | 1 | 1 | 1 | 1 | 5 | 1 | 1 |
| 20 November 2014 | Reckless (UKIP), elected in Rochester and Strood | 304 | 56 | 75 | 258 | 8 | 6 | 3 | 3 | 1 | 1 | 1 | 2 | 1 | 1 | 5 | 1 | 0 |
| 22 February 2015 | Straw (Lab), loses whip | 304 | 56 | 75 | 257 | 8 | 6 | 3 | 3 | 1 | 1 | 1 | 2 | 1 | 2 | 5 | 1 | 0 |
| 23 February 2015 | Rifkind (Con), loses whip | 303 | | 73 | 257 | 8 | 6 | 3 | 3 | 1 | 1 | 1 | 2 | | 3 | 5 | 1 | 0 |

== See also ==
- List of MPs for constituencies in Northern Ireland 2010–15
- List of MPs for constituencies in Scotland 2010–15
- List of MPs for constituencies in England 2010–15
- List of MPs for constituencies in Wales 2010–15
- List of United Kingdom MPs by seniority, 2010–15
- Category:UK MPs 2010–2015
