= Ronnie Cowan (politician) =

Scottish National Party politician (born 1959)

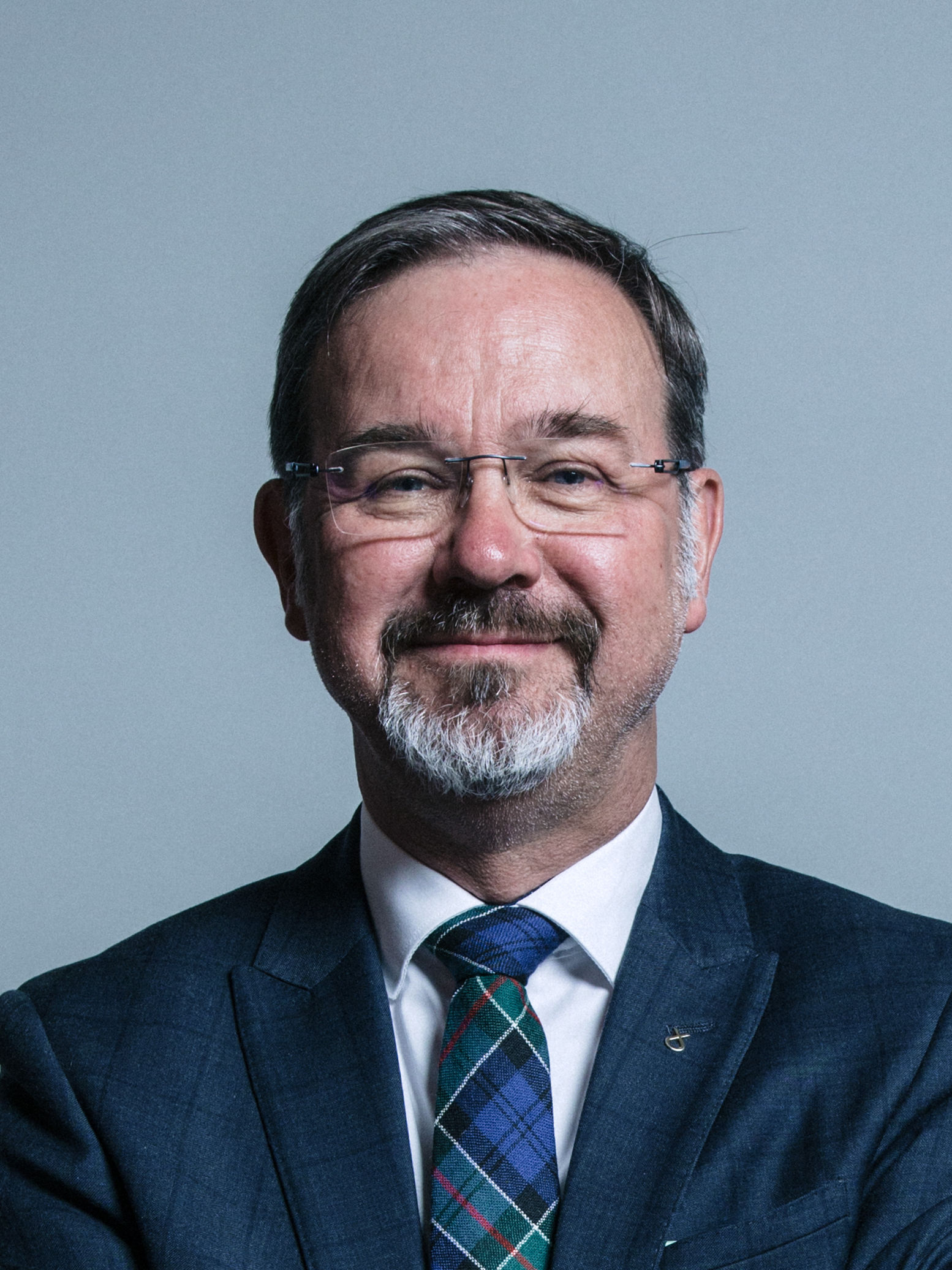
- Official portrait, 2017

Member of Parliament for Inverclyde
- In office 7 May 2015 – 30 May 2024
- Preceded by: Iain McKenzie
- Succeeded by: Constituency abolished

Personal details
- Born: Ronald Jack Cowan; 6 September 1959 (age 67) Inverclyde, Scotland
- Party: Scottish National Party

Ronald Jack Cowan (born 6 September 1959) is a Scottish politician and member of the Scottish National Party. He served as the Member of Parliament (MP) for Inverclyde from 2015 until 2024.

== Early life and career ==
Cowan was born in Greenock to Jimmy Cowan, a former Greenock Morton and Scotland footballer, and his wife, May. He was educated at Greenock Academy and, despite growing up in a Labour Party-supporting household, joined the Scottish National Party at the age of 16. After leaving school, Cowan worked as a trainee computer operator at Playtex in Port Glasgow.

Before standing for parliament, Cowan was the owner of an IT service company. During the campaign for the 2014 Scottish independence referendum, he ran the official "Yes" campaign in Inverclyde.

== Political career ==
At the 2015 election, Cowan overturned the 5,838-vote majority of incumbent Labour MP Iain McKenzie and turned it into a 11,063 majority for the SNP.

He was re-elected in the snap election of 2017, but saw his majority significantly reduced to just 384 votes. At the 2019 election, Cowan increased his majority to 7,512.

In 2019, Cowan voted in favor of equal gay rights. He is regarded as a critic of the gambling industry and has led a debate in Westminster highlighting harm caused by gambling advertising in sport.

Cowan was the SNP spokesperson for Infrastructure & Manufacturing at Westminster. He currently sits on the Public Administration and Constitutional Affairs Committee and has previously sat on the Transport Committee and Procedure Committee. He serves as Chair of the All-Party Parliamentary Group (APPG) on Industrial Hemp and CBD Products, as well as Vice Chair of the APPGs for Gambling Related Harm, Medical Cannabis under Prescription, and Commercial Sexual Exploitation.

Cowan is a trustee of Intractable Epilepsy and Man On! Inverclyde.

Parliament of the United Kingdom
| Preceded by Iain McKenzie | Member of Parliament for Inverclyde; 2015–present | Incumbent |
