= David Cairns (politician, born 1966) =

Scottish politician

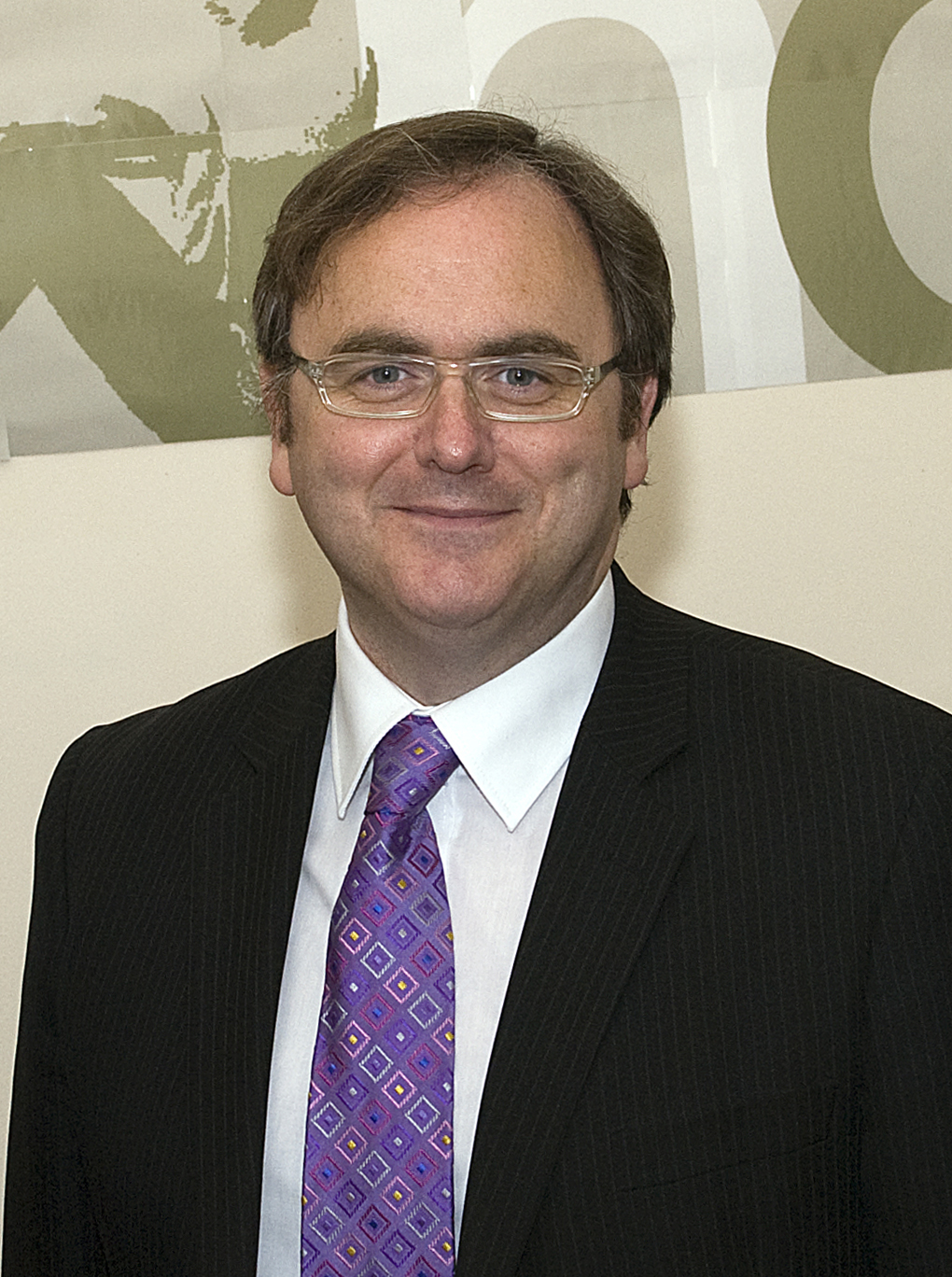
- Cairns in 2010

Minister of State for Scotland (Note: Parliamentary Under-Secretary of State (2005–07))
- In office 11 May 2005 – 16 September 2008
- Prime Minister: Tony Blair; Gordon Brown
- Preceded by: Anne McGuire
- Succeeded by: Ann McKechin (as Parliamentary Under-Secretary of State for Scotland)

Member of Parliament for Inverclyde Greenock and Inverclyde (2001–2005)
- In office 7 June 2001 – 9 May 2011
- Preceded by: Norman Godman
- Succeeded by: Iain McKenzie

Personal details
- Born: 7 August 1966 Greenock, Renfrewshire, Scotland
- Died: 9 May 2011 (aged 44) Hampstead, London, England
- Party: Labour
- Domestic partner: Dermot Kehoe
- Education: Pontifical Gregorian University

John David Cairns (7 August 1966 – 9 May 2011) was a Scottish politician who served as Minister of State for Scotland from 2005 to 2008. A member of Scottish Labour Party, he was Member of Parliament (MP) for Inverclyde, formerly Greenock and Inverclyde, from 2001 until his death in 2011.

== Early life ==
Cairns was born and raised in Greenock. He attended Notre Dame High School in the town, before training for the Roman Catholic priesthood at the Pontifical Gregorian University in Rome. He continued his studies at the Franciscan International Centre in Canterbury.

From 1991 to 1994 he served as a priest in Clapham. He left the priesthood in 1994 and became director of the Christian Socialist Movement. In 1997 he became a research assistant to newly elected Labour MP, Siobhain McDonagh until he himself became an MP in 2001. In 1998 he was elected as a councillor in the London Borough of Merton where he served until 2002.

== Parliamentary career ==
Cairns had ambitions to enter House of Commons but was barred due to the Removal of Clergy Disqualification Act 1801 and the Roman Catholic Relief Act 1829 which prevented present or former Catholic priests from being elected to Parliament. To rectify this, Siobhain McDonagh MP introduced the House of Commons Disqualification (Amendment) Bill in Parliament on 16 June 1999, but the bill failed. The government subsequently introduced the House of Commons (Removal of Clergy Disqualification) Bill, which removed almost all restrictions on clergy of whatever denomination from sitting in the House of Commons. The only exception is the 26 Church of England (Anglican) bishops who sit as Lords Spiritual in the House of Lords, as a person may not sit in both Houses at once. The bill passed on 11 May 2001.

Cairns had already been selected as the Labour candidate in his home town following the retirement of Norman Godman. He was elected as the Labour MP for Greenock and Inverclyde at the 2001 general election with a majority of 9,890, becoming the first person born in Greenock to represent it in Parliament. He made his maiden speech on 4 July 2001.

Cairns was appointed as the Parliamentary Private Secretary to the Minister of State at the Department for Work and Pensions Malcolm Wicks in 2003, and following the 2005 general election, at which, due to the redrawing of boundaries his constituency was abolished and replaced with a larger Inverclyde constituency, he became a member of the Labour government as the Parliamentary Under-Secretary of State for Scotland. He then had the Northern Ireland Office added to his responsibilities and in 2007 he became the Minister of State for Scotland. He played a high profile role in the media as the principal defender of Scotland's role in the United Kingdom in opposition to the movement for Scottish independence. Cairns was Chair of Labour Friends of Israel, and while he gave up the position when becoming a junior minister, he remained a committed member of the group.

On 16 September 2008, Cairns resigned from the government during arguments in the Labour party over Gordon Brown's leadership, saying that the time had come to "allow a leadership debate to run its course". He was the only minister to resign after rebel MPs began calling for a leadership contest. The Guardian later called it "a principled decision by a principled politician". In the 2010 general election, Cairns was returned as Member of Parliament for his constituency of Inverclyde with a majority of 14,416, which was an increase on his previous election.

== Personal life and death ==
Cairns was openly gay, and at the time of his death, was in a relationship with Dermot Kehoe.

In March 2011, Cairns was hospitalised in London for acute pancreatitis, and died at Royal Free Hospital on 9 May 2011, at the age of 44.

== See also ==
- James Godfrey MacManaway
- Roman Catholic Church in Scotland

== Notes ==
Parliament of the United Kingdom
Preceded by Norman Godman	Member of Parliament for Greenock and Inverclyde; 2001–2005	Constituency abolished
New constituency	Member of Parliament for Inverclyde; 2005–2011	Succeeded by Iain McKenzie
