= Iain McKenzie =

Scottish politician

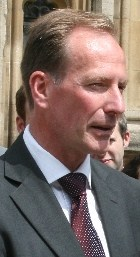
- McKenzie in 2011

Member of Parliament for Inverclyde
- In office 30 June 2011 – 30 March 2015
- Preceded by: David Cairns
- Succeeded by: Ronnie Cowan

Personal details
- Born: 4 April 1959 (age 67) Greenock, Renfrewshire, Scotland
- Party: Scottish Labour
- Spouse: Alison

Iain McKenzie (born 4 April 1959) is a Scottish Labour Party politician, who was formerly the Member of Parliament for Inverclyde. He was elected at the June 2011 by-election, and stood unsuccessfully for re-election in the 2015 general election.

== Early life ==
McKenzie was born and raised in Greenock, Inverclyde's largest town, in the areas of Broomhill and Fancy Farm. A former employee of IBM, he was elected to Inverclyde Council, becoming Leader of the Council in February 2011.

== Parliament ==
McKenzie's election followed the death of David Cairns, who had represented the constituency since 2001. McKenzie made his maiden speech to the House of Commons on 11 July 2011, mainly focusing on employment, opportunity and population growth in his constituency.

McKenzie was one of the few Labour MPs who initially voted against legalising gay marriage in the UK. However, on the third reading of the bill, McKenzie voted for gay marriage as he was satisfied protection for religious groups had been ironed out. He also did not support British involvement in airstrikes in Iraq on 26 September 2014, for which he was sacked as a Parliamentary Private Secretary to the Shadow Defence Secretary, Vernon Coaker.

His Parliamentary biography lists his political interests as 'Europe' and 'employment'.

Parliament of the United Kingdom
Preceded by David Cairns	Member of Parliament for Inverclyde; 2011–2015	Succeeded by Ronnie Cowan
