= Inverclyde (UK Parliament constituency) =

UK Parliament constituency (2005–2024)

Coordinates: 55°54′08″N 4°45′10″W

- Former county constituency for the House of Commons
- Boundary of Inverclyde in Scotland
- Subdivision: Inverclyde
- Major settlements: Gourock, Greenock, Inverkip, Port Glasgow, Wemyss Bay

2005–2024
- Seats: One
- Created from: Greenock and Inverclyde and Renfrewshire West
- Replaced by: Inverclyde and Renfrewshire West

Inverclyde was a parliamentary constituency of the House of Commons of the Parliament of the United Kingdom. It replaced Greenock and Inverclyde and the Port Glasgow and Kilmacolm areas from West Renfrewshire for the 2005 general election.

Iain McKenzie of the Labour Party won the ensuing Inverclyde by-election following the death of the previous Labour MP, David Cairns. At the 2015 general election, the seat was gained by Ronnie Cowan of the Scottish National Party, with a majority of 11,063 votes. At the 2017 snap election, Cowan was re-elected, but with a greatly reduced majority of just 384 votes. However, at the 2019 general election he was re-elected with a significantly increased majority of 7,512 votes, making this a safe seat for the SNP.

Further to the completion of the 2023 Periodic Review of Westminster constituencies, the seat was expanded to include western areas of Renfrewshire, including Bridge of Weir, Houston and Crosslee. As a consequence, the constituency of Inverclyde and Renfrewshire West was contested at the 2024 general election.

== Constituency profile ==
Most of the population live along the Clyde in the north of the seat, and there is a more rural area to the south in Clyde Muirshiel Regional Park. Residents are slightly less affluent than the Scottish and UK averages.

== Boundaries ==
Map of boundaries 2005–2024

The constituency was coterminous with the Inverclyde council area. This includes the towns and villages of Gourock, Greenock, Inverkip, Kilmacolm, Port Glasgow, Quarriers Village and Wemyss Bay.

== Members of Parliament ==
Election	Member	Party
2005	David Cairns	Labour
2011 by-election	Iain McKenzie	Labour
2015	Ronnie Cowan	Scottish National Party

== Elections ==
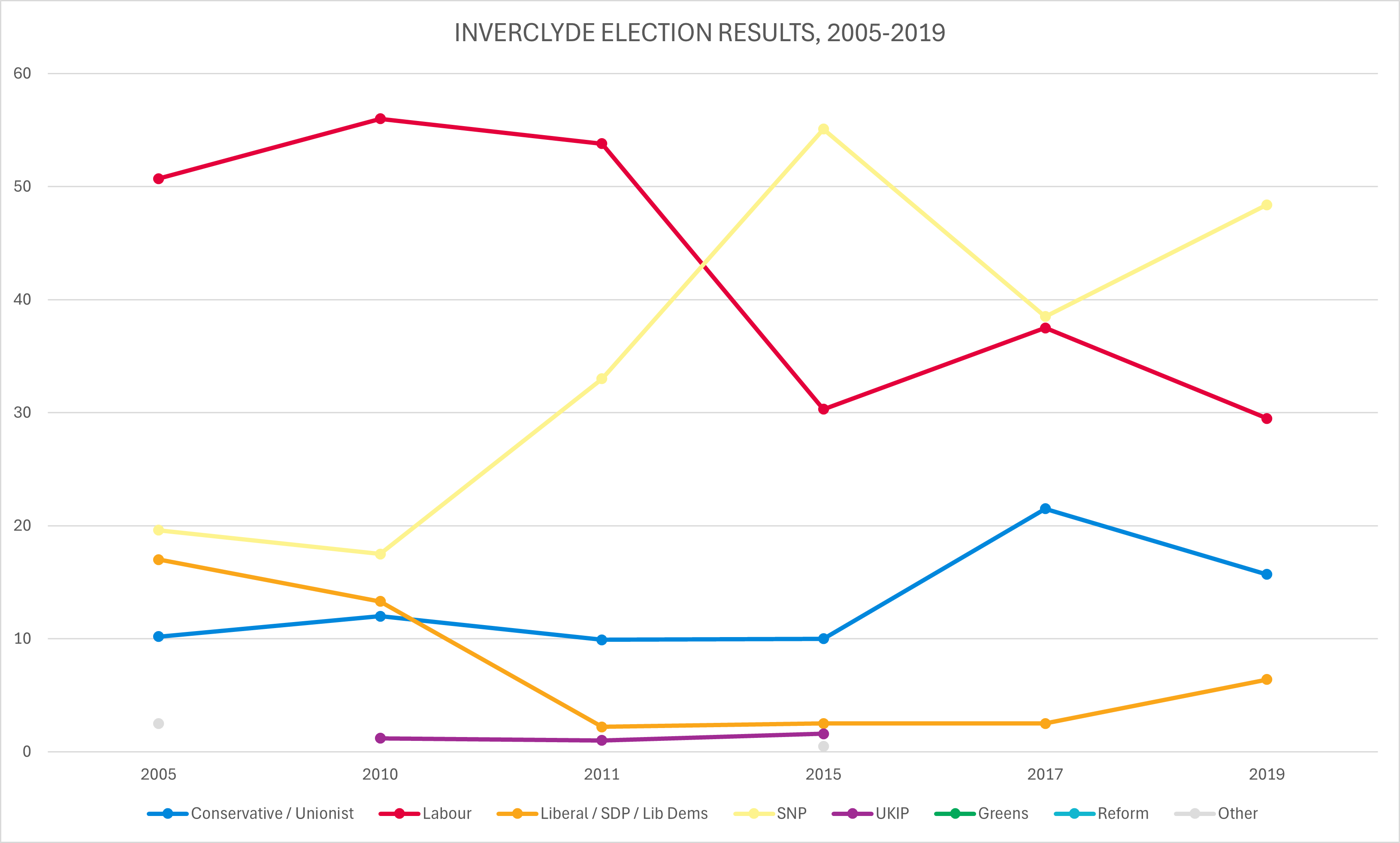
Election results 2005-2019

=== Elections in the 2010s ===
General election 2019: Inverclyde
Party	Candidate	Votes	%	±%
SNP	Ronnie Cowan	19,295	48.4	+9.9
Labour	Martin McCluskey	11,783	29.5	−8.0
Conservative	Haroun Malik	6,265	15.7	−5.8
Liberal Democrats	Jacci Stoyle	2,560	6.4	+3.9
Majority		7,512	18.9	+17.9
Turnout		39,903	65.8	−0.6
SNP hold		Swing	+9.0	

General election 2017: Inverclyde
Party	Candidate	Votes	%	±%
SNP	Ronnie Cowan	15,050	38.5	−16.6
Labour	Martin McCluskey	14,666	37.5	+7.2
Conservative	David Wilson	8,399	21.5	+11.5
Liberal Democrats	David Stevens	978	2.5	0.0
Majority		384	1.0	−23.8
Turnout		39,093	66.4	−8.8
SNP hold		Swing	−11.9	

General election 2015: Inverclyde
Party	Candidate	Votes	%	±%
SNP	Ronnie Cowan	24,585	55.1	+37.6
Labour	Iain McKenzie	13,522	30.3	−25.7
Conservative	George Jabbour	4,446	10.0	−2.0
Liberal Democrats	John Watson	1,106	2.5	−10.8
UKIP	Michael Burrows	715	1.6	+0.4
CISTA	Craig Hamilton	233	0.5	New
Majority		11,063	24.8	N/A^{1}
Turnout		44,607	75.2	+11.8
SNP gain from Labour		Swing	+31.7	

^{1} Change to majority not useful when seat changes hands.

2011 Inverclyde by-election
Party	Candidate	Votes	%	±%
Labour	Iain McKenzie	15,118	53.8	−2.2
SNP	Anne McLaughlin	9,280	33.0	+15.5
Conservative	David Wilson	2,784	9.9	−2.1
Liberal Democrats	Sophie Bridger	627	2.2	−11.1
UKIP	Mitch Sorbie	288	1.0	−0.2
Majority		5,838	20.8	−17.7
Turnout		28,097	45.4	−18.0
Labour hold		Swing	−15.5	

General election 2010: Inverclyde
Party	Candidate	Votes	%	±%
Labour	David Cairns	20,993	56.0	+5.3
SNP	Innes Nelson	6,577	17.5	−2.1
Liberal Democrats	Simon Hutton	5,007	13.3	−3.7
Conservative	David Wilson	4,502	12.0	+1.8
UKIP	Peter Campbell	433	1.2	New
Majority		14,416	38.5	+7.4
Turnout		37,512	63.4	+2.5
Labour hold		Swing		

=== Elections in the 2000s ===
General election 2005: Inverclyde
Party	Candidate	Votes	%	±%
Labour	David Cairns	18,318	50.7	+0.5
SNP	Stuart McMillan	7,059	19.6	+5.6
Liberal Democrats	Douglas Herbison	6,123	17.0	−4.2
Conservative	Gordon Fraser	3,692	10.2	−0.6
Scottish Socialist	Davy Landels	906	2.5	−1.3
Majority		11,259	31.1	
Turnout		36,098	60.9	
Labour win (new seat)				
