= 2011 Inverclyde by-election =

2011 UK Parliamentary by-election

- 30 June 2011

Inverclyde constituency
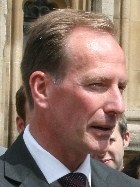

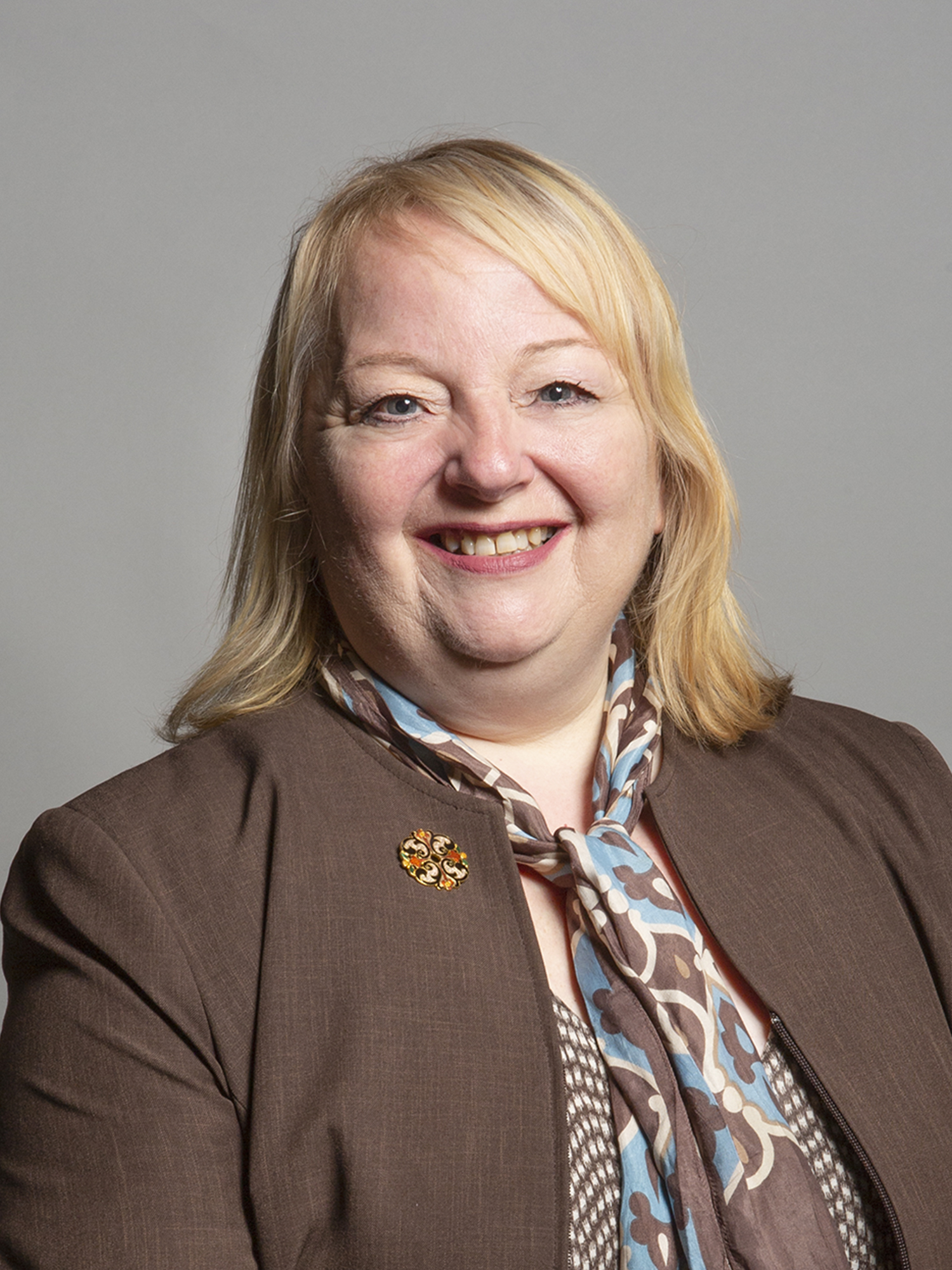
	First party	Second party	Third party
			Con
Candidate	Iain McKenzie	Anne McLaughlin	David Wilson
Party	Labour	SNP	Conservative
Popular vote	15,118	9,280	2,784
Percentage	53.8%	33.0%	9.9%
Swing	▼2.2 pp	▲15.5 pp	▼2.1 pp
MP before election
David Cairns
Labour
Subsequent MP
Iain McKenzie
Labour

A by-election for the United Kingdom parliamentary constituency of Inverclyde was held on 30 June 2011, triggered by the death of incumbent Labour Party MP David Cairns. It was won by Labour candidate Iain McKenzie, who retained the seat for the party.

Cairns had won the constituency in 2010 with a majority of 38.4%, making it a safe Labour seat.

== Background ==
David Cairns, the sitting Labour Party MP, died of acute pancreatitis on 9 May 2011. He had been receiving treatment at the Royal Free Hospital in London since March.

Cairns was first elected to the seat in 2001. He previously worked as the Parliamentary Under-Secretary of State for the Scotland Office, Cairns became Minister of State for Scotland in 2007 but resigned in 2008 in opposition to then-Prime Minister Gordon Brown.

Cairns was re-elected at the 2010 general election with 56.0% of the popular vote in his constituency. The Scottish National Party (SNP) came second, and would require a swing of 19.25% to take the seat, and the Liberal Democrats and Conservatives held third and fourth place respectively with 12-14% of the vote share between them.

== Candidates ==
Nominations closed on 16 June 2011, with five candidates. The Labour Party selected Ian McKenzie a local Councillor since 2003, who has led Inverclyde Council since February 2011 and the only candidate not to have run for any other constituency in the Scottish Election 2011. The Scottish National Party selected Anne McLaughlin, who was an MSP for the Glasgow regional list from 2009–2011. The Conservative Party selected David Wilson, a local councillor and deputy provost of Inverclyde. UKIP candidate Mitch Sorbie contested West Dunbartonshire in the 2010 general election. The Liberal Democrats selected Sophie Bridger, the president of Liberal Youth Scotland.

== Result of by-election and previous general election ==
Election	Political result	Candidate	Party	Votes	%	±%
By-election, 2011; Turnout: 28,097 (45.4%) −18.0	Labour hold Majority: 5,838 (20.8%) −17.6; Swing: −8.9% from Lab to SNP	Iain McKenzie	Labour	15,118	53.8	−2.2
By-election, 2011; Turnout: 28,097 (45.4%) −18.0	Labour hold Majority: 5,838 (20.8%) −17.6; Swing: −8.9% from Lab to SNP	Anne McLaughlin	SNP	9,280	33.0	+15.5
By-election, 2011; Turnout: 28,097 (45.4%) −18.0	Labour hold Majority: 5,838 (20.8%) −17.6; Swing: −8.9% from Lab to SNP	David Wilson	Conservative	2,784	9.9	−2.1
By-election, 2011; Turnout: 28,097 (45.4%) −18.0	Labour hold Majority: 5,838 (20.8%) −17.6; Swing: −8.9% from Lab to SNP	Sophie Bridger	Liberal Democrats	627	2.2	−11.1
By-election, 2011; Turnout: 28,097 (45.4%) −18.0	Labour hold Majority: 5,838 (20.8%) −17.6; Swing: −8.9% from Lab to SNP	Mitch Sorbie	UKIP	288	1.0	−0.2
General Election 2010; Turnout: 37,512 (63.4%) +2.5	Labour hold Majority: 14,416 (38.4%) +7.2; Swing: +2.5% from SNP to Lab	David Cairns	Labour	20,993	56.0	+5.2
General Election 2010; Turnout: 37,512 (63.4%) +2.5	Labour hold Majority: 14,416 (38.4%) +7.2; Swing: +2.5% from SNP to Lab	Innes Nelson	SNP	6,577	17.5	−2.0
General Election 2010; Turnout: 37,512 (63.4%) +2.5	Labour hold Majority: 14,416 (38.4%) +7.2; Swing: +2.5% from SNP to Lab	Simon Hutton	Liberal Democrats	5,007	13.3	−3.6
General Election 2010; Turnout: 37,512 (63.4%) +2.5	Labour hold Majority: 14,416 (38.4%) +7.2; Swing: +2.5% from SNP to Lab	David Wilson	Conservative	4,502	12.0	+1.8
General Election 2010; Turnout: 37,512 (63.4%) +2.5	Labour hold Majority: 14,416 (38.4%) +7.2; Swing: +2.5% from SNP to Lab	Peter Campbell	UKIP	433	1.2	New

== See also ==
- List of United Kingdom by-elections
- Opinion polling for the 2015 United Kingdom general election
