= West Lothian (historic) =

Historic county and lieutenancy area of eastern Scotland

- West Lothian / Linlithgowshire within Scotland
- History
  - Succeeded by: Lothian Region
- Status: Local government county (until 1975)
- Government: County: Linlithgowshire County Council (1890–1925); Westlothian County Council (1925–1927); West Lothian County Council (1927–1975); Formed most of West Lothian district (1975–1996); Forms most of West Lothian council area (1996–)
  - HQ: Linlithgow (county town)

West Lothian, also known as Linlithgowshire (its official name until 1925), is a historic county in the east central Lowlands of Scotland. It is bounded geographically by the Avon to the west and the Almond to the east. It was reshaped significantly following local government reforms in 1975, becoming slightly larger but with major territorial changes: some areas in the north-west were transferred to Falkirk; areas in the north-east were transferred to Edinburgh; and some areas in the south that had formerly been part of Midlothian were added to a new West Lothian District within the Region of Lothian. This then became a standalone local authority area in the most recent major reorganisation enacted in 1996, retaining those same boundaries and name.

The county town was the royal burgh of Linlithgow, but the current council area has its headquarters at Livingston, the development of which as a new town in the second half of the 20th century represents one of the major differences between the historic and modern entities. Towns which were once in West Lothian but no longer are include Bo'ness, Kirkliston and South Queensferry, whilst localities which were only added in the 1970s include Addiewell, East Calder, Kirknewton, Loganlea, Mid Calder and West Calder.

== History ==
Westlothiana ("animal from West Lothian") is a genus of reptile-like tetrapod that lived about 338 million years ago during the latest part of the Visean age of the Carboniferous. Members of the genus bore a superficial resemblance to modern-day lizards. The type specimen was discovered in the East Kirkton Limestone at the East Kirkton Quarry in 1984.

West Lothian was extensively settled in prehistoric times, and several ancient burial sites have been uncovered, such as at Cairnpapple Hill, described as one of Scotland's richest archaeological sites and one of the earlier places of organised worship in the country. There are remains of hillforts on Cockleroy, Peace Knowe, Bowden, Cairnpapple, and Binns Hills. The area was anciently inhabited by Britons of the tribe known as the Votadini or Gododdin. By 83 AD, southern Scotland had been conquered by Romans, who built a road from their fort at Cramond to the eastern end of the Antonine Wall, as well as forts in West Lothian (of which Castle Greg is a known example). The Romans withdrew roughly two centuries later, and the area was left to the Britons until the arrival of Anglo-Saxons in the fifth and sixth centuries, who brought Lothian under the rule of the Kingdom of Northumbria. In later centuries the region was regularly overrun by Gaelic-speaking Scots, and it became permanently part of the Kingdom of Scotland in the 11th century.

In the 11th century, sheriffs were introduced in Scotland by Malcolm II of Scotland. More shires, which would later become counties, were created by Edgar of Scotland, Alexander I of Scotland, and David I of Scotland. The first known reference to a sheriff of Linlithgow occurs in a charter dating from the reign of Malcolm IV, the successor of David I. For a time West Lothian became a constabulary, but it seems to have been made a sheriffdom again during the reign of James III. During the medieval period, settlements such as Linlithgow, Abercorn, Dalmeny and Torphichen grew in importance. Torphichen church is said to have been founded by St. Ninian in about 400AD, a small wooden structure on the site of the present church (itself rebuilt in 1756) and in 1165, the Knights Hospitaller of St John made their Scottish headquarters at Torphichen and the Preceptory stands as testament to their presence.

In pre-industrial times West Lothian was almost entirely agricultural. In the way of heavy industry there was a silver mine at Hilderston near Cairnpapple, a cotton mill at Blackburn, paper mills at Linlithgow, and shallow coal mines around Bathgate and Whitburn. The county was radically changed by the Industrial Revolution, (from about 1760 to sometime between 1820 and 1840) with the opening of deep-pit iron, coal, and shale oil mines, as well as foundries and brickworks, which dramatically altered the landscape. In Bathgate, the Scottish Chemist James Young's discovery of cannel coal in the Boghead area of Bathgate, and his subsequent opening of the Bathgate Chemical Works in 1852 transformed the town and the adjacent landscape. The works were the world's first commercial oil-works, manufacturing paraffin oil and paraffin wax, signalling an end to the rural community of previous centuries. When the cannel coal resources dwindled around 1866, Young and his chemical works started distilling paraffin from much more readily available shale. Shale oil extraction reached its height in the county during the Victorian era. By 1871, there were over 50 oil works producing more than 25 million gallons each year. The five largest oil shale companies (Young's Paraffin Light & Mineral Oil Company, Broxburn Oil Company, Pumpherston Shale Oil Company, Oakbank Oil Company and James Ross & Company Philpstoun Oil Works) were concentrated in West Lothian and would later merge to become Scottish Oils Ltd. The increased industrialisation led to a growing population and the development of numerous villages, such as Pumpherston and Broxburn. The bings (black and pink hills of shale waste) produced by the mining industry, 19 of which still stand in West Lothian, were at first considered blights, but now are thought of as monuments to Scotland's industrial past, and a representation of one appears on the council's coat of arms. The bings are also seen as important for local and national biodiversity.

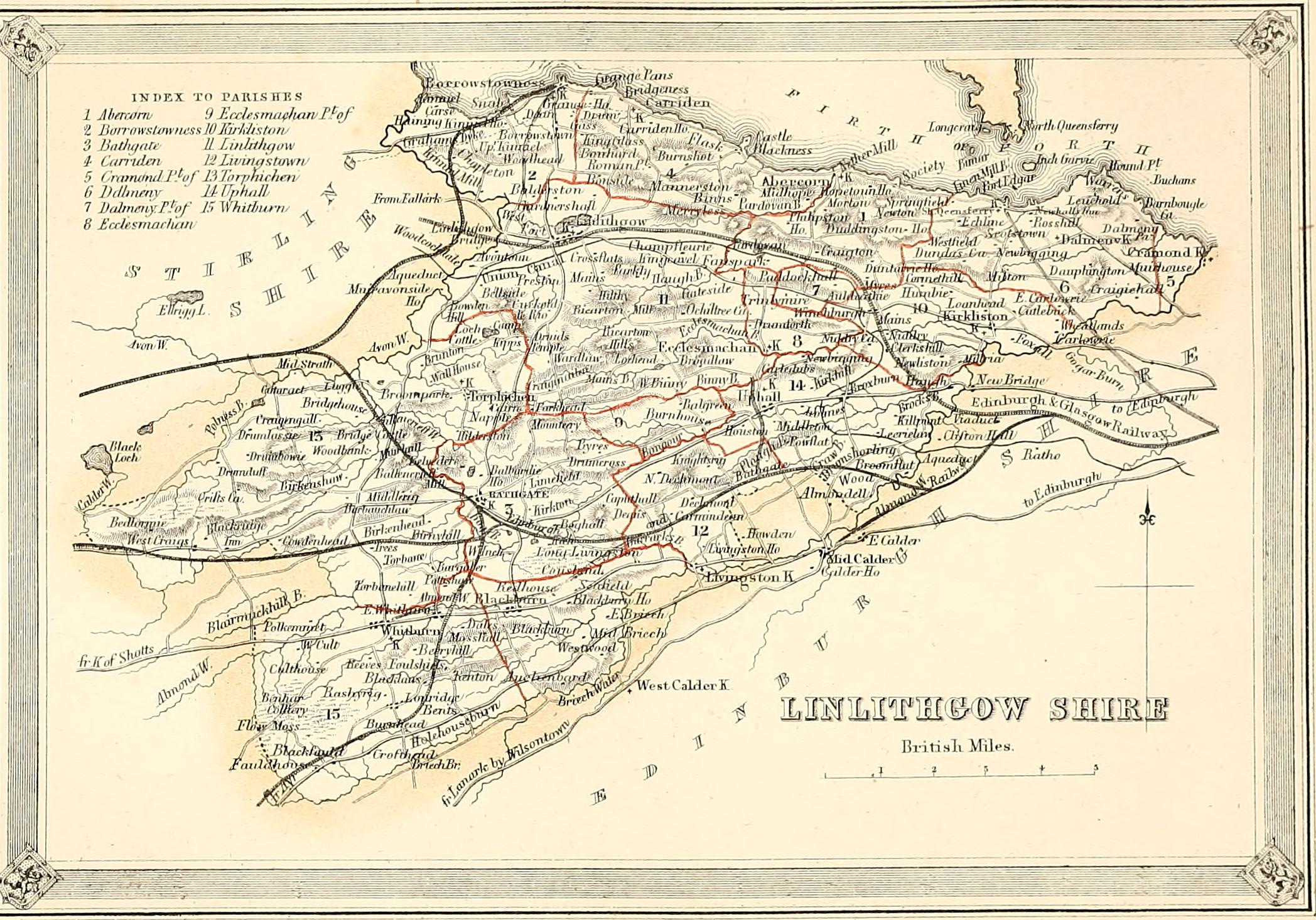
1868 map of Linlithgowshire showing parishes.

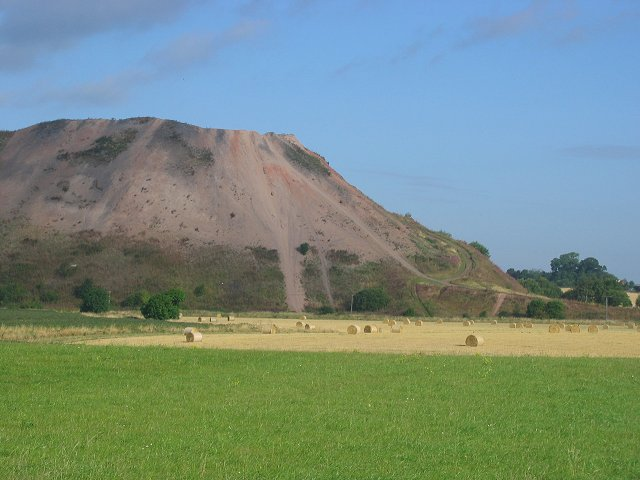
Niddry bing

The Local Government (Scotland) Act 1889 established a uniform system of county councils in Scotland and realigned the boundaries of many of Scotland's counties. Subsequently, West Lothian County Council was created in 1890. The historic county of West Lothian or of Linlithgowshire contained six burghs: Armadale, Bathgate, Bo'ness, Linlithgow, Queensferry, and Whitburn. Areas outside the burghs were administered as districts, of which there were also six: Borrowstounness, Linlithgow, Queensferry, Torphichen & Bathgate, Uphall, and Whitburn & Livingston. The county was also split into twelve parishes; these were not used for administrative purposes after 1930. West Lothian County Council was based at the County Buildings in the High Street, Linlithgow.

Prior to 1925, the county was formally called the "county of Linlithgow" or Linlithgowshire, although the name West Lothian had long been used as an informal alternative name. Following a petition by the county council the government changed the name formally to "Westlothian" under the Westlothian (Bathgate District) Water Order Confirmation Act 1925, which received royal assent on 27 March 1925. In May 1927 the county council resolved that West Lothian should be written as two words rather than one. The Local Government (Scotland) Act 1947 (10 & 11 Geo. 6. c. 43) subsequently gave statutory confirmation for the two word version of the name.

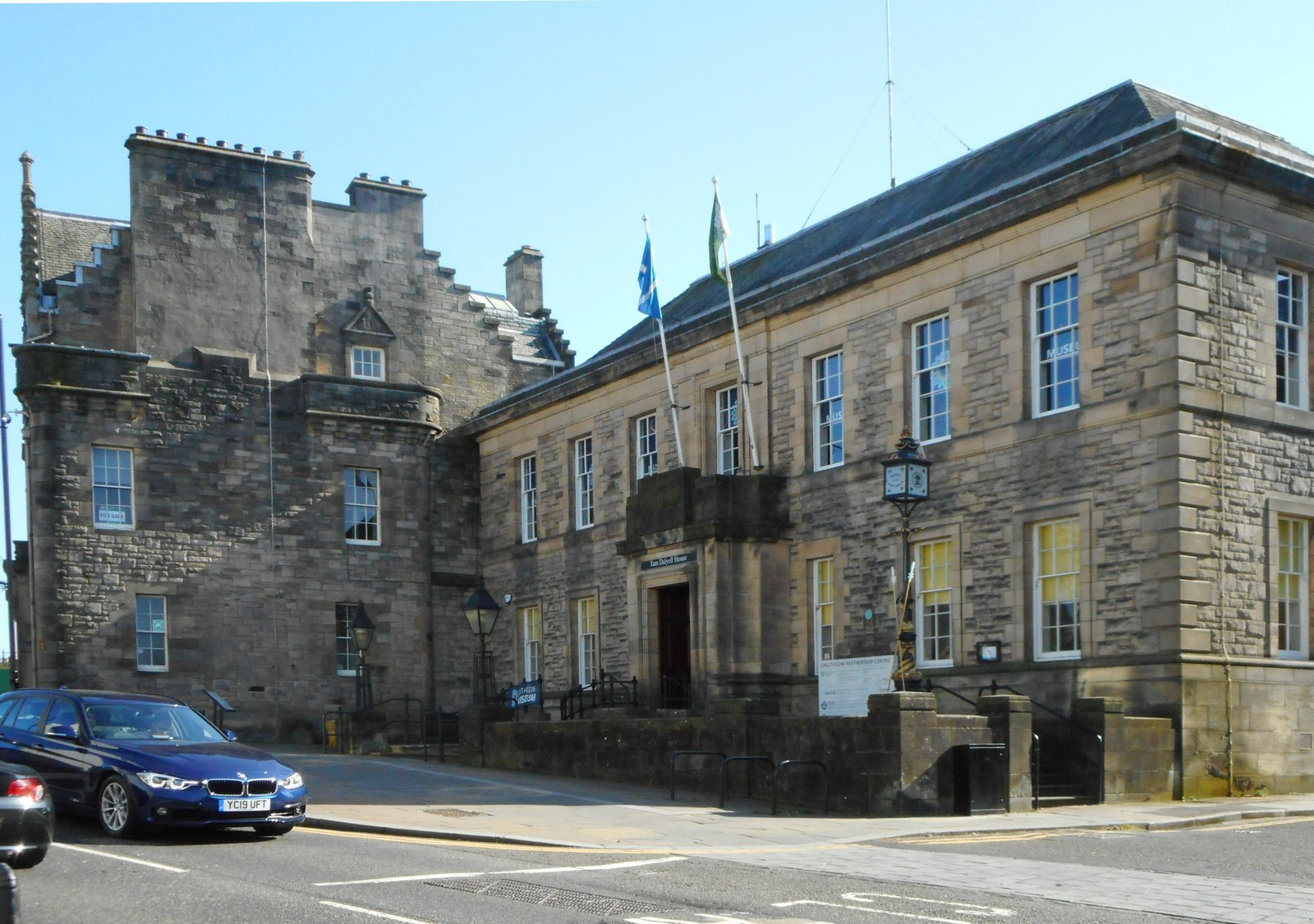
County Buildings in High Street, Linlithgow, the former headquarters of West Lothian County Council between 1940 and 1975

In the Second World War the county adopted during Warship Week the destroyer HMS Wallace raising over £547,000 in donations. Many of the houses built for the expanding population during the 19th and 20th century were of poor quality, necessitating the building of thousands of council houses in the latter part of the 20th century, especially at Livingston, where several smaller settlements were historically mining villages. Under the New Towns Act of 1946, Livingston was designated as a New Town on 16 April 1962.

Heavy industry in the county declined after the Second World War, and the last shale oil mine closed in 1962. In 1975, as a result of the Local Government (Scotland) Act 1973, the boundaries of West Lothian were adjusted, so that some western areas of Midlothian were added, while some West Lothian settlements became part of Falkirk District and Edinburgh. The 1973 Act abolished the traditional counties, burghs and districts, instead creating a system of Regions and Districts. West Lothian was made a district of Lothian Region but lost the burgh of Bo'ness and the district of Bo'ness to Falkirk District of Central Region, and the burgh of Queensferry and the district of Kirkliston plus part of Winchburgh to Edinburgh district of Lothian Region. It gained East Calder and West Calder districts from Midlothian. The two-tier system was abolished by the Local Government etc. (Scotland) Act 1994, and the district of West Lothian was made into a unitary council area named West Lothian Council.

Notable residents of West Lothian include monarchs and political figures including Mary Queen of Scots (born at Linlithgow Palace), King James the Fifth (born at Linlithgow Palace), Robin Cook (the Member of Parliament for Livingston from 1983 to 2005), Alex Salmond (from Linlithgow, the former first minister of Scotland), and Sir Tom Dalyell (the Member of Parliament for Linlithgow from 1962 to 2005). Figures from industry and academia include John Fleming (from Bathgate, a naturalist, zoologist and geologist), Sir Charles Wyville Thomson (from Linlithgow, a natural historian and marine zoologist), and James Young Simpson (an obstetrician and significant figure in the history of medicine).

== Geography ==
The traditional county bordered the historic counties of Midlothian to the south-east, Lanarkshire to the south-west and Stirlingshire to the west. Its border with Midlothian was formed by the Breich Water, from its source until it reached the Almond, and it then followed the Almond to the Firth of Forth (except by Livingston, where Midlothian intruded about a mile past the Almond to include the hamlets of Howden, Craigshill, and Pumpherston). The western border was formed first by the Drumtassie Burn and then by the Avon. It had an area of 120 sq. miles (310 km^{2}), making it the third-smallest of Scotland's 33 counties and smaller than the modern council area.

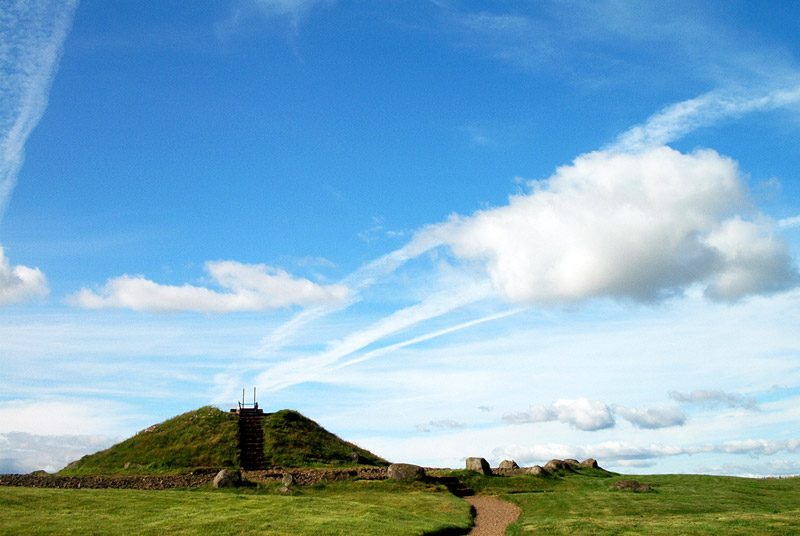
Cairnpapple Hill, historically the highest point in West Lothian before the county boundaries were changed.

The geology of West Lothian is typical for the Midland valley area geological of Scotland. Most of the bedrock surface area is underlaid by Carboniferous sedimentary rocks running in strips from north to south, with a variety of glacial deposits. The exception is the Bathgate Hills, which are composed of volcanic rocks to the north of Bathgate and around Linlithgow. Other rock types include oil shale, sandstone, dolerite. The eastern and southern rocks are the oldest, specifically Devonian sandstones and volcanic rocks in the Pentland Hills. In the middle of the county there is a large field of shale oil running south to north (underneath the settlements of Broxburn, Livingston and West Calder), then sedimentary and basalt rocks, which supply silica sand. In the far west of the county, a large carboniferous coalfield exists; it extends underneath Whitburn, Blackridge and Harthill. The oil shale in West Lothian is an organic-rich, fine-grained sedimentary rock containing kerogen (a solid mixture of organic chemical compounds) from which liquid hydrocarbons can be extracted. This extraction was carried out extensively in the region in the late 19th and early 20th centuries, by a process developed by the chemist James Young.

The area rises from lowlands in the north to the Pentland Hills in the southeast, while the southwest is moorland. West Cairn Hill is the highest peak and Current County Top (CoU) at 562 m (1,844 ft). The previous County Top was Cairnpapple Hill which is now the Historical County Top (CoH). Two thirds of the land is agricultural, while a tenth is urban. Significant watercourses include the Almond and the Union Canal, while the main bodies of water are Linlithgow Loch, Dundas Loch, Humbie Reservoir, Lochcote Reservoir, Beecraigs Loch and Bangour Reservoir. The small island of Inchgarvie near the Forth Bridge lies within the historic borders of the county.

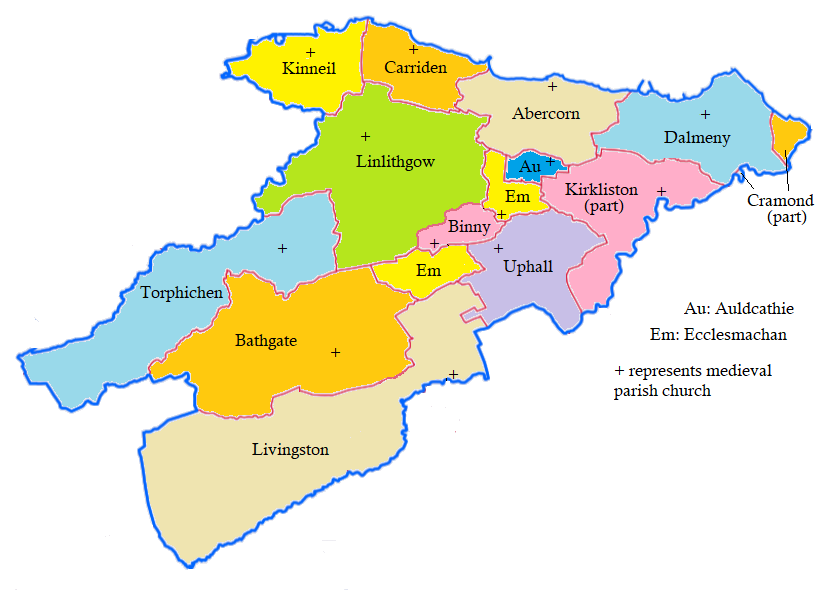
Medieval parishes and churches of Linlithgowshire

=== Settlements ===
==== In both historic and modern West Lothian ====
- Abercorn
- Armadale
- Auldcathie
- Bathgate
- Blackburn
- Blackridge
- Bridgend
- Broxburn
- Deans
- Dechmont
- East Whitburn
- Ecclesmachan
- Eliburn
- Fauldhouse
- Greenrigg
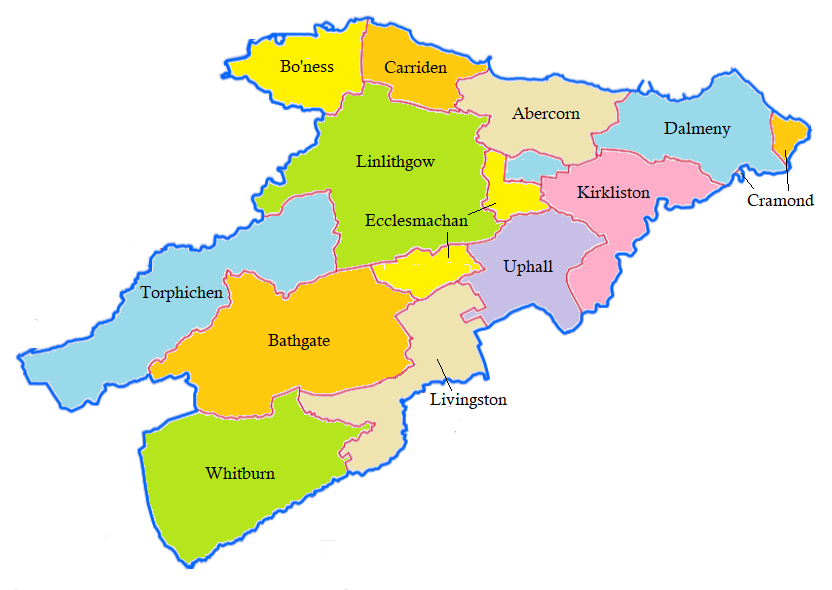
- Parishes of Linlithgowshire in the 1880s
  Knightsridge
- Ladywell
- Linlithgow
- Livingston (part)
- Livingston Village
- Longridge
- Philpstoun
- Seafield
- Stoneyburn
- Threemiletown
- Torphichen
- Uphall
- Uphall Station
- Westrigg
- Winchburgh
- Whitburn

==== Historically in West Lothian, since transferred elsewhere ====
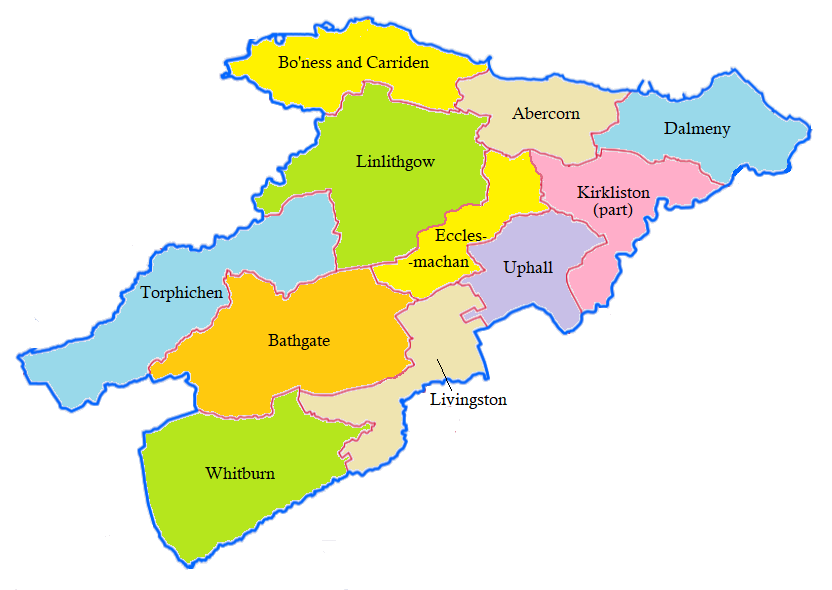
Parishes of Linlithgowshire in the 1950s

- Blackness (now in Falkirk)
- Bo'ness (now in Falkirk)
- Dalmeny (now in Edinburgh)
- Kirkliston (now in Edinburgh)
- Muirhouses (now in Falkirk)
- South Queensferry (now in Edinburgh)

==== In modern West Lothian, not historically part of the county ====
All of the following areas were historically in Midlothian:

- Adambrae
- Addiewell
- Bellsquarry
- Breich
- Cobbinshaw
- Craigshill
- Dedridge
- East Calder
- Harburn
- Howden
- Kirknewton
- Levenseat
- Livingston (part)
- Mid Calder
- Murieston
- Polbeth
- Pumpherston
- West Calder
- Wilkieston
