= List of places in West Lothian =

Map of places in West Lothian compiled from this list
See the list of places in Scotland for places in other counties.

This List of places in West Lothian is a list of links for any town, village, hamlet, castle, golf course, historic house, hillfort, lighthouse, nature reserve, reservoir, river, and other place of interest in the West Lothian council area of Scotland.

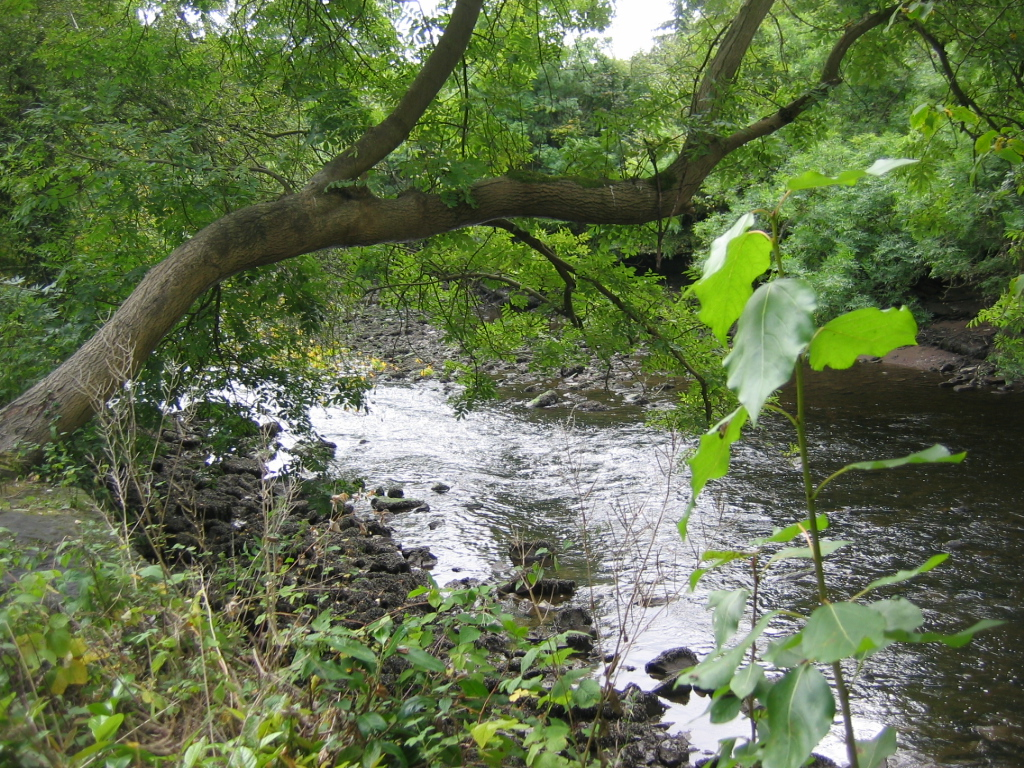
River Almond

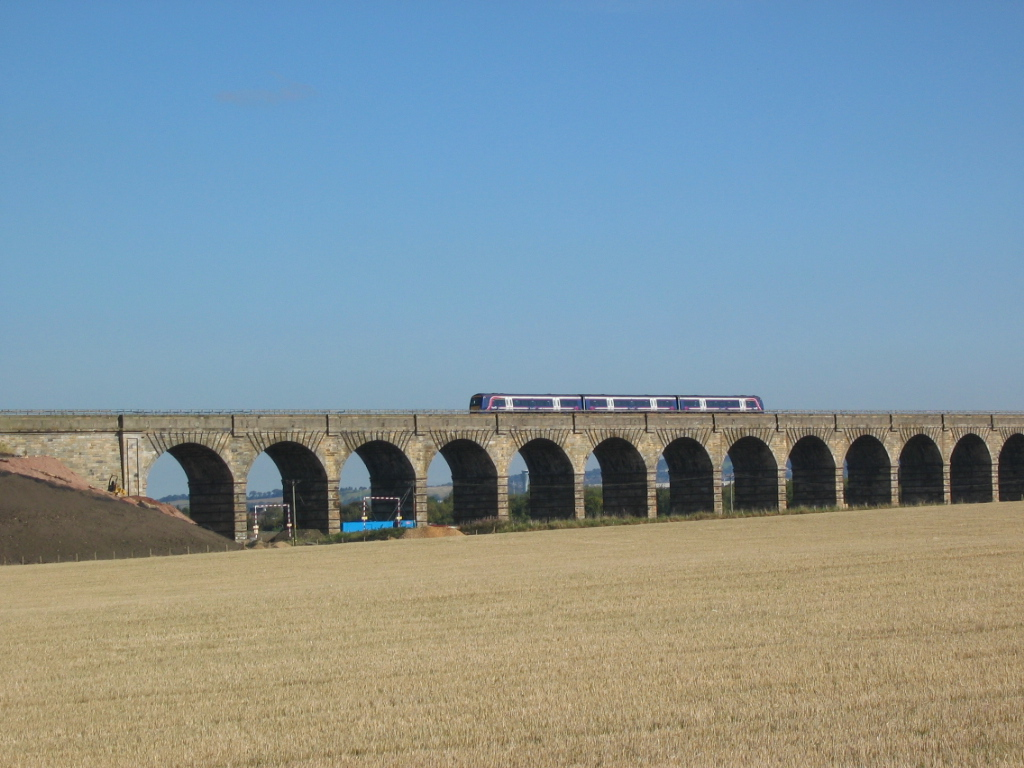
Almond Valley Railway Viaduct

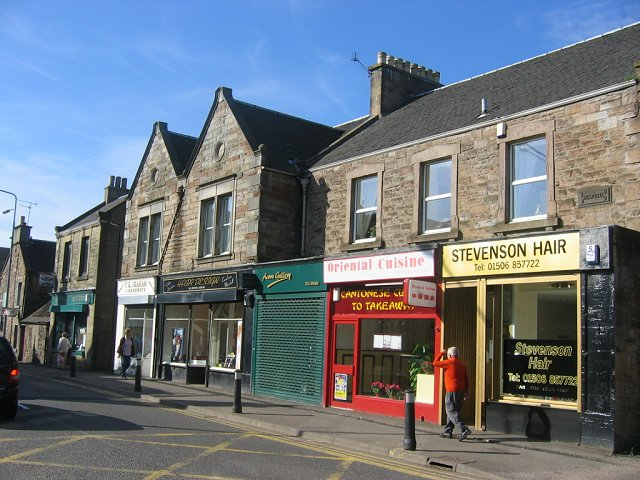
Broxburn, Greendykes Road

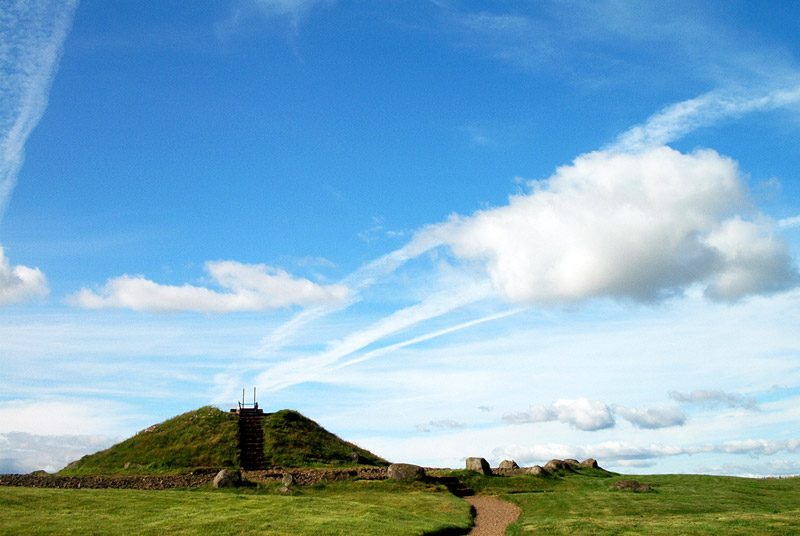
Cairnpapple Hill

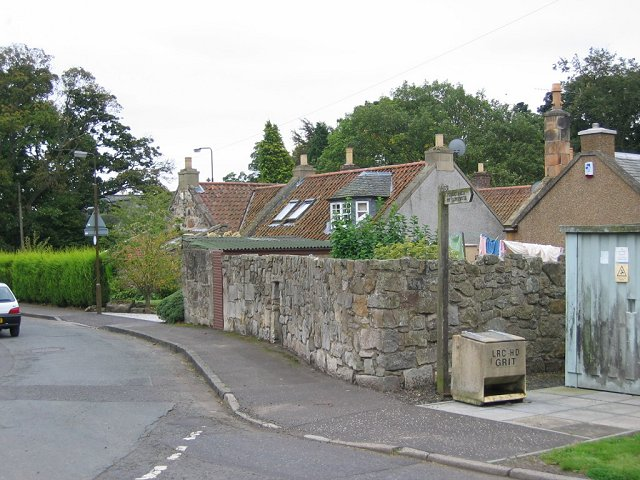
Ecclesmachan

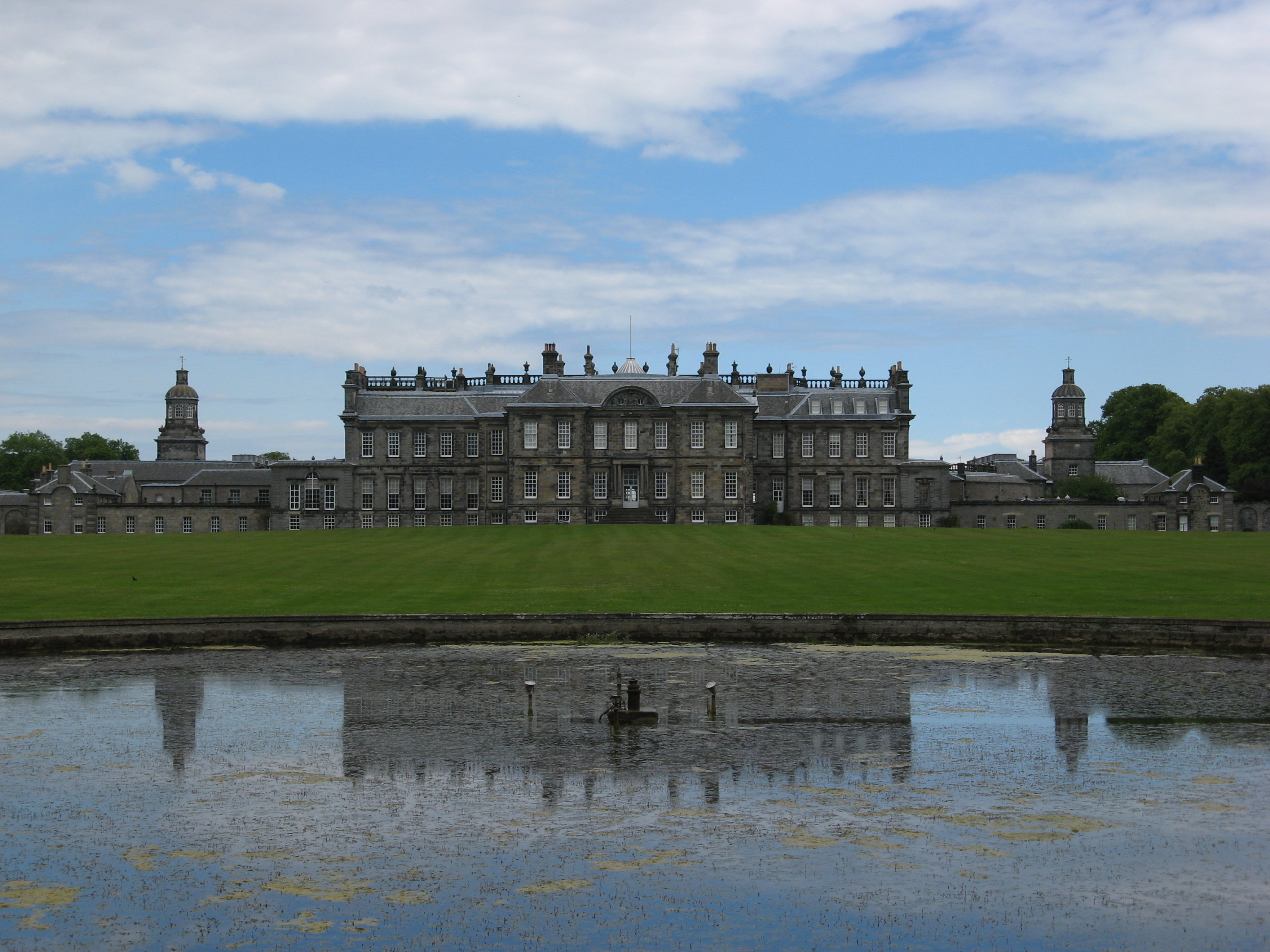
Hopetoun House

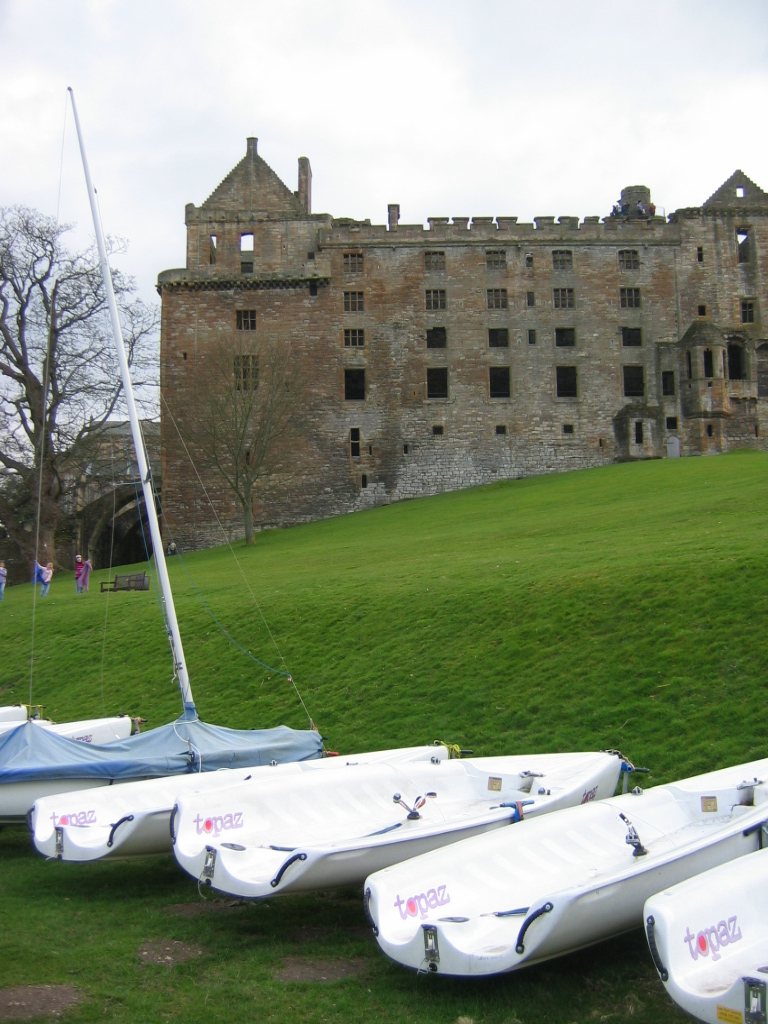
Linlithgow Loch

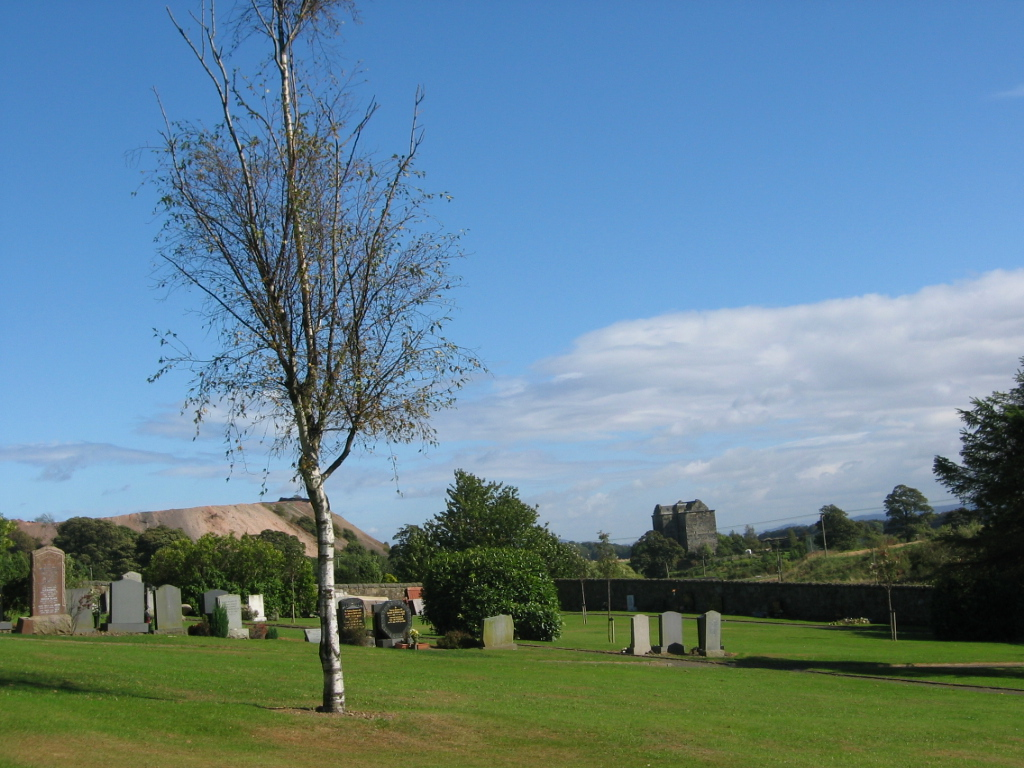
Winchburgh Cemetery

== A ==
- Abercorn
- Abercorn Castle
- Almondell and Calderwood Country Park
- Almond Valley Heritage Centre
- Almond Valley Viaduct
- Almond Aqueduct
- Almondvale Stadium
- Almondell Viaduct
- Armadale
- Auldcathie
- Avon Viaduct

== B ==
- Balbardie Park of Peace Golf Course
- Ballencrieff
- Bangour Village Hospital
- Bathgate
- Bathgate Castle
- Bathville
- Beecraigs Country Park, Beecraigs Prehistoric Site, Beecraigs Sawmill
- Bellsquarry
- Bennie Museum, Bathgate
- Binny Golf Club, Broxburn
- Blackburn
- Blackridge
- Blawhorn Moss
- Bowden Prehistoric Hillfort
- Bridgend
- Broxburn
- Breich
- Boghall

== C ==
- Cairnpapple Hill
- Cairns Castle
- Castle Greg
- Castlethorn Prehistoric Hillfort
- Cobbinshaw
- Cobbinshaw Reservoir
- Cockleroy Prehistoric Hillfort
- Craigshill

== D ==
- Dechmont Law
- Drumshoreland

== E ==
- East Calder
- East Kirkton Quarry
- East Whitburn
- Ecclesmachan
- Eliburn, Eliburn Reservoir

== F ==
- Fauldhouse
- Five Sisters Zoo

== G ==
- Greenrigg

== H ==
- Harburn
- Harperrig Reservoir
- Hopetoun House
- House of the Binns
- Howden, Livingston

== I ==
- Illieston House

== K ==
- Kirk of Calder
- Kirknewton
- Kirkton, Livingston

== L ==
- Loganlea
- Linlithgow, Linlithgow Marches, Linlithgow Palace, Linlithgow railway station
- Livingston, Livingston railway station
- Livingston Village
- Longridge

== M ==
- Mid Calder
- Midhope Castle
- Morton
- Murieston
- Murieston Castle

== N ==
- Newton
- Niddry Castle

== O ==
- Ochiltree Castle
- Ogilface Castle

== P ==
- Peace Knowe Hillfort
- Philpstoun
- Polkemmet Country Park
- Polkemmet Golf Club
- Pumpherston

== R ==
- River Almond
- River Avon
- River Forth

== S ==
- Seafield
- St Michael's Parish Church, Linlithgow
- Stoneyburn
- Strathbrock Church

== T ==
- Threemiletown
- Torphichen, Torphichen Preceptory
- The Centre

== U ==
- Uphall

== W ==
- West Calder
- Whitburn
- Wilkieston
- Winchburgh

== See also ==
- List of places in Scotland
