= A899 road =

Road in Scotland

A899

Route information
- Length: 7 mi (11 km)

Major junctions
- North end: Broxburn; 55.9344°N 3.4510°W
- M8; A71; A89 A705
- South end: Lizzie Brice Round, A71, Livingston; 55.8809°N 3.4921°W

Location
- Country: United Kingdom
- Constituent country: Scotland

Road network
- Roads in the United Kingdom; Motorways; A and B road zones

The A899 is a road in West Lothian, Scotland, connecting Broxburn to Livingston.

It runs from a junction with the A89 at the East Mains Industrial Estate, through Broxburn town centre and along to Uphall, where it turns south to the Dechmont Roundabout (meeting the A89 again) then the Deer Park Roundabout serving Junction 3 of the M8 motorway.

From that point it becomes a dual carriageway running through the town of Livingston, passing through the districts of Knightsridge, Houston Industrial Estate, Ladywell (where there is a cloverleaf interchange with the A705), Howden and Craigshill, before a junction for Livingston Town Centre, after which it runs past Dedridge to its terminus at the Lizzie Brice Roundabout, meeting the A71.
