= Inveralmond Community High School =

Coordinates: 55.900°N 3.521°W

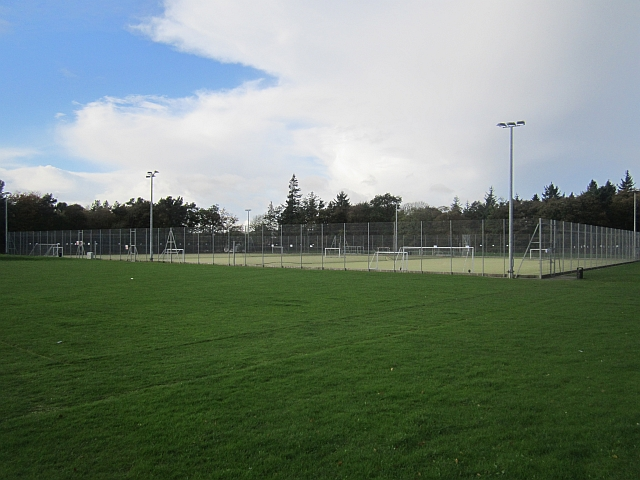
- The school's sports facilities in 2013

Location
- Willowbank, Ladywell; Livingston, West Lothian, EH54 6HW; Scotland

Information
- Type: Secondary school
- Established: 1979
- Local authority: West Lothian Council
- Headteacher: Hamish Shankland
- Depute Headteacher(s): Irene McGinnis, Keith Varty
- Age: 11 to 18
- Houses: Arran, Skye, Tiree
- Colours: Blue, Black
- Website: http://www.inveralmondchs.westlothian.org.uk/

Inveralmond Community High School is a six-year, mixed comprehensive school in Ladywell, Livingston. It serves six primary schools in its catchment area: Harrysmuir Primary, Livingston Village Primary, Toronto Primary, Riverside Primary, Peel Primary and Letham Primary.

The school roll is approximately 1050 pupils.

== History ==
The school opened in 1979.

Gordon Ford assumed the role of headteacher at the school in 2001, after having previously served as headteacher of Broughton High School in Edinburgh. In February 2003, The Sunday Times reported that the government had ranked the school among Scotland's poorest performing secondary schools based on the percentage of pupils passing three Highers. Under Ford's leadership, the school underwent significant changes, including the introduction of a prefect system, a mandatory uniform policy, and a citizenship program for S5-S6 students to participate in community service. In August 2004, TES reported that the school had gone from being one of the 30 lowest ranked secondary schools in Scotland to being in the top 150 based on the predicted grades of those in fourth year.

In April 2012, it was reported that the school was under investigation after a music teacher, who had taught at the school for six years, was found not to have been fully qualified to teach at secondary schools. In April 2013, the school became the first in Scotland to adopt eco-friendly uniforms, with the school jackets being produced from recycled plastic bottles.

In August 2018, The Jewish Chronicle reported that a PE teacher at the school had been removed from the teaching register after allegedly calling a pupil a "poofy Jew" and slapping them. Another teacher at the school had their contract terminated after the General Teaching Council for Scotland found that they had interfered with the investigation by asking students for statements defending the accused teacher.

== Notable former head teachers ==
- Gordon Ford OBE (born 1952 or 1953), former deputy chief executive of West Lothian Council and Livingston F.C. shareholder
