= Cedarbank School =

SEN secondary school in Scotland

Coordinates: 55.89656°N 3.51770°W

Cedarbank School is a secondary school based in Dedrige, Livingston, Scotland for people with special needs, and it has up to 100 pupils at a time. It has four classes for people with autism, and the classes are named after either Scottish rivers, or Scottish towns, such as Dundee. It also has more classes for people with problems other than autism. The classes teach disabled people how to function in day-to-day life, and also try to teach important lessons about self-esteem and health. They also help students with special needs develop life long employability skills.
