= Ian Colquhoun (author) =

British actor and writer

Ian Colquhoun (/kəˈhuːn/ kə-HOON) is a neurodivergent author, actor, stuntman and historian originally from Craigshill in Livingston in Scotland. He lost his legs and was almost killed in an unprovoked assault and arson attack whilst living in the Republic of Ireland in 2002 and now wears prosthetic legs. He gives lectures to physiotherapy students at an Edinburgh University about his conditions.

Colquhoun appeared on Tiger Aspect Productions Men in White shown in the UK in October 2006 on Channel 4, as well as playing a badly wounded sailor in the film Ocean of Fear, which is about the sinking of USS Indianapolis in 1945.

Colquhoun appeared on Channel 4's Richard & Judy in August 2007 promoting his book and talking about his life. In October 2007 he played 'MacHendry' in episode 92 of the long running SMG drama 'Taggart'. 2007 Also saw Colquhoun appear in a highly successful promotional film that helped Scotland be awarded the 2014 Commonwealth games.

== Bibliography ==
His twelve book releases to date are:

- Burnt – Surviving Against All the Odds – Beaten, Burnt and Left for Dead. One Man's Inspiring Story of His Survival After Losing His Legs
- Drummossie Moor- Jack Cameron, the Irish Brigade and the battle of Culloden
- Nine Lives – A Self-Help Book for Amputees
- GarryOwen! – Jack Cameron, The Seventh Cavalry and The Battle of the Little Bighorn
- Over the hills and far away : The ordinary soldier
- Jihad – Battle for The Sudan
- The Real Livingston – A Kaleidoscope
- Le Boudin – The Demons of Camerone
- Edinburgh – On This Day
- Hibernian FC – On This Day (with Bobby Sinnet)
- From Oblivion to Hampden – Hibs Heroes of 1991
- The Hibs are here – Miller to Millennium
