= Craigshill =

Coordinates: 55.8979°N 3.4979°W

Craigshill: Scottish Gaelic: Cnoc na Creige; Scots: Craigshull
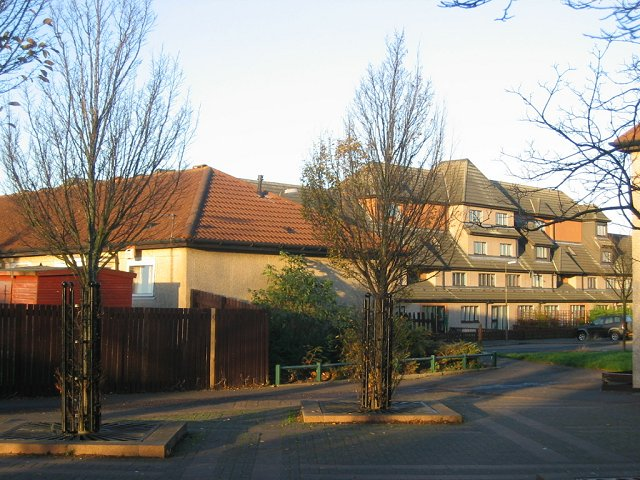

- Location within West Lothian
- Council area: West Lothian
- Lieutenancy area: West Lothian
- Country: Scotland
- Sovereign state: United Kingdom
- Post town: LIVINGSTON
- Dialling code: 01506
- Police: Scotland
- Fire: Scottish
- Ambulance: Scottish
- UK Parliament: Livingston
- Scottish Parliament: Almond Valley; Lothian

Craigshill ("kraygz-hill") is a residential area in the east of Livingston, Scotland. To the west is the A899, with Howden, Ladywell and Knightsridge beyond it, to the south is the village of Mid Calder, and to the north is Houston Industrial Estate and the village of Pumpherston.

== History ==
Craigshill was the first part of Livingston to be constructed after it was designated to be a New Town, starting in 1966. Prior to this, the oldest surviving building in the area is Craigsfarm, located just next to Riverside Primary School and nowadays used as a community centre.

== Areas ==
The area is divided into six sections with the addresses named on themes: the "Grove"s are all named after trees, the "Street"s after Australian cities and towns, the "Drive"s are named after rivers, the "Walk"s are named after lochs, the "Park"s after local hills and the "Court"s after writers.

== Schools ==
Craigshill has three primary schools - Letham, Riverside and Beatlie (formerly Almondbank Primary). Almondbank Library is next to Craigshill Shopping Mall and The Co-operative Food (Formerly Somerfield, Kwik Save).

== Sites ==
To the north of the area, the Livingston Squadron of the Air Training Corps (2535) meet in Maple Grove. Craigshill also has two public houses - The Stirrup Stane and The Tower - and a Masonic Hall home of Lodge Almondvale 1658 on the roll of the Grand Lodge of Scotland.

Livingston Rugby Club are based in the district, with their ground next to the River Almond, along with the Xcite Craigswood sports centre, Livingston Boxing Club and Letham Bowling Club.

== Transport ==
The nearest station to Craigshill is Uphall which is on the North Clyde Line.

== Religion ==
Craigshill is also the home to three churches. St. Columba's Church was demolished in June 2010.

Craigshill is home to West Lothian's first mosque.

== Notable people ==
- Ian Colquhoun (author) grew up in and was educated in Craigshill
- David Martindale, football manager (Livingston F.C.) grew up in the district

== Primary sources ==
- Wills, E (1996) Livingston: the Making of a Scottish New Town
- Cowling, D (1997) An Essay for Today: the Scottish New Towns 1947-1997
