= Ladywell, Livingston =

Area in Livingston, West Lothian, Scotland

Coordinates: 55.898°N 3.527°W

Ladywell: Scottish Gaelic: Tobar na Caillich; Scots: Leddywall
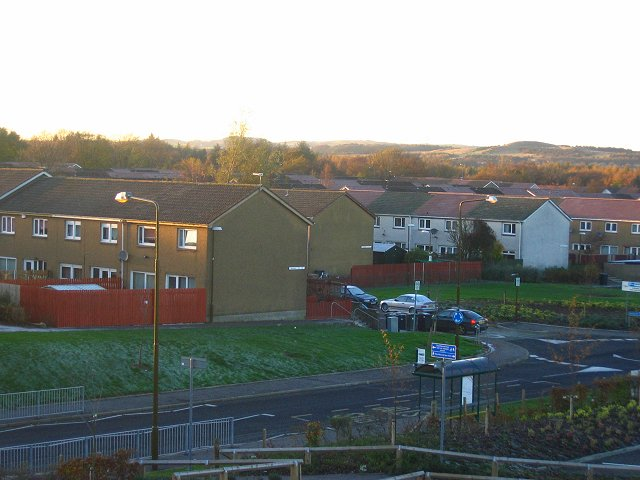
- 1960s and 1970s New Town housing in Ladywell
- Council area: West Lothian
- Lieutenancy area: West Lothian
- Country: Scotland
- Sovereign state: United Kingdom
- Post town: LIVINGSTON
- Postcode district: EH
- Dialling code: 01506
- Police: Scotland
- Fire: Scottish
- Ambulance: Scottish
- UK Parliament: Livingston
- Scottish Parliament: Almond Valley

Ladywell (Scots: Leddywall) is an area, primarily residential in Livingston, West Lothian, Scotland. It is bordered to the north by Knightsridge, to the south by Howden, to the west by Eliburn and to the east by the A899 road.

== History ==
Ladywell was one of the earlier areas of new town housing in Livingston, primarily built over the 1960s and 1970s. Ladywell is split into two areas; Ladywell East with street names with the suffix "Bank" which are all named after features of nature, and Ladywell West with street names suffixed "Brae" which are names after birds of prey and water fowl. Ladywell takes its name from a historic well that was dedicated to Mary and was said to have been used by medieval Scottish Kings as a site for a yearly Royal touching ceremony.

Community buildings include Ladywell Baptist Church, a Post Office branch and local Pharmacy. The Livingston telephone exchange is located in Ladywell and serves over 11,000 properties.

== Schools ==
Inveralmond Community High School is an 11–18 years mixed comprehensive school in Ladywell serving the wider geographical area.

Cedarbank School is a secondary school based in Ladywell for persons with special needs.

Harrysmuir Primary School in Ladywell opened in 1973 and was named for a nearby farm.

== Notable people ==
Local writer Aidan Martin has featured the area in his books, including Euphotic Recall and the Lost Boys of Ladywell.
