= Knightsridge =

Area of Livingston, West Lothian, Scotland

Coordinates: 55°54′27″N 3°31′29″W

Knightsridge: Scottish Gaelic: Druim nan Ridirean; Scots: Knichtsrig
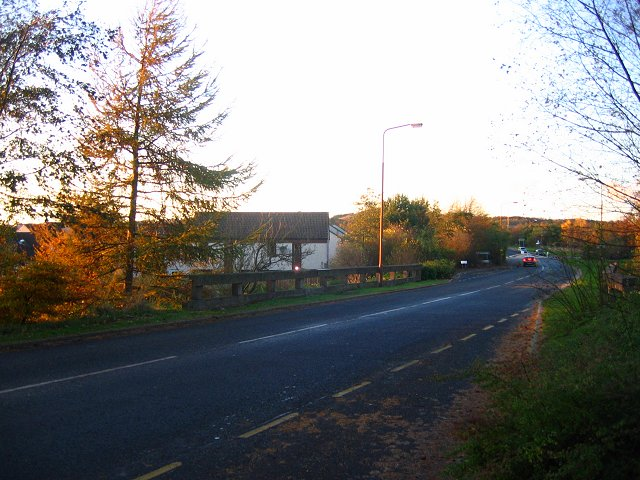
- Knightsridge East Road
- Council area: West Lothian
- Lieutenancy area: West Lothian
- Country: Scotland
- Sovereign state: United Kingdom
- Post town: LIVINGSTON
- Dialling code: 01506
- Police: Scotland
- Fire: Scottish
- Ambulance: Scottish
- UK Parliament: Livingston
- Scottish Parliament: Almond Valley; Lothian

Knightsridge is an area of the town of Livingston in West Lothian, Scotland. Knightsridge lies to the north of the town.

== History ==
Not long after the start of the construction of Craigshill and Howden began, the construction of Knightsridge started in 1968 and finished in 1980. Most of the first residents were placed in Knightsridge, Craigshill, Howden and Ladywell. The streets are named after surnames with the suffix Way i.e. Davidson Way, Barclay Way, Gordon Way, Robertson Way.

The area takes its name from Knightsridge House, a 19th-century farmstead just to the north, whose name itself is derived from Knights Hospitallers of St John who founded the nearby Torphichen Preceptory near Bathgate.

== Culture and Community ==
The Mosswood Community Centre provides facilities such as dance classes, brownies/cubs/beavers, local community groups, such as the Ladies of Livingston and adult education classes. There is a community garden beside the Community Centre.

The Vennie is a local youth club that runs community projects focusing on young people (between the ages of 5 and 21 years) in the area.

Knightsridge is home to the 12th West Lothian Scout Group.

Knightsridge Woods are a 13.07 hectares (32.30 acres) ancient woodland site, consisting primarily of conifers managed by the Woodland Trust.

== Schools ==
Central to the community is Knightsridge Primary School and Early Years Centre. The Knightsridge Parents and Staff Association (KPSA) hold many events throughout the year open to all, not just the families and care givers of the children who attend. The school was constructed in 1973.

Ogilvie School Campus is a school in Knightsridge for children with severe and complex needs in Livingston. These include complex difficulties, sensory impairments, physical disabilities and autism.
