= East Whitburn =

Coordinates: 55.868°N 3.659°W

East Whitburn: Scottish Gaelic: Am Fionn Allt an Ear; Scots: East Whitburn, Easter Whitburn
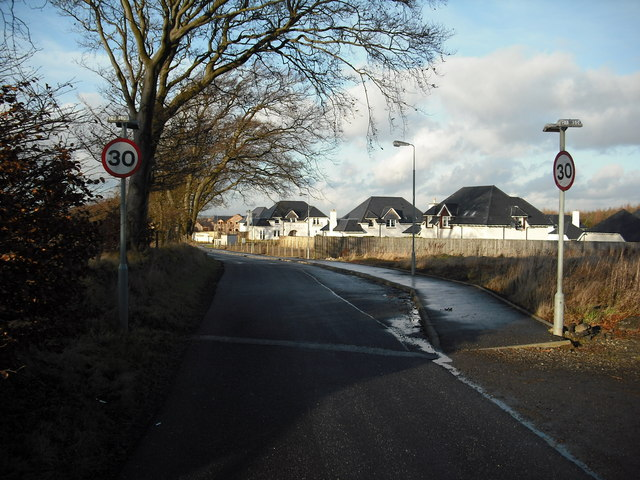
- Recently built houses in 2009

- Location within West Lothian
- Population: 1,240 (2020)
- OS grid reference: NS961651
- Council area: West Lothian
- Lieutenancy area: West Lothian
- Country: Scotland
- Sovereign state: United Kingdom
- Post town: BATHGATE
- Postcode district: EH47
- Dialling code: 01501
- Police: Scotland
- Fire: Scottish
- Ambulance: Scottish
- UK Parliament: Bathgate and Linlithgow
- Scottish Parliament: Linlithgow

East Whitburn is a small village in Scottish county of West Lothian. Bordering the mining town of Whitburn, East Whitburn has grown significantly in the past few years due to developments of large houses. It has one local store and a hairdressers on the main road passing through the village. It also has a karate building which is coached by Stuart Robertson
