= Bridgend, West Lothian =

Coordinates: 55.964°N 3.534°W

Bridgend: Scottish Gaelic: Ceann na Drochaid; Scots: Brigend
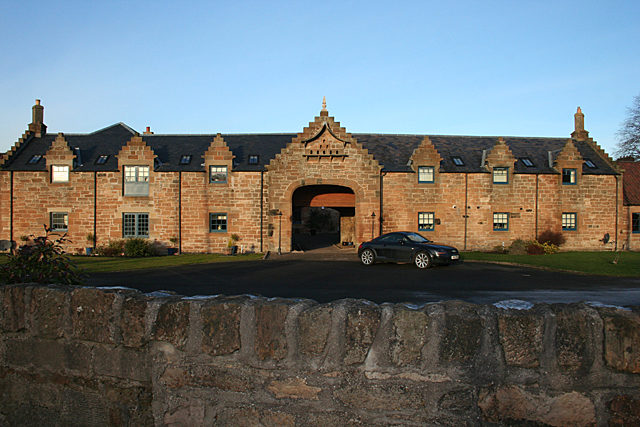
- Bridgend Farm

- Location within West Lothian
- Area: 0.3059 km^{2} (0.1181 sq mi)
- Population: 780 (2020)
  - Density: 2,550/km^{2} (6,600/sq mi)
- OS grid reference: NT042755
- Council area: West Lothian
- Lieutenancy area: West Lothian
- Country: Scotland
- Sovereign state: United Kingdom
- Post town: LINLITHGOW
- Postcode district: EH49
- Dialling code: 01506
- Police: Scotland
- Fire: Scottish
- Ambulance: Scottish
- UK Parliament: Bathgate and Linlithgow
- Scottish Parliament: Linlithgow

Bridgend is a village which neighbours Linlithgow, in West Lothian, Scotland. It has a football team called Bridgend United. In 2018 it had an estimated population of 790.

Bridgend was founded between 1885–86 to serve as housing for the Champfleurie Oil Works in Linlithgow before its closure in 1902.

Currently the town consists mostly of Council housing and is home to local amenities such as a primary school, community centre, and golf course.
