= Eliburn =

Eliburn: Scottish Gaelic: Allt Eilidh; Scots: Eliburn
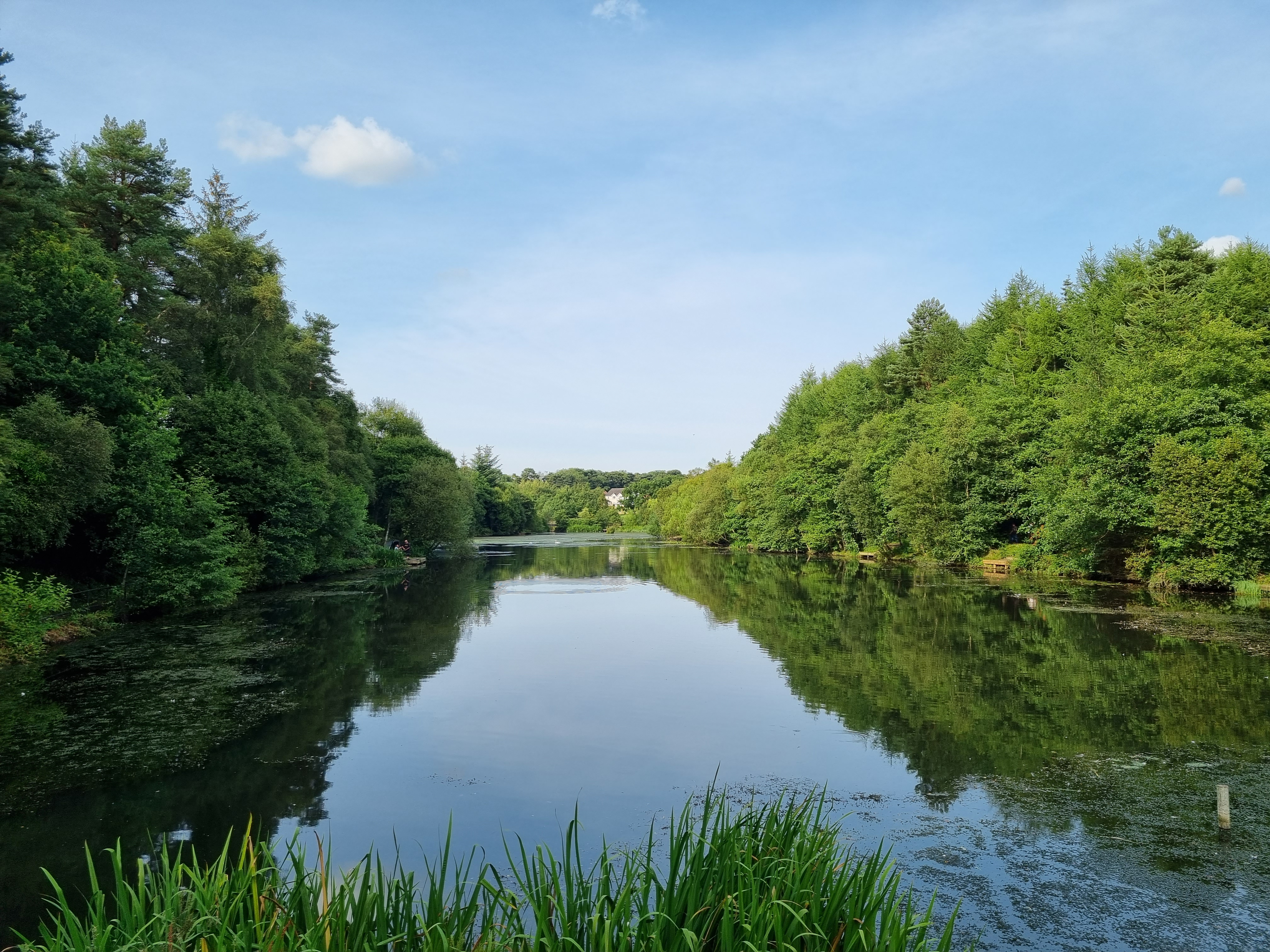
- Eliburn Reservoir as seen from the southern side of Eliburn Park

- Location within West Lothian
- OS grid reference: NT0268
- Council area: West Lothian
- Lieutenancy area: West Lothian
- Country: Scotland
- Sovereign state: United Kingdom
- Post town: LIVINGSTON
- Postcode district: EH54
- Dialling code: 01506
- Police: Scotland
- Fire: Scottish
- Ambulance: Scottish
- UK Parliament: Livingston
- Scottish Parliament: Almond Valley; Lothian

Eliburn is an area, primarily residential, in Livingston, West Lothian, Scotland. Eliburn is bordered by Deans to the north, Ladywell to the east and Livingston Village to the south.

== History ==
The original fortified tower (Livingston Peel) of Livingston was located in Eliburn (the name evolved from the later title of Elibank). The tower house was later occupied by the Murrays of Elibank. In 1670, the Edinburgh botanic garden was founded by Dr. Robert Sibbald and Dr. Andrew Balfour using the plant collection from the Elibank private gardens of Sir Patrick Murray, 2nd Lord Elibank, following his death in September 1671. In the late 17th century, the Peel was demolished and replaced by a house called Livingston Place. The estate eventually passed from the Murray family to the Cunningham family and it was eventually acquired by the Earl of Rosebery in 1828 and demolished in 1840. The area of the former gardens and house is now a local garden and park, named Peel Park. The formal layout and planting in the park reflect the historic gardens, and a new peel mound and moat was recreated to reflect the earlier history.

In the 19th century, a barracks and set of farmhouses (since demolished) existed to the west of Eliburn beside the present day road of Appleton Parkway. A row of cottages (known as Bogyates) also existed beside the Kirk Road forest strip but were demolished in the 20th century. The original forest strip remains with a footpath running its length, separating the houses beside Oldwood Place and Foxknowe place.

== Schools ==
Peel Primary School is a non-denominational primary school located in Eliburn.

== Economy ==
While Eliburn is primarily residential, a small industrial estate, centered around Eliburn Campus and Appleton Parkway lies to the west of the area. This includes a large office of the French IT and service company Atos and the UK head office of Shin-Etsu Chemical, who moved to Livingston in 1988. A small shopping area, which includes a branch of the Coop is located beside Follyburn Place and Eliburn Road.

== Churches ==
Livingston Free Church is an Evangelical and Reformed Presbyterian church on the corner of Eliburn South and Alderstone road that was built in the early 1980s.

== Eliburn Park ==
Eliburn Park is a 16.5-hectare (41-acre) park and sports area, which includes Eliburn reservoir, a play park, woodlands and extensive walking routes. Adjacent woodlands include Eliburn woods, a 7.81 ha (19.30 acres) woodland in strips and Livingston Old Woods.

=== Eliburn Reservoir ===
Eliburn Reservoir
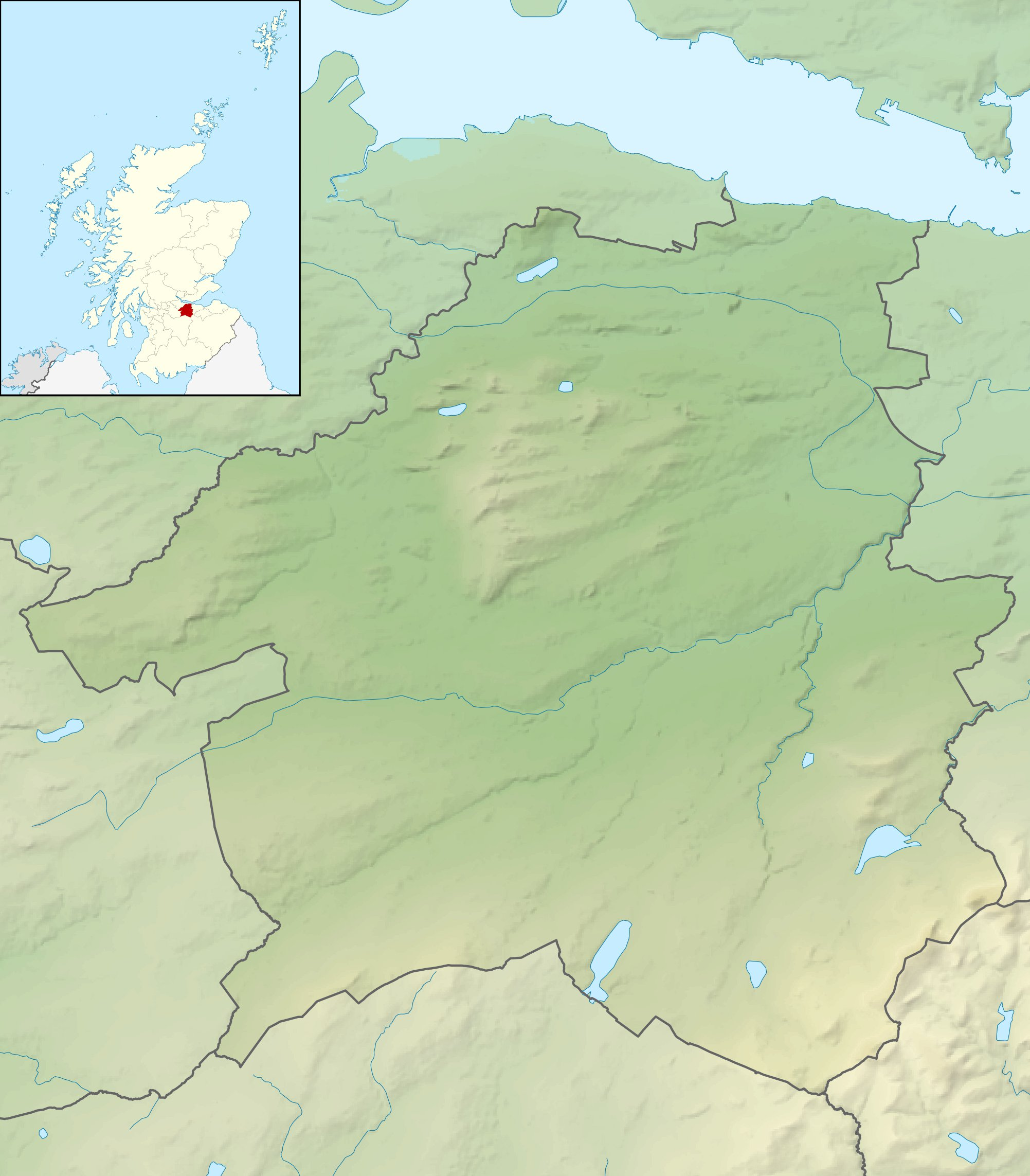
- Location within West Lothian Location within Scotland Location within the United Kingdom
- Location: Eliburn, Livingston, West Lothian, Scotland
- Coordinates: 55°53′39.5″N 03°33′02.5″W
- Primary inflows: Neil Burn
- Primary outflows: Eliburn/Lochshot Burn
- Basin countries: United Kingdom
- Max. depth: 13 feet (4.0 m)

Eliburn Reservoir is a reservoir and coarse fishing venue in Eliburn. Formally known as Deans Reservoir, it is nearly 3 acres in size with water depths up to 13 ft and is open all year round for day ticket anglers. The fishery is managed, stocked and maintained by WLCA (West Lothian Coarse Anglers) who are a not for profit, members fishing club. Species that can be caught include Carp (Mirror, Common, Koi and Crucian), Tench, Bream, Roach, Perch, Ide, Hybrid, Pike, Barbel and Rudd.
