= Loganlea, West Lothian =

Coordinates: 55.8423°N 3.6236°W

Loganlea: Scottish Gaelic: An Lagan
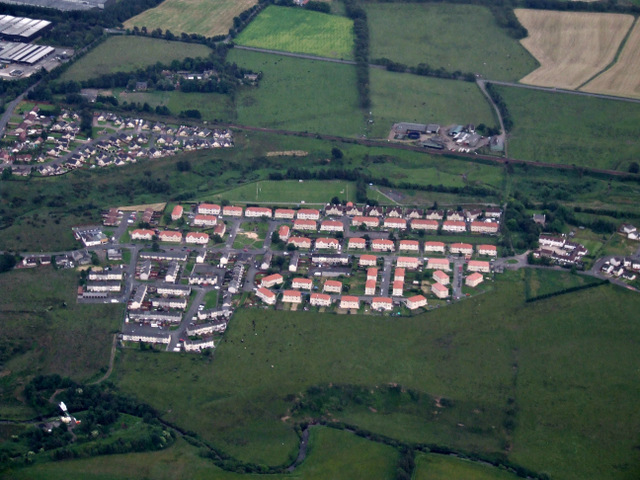
- Loganlea from the air in 2014

- Location within West Lothian
- Council area: West Lothian
- Country: Scotland
- Sovereign state: United Kingdom
- Police: Scotland
- Fire: Scottish
- Ambulance: Scottish

Loganlea is a village in West Lothian, Scotland. The village is immediately west of Addiewell and has a close association with that village as both are former mining communities. The village lies to the south of Breich Water. The Skolie burn lies to the south.

== History ==
Loganlea House is a Georgian era historic house in the village that was built 1798 and is Category B listed. The house had a doocot but it has been vandalised and destroyed.

Loganlea is a former mining community that historically had a strong socialist tradition. The residential settlement grew up around the adjacent Loganlea Colliery, an extensive coalmine owned by United Collieries. The colliery commenced operation circa 1890 and remained in operation until 1959. Its peak year of extraction was 1946 and average of 510 workers were employed. The mine had a mineral railway siding.

In 2004, a Miners Memorial and memorial gardens were opened in the village.

== Governance ==
The village is represented in West Lothian Council by the Fauldhouse and Breich Valley Ward.

== Community ==
There is a social club in the village, the Loganlea Miner's Club.

There is a Loganlea Miners Welfare Charitable Society in the village.

== Transport ==
The nearest railway station is Addiewell railway station.
