= List of listed buildings in West Lothian =

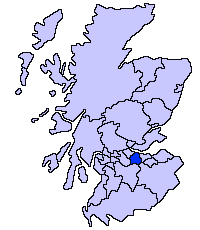
West Lothian shown within Scotland

This is a list of listed buildings in West Lothian. The list is split out by parish.

- List of listed buildings in Abercorn, West Lothian
- List of listed buildings in Bathgate, West Lothian
- List of listed buildings in Ecclesmachan, West Lothian
- List of listed buildings in Kirkliston, West Lothian
- List of listed buildings in Kirknewton, West Lothian
- List of listed buildings in Linlithgow, West Lothian
- List of listed buildings in Livingston, West Lothian
- List of listed buildings in Mid Calder, West Lothian
- List of listed buildings in Torphichen, West Lothian
- List of listed buildings in Uphall, West Lothian
- List of listed buildings in West Calder, West Lothian
- List of listed buildings in Whitburn, West Lothian

== See also ==
- Scheduled monuments in West Lothian
