= List of Category A listed buildings in West Lothian =

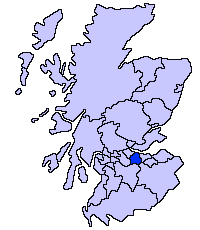
West Lothian shown within Scotland

This is a list of Category A listed buildings in West Lothian, Scotland.

In Scotland, the term listed building refers to a building or other structure officially designated as being of "special architectural or historic interest". Category A structures are those considered to be "buildings of national or international importance, either architectural or historic, or fine little-altered examples of some particular period, style or building type." Listing was begun by a provision in the Town and Country Planning (Scotland) Act 1947, and the current legislative basis for listing is the Planning (Listed Buildings and Conservation Areas) (Scotland) Act 1997. The authority for listing rests with Historic Scotland, an executive agency of the Scottish Government, which inherited this role from the Scottish Development Department in 1991. Once listed, severe restrictions are imposed on the modifications allowed to a building's structure or its fittings. Listed building consent must be obtained from local authorities prior to any alteration to such a structure. There are approximately 47,400 listed buildings in Scotland, of which around 8% (some 3,800) are Category A.

The council area of West Lothian covers 427 square kilometres (165 sq mi), and has a population of around 169,500. There are 42 Category A listed buildings within the area, ranging from Linlithgow Palace, a principal residence of the Kings of Scotland, to more modest farms and cottages such as Gowanbank or Woodcockdale. Historic churches include those at Abercorn, Mid Calder and Linlithgow. Several small castles and tower houses merit Category A listing. More recent country houses include Hopetoun House, worked on successively by Sir William Bruce, William Adam and Robert Adam. A number of 19th century viaducts and aqueducts carry railways and canals across the River Avon and River Almond. In the historic royal burgh of Linlithgow, besides the palace and parish church, several town houses are listed at Category A. Few recent buildings in the area merit Category A listing, with only one building dating from the post-war period (Brucefield Church).

== Listed buildings ==
Name	Location	Date listed	Geo-coordinates	Notes	LB number	Image
Abercorn Church	Abercorn		55°59′44″N 3°28′27″W	12th-century church with later alterations	612	Upload another image See more images
Hopetoun House	4 kilometres (2.5 mi) west of South Queensferry		55°59′45″N 3°27′47″W	Late 17th-century country house	613	Upload another image See more images
Hopetoun House estate buildings and steading	Hopetoun House Estate		55°59′38″N 3°27′37″W	18th-century estate buildings	614	Upload Photo
Midhope Castle	Abercorn		55°59′32″N 3°29′16″W	16th-century tower house	630	Upload another image See more images
House of the Binns	1.5 kilometres (0.93 mi) south of Blackness		55°59′26″N 3°31′23″W	Country house dating to 1612–1630	632	Upload another image See more images
Duntarvie Castle	2km north of Winchburgh		55°58′22″N 3°27′32″W	Scots Renaissance house of circa 1590	6422	Upload another image See more images
Bangour Village Hospital, excluding villas 9, 23–29, 31, and boiler house	1 kilometre (0.62 mi) west of Dechmont		55°55′27″N 3°33′01″W	Former hospital built 1898–1906, and church dating from the 1920s	6588	Upload another image See more images
Hatton House, south entrance gates	2 kilometres (1.2 mi) south of Ratho		55°54′04″N 3°23′46″W	Gateway built 1692 as an entrance to the now-demolished Hatton House	7355	Upload another image See more images
Linhouse Water Viaduct	1.5 kilometres (0.93 mi) east of Murieston		55°52′01″N 3°28′38″W	1842 railway viaduct carrying the Edinburgh to Carstairs railway over the Linhouse Water	7365	Upload another image See more images
Almondell Bridge	1 kilometre (0.62 mi) north of East Calder in Almondell and Calderwood Country Park		55°54′14″N 3°27′36″W	1800 bridge over the River Almond (Note: Almondell Bridge is listed twice)	7370	Upload another image See more images
Almondell Bridge	1 kilometre (0.62 mi) north of East Calder in Almondell and Calderwood Country Park		55°54′14″N 3°27′36″W	1800 bridge over the River Almond (Note: Almondell Bridge is listed twice)	14228	Upload another image See more images
Almondell Aqueduct	Almondell and Calderwood Country Park, East Calder		55°54′04″N 3°27′46″W	1820 aqueduct built to feed the Union Canal	7371	Upload another image See more images
Blackburn House	Between Blackburn and Seafield		55°52′25″N 3°35′56″W	18th-century country house	7419	Upload another image See more images
Broxburn Viaduct	2.5 kilometres (1.6 mi) east of Broxburn		55°56′15″N 3°25′59″W	Railway viaduct carrying the Edinburgh to Glasgow railway over the A89 road	7427	Upload another image See more images
Almond Valley Viaduct	3 kilometres (1.9 mi) east of Broxburn		55°56′04″N 3°25′21″W	1842 railway viaduct carrying the Edinburgh to Glasgow railway over the River Almond (Note: Also in City of Edinburgh, as it crosses the River Almond which is the council boundary)	7428	Upload another image See more images
Almond Aqueduct	3 kilometres (1.9 mi) south-east of Broxburn		55°55′14″N 3°26′04″W	1820 aqueduct carrying the Union Canal over the River Almond	7430	Upload another image See more images
Niddry Castle	Near Winchburgh		55°57′13″N 3°27′00″W	Tower house of circa 1500	7437	Upload another image See more images
Avon Aqueduct	3 kilometres (1.9 mi) south-west of Linlithgow		55°57′52″N 3°39′20″W	1822 aqueduct carrying the Union Canal over the River Almond (Note: Also in Falkirk, as it crosses the River Avon which is the council boundary)	7468	Upload another image See more images
Kingscavil Cottages	3 kilometres (1.9 mi) east of Linlithgow		55°58′16″N 3°33′18″W	1873 cottages and former schoolhouse	7482	Upload another image
Grange House	1.5 kilometres (0.93 mi) north of Linlithgow		55°59′29″N 3°36′15″W	Early 20th-century country house	12972	Upload Photo
Ochiltree Castle	3.5 kilometres (2.2 mi) south-east of Linlithgow		55°57′22″N 3°33′03″W	Early 17th-century tower house	12978	Upload another image See more images
Preston House	Preston Road, Linlithgow		55°57′54″N 3°36′37″W	19th-century baronial house by William Burn and David Bryce	12983	Upload Photo
Avon Viaduct	Linlithgow Bridge		55°58′29″N 3°38′00″W	1842 viaduct carrying the Edinburgh to Glasgow railway over the River Avon	12985	Upload another image See more images
Woodcockdale, cottages and stables	2.5 kilometres (1.6 mi) south-west of Linlithgow		55°57′54″N 3°38′32″W	Early 19th-century stables and cottages	12989	Upload another image See more images
Mid Calder Parish Church (St John's)	Main Street, Mid Calder		55°53′24″N 3°28′57″W	16th-century Gothic church	14144	Upload another image See more images
Calder House	Mid Calder		55°53′22″N 3°29′04″W	16th- or 17th-century mansion, incorporating walls of earlier fortalice	14153	Upload another image See more images
Calder House, east gateway	West Calder Road, Mid Calder		55°53′20″N 3°28′54″W	Ornamental gateway of circa 1670	14155	Upload another image
Linhouse	2 kilometres (1.2 mi) south of Murieston		55°51′02″N 3°29′56″W	1589 country house	14156	Upload Photo
Houstoun House	Uphall		55°55′33″N 3°31′04″W	17th-century house, now a hotel	14243	Upload another image
Gowanbank	3 kilometres (1.9 mi) north-west of Armadale		55°55′20″N 3°44′12″W	19th-century farmhouse, steading and cottage by Sir James Gowans	14557	Upload another image
Bathgate Academy	Marjoribanks Street, Bathgate		55°54′02″N 3°38′01″W	19th-century Greek revival school	22125	Upload another image See more images
Linlithgow Burgh Halls	The Cross, Linlithgow		55°58′39″N 3°36′02″W	17th-century town house, including former jail and court house	37362	Upload another image See more images
Cross House	5 The Cross, Linlithgow		55°58′38″N 3°36′04″W	18th-century house, Category A listed for its interiors	37363	Upload another image See more images
St Michael's Well	High Street, Linlithgow		55°58′36″N 3°35′51″W	Well dated 1720 with a statue of St Michael	37383	Upload another image
West Port House	297–299 High Street, Linlithgow		55°58′33″N 3°36′34″W	Laird's house, circa 1600 with later additions	37430	Upload another image
Hamilton's Land	38–44 High Street, Linlithgow		55°58′37″N 3°35′52″W	Early 17th-century tenement building, restored 1958	37438	Upload another image
Hamilton's Land	46–48 High Street, Linlithgow		55°58′37″N 3°35′52″W	Early 17th-century tenement building, restored 1958	37439	Upload Photo
Dovecot	Learmonth Gardens, Linlithgow		55°58′32″N 3°35′54″W	16th-century beehive dovecote	37468	Upload another image See more images
Linlithgow Palace	Linlithgow Peel		55°58′43″N 3°36′03″W	Former royal palace built over 15th to 17th centuries, now in ruins	37469	Upload another image See more images
Linlithgow Palace Gateway	Linlithgow Peel		55°58′41″N 3°36′03″W	Gateway to former royal palace, circa 1535	37470	Upload another image See more images
St Michael's Church	Linlithgow Peel		55°58′40″N 3°36′00″W	15th-century parish church	37499	Upload another image See more images
Brucefield Church	East Main Street, Whitburn, West Lothian	4 December 2008	55°52′01″N 3°40′54″W	Rowand Anderson, Kininmonth and Paul (William Kininmonth and Tom Duncan)	51254	Upload another image See more images

== See also ==
- Scheduled monuments in West Lothian
