= Moss House =

Moss House or Moss Hall or variations may refer to:

== England ==
- Moss Hall, Audlem, a manor house in Cheshire, England
- White Moss House, a house purchased by William Wordsworth, in Rydal, Cumbria
- Soss Moss Hall, a former manor house in the parish of Nether Alderley, Cheshire, England
- The Moss House, an architectural folly within Staunton Country Park, Hampshire, England
- Moss House Works, a cotton or other textile mill in Salford, Greater Manchester

== Scotland ==
- Moss Houses, listed buildings in Livingston parish, West Lothian, Scotland
- Moss House, a historic house within Kirkwood Estate, East Ayrshire, Scotland

== United States ==
(by state then town or city)

- J. Mora Moss House, in Mosswood Park in Oakland, California
- Moss Hill, Norfolk, CT, a historic home designed by Alfredo S.G. Taylor and listed on the NRHP in Litchfield County, Connecticut
- Henry Clay Moss House, Paris IL, listed on the NRHP in Illinois
- Curd-Moss House, Bowling Green, KY, listed on the NRHP in Warren County, Kentucky
- Moss Side (Versailles, Kentucky), Versailles, Kentucky, listed on the NRHP in Woodford County, Kentucky
- Moss Grove Plantation House, Jonesville, Louisiana, listed on the NRHP in Catahoula Parish, Louisiana
- "Endcliffe," the Frederick W. Moss house, Kennebunkport, Maine, designed by John Calvin Stevens
- William Moss House, a historic house in Iron County, Michigan
- Long Moss Plantation House, Canton, Mississippi, listed on the NRHP in Madison County, Mississippi
- Moss Mansion, also known as Preston B. Moss House, a historic house in Billings, Montana
- Bacon-Merchant-Moss House, a historic home in Lockport, Niagara County, New York
- Horace O. Moss House, a historic home in New Berlin, Chenango County, New York
- Moss-Johnson Farm, Hendersonville, NC, listed on the NRHP in Henderson County, North Carolina
- Follett-Moss-Moss Residences, Sandusky, Ohio, listed on the NRHP in Sandusky, Ohio
- Moss-Foster House, Sandusky, OH, listed on the NRHP in Sandusky, Ohio
- Cartwright-Moss House, Goodlettsville, TN, listed on the NRHP in Davidson County, Tennessee
- Newsom-Moss House, Lufkin, Texas, listed on the NRHP in Angelina County, Texas
- Moss Neck Manor, Rappahannock Academy, Virginia, listed on the NRHP in Caroline County, Virginia
- Moss's House, an important building in Oregon Hill, a neighborhood of Richmond, Virginia

== See also ==
- The Moss-House: In Which Many of the Works of Nature Are Rendered a Source of Amusement to Children, an 1822 children's book by Agnes Strickland
- Moss Jernverk, in Norway
- Moss Flats Building, San Francisco, California, listed on the NRHP in San Francisco
- A.B. Moss Building, Payette, Idaho, listed on the NRHP in Payette County, Idaho
- Moss Ledge, Saranac Inn, New York, an Adirondack Great Camp designed by William L. Coulter
- Moss Side (disambiguation)
