= River Almond, Lothian =

River in West Lothian, Scotland

Coordinates: 55°58′44″N 3°18′07″W

River Almond
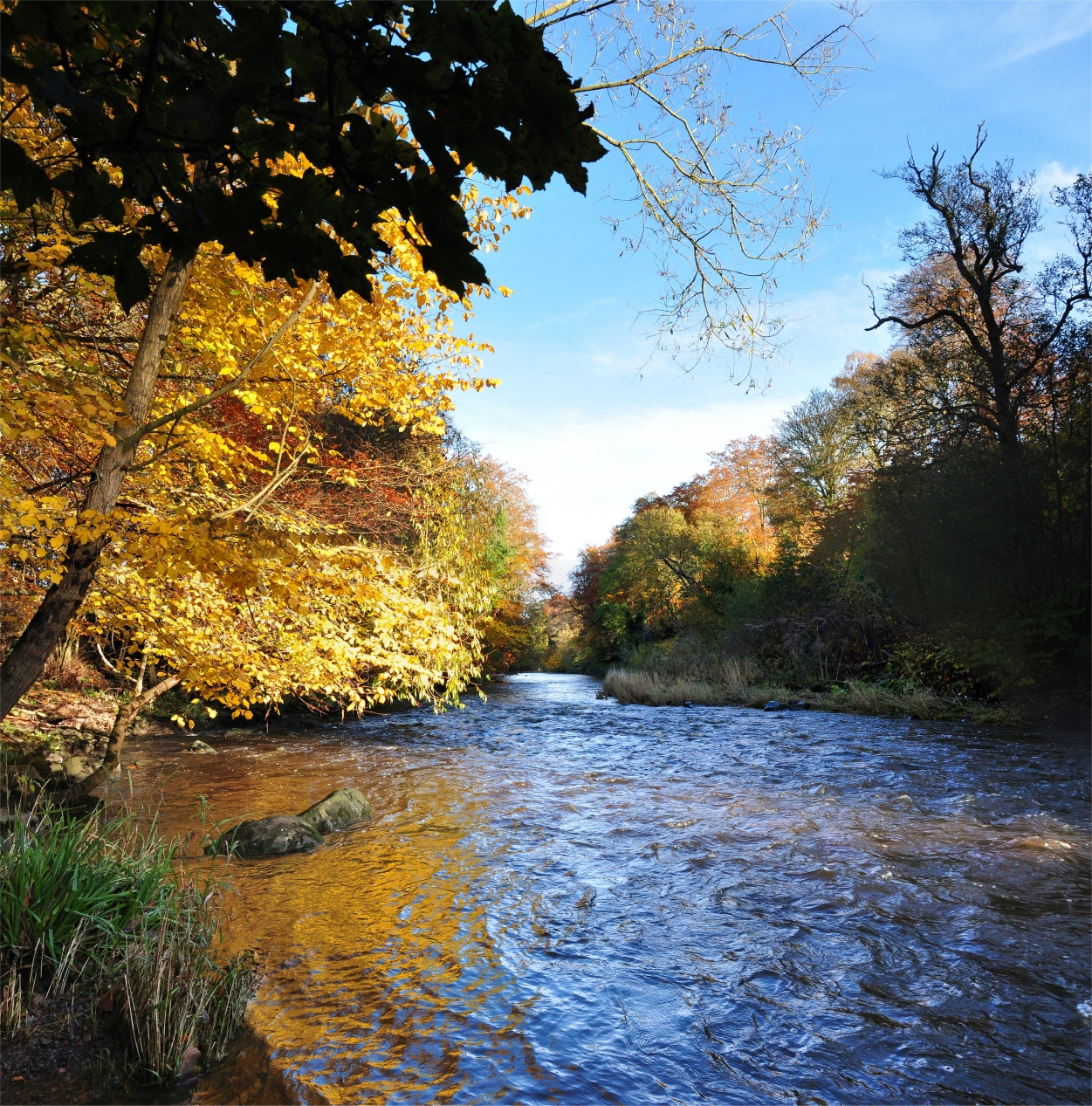
- The Almond upstream of Cramond Brig
- Native name: Abhainn Amain (Scottish Gaelic)

Location
- Country: Scotland
- Councils: North Lanarkshire, West Lothian, Edinburgh

Physical characteristics
- Source: Cant Hills
  - location: North of Shotts
- Mouth: Firth of Forth
  - location: Cramond
- Length: 28 miles (45 km)

Basin features
- Progression: Firth of Forth → North Sea
- Tributaries
  - left: How Burn, Dean Burn, Lochshot Burn, Folly Burn, Bank Burn, Brox Burn, Niddry Burn, Swine Burn
  - right: White Burn, Latch Burn, Foulshiels Burn, Breich Water, Killandean Burn, Dedridge Burn, Murieston Water, Gogar Burn, Bughtlin Burn
- Waterbodies: Almond Pool West, Almond Pool East

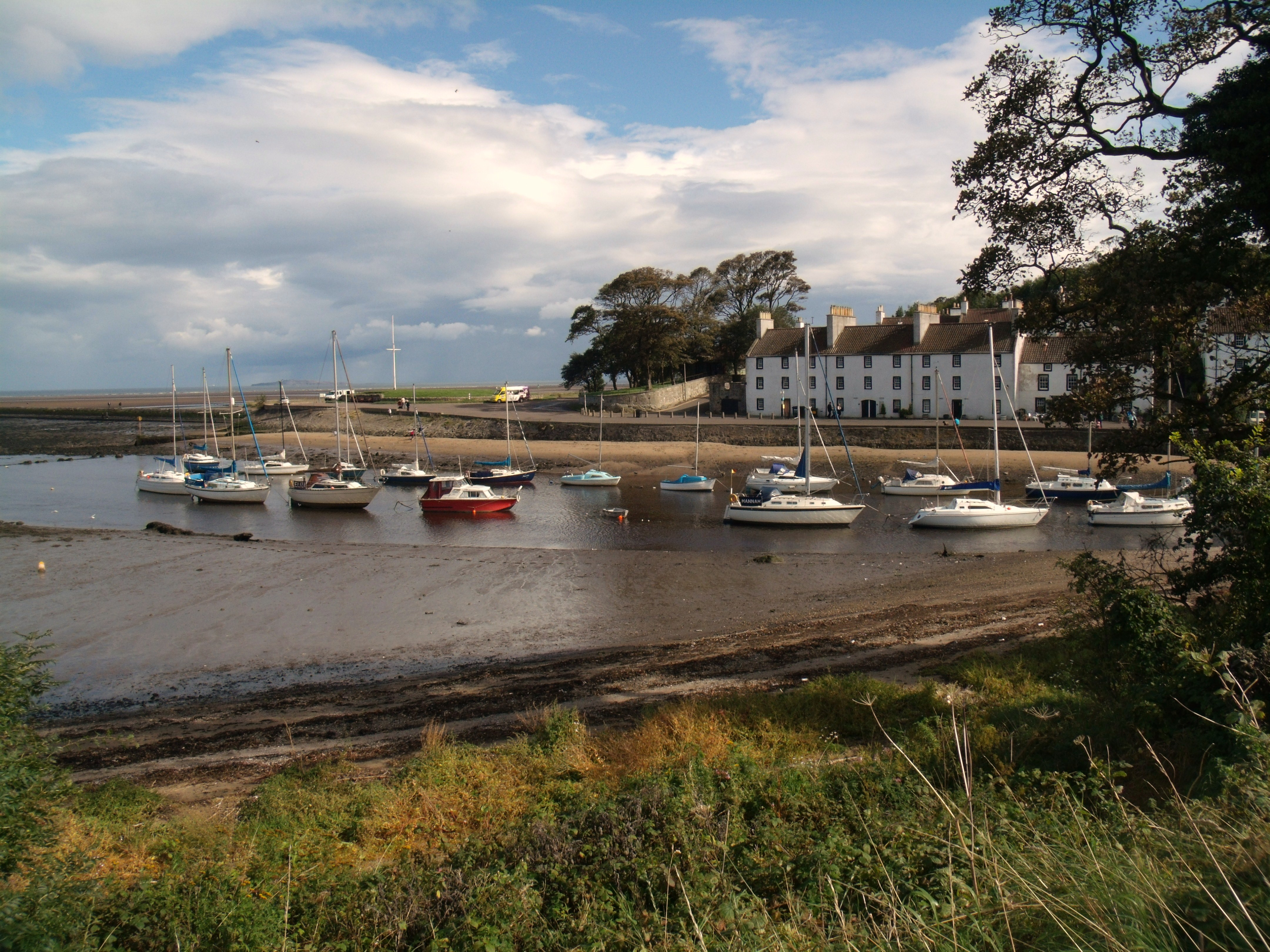
Boats moored in the mouth of the Almond

The River Almond (Scottish Gaelic: Abhainn Amain) is a river in Lothian, Scotland. It is approximately 28 miles (45 km) long, rising at Cant Hills in North Lanarkshire north of Shotts, running through West Lothian and draining into the Firth of Forth at Cramond, Edinburgh. The name Almond/Amon is simply old Celtic for "river".

== Environment ==
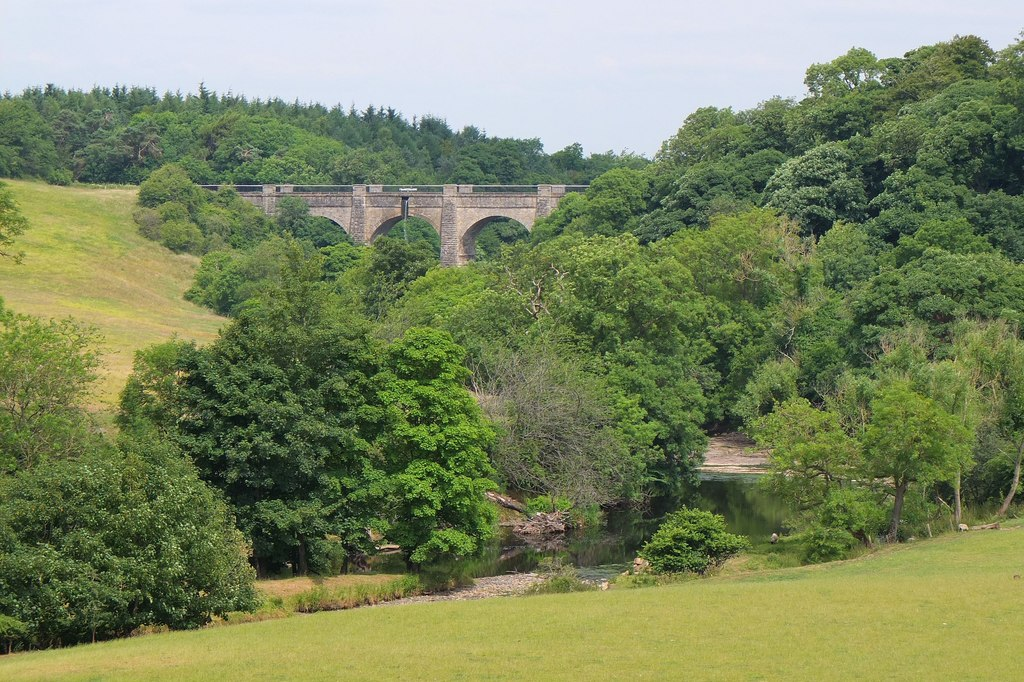
The river flowing beneath the Almond Aqueduct, part of the Union Canal

Running through areas that were dominated for much of the 20th century by heavy industry and shale- and coal mining, the River Almond has long been notorious for its high levels of pollution.

With the demise of mining and heavy industry in Central Scotland, the river became cleaner, and it is being actively repopulated by wildlife: there is a healthy population of brown trout and there are improving runs of both Atlantic salmon (Salmo salar) and sea trout (Salmo trutta). There is also a good array of birds to be seen around the river banks, including dippers, kingfishers and grey herons, and increasing numbers of otters are being reported.

The river is still the primary means by which southern West Lothian's wastewater is transported to the sea. Although the introduction of a number of water treatment plants have helped to mitigate the river’s pollution, it still suffers from high levels of detergent pollution and run-off from agricultural land. This has caused it to often have what has been described as a distinct "chemical odour". This odour is most noticeable in the part of the river that runs through Almondell and Calderwood Country Park, where there is a major outfall from the nearby East Calder treatment plant.

Fishing on the river is leased from the Crown Estate and permits are required. Fishing on the upper Almond (up to Kirkliston) is managed by the West Lothian Angling Association and on the lower Almond (Kirkliston to Cramond) by the Cramond Angling Club.

The mouth of the Almond at Cramond formerly had a small passenger ferry. In 1997, the ferryman discovered the Cramond Lioness, a Roman-era sculpture, in the mud of the river bed. The sculpture is now in the Museum of Scotland in Edinburgh.

== River route ==
The river begins its journey at Cant Hills north of Shotts, North Lanarkshire and runs past Whitburn, Blackburn and Seafield towards Kirkton and then through the centre of Livingston. After exiting Livingston it passes Mid Calder, East Calder, Newbridge, Kirkliston, Edinburgh Airport and towards the mouth of the river at Cramond, where it joins the Firth of Forth near Cramond Island.

== Riverside landmarks ==
Illieston Castle is on the river, near the Almond Aqueduct. The Stewart kings James II and James IV are said to have had a hunting lodge at Illieston. The present three-storey house is probably of late 16th century or early 17th century date. It was purchased by John Ellis, an advocate in Edinburgh, around 1663. He added a Renaissance gateway inscribed with his initials and the date 1665. Later it became the property of the Earl of Hopetoun. It is now a private house.

The industrial heritage of central Scotland can be observed along the length of the river with numerous weirs, remains of mills and other riverside industries of the past.

=== Bridges ===
The following are the bridges that cross the River Almond, ordered from the river's source to mouth:

- Footbridge and road bridge at Harthill
- Four footbridges and a road bridge at Polkemmet Country Park
- Armadale Road bridge
- Road bridge north of East Whitburn
- A801 road bridge
- Swinabby
- Footbridge west of Blackburn
- Blackburn Village Bridge
- A705 road bridge
- Blackburn Road bridge
- Blackburnhall Road
- Footbridge south of Seafield
- Simpson Parkway bridge
- Charlesfield Bridge
- Livingston Bridge
- Footbridge south of Livingston Village
- Alderstone Road bridge
- Footbridge east of Almondvale Stadium
- The Bridge to Remembrance
- Two footbridges near Livi Skate Park
- Howden South Road bridge
- Howden Bridge
- Almond Valley Bridge
- Almondbank Path footbridge
- Almond Path footbridge
- North Bridge
- Almondell footbridge
- Almondell Viaduct
- Almondell Aqueduct
- Nasmyth Bridge
- Mandela Bridge
- Almond Aqueduct
- Birdsmill Motorway Bridge
- Birdsmill Viaduct
- Almond Valley Viaduct
- New Bridge
- A89 road bridge
- M9 road bridge
- Maitland Bridge
- Two footbridges south of Kirkliston
- Boathouse Bridge
- Almond Viaduct
- Grotto Bridge
- Cramond New Bridge
- Cramond Old Bridge

== Almond Feeder ==
The Almond Feeder, also known as the Union Canal Feeder, is the main water source of the Union Canal. At East Calder the River Almond passes over a weir which supplies the feeder which carries water into the Union Canal. Due to the height difference where the river passes under the canal, this feeder runs eastwards for 3 kilometres (1.9 miles) before reaching the canal at the Almond Aqueduct. The feeder has multiple tunnels and crosses the River Almond itself via the Almondell Aqueduct. By following paths through the country park and along private land to the east, it is possible to follow the river and feeder all the way to the Union Canal.

== See also ==
- List of rivers of Scotland
- History of the oil shale industry
