= Birdsmill Viaduct =

Railway viaduct in Scotland

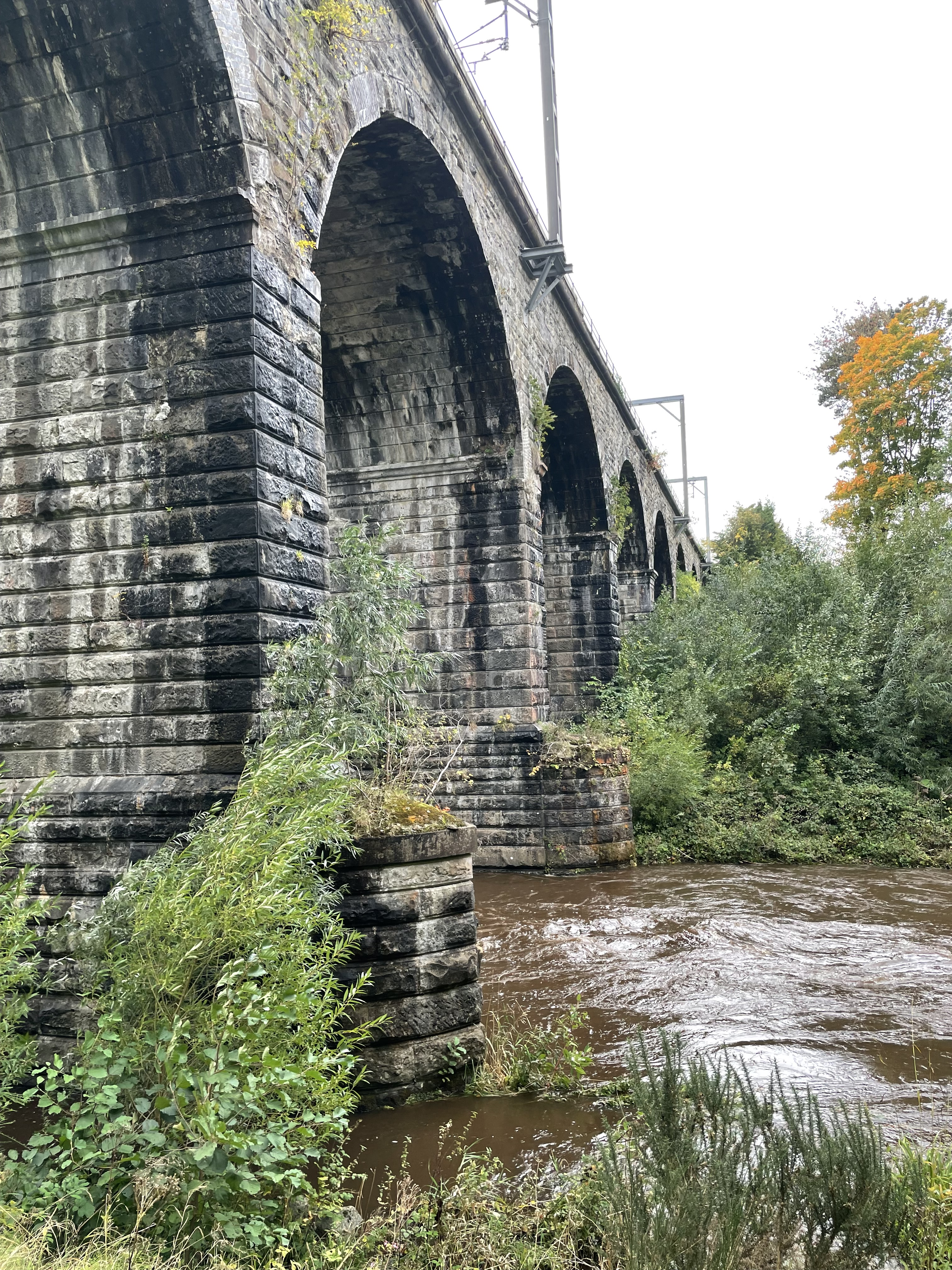
- Birdsmill Viaduct crossing the River Almond
- Coordinates: 55.9265°N 3.4288°W
- Carries: Edinburgh–Bathgate line
- Crosses: River Almond
- Preceded by: Birdsmill Motorway Bridge
- Followed by: Almond Valley Viaduct

Characteristics
- Total length: 111 metres (364 ft)
- Height: 15.2 metres (50 ft)
- No. of spans: 8

History
- Designer: John Miller
- Opened: 1849

Listed Building – Category B
- Official name: Birdsmill Railway Viaduct, River Almond (Off M8)
- Designated: 21 January 1971
- Reference no.: LB26813

Location
- Interactive map of Birdsmill Viaduct

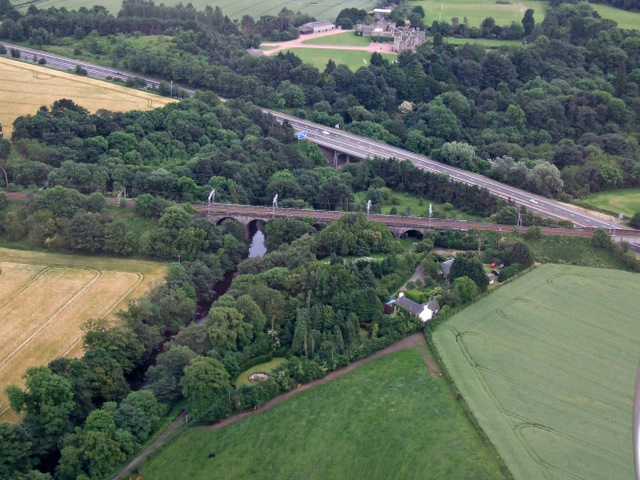
Birdsmill Viaduct next to the M8 motorway

The Birdsmill Viaduct is a railway viaduct on the boundary between West Lothian and Edinburgh in Scotland. The viaduct carries the Edinburgh-Bathgate line across the River Almond.

The viaduct was designed by engineer John Miller and completed in 1849. It has 8 stone arches and a length of 111 metres (364 ft) and a height of 15.2 metres (50 ft). It was designated a category B listed building in 1971.

== See also ==
- List of railway bridges and viaducts in the United Kingdom
