= List of listed buildings in Kirknewton, West Lothian =

Kirknewton parish shown within West Lothian

This is a list of listed buildings in the parish of Kirknewton in West Lothian, Scotland.

== List ==
Name	Location	Date Listed	Grid Ref. (Note: Sometimes known as OSGB36, the grid reference (where provided) is based on the British national grid reference system used by the Ordnance Survey. • "Guide to National Grid". Ordnance Survey. • "Get-a-map". Ordnance Survey.)	Geo-coordinates	Notes	LB Number (Note: Historic Environment Scotland assign a unique alphanumeric identifier to each designated site in Scotland, for listed buildings this always begins with "LB", for example "LB12345".)	Image
Old Linburn House Sundial In Walled Garden				55°53′57″N 3°24′25″W	Category B	7359	Upload Photo
Ainville Farm-House				55°51′25″N 3°25′41″W	Category B	7363	Upload Photo
Kirknewton, Station Road, Parish Church (Church Of Scotland) And Halls Including Boundary Walls				55°53′17″N 3°25′52″W	Category C(S)	50535	Upload another image
Hill House				55°53′22″N 3°24′41″W	Category B	7352	Upload Photo
South Gateway Hatton Estate				55°54′04″N 3°23′46″W	Category A	7355	Upload another image See more images
East Calder Village St. Cuthbert's Church				55°53′41″N 3°27′58″W	Category B	7366	Upload another image See more images
2, 4 Smithybrae				55°53′15″N 3°25′07″W	Category C(S)	7383	Upload Photo
Ormiston Hill House				55°52′56″N 3°26′22″W	Category C(S)	13646	Upload Photo
South Gate-Way Almondell Park				55°53′51″N 3°27′19″W	Category B	7369	Upload Photo
Maconochies Of Meadowbank Burial Enclosure Kirknewton Burial Ground				55°53′15″N 3°25′04″W	Category B	7384	Upload another image
Merivil Cottage				55°53′40″N 3°28′01″W	Category B	13647	Upload Photo
Ormiston House				55°53′02″N 3°26′29″W	Category B	7358	Upload Photo
Leithhead Farm, By The Water Of Leith				55°51′27″N 3°25′01″W	Category C(S)	7364	Upload Photo
Kirknewton, Easter Colzium				55°48′44″N 3°27′55″W	Category C(S)	43570	Upload Photo
Kirknewton Station, Station House				55°53′21″N 3°26′01″W	Category B	13466	Upload another image See more images
Lodges, 19 And 21 Whitemoss Road, And Gate, Kirknewton Village				55°53′10″N 3°25′09″W	Category B	7348	Upload Photo
Waterloo Tower				55°53′40″N 3°23′58″W	Category B	7354	Upload Photo
Bridge Gogar Burn, Ormiston Estate				55°53′04″N 3°26′25″W	Category C(S)	7361	Upload Photo
Railway Viaduct, Linhouse Water				55°52′03″N 3°28′37″W	Category A	7365	Upload another image See more images
Dr. Cullen Burial Enclosure				55°53′15″N 3°25′03″W	Category B	7351	Upload another image See more images
Easter Newton Farm-House				55°53′17″N 3°24′14″W	Category B	7353	Upload Photo
Millrigg Farmhouse				55°53′26″N 3°26′25″W	Category B	7357	Upload Photo
14, 16, 18, 20, 22 And 24 Main Street				55°53′16″N 3°25′08″W	Category C(S)	7382	Upload another image
Kirknewton, Station Road, The Old School House				55°53′17″N 3°25′51″W	Category C(S)	50536	Upload Photo
Ormiston Mains Steading				55°53′18″N 3°26′26″W	Category C(S)	7360	Upload Photo
Raw Farm-House				55°53′49″N 3°26′59″W	Category C(S)	7367	Upload Photo
Overshiel Farm-House				55°54′15″N 3°26′28″W	Category B	7368	Upload Photo
Canal Feeder Aqueduct, River Almond				55°54′04″N 3°27′46″W	Category A	7371	Upload another image See more images
Mineral Railway Viaduct, River Almond				55°54′00″N 3°27′47″W	Category B	7372	Upload another image See more images
'sawmill House', 5 Whitemoss Road				55°53′14″N 3°25′11″W	Category C(S)	7381	Upload Photo
East Gate-Lodge And Gate-Way Linburn Park				55°54′03″N 3°23′59″W	Category B	7356	Upload Photo
Kirknewton House				55°53′00″N 3°24′57″W	Category B	7362	Upload Photo
Almondell Bridge, River Almond				55°54′14″N 3°27′36″W	Category A	7370	Upload another image
Raw Camps Lime Kilns				55°54′00″N 3°26′49″W	Category B	7373	Upload Photo

== Key ==
The scheme for classifying buildings in Scotland is:

- Category A: "buildings of national or international importance, either architectural or historic; or fine, little-altered examples of some particular period, style or building type."
- Category B: "buildings of regional or more than local importance; or major examples of some particular period, style or building type, which may have been altered."
- Category C: "buildings of local importance; lesser examples of any period, style, or building type, as originally constructed or moderately altered; and simple traditional buildings which group well with other listed buildings."

In March 2016 there were 47,288 listed buildings in Scotland. Of these, 8% were Category A, and 50% were Category B, with the remaining 42% being Category C.
