= Almondell Aqueduct =

Aqueduct and footbridge in Scotland

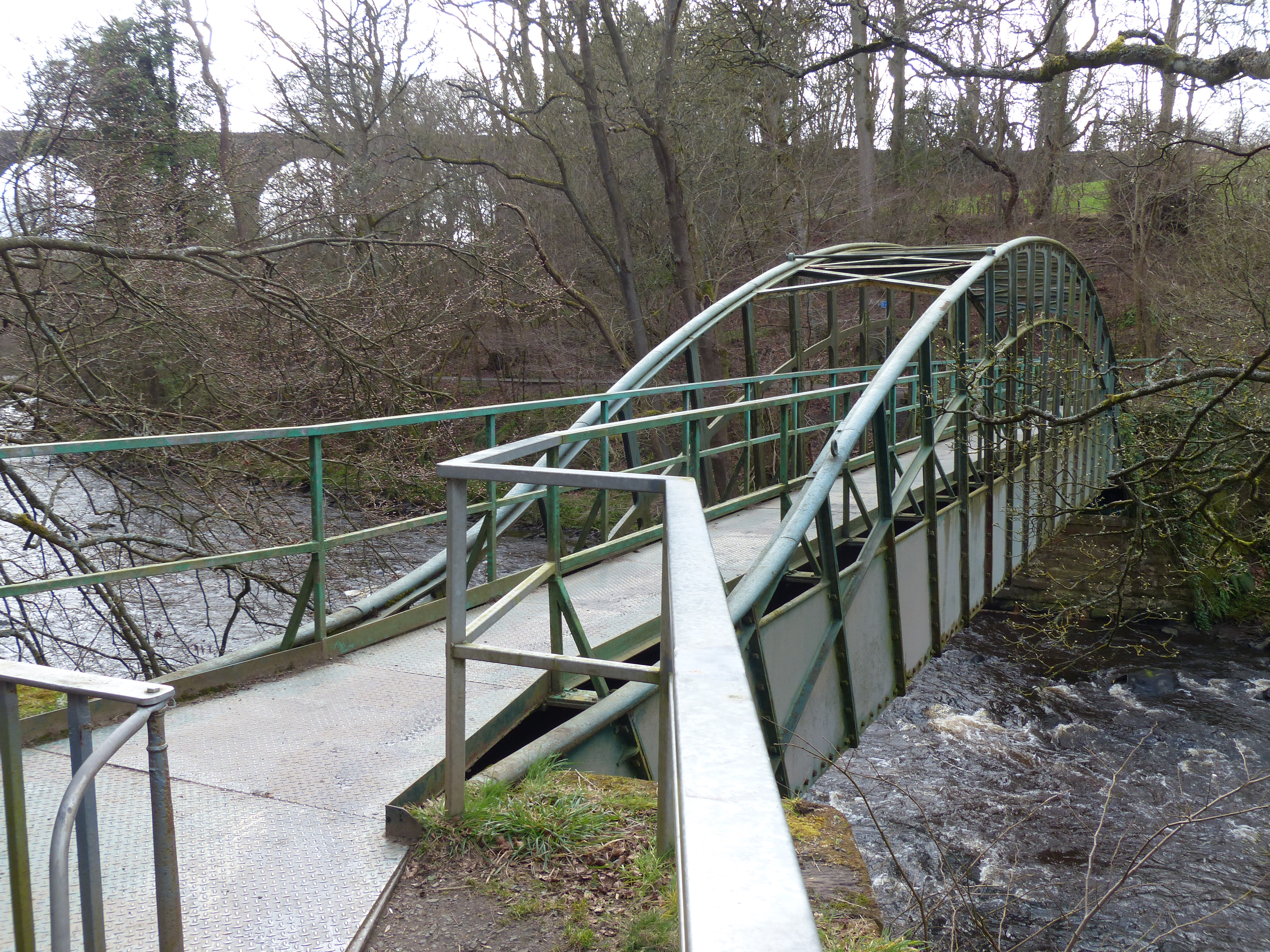
- Almondell Aqueduct crossing the River Almond
- Coordinates: 55.9012°N 3.4627°W
- OS grid reference: NT 08640 68528
- Carries: Almond Feeder; 75
- Crosses: River Almond
- Locale: West Lothian
- Maintained by: Scottish Canals
- Preceded by: Almondell Viaduct
- Followed by: Nasmyth Bridge

Characteristics
- Total length: 25 metres (82 ft)
- Width: 1.8 metres (5 ft 11 in)

History
- Designer: Hugh Baird
- Construction end: c. 1822

Listed Building – Category A
- Official name: Canal Feeder Aqueduct, River Almond
- Designated: 21 January 1971
- Reference no.: LB7371

Location
- Interactive map of Almondell Aqueduct

The Almondell Aqueduct is a dual-purpose bridge in West Lothian, Scotland that crosses the River Almond. The bridge carries the Almond Feeder which supplies water to the Union Canal and the National Cycle Route 75. The bridge was built c. 1822 and was designated a category A listed building in 1971.

== Design ==
The Almondell Aqueduct is both a footbridge and an aqueduct engineered by Hugh Baird. The structure is an arch bridge with a length of 25 metres and a width of 1.8 metres. It has a cast-iron trough aqueduct that carries the water across the River Almond and above is a cast-iron walkway.

== Gallery ==
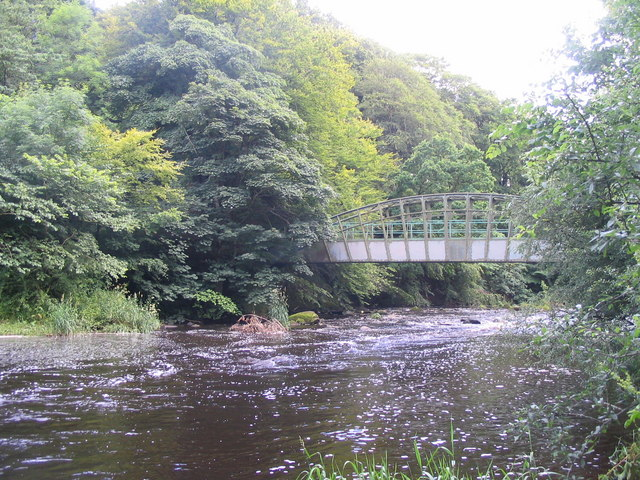

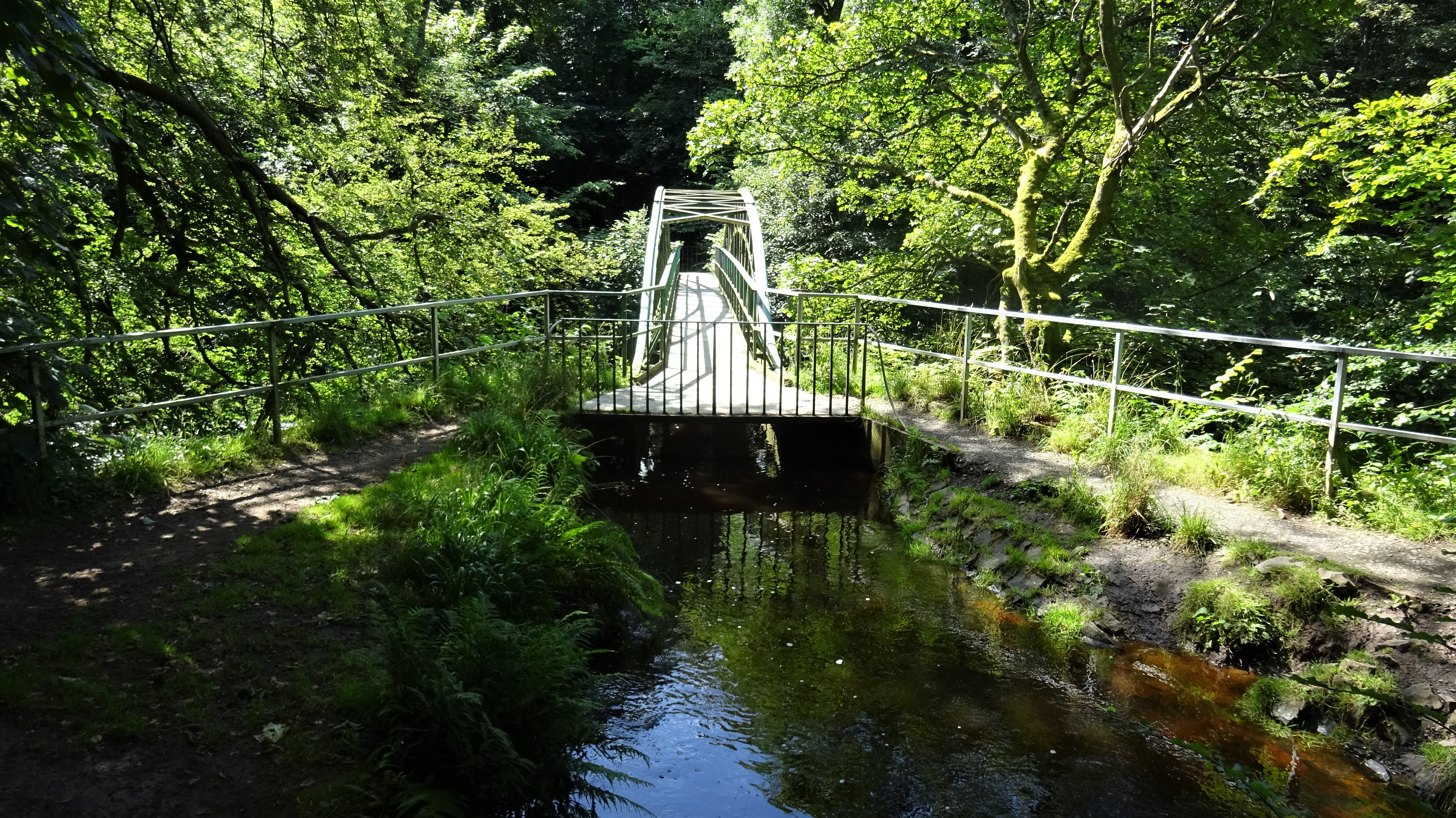

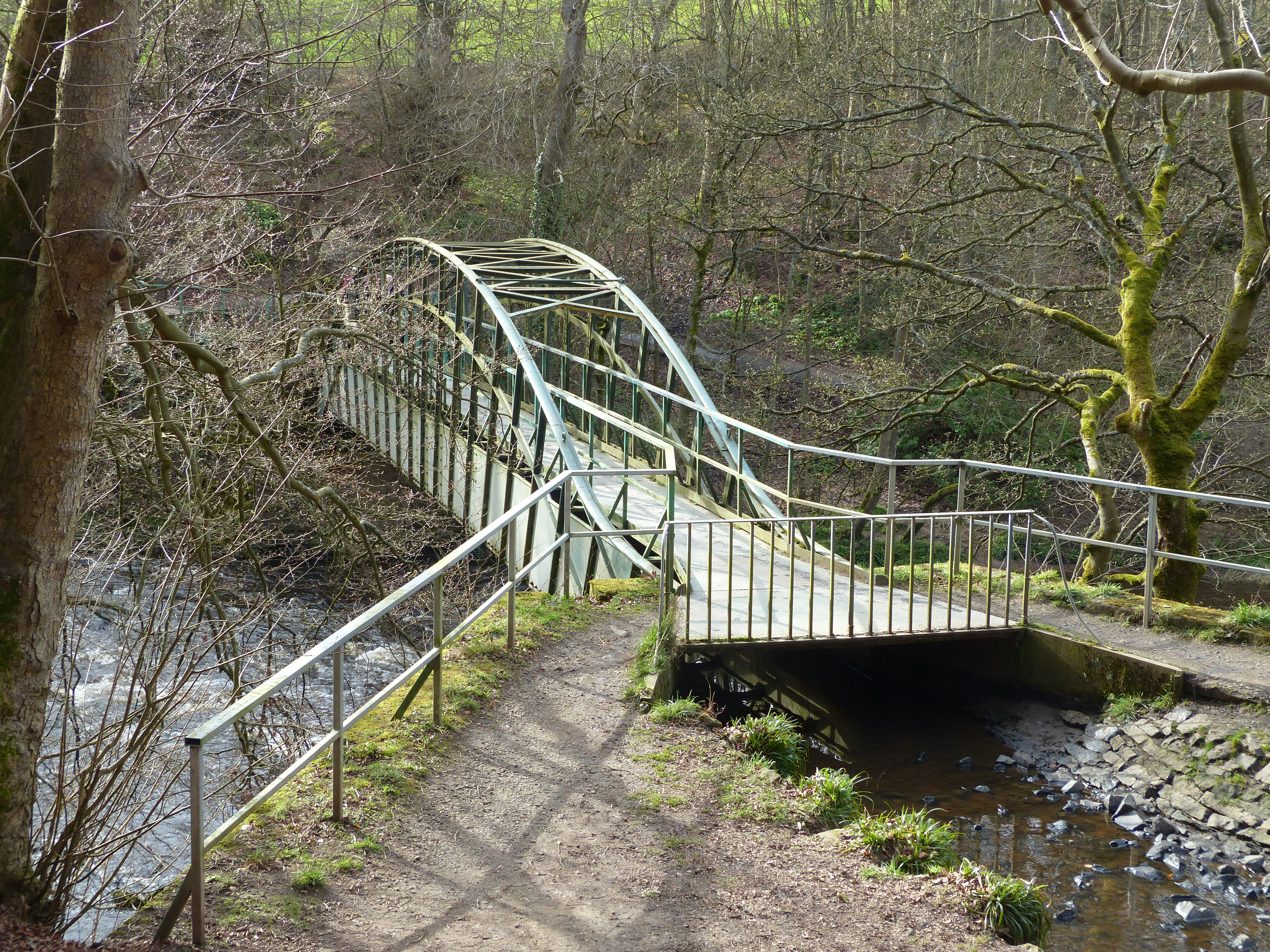

== See also ==
- List of bridges in Scotland
