= Almond Valley Viaduct =

19th century bridge in West Lothian, Scotland

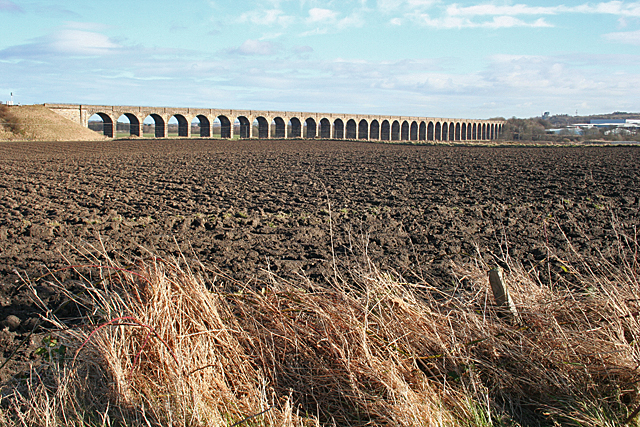
- The viaduct viewed from afar
- Coordinates: 55.9346°N 3.4229°W
- Carries: Glasgow-Edinburgh via Falkirk line
- Crosses: River Almond
- Preceded by: Birdsmill Viaduct
- Followed by: New Bridge

Characteristics
- Total length: 622 metres (2,041 ft)
- Height: 18 metres (59 ft)
- No. of spans: 36

History
- Opened: 1842

Listed Building – Category A
- Official name: Almond Valley Viaduct
- Designated: 22 February 1971
- Reference no.: LB7428

Location
- Interactive map of Almond Valley Viaduct

The Almond Valley Viaduct is a large Victorian railway viaduct on the boundary between West Lothian and Edinburgh in Scotland. The viaduct is 622 metres (2,041 ft) long and has 36 masonry arches, making it one of the longest viaducts in Scotland. It is Category A Listed.

== History ==
The viaduct was designed by the engineer John Miller and constructed by John Gibb. It opened in 1842 to carry the newly completed Edinburgh and Glasgow Railway (today the Glasgow-Edinburgh via Falkirk line) over the River Almond. It is known simply as "The Arches" locally.

The viaduct was designed so the railway was kept as level as possible with a planned maximum gradient of 1 in 880, ensuring the Edinburgh and Glasgow Railway was the most level main line in the UK at the time.

As it is situated between Broxburn (in West Lothian) and Newbridge / Ratho (on the periphery of the City of Edinburgh council area, the viaduct is sometimes known by those names; however, there is another Broxburn Viaduct immediately to the west which carries the same railway lines over the A89 road and Brox Burn, and another viaduct over the Almond on the approach to Newbridge / Ratho a short distance to the south, carrying the North Clyde Line railway, which is more commonly known as Birdsmill Viaduct (to add to the potential confusion, the Broxburn Viaduct is considered by some to be part of the Almond Valley Viaduct, and the properties lending their name to Birdsmill Viaduct are accessed from a road of that name which leads off the A89 under the Broxburn Viaduct). Both of these bridges are also listed structures.

== See also ==
- List of Category A listed buildings in West Lothian
- List of listed buildings in Kirkliston, West Lothian
- List of railway bridges and viaducts in the United Kingdom
