= List of listed buildings in Uphall, West Lothian =

Uphall parish shown within West Lothian

This is a list of listed buildings in the parish of Uphall in West Lothian, Scotland.

== List ==
Name	Location	Date Listed	Grid Ref. (Note: Sometimes known as OSGB36, the grid reference (where provided) is based on the British national grid reference system used by the Ordnance Survey. • "Guide to National Grid". Ordnance Survey. • "Get-a-map". Ordnance Survey.)	Geo-coordinates	Notes	LB Number (Note: Historic Environment Scotland assign a unique alphanumeric identifier to each designated site in Scotland, for listed buildings this always begins with "LB", for example "LB12345".)	Image
Uphall Kirk (St. Nicholas)				55°56′01″N 3°30′23″W	Category B	14235	Upload another image
Middleton Hall				55°55′43″N 3°30′13″W	Category C(S)	14242	Upload Photo
Houstoun House				55°55′33″N 3°31′04″W	Category A	14243	Upload another image
St John Cantius And St Nicholas Roman Catholic Church And Shrine In Grounds West Main Street Broxburn				55°56′04″N 3°28′36″W	Category B	19222	Upload Photo
Almondell Coach-House And Stables				55°54′26″N 3°27′21″W	Category C(S)	14227	Upload another image
Almondell Bridge				55°54′14″N 3°27′36″W	Category A	14228	Upload another image See more images
Union Canal Bridge, 28				55°56′27″N 3°27′50″W	Category C(S)	14233	Upload Photo
25 And 27, 29 Ecclesmachan Road Upper Uphall				55°56′00″N 3°30′27″W	Category C(S)	14237	Upload Photo
Crossgreen Farm 26 Ecclesmachan Road Uphall				55°55′52″N 3°30′27″W	Category C(S)	14239	Upload Photo
Union Canal Bridge 24 Hawthorn Brae				55°55′36″N 3°28′27″W	Category C(S)	14230	Upload Photo
Oatridge Hotel, East Main Street				55°55′47″N 3°30′21″W	Category B	14241	Upload Photo
Uphall, 41 West Main Street				55°55′43″N 3°30′36″W	Category C(S)	49642	Upload Photo
Union Canal Bridge, 29				55°56′34″N 3°27′30″W	Category C(S)	14234	Upload Photo
Union Canal Bridge 23 Drumshoreland Station Road				55°55′32″N 3°28′05″W	Category C(S)	14229	Upload another image See more images
Uphall Old Manse, Ecclesmachan Rd				55°56′04″N 3°30′23″W	Category C(S)	14236	Upload Photo
Sundial At Houstoun House				55°55′32″N 3°31′04″W	Category C(S)	14244	Upload Photo
Kirkhill House				55°56′07″N 3°29′00″W	Category B	19678	Upload Photo
Astronomical Stone (In Walled Garden And Pillars, Kirkhill				55°56′06″N 3°29′01″W	Category B	14232	Upload Photo
28, 30 Ecclesmachan Road Uphall				55°55′53″N 3°30′28″W	Category C(S)	14240	Upload Photo
Union Canal Bridge 25 Broxburn				55°55′51″N 3°28′39″W	Category C(S)	14231	Upload Photo
47 Ecclesmachan Road Upper Uphall				55°56′07″N 3°30′26″W	Category C(S)	14238	Upload Photo
Houstoun Doocot				55°55′33″N 3°31′01″W	Category C(S)	14226	Upload Photo
Houstoun Coach-House And Stables (Known As The Dower House)				55°55′33″N 3°31′05″W	Category B	14245	Upload Photo

== Key ==
The scheme for classifying buildings in Scotland is:

- Category A: "buildings of national or international importance, either architectural or historic; or fine, little-altered examples of some particular period, style or building type."
- Category B: "buildings of regional or more than local importance; or major examples of some particular period, style or building type, which may have been altered."
- Category C: "buildings of local importance; lesser examples of any period, style, or building type, as originally constructed or moderately altered; and simple traditional buildings which group well with other listed buildings."

In March 2016 there were 47,288 listed buildings in Scotland. Of these, 8% were Category A, and 50% were Category B, with the remaining 42% being Category C.
