= Moss Side (disambiguation) =

Moss Side is a district of Manchester, England.

Moss Side may also refer to:

== Places ==
=== United Kingdom ===
- Moss-Side, County Antrim, a village in the Causeway Coast and Glens Borough Council area of Northern Ireland
- Moss Side, Cumbria, a hamlet
- Moss Side, Fylde, a hamlet in Westby-with-Plumptons, Lancashire

- Moss Side railway station, on the line between Blackpool South and Preston

- Moss Side, Knowsley, in the Metropolitan Borough of Knowsley, Merseyside
- Moss Side, Sefton, a suburb of Maghull
- Moss Side, South Ribble, a village near Leyland, Lancashire

=== United States ===
- Moss Side (Versailles, Kentucky), listed on the National Register of Historic Places in Woodford County, Kentucky
- Moss Side (New Kent County, Virginia), a historic farm property

== See also ==
- Moss Side Story, a 1989 album by Barry Adamson, a native of Moss Side, Manchester
