= List of listed buildings in Whitburn, West Lothian =

Whitburn parish shown within West Lothian

This is a list of listed buildings in the parish of Whitburn in West Lothian, Scotland.

== List ==
Name	Location	Date Listed	Grid Ref. (Note: Sometimes known as OSGB36, the grid reference (where provided) is based on the British national grid reference system used by the Ordnance Survey. • "Guide to National Grid". Ordnance Survey. • "Get-a-map". Ordnance Survey.)	Geo-coordinates	Notes	LB Number (Note: Historic Environment Scotland assign a unique alphanumeric identifier to each designated site in Scotland, for listed buildings this always begins with "LB", for example "LB12345".)	Image
East Main Street, Brucefield Church (Church Of Scotland) With Courtyard And Church Halls (Including Former Church)				55°51′59″N 3°40′55″W	Category A	51254	Upload another image See more images
East Whitburn House				55°52′04″N 3°39′47″W	Category C(S)	14203	Upload Photo
Whitburn Parish Kirk (South Church) Manse Road				55°51′47″N 3°41′03″W	Category B	42184	Upload another image
Fauldhouse, Crofthead Primary School, Sheephousehill				55°49′45″N 3°41′52″W	Category B	18984	Upload Photo
Blackburn Village, Bridge, River Almond				55°52′14″N 3°37′25″W	Category B	14202	Upload Photo

== Key ==
The scheme for classifying buildings in Scotland is:

- Category A: "buildings of national or international importance, either architectural or historic; or fine, little-altered examples of some particular period, style or building type."
- Category B: "buildings of regional or more than local importance; or major examples of some particular period, style or building type, which may have been altered."
- Category C: "buildings of local importance; lesser examples of any period, style, or building type, as originally constructed or moderately altered; and simple traditional buildings which group well with other listed buildings."

In March 2016 there were 47,288 listed buildings in Scotland. Of these, 8% were Category A, and 50% were Category B, with the remaining 42% being Category C.
