= List of listed buildings in Bathgate, West Lothian =

This is a list of listed buildings in the parish of Bathgate, in West Lothian, Scotland.

== List ==
Name	Location	Date Listed	Grid Ref. (Note: Sometimes known as OSGB36, the grid reference (where provided) is based on the British national grid reference system used by the Ordnance Survey. • "Guide to National Grid". Ordnance Survey. • "Get-a-map". Ordnance Survey.)	Geo-coordinates	Notes	LB Number (Note: Historic Environment Scotland assign a unique alphanumeric identifier to each designated site in Scotland, for listed buildings this always begins with "LB", for example "LB12345".)	Image
Armadale, West Main Street, The Goth				55°53′55″N 3°42′08″W	Category C(S)	45571	Upload another image See more images
22 Livery Street Including Outbuildings To Rear				55°54′10″N 3°38′32″W	Category C(S)	22126	Upload another image
Marjoribanks Street, Evangical Union Congregational / United Reformed Church Including Halls, Boundary Walls And Gatepiers				55°54′11″N 3°38′13″W	Category C(S)	50608	Upload Photo
19, 21 George Place, Pavilion Bingo (Former Pavilion Cinema)				55°54′01″N 3°38′29″W	Category C(S)	51105	Upload another image
Bathgate Academy				55°54′02″N 3°38′01″W	Category A	22125	Upload another image See more images
9, 11 Mansefield Street				55°54′10″N 3°38′35″W	Category C(S)	22127	Upload Photo
Easter Inch Farmhouse And Steading				55°53′20″N 3°37′06″W	Category B	6713	Upload Photo
Armadale, Academy Street And High Academy Street, Armadale Primary And Nursery School And Former Infant School Including Boundary Walls And Gatepiers				55°53′50″N 3°42′15″W	Category C(S)	48978	Upload another image
Livery Street, Church Of The Immaculate Conception (St Mary's) (Roman Catholic), Including Boundary Walls, Gatepiers And Railings				55°54′12″N 3°38′31″W	Category C(S)	50544	Upload another image
Jarvey Street, High Church Of Scotland With Graveyard, Boundary Walls, Railings And Gatepiers				55°54′15″N 3°38′25″W	Category B	22129	Upload another image
24-34 (Even Nos) North Bridge Street, The Regal Community Theatre (Former Regal Cinema)				55°54′08″N 3°38′41″W	Category B	45918	Upload Photo
George Street, St David's Church (Church Of Scotland) With Bell Tower, Church Halls And Boundary Walls				55°54′07″N 3°38′31″W	Category B	22128	Upload Photo

== Key ==
The scheme for classifying buildings in Scotland is:

- Category A: "buildings of national or international importance, either architectural or historic; or fine, little-altered examples of some particular period, style or building type."
- Category B: "buildings of regional or more than local importance; or major examples of some particular period, style or building type, which may have been altered."
- Category C: "buildings of local importance; lesser examples of any period, style, or building type, as originally constructed or moderately altered; and simple traditional buildings which group well with other listed buildings."

In March 2016 there were 47,288 listed buildings in Scotland. Of these, 8% were Category A, and 50% were Category B, with the remaining 42% being Category C.
