= List of listed buildings in Abercorn, West Lothian =

Abercorn parish shown within West Lothian

This is a list of listed buildings in the parish of Abercorn in West Lothian, Scotland.

== List ==
Name	Location	Date Listed	Grid Ref. (Note: Sometimes known as OSGB36, the grid reference (where provided) is based on the British national grid reference system used by the Ordnance Survey. • "Guide to National Grid". Ordnance Survey. • "Get-a-map". Ordnance Survey.)	Geo-coordinates	Notes	LB Number (Note: Historic Environment Scotland assign a unique alphanumeric identifier to each designated site in Scotland, for listed buildings this always begins with "LB", for example "LB12345".)	Image
Philipstoun Station, Union Canal, Bridge 39				55°58′31″N 3°31′03″W	Category C(S)	6430	Upload another image
Summer House I, Hopetoun Policies				55°59′49″N 3°28′12″W	Category B	618	Upload Photo
East Gate, Hopetoun Policies				55°59′40″N 3°26′38″W	Category B	624	Upload another image
Craigton House				55°58′29″N 3°29′16″W	Category B	6423	Upload another image
Old East Gate, Hopetoun Policies				55°59′32″N 3°26′37″W	Category B	5649	Upload Photo
Hopetoun House				55°59′43″N 3°27′46″W	Category A	613	Upload another image
Hopetoun Estate Buildings				55°59′39″N 3°27′36″W	Category A	614	Upload Photo
Stoney Hill Gate (Obelisk Gate)				55°59′29″N 3°27′14″W	Category B	621	Upload Photo
Duddingstone Icehouse				55°59′12″N 3°26′24″W	Category C(S)	627	Upload Photo
Craigton, Sundial				55°58′28″N 3°29′16″W	Category C(S)	6424	Upload Photo
Stone Couple, Union Canal, Bridge 36				55°58′24″N 3°29′40″W	Category C(S)	6427	Upload Photo
Obelisk Cottage				55°59′31″N 3°27′11″W	Category B	622	Upload Photo
Society House, Hopetoun Policies				55°59′45″N 3°26′55″W	Category B	623	Upload Photo
Woodend, Norwood				55°58′51″N 3°27′45″W	Category C(S)	628	Upload Photo
Woodend, Hopetoun Estate Cottages (Nos 1-5)				55°58′52″N 3°27′48″W	Category C(S)	629	Upload Photo
Cockmuir, Union Canal, Bridge 37				55°58′25″N 3°30′09″W	Category C(S)	6428	Upload Photo
Philipstoun House				55°59′01″N 3°29′54″W	Category B	6431	Upload another image
Philipstoun House, Dovecote				55°59′07″N 3°29′59″W	Category B	6432	Upload Photo
The Binns				55°59′17″N 3°31′26″W	Category A	632	Upload another image
West Lodge, Hopetoun Policies				55°59′35″N 3°28′47″W	Category B	615	Upload another image
Summer House II ("The Pulpit"), Hopetoun Policies				55°59′33″N 3°27′56″W	Category B	619	Upload Photo
Duddingstone House				55°59′00″N 3°26′28″W	Category B	625	Upload Photo
Duntarvie Castle				55°58′22″N 3°27′32″W	Category A	6422	Upload another image
Craigton, Union Canal, Bridge 35				55°58′22″N 3°29′25″W	Category B	6426	Upload Photo
Fawnspark, Union Canal, Bridge 38				55°58′27″N 3°30′31″W	Category C(S)	6429	Upload another image
Abercorn Kirk				55°59′46″N 3°28′27″W	Category A	612	Upload another image
Nethermill Bridge, Hopetoun Policies				55°59′52″N 3°28′36″W	Category C(S)	617	Upload another image
Midhope Castle				55°59′32″N 3°29′16″W	Category A	630	Upload another image
Midhope Doocot				55°59′29″N 3°29′12″W	Category B	631	Upload another image
Binns Tower, Binns Hill				55°59′27″N 3°31′13″W	Category B	633	Upload another image
Abercorn House, (Former Manse) Including North Courtyard Range And Walls, Walled Garden And Linked Outbuildings, Entrance Gatepiers And Boundary Walls				55°59′41″N 3°28′29″W	Category C(S)	50231	Upload another image
Craigton, Gatepiers				55°58′28″N 3°29′22″W	Category C(S)	6425	Upload Photo
Hopetoun Mausoleum, Hopetoun Policies				55°59′43″N 3°28′23″W	Category B	616	Upload Photo
Duddingstone Steading				55°59′00″N 3°26′33″W	Category B	626	Upload Photo
Abercorn School and Former School Master's House				55°58′47″N 3°29′18″W	Category C(S)	48419	Upload another image

== Key ==
The scheme for classifying buildings in Scotland is:

- Category A: "buildings of national or international importance, either architectural or historic; or fine, little-altered examples of some particular period, style or building type."
- Category B: "buildings of regional or more than local importance; or major examples of some particular period, style or building type, which may have been altered."
- Category C: "buildings of local importance; lesser examples of any period, style, or building type, as originally constructed or moderately altered; and simple traditional buildings which group well with other listed buildings."

In March 2016 there were 47,288 listed buildings in Scotland. Of these, 8% were Category A, and 50% were Category B, with the remaining 42% being Category C.
