= Broxburn Viaduct =

Railway viaduct in Scotland

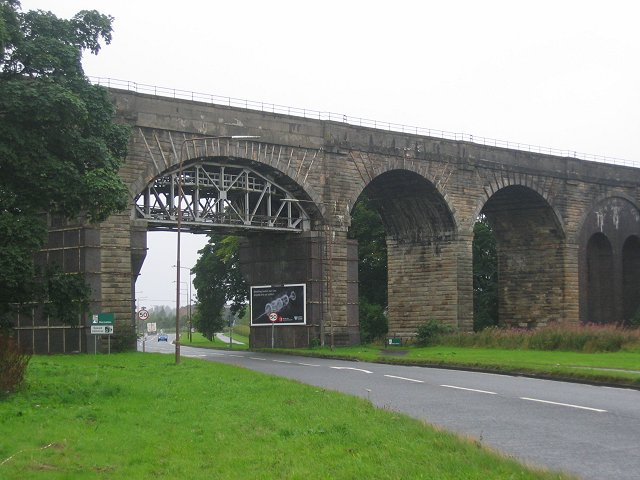
- Broxburn Viaduct crossing the A89 road
- Coordinates: 55.9374°N 3.4330°W
- Carries: Glasgow–Edinburgh via Falkirk line
- Crosses: A89 and Brox Burn

Characteristics
- Total length: 127 metres (417 ft)
- Height: 16.8 metres (55 ft)
- No. of spans: 7

History
- Opened: 1842

Listed Building – Category A
- Official name: Railway Viaduct, Broxburn-newbridge Road
- Designated: 21 February 1971
- Reference no.: LB7427

Location
- Interactive map of Broxburn Viaduct

The Broxburn Viaduct is a railway viaduct on the boundary between West Lothian and Edinburgh in Scotland. The viaduct carries the Glasgow–Edinburgh via Falkirk line across the A89 road and Brox Burn.

The viaduct has 7 stone arches and a length of 127 metres (417 ft) and a height of 16.8 metres (55 ft). It was completed in 1842 and designated a category A listed building in 1971.

The Almond Valley Viaduct is nearby, located east of the Broxburn Viaduct. It is much longer, having 36 arches, but is sometimes also referred to as the "Broxburn Viaduct", and they are sometimes referred to as the same structure.

== See also ==
- List of railway bridges and viaducts in the United Kingdom
