= Scheduled monuments in West Lothian =

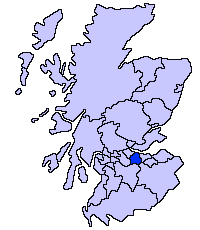
West Lothian shown within Scotland

A scheduled monument in Scotland is a nationally important archaeological site or monument which is given legal protection by being placed on a list (or "schedule") maintained by Historic Environment Scotland. The aim of scheduling is to preserve the country's most significant sites and monuments as far as possible in the form in which they have been inherited.

The process of scheduling is governed by the Ancient Monuments and Archaeological Areas Act 1979, which aims "to make provision for the investigation, preservation and recording of matters of archaeological or historical interest". The term "scheduled monument" can apply to the whole range of archaeological sites which have been deliberately constructed by human activity but are not always visible above ground. They range from prehistoric standing stones and burial sites, through Roman remains and medieval structures such as castles and monasteries, to later structures such as industrial sites and buildings constructed for the World Wars. Some buildings or structures which were both scheduled and listed have had their listing designations removed to reduce the duplication.

As of 2017 there were 8,238 scheduled monuments in Scotland.

== Notable scheduled monuments in West Lothian ==
Name	Location	Description	Ref No	Image
Abercorn Castle	Abercorn	Remains of castle	SM7869	
Cairns Castle	Mid Calder	Remains of 15th-century rectangular tower-house	SM1193	
Duntarvie Castle	Abercorn	16th-century oblong 3-storey block with square 4-storey towers	SM1905	
Almondell Aqueduct	Mid Calder	Cast-iron trough aqueduct of 25m span	SM4242	
Abercorn Church carved stones	Abercorn	Carved gravestones in Session House	SM7545	
Linlithgow Palace, Peel and Royal park.	Linlithgow	Linlithgow Palace and the Royal Park, including Linlithgow Loch, the ground beneath St Michael's Church and the church burial ground.	SM13099	
Cairnpapple Hill	Torphichen	Prehistoric ceremonial complex on summit	SM90053	
Torphichen Preceptory	Torphichen	Remains of 12th-century preceptory	SM90305	

== See also ==
- List of Category A listed buildings in West Lothian
