= List of listed buildings in Torphichen, West Lothian =

Torphichen parish shown within West Lothian

This is a list of listed buildings in the parish of Torphichen in West Lothian, Scotland.

== List ==
Name	Location	Date Listed	Grid Ref. (Note: Sometimes known as OSGB36, the grid reference (where provided) is based on the British national grid reference system used by the Ordnance Survey. • "Guide to National Grid". Ordnance Survey. • "Get-a-map". Ordnance Survey.)	Geo-coordinates	Notes	LB Number (Note: Historic Environment Scotland assign a unique alphanumeric identifier to each designated site in Scotland, for listed buildings this always begins with "LB", for example "LB12345".)	Image
Torphichen Kirk				55°56′05″N 3°39′07″W	Category B	14533	Upload another image
Church Of Christ (Former Free Church)				55°53′04″N 3°46′30″W	Category C(S)	14552	Upload Photo
Kipps House				55°56′51″N 3°37′18″W	Category C(S)	14547	Upload Photo
Cottages, Broomparkwell				55°55′51″N 3°40′00″W	Category C(S)	14550	Upload Photo
Bridge Castle (Little Brighouse)				55°55′12″N 3°41′31″W	Category B	14551	Upload another image
Wallhouse				55°56′02″N 3°39′53″W	Category B	19704	Upload Photo
Torphichen Preceptory				55°56′05″N 3°39′07″W	Category A	14532	Upload another image
Avon Railway Viaduct Near Westfield				55°56′07″N 3°42′32″W	Category B	14556	Upload Photo
Torphichen Free Church (Now Church Hall)				55°55′57″N 3°39′23″W	Category C(S)	14542	Upload Photo
Gowan Bank Farmhouse, Steading And Cottage				55°55′17″N 3°44′07″W	Category A	14557	Upload Photo
Low Brae, Ivy Cottage				55°55′57″N 3°39′21″W	Category C(S)	18189	Upload Photo
Jubilee Well, The Square				55°56′01″N 3°39′15″W	Category C(S)	14535	Upload another image See more images
'Viewforth' High Brae				55°55′57″N 3°39′17″W	Category B	14540	Upload Photo
'Westcraigs'				55°53′05″N 3°45′43″W	Category B	14553	Upload Photo
Old Bedlormio House				55°53′09″N 3°48′02″W	Category B	14554	Upload Photo
House, The Square, W Side				55°56′00″N 3°39′17″W	Category C(S)	14537	Upload Photo
Hill House, High Brae				55°55′57″N 3°39′16″W	Category C(S)	14539	Upload Photo
Sundial				55°55′56″N 3°39′18″W	Category B	14541	Upload Photo
Doocot Wallhouse Policies				55°56′07″N 3°39′52″W	Category B	14549	Upload Photo
Gate-House Torphichen Kirkyard				55°56′04″N 3°39′11″W	Category B	14534	Upload another image
Cottages, The Square, N. Side				55°56′01″N 3°39′15″W	Category C(S)	14536	Upload Photo
Rose Cottage (Old Smiddy) Off The Square				55°56′02″N 3°39′18″W	Category C(S)	14538	Upload Photo
Bowdenhill Lime-Kilns				55°57′11″N 3°38′18″W	Category B	14555	Upload Photo
Cathlaw House				55°56′00″N 3°37′50″W	Category B	14589	Upload Photo

== Key ==
The scheme for classifying buildings in Scotland is:

- Category A: "buildings of national or international importance, either architectural or historic; or fine, little-altered examples of some particular period, style or building type."
- Category B: "buildings of regional or more than local importance; or major examples of some particular period, style or building type, which may have been altered."
- Category C: "buildings of local importance; lesser examples of any period, style, or building type, as originally constructed or moderately altered; and simple traditional buildings which group well with other listed buildings."

In March 2016 there were 47,288 listed buildings in Scotland. Of these, 8% were Category A, and 50% were Category B, with the remaining 42% being Category C.
