= Ochiltree Castle, West Lothian =

16th-century Scottish tower house

Coordinates: 55°57′13.68″N 3°32′49.31″W

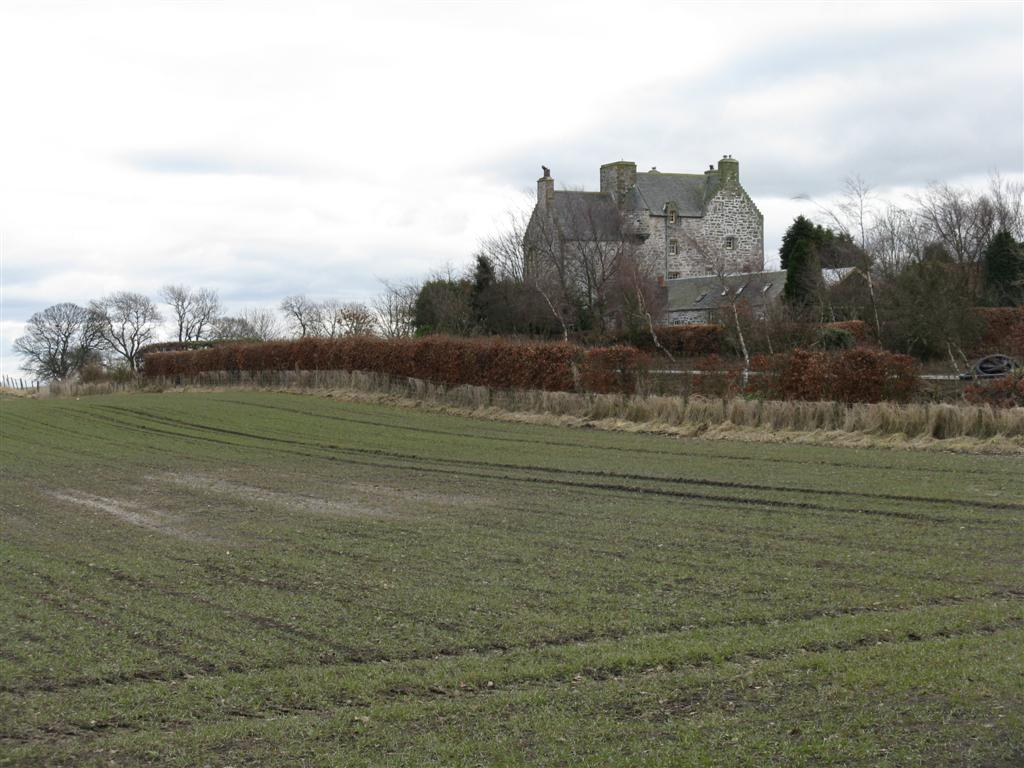
Ochiltree Castle

Ochiltree Castle (previously: Uchiltre; meaning: the high town or high dwelling place) is a 16th-century tower house a few miles south east of Linlithgow in West Lothian, Scotland. It is also described as a farmhouse and lairds house. Along with its boundary wall, the castle was designated as a Category A listed building in 1971.

== History ==
The estate was owned by Sir James Hamilton of Finnart between 1526 after the forfeiture of Stirling of Keir and his beheading for treason in 1540. Its history after that date is unclear, but it may have been owned in the late 16th century by Captain James Stewart of Ochiltree in East Ayrshire who may also have built it. By 1610 it had returned to the Stirlings. At the time of an 1816 survey, the Ochiltree estate was owned by Archibald Primrose, 4th Earl of Rosebery and stretched between two parishes, Linlithgow parish and Ecclesmachan parish.

== Description ==
The castle is a three-storey L-plan building with an attic. It has circular bartizans on the second-storey level in the south east and north west angles. The entrance was originally in the interior angle in the north wall, adjacent to the circular stair turret. About 1610 it was extensively remodelled with a new doorway in the western face that opened on a porch; two finialed pediments over the doorway display the monograms of Sir Archibald Stirling of Keir and his wife Dame Grizel (née Ross) Stirling. A new strait staircase that ran along the western wall was added to connect the ground and first storeys. The northern wing was extended to include a new kitchen on the ground floor and the old kitchen was partitioned. A new west range of two-storey offices was also added, although this was later replaced in the late 19th century with a long single-storey wing, probably incorporating parts of the previous structure in its southern wall, with one block projecting south east.
