= List of listed buildings in Mid Calder, West Lothian =

Mid Calder parish shown within West Lothian

This is a list of listed buildings in the parish of Mid Calder in West Lothian, Scotland.

== List ==
Name	Location	Date Listed	Grid Ref. (Note: Sometimes known as OSGB36, the grid reference (where provided) is based on the British national grid reference system used by the Ordnance Survey. • "Guide to National Grid". Ordnance Survey. • "Get-a-map". Ordnance Survey.)	Geo-coordinates	Notes	LB Number (Note: Historic Environment Scotland assign a unique alphanumeric identifier to each designated site in Scotland, for listed buildings this always begins with "LB", for example "LB12345".)	Image
68 Main Street				55°53′27″N 3°28′56″W	Category C(S)	14146	Upload Photo
Calder House				55°53′22″N 3°29′04″W	Category A	14153	Upload another image See more images
Wester Causewayend Farmhouse And Steading				55°49′58″N 3°27′55″W	Category B	18980	Upload Photo
Westfield House				55°51′31″N 3°31′40″W	Category B	18442	Upload Photo
Alderston House, With Offices				55°52′49″N 3°31′48″W	Category B	18443	Upload Photo
Murieston House, Easter Murieston				55°51′57″N 3°30′24″W	Category B	14134	Upload Photo
Black Bull Inn 6-4A-4 Market Street				55°53′33″N 3°28′52″W	Category C(S)	14136	Upload another image See more images
23-25 Bank Street				55°53′34″N 3°28′49″W	Category C(S)	14141	Upload Photo
41, 43, 47 Bank Street				55°53′34″N 3°28′46″W	Category B	14149	Upload Photo
Torphichen Arms Hotel, Bank Street				55°53′33″N 3°28′47″W	Category B	14150	Upload another image
Howden Bridge				55°53′19″N 3°30′13″W	Category B	14163	Upload another image See more images
Williamston Bridge				55°52′31″N 3°29′42″W	Category C(S)	14164	Upload Photo
Bridge, Murieston House				55°51′57″N 3°30′21″W	Category B	18833	Upload Photo
Alderston Park, Doocot				55°52′50″N 3°31′46″W	Category B	18444	Upload Photo
Newpark House				55°52′00″N 3°31′19″W	Category C(S)	14143	Upload Photo
Midcalder Village Mid Calder Parish Kirk (St. John's Church) Main Street				55°53′24″N 3°28′57″W	Category A	14144	Upload Photo
Calder Steading				55°53′16″N 3°29′19″W	Category B	14154	Upload Photo
Gateway, Calder Estate, West Calder Road				55°53′20″N 3°28′54″W	Category A	14155	Upload another image
Oak Cafe 11 Bank Street				55°53′33″N 3°28′51″W	Category C(S)	14138	Upload Photo
Brewery House, 70 Main Street				55°53′26″N 3°28′56″W	Category B	14145	Upload Photo
Livingston Bridge, River Almond				55°53′05″N 3°32′21″W	Category B	14161	Upload Photo
Cairns Castle, Easter Cairns, By Harperrig Reservoir				55°49′45″N 3°27′13″W	Category B	47559	Upload Photo
Skivo Farm (Skivo Kennels)				55°51′26″N 3°30′51″W	Category C(S)	14135	Upload Photo
37-39 Bank Street				55°53′35″N 3°28′47″W	Category C(S)	14142	Upload Photo
35 Bank Street				55°53′35″N 3°28′48″W	Category C(S)	14148	Upload Photo
East Bridge, Linhouse Water, East Calder Road				55°53′34″N 3°28′41″W	Category B	14151	Upload Photo
Howden House				55°53′34″N 3°31′02″W	Category B	14162	Upload Photo
Bellsquarry, 30 Calder Road With Boundary Walls				55°52′10″N 3°31′37″W	Category C(S)	44584	Upload Photo
19-21-21A Bank Street				55°53′34″N 3°28′49″W	Category C(S)	19670	Upload Photo
2 Market Street				55°53′33″N 3°28′51″W	Category C(S)	14137	Upload Photo
The Old Schoolhouse Causewayend Kirknewton				55°50′03″N 3°27′30″W	Category B	14158	Upload Photo
House, Pumpherston Road				55°53′36″N 3°28′40″W	Category B	19671	Upload Photo
15 (Formerly 13-15) Bank Street				55°53′33″N 3°28′50″W	Category C(S)	14139	Upload Photo
Clydesdale Bank 17 Bank Street				55°53′33″N 3°28′50″W	Category C(S)	14140	Upload Photo
29 Bank Street				55°53′34″N 3°28′48″W	Category B	14147	Upload Photo
Linhouse Mansion				55°51′03″N 3°29′57″W	Category A	14156	Upload another image
Doocot, Linhouse				55°51′07″N 3°30′05″W	Category B	14157	Upload Photo
Stables, The Old Schoolhouse, Causewayend Kirknewton				55°50′04″N 3°27′31″W	Category B	14159	Upload Photo
Brucefield Farmhouse And Steading				55°51′59″N 3°32′07″W	Category B	14160	Upload Photo
Bankton House				55°52′28″N 3°30′04″W	Category B	19672	Upload Photo
Wester Murieston, Murieston Castle				55°51′19″N 3°31′08″W	Category B	18441	Upload Photo
Gate-Lodge And Gate-Way, Calder Estate, Bank Street				55°53′32″N 3°28′50″W	Category C(S)	14152	Upload Photo

== Key ==
The scheme for classifying buildings in Scotland is:

- Category A: "buildings of national or international importance, either architectural or historic; or fine, little-altered examples of some particular period, style or building type."
- Category B: "buildings of regional or more than local importance; or major examples of some particular period, style or building type, which may have been altered."
- Category C: "buildings of local importance; lesser examples of any period, style, or building type, as originally constructed or moderately altered; and simple traditional buildings which group well with other listed buildings."

In March 2016 there were 47,288 listed buildings in Scotland. Of these, 8% were Category A, and 50% were Category B, with the remaining 42% being Category C.
