= List of listed buildings in Kirkliston, West Lothian =

Kirkliston parish shown within West Lothian

This is a list of listed buildings in the parish of Kirkliston in West Lothian, Scotland.

== List ==
Name	Location	Date Listed	Grid Ref. (Note: Sometimes known as OSGB36, the grid reference (where provided) is based on the British national grid reference system used by the Ordnance Survey. • "Guide to National Grid". Ordnance Survey. • "Get-a-map". Ordnance Survey.)	Geo-coordinates	Notes	LB Number (Note: Historic Environment Scotland assign a unique alphanumeric identifier to each designated site in Scotland, for listed buildings this always begins with "LB", for example "LB12345".)	Image
Union Canal Bridge 31, Near Bell's Mill				55°57′19″N 3°27′41″W	Category C(S)	7423	Upload Photo
Union Canal Bridge 20, Near Muirend				55°55′25″N 3°26′43″W	Category C(S)	7432	Upload another image
Union Canal Bridge 19, Near Lin's Mill				55°55′23″N 3°26′23″W	Category C(S)	7431	Upload another image
Union Canal Bridge 21, Near Lookaboutye				55°55′27″N 3°27′14″W	Category C(S)	7433	Upload Photo
Kilpunt Doocot				55°55′52″N 3°26′42″W	Category C(S)	7435	Upload Photo
Illieston House (Elliston)				55°54′52″N 3°26′24″W	Category B	7436	Upload another image
Union Canal Bridge 32, Main Road At Winchburgh				55°57′36″N 3°27′51″W	Category C(S)	7424	Upload another image See more images
Railway Viaduct, River Avon, Near Birds Mill				55°55′35″N 3°25′44″W	Category B	7429	Upload Photo
Winchburgh, Main Street, Former Winchburgh Primary Schools Including Boundary Walls And Outbuildings				55°57′35″N 3°27′21″W	Category C(S)	49194	Upload Photo
Old Auldcathie Kirk				55°58′06″N 3°28′40″W	Category C(S)	13649	Upload Photo
Railway Viaduct, Almond Valley				55°56′04″N 3°25′21″W	Category A	7428	Upload another image See more images
Union Canal Bridge 33, Near Myre				55°57′53″N 3°27′52″W	Category C(S)	7425	Upload Photo
Union Canal Bridge 34, Near Auldcathie Kirk				55°58′09″N 3°28′27″W	Category C(S)	7426	Upload another image
Railway Viaduct, Broxburn-Newbridge Road				55°56′15″N 3°25′59″W	Category A	7427	Upload another image See more images
Union Canal, Almond Aqueduct, River Avon Near Linn's Mill				55°55′13″N 3°26′02″W	Category A	7430	Upload another image
Union Canal Bridge 30, Near Broomhouse				55°57′05″N 3°27′10″W	Category C(S)	7438	Upload another image See more images
Union Canal Bridge 22, At Learielaw				55°55′31″N 3°27′35″W	Category C(S)	7434	Upload Photo
Niddry Castle				55°57′14″N 3°27′02″W	Category A	7437	Upload another image See more images

== Key ==
The scheme for classifying buildings in Scotland is:

- Category A: "buildings of national or international importance, either architectural or historic; or fine, little-altered examples of some particular period, style or building type."
- Category B: "buildings of regional or more than local importance; or major examples of some particular period, style or building type, which may have been altered."
- Category C: "buildings of local importance; lesser examples of any period, style, or building type, as originally constructed or moderately altered; and simple traditional buildings which group well with other listed buildings."

In March 2016 there were 47,288 listed buildings in Scotland. Of these, 8% were Category A, and 50% were Category B, with the remaining 42% being Category C.
