= Seafield, West Lothian =

Coordinates: 55.877°N 3.589°W

Seafield
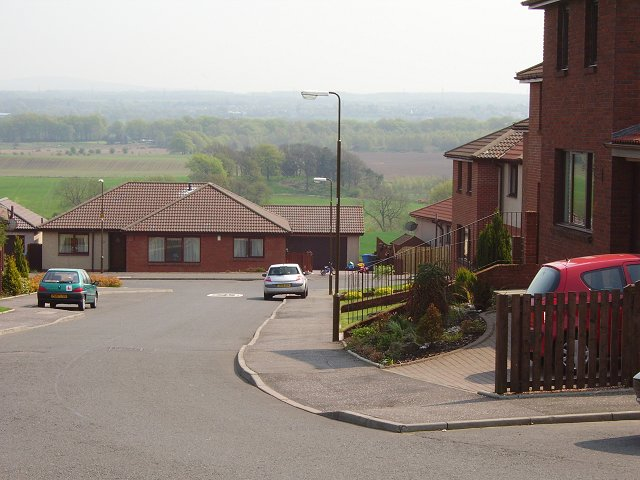
- New housing in Seafield overlooks the Almond

- Location within West Lothian
- Population: 1,350 (2020)
- OS grid reference: NT007660
- Council area: West Lothian
- Lieutenancy area: West Lothian
- Country: Scotland
- Sovereign state: United Kingdom
- Post town: BATHGATE
- Postcode district: EH47
- Dialling code: 01506
- Police: Scotland
- Fire: Scottish
- Ambulance: Scottish
- UK Parliament: Livingston
- Scottish Parliament: Almond Valley

Seafield is a small village in West Lothian, Scotland. Seafield lies 1 1/4 miles (2.0 km) east of Blackburn, 2 miles (3.2 km) southeast of Bathgate (grid reference NT007660) and 3 miles (4.8 km) west of Livingston.

== Geography ==
The village lies between the River Almond to the south and the M8 motorway to the north. The nearby Seafield Law is 198 metres.

== History ==
Seafield grew initially in the 1870s to 1900s to provide housing for coal and oil-shale mine workers, with three poorer-quality rows north of the road demolished but two later, well-built terraces of miners' rows on the south side now restored in the centre of the village. In the 1970s, new housing was laid out with Scandinavian style houses that have alternating mono-pitched roofs and slender chimneys.

The oil-shale works north of the village were cleared by the 1960s, leaving a large oil-shale bing (tip). The County Council then used the works site and the adjacent peat moss as its main domestic refuse tip until the 1980s. This generated serious water pollution problems, aggravated by outflow being east towards the New Town of Livingston. One of the last large-scale Scottish Enterprise-led land reclamation schemes, in the 1990s, utilised the spent shale (which is inert, having been retorted at high temperature) to blind over the tip, with full pollution control measures.

Seafield Bing itself was remodelled to a design brief by West Lothian Planners, to resemble the natural basalt sills and lava flow landscapes of the Bathgate Hills and Fife, with a serrated crestline, and a proper summit now estimated at 198m asl in height, and renamed with approval of the Community Council "Seafield Law". Together with Easter Inch MosS, Seafield Law has a wooded setting that is designated as a 148 hectare local nature reserve and recreational area.

== Notable buildings ==
Situated just outside Seafield is Blackburn House. This is an A-listed building built in 1772 by George Moncrieff.

== Community facilities ==
Seafield has several community amenities including a primary school, shop, community centre, bowling club and annual Gala day. The community centre is based in the old primary school building of the village, a gift from a private benefactor.

Notably, Seafield was the birthplace of the now-defunct Seafield & District Pipe Band, which for many years focused on teaching children and teenagers to play the pipes and drums. The band was associated with successful solo bagpiper Chris Armstrong, who served as a piping tutor for the band and then as its Pipe Major in 1998;
