= Almondell Viaduct =

Viaduct in West Lothian, Scotland

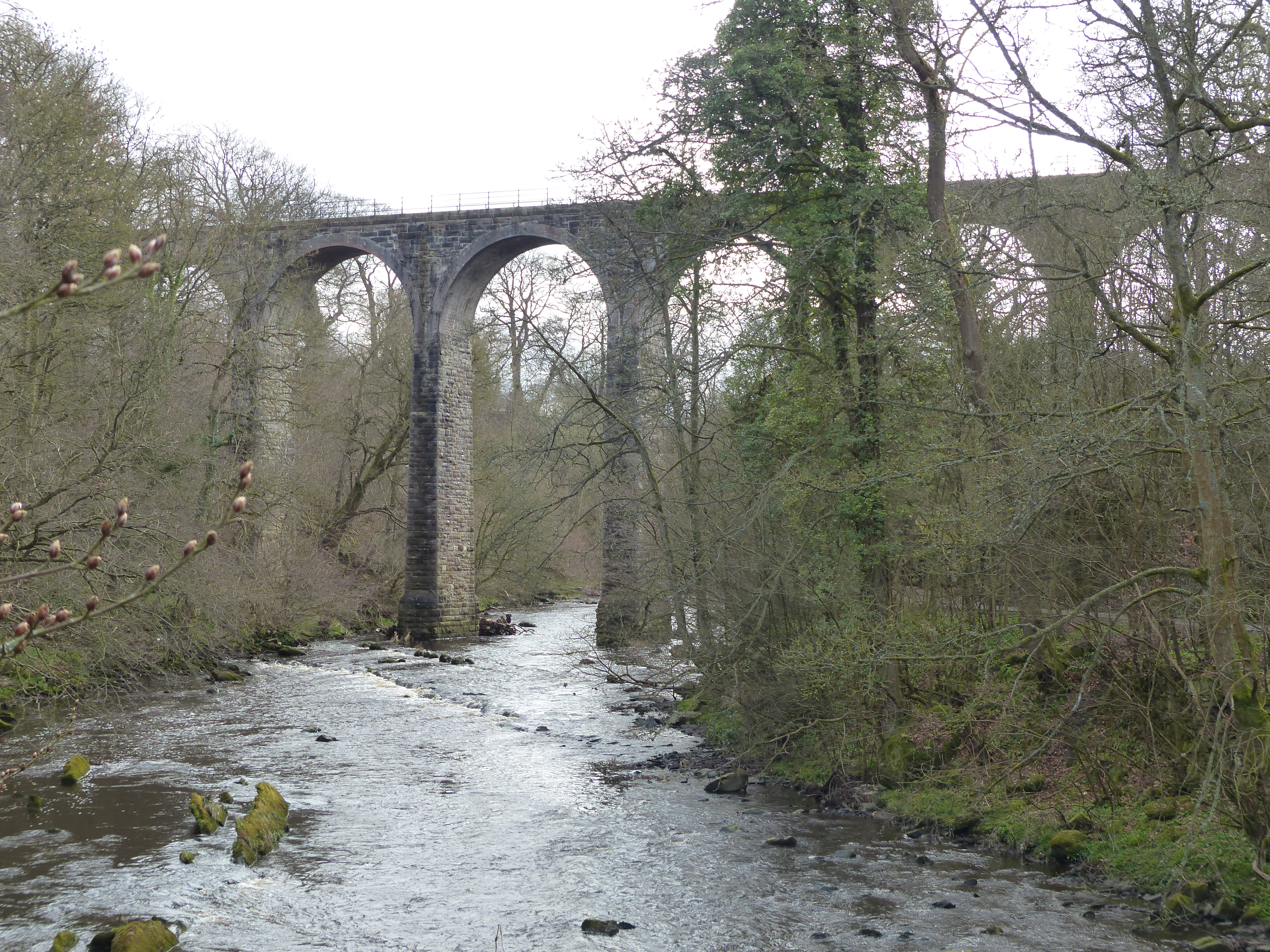
- Camps Viaduct from the north
- Coordinates: 55.9001°N 3.463°W
- Carries: WL17
- Crosses: River Almond; Almond Feeder
- Locale: West Lothian
- Other name: Camps Vaiduct

Characteristics
- Total length: 108 metres (354 ft)
- Height: 27 metres (89 ft)

History
- Designer: J. & A. GRANGER, Esqs, Railway Contractors
- Construction start: 1865-66
- Construction end: 1867
- Rebuilt: 1885
- Closed: 1959

Listed Building – Category B
- Official name: Mineral Railway Viaduct, River Almond
- Designated: 21 January 1971
- Reference no.: LB7372

Location
- Interactive map of Almondell Viaduct

The Almondell Viaduct, also known as the Camps Viaduct, is a viaduct spanning the gorge of the River Almond in East Calder, West Lothian, Scotland. It also crosses the Almond Feeder which takes water from the River Almond to supply the Union Canal at Lin's Mill near Ratho.

The viaduct is built on nine high segmental brick arches atop rock-faced snecked rubble piers, and features rounded cut-waters in the river below.

== History ==
This famous local landmark was built circa 1865-66 by J. & A. GRANGER, Esqs, Railway Contractors. It opened to rail traffic in 1867, and remained in operation until 1959 as a single track Mineral Railway bridge on the Camps Branch of the North British Railway. Its purpose was to supply the now-closed Coltness Iron Works with limestone from the Raw Camps and East Camps Quarries in East Calder, where extensive quarries, brickworks and limekilns were once located. It also supplied James "Paraffin" Young's Paraffin Light & Mineral Oil Company at Pumpherston with Oil Shale for processing into Paraffin.

On 13 February 1880, the viaduct was the site of a significant railway accident when an axle broke on one of the rear wagons, derailing two wagons and the guard's van, which fell off the viaduct into the River below, tragically killing two guards and a telegraph boy.

Due to the resulting damage to the structure, the viaduct underwent significant repairs and was possibly even rebuilt. Perhaps for this reason, many secondary sources appear to report the year of construction as 1885, whereas this was most likely the year in which it reopened.

The viaduct closed permanently to railway traffic in 1959, and all the rail tracks as well as adjoining Goods Sheds were subsequently removed.

The structure was Category B listed in 1971.

It now lies within the Almondell and Calderwood Country Park, providing a convenient and scenic footpath and cycle path over the Almond gorge, while connecting the villages of East Calder, Pumpherston and Uphall Station.

== See also ==
- List of listed buildings in Kirknewton, West Lothian
- List of railway bridges and viaducts in the United Kingdom
