= List of listed buildings in West Calder, West Lothian =

West Calder parish shown within West Lothian

This is a list of listed buildings in the parish of West Calder in West Lothian, Scotland.

== List ==
Name	Location	Date Listed	Grid Ref. (Note: Sometimes known as OSGB36, the grid reference (where provided) is based on the British national grid reference system used by the Ordnance Survey. • "Guide to National Grid". Ordnance Survey. • "Get-a-map". Ordnance Survey.)	Geo-coordinates	Notes	LB Number (Note: Historic Environment Scotland assign a unique alphanumeric identifier to each designated site in Scotland, for listed buildings this always begins with "LB", for example "LB12345".)	Image
Harburn Doocot				55°49′58″N 3°31′33″W	Category B	14218	Upload Photo
West Calder Station, Including Cast-Iron Footbridge To E				55°51′13″N 3°34′01″W	Category B	19677	Upload Photo
Addiewell Farm				55°50′46″N 3°36′47″W	Category C(S)	14225	Upload Photo
West Calder 13-19 (Odd Nos) Main Street, Former West Calder Co-Op				55°51′05″N 3°34′20″W	Category B	14210	Upload Photo
Hartwood House				55°50′07″N 3°34′10″W	Category C(S)	14214	Upload Photo
Harburn Stables				55°49′58″N 3°31′39″W	Category B	14217	Upload Photo
Loganlea House				55°50′25″N 3°37′33″W	Category B	14209	Upload Photo
Limefield House				55°51′45″N 3°32′39″W	Category B	14221	Upload Photo
Old West Calder Kirk				55°51′04″N 3°34′14″W	Category B	14212	Upload Photo
West Calder East End, Library				55°51′08″N 3°34′05″W	Category B	14211	Upload Photo
Harburn House (Hayfield)				55°49′50″N 3°31′36″W	Category B	14215	Upload Photo
Charles X Monument, Harburn Policies				55°49′51″N 3°31′29″W	Category B	14216	Upload Photo
Hermand Coach-House And Stables				55°51′07″N 3°33′15″W	Category B	14220	Upload Photo
Bridge I, Near Limefield House				55°51′41″N 3°32′48″W	Category C(S)	14222	Upload Photo
Gavieside Farm-House				55°52′22″N 3°33′27″W	Category B	14224	Upload Photo
Harwood Farm-House				55°50′29″N 3°34′33″W	Category B	14213	Upload Photo
Hermand House				55°51′12″N 3°33′15″W	Category B	14219	Upload Photo
Bridge 2, Limefield Glen				55°51′48″N 3°32′39″W	Category C(S)	14223	Upload Photo
43 Main Street, Railway Inn				55°51′04″N 3°34′23″W	Category C(S)	51118	Upload Photo

== Key ==
The scheme for classifying buildings in Scotland is:

- Category A: "buildings of national or international importance, either architectural or historic; or fine, little-altered examples of some particular period, style or building type."
- Category B: "buildings of regional or more than local importance; or major examples of some particular period, style or building type, which may have been altered."
- Category C: "buildings of local importance; lesser examples of any period, style, or building type, as originally constructed or moderately altered; and simple traditional buildings which group well with other listed buildings."

In March 2016 there were 47,288 listed buildings in Scotland. Of these, 8% were Category A, and 50% were Category B, with the remaining 42% being Category C.
