= List of listed buildings in Livingston, West Lothian =

Livingston parish shown within West Lothian

This is a list of listed buildings in the parish of Livingston in West Lothian, Scotland.

== List ==
Name	Location	Date listed	Grid ref. (Note: Sometimes known as OSGB36, the grid reference (where provided) is based on the British national grid reference system used by the Ordnance Survey. • "Guide to National Grid". Ordnance Survey. • "Get-a-map". Ordnance Survey.)	Geo-coordinates	Notes	LB number (Note: Historic Environment Scotland assign a unique alphanumeric identifier to each designated site in Scotland, for listed buildings this always begins with "LB", for example "LB12345".)	Image
Auchenhard Tower				55°51′01″N 3°36′24″W	Category B	13648	Upload Photo
Blackburn Village Bridge, River Almond				55°52′14″N 3°37′25″W	Category B	7420	Upload Photo
Livingston Mill Farm				55°53′06″N 3°32′52″W	Category B	7421	Upload Photo
Bloom Cottage No 1; The Shop; Livingston Inn Cottages Nos 1 And 2, 4, 4B; 6 And 8 Main Street				55°53′09″N 3°32′21″W	Category C(S)	7422	Upload Photo
Auchenhard House Including Summerhouse And Gatepiers				55°51′05″N 3°36′19″W	Category B	49089	Upload Photo
Livingston Village, Livingston Parish Kirk				55°53′08″N 3°32′27″W	Category B	7409	Upload another image See more images
Bloom Cottage 3 And 5 Main Street				55°53′08″N 3°32′23″W	Category C(S)	7412	Upload Photo
Moss Houses				55°54′29″N 3°31′26″W	Category B	7417	Upload Photo
Livingston Inn				55°53′08″N 3°32′23″W	Category B	7413	Upload another image See more images
Livingston Bridge, River Almond				55°53′05″N 3°32′21″W	Category B	7414	Upload Photo
Old Toll-House, Long Livingston				55°53′13″N 3°33′32″W	Category B	7415	Upload Photo
Morven And Adjoining Heather Cottage 19 And 21 Main Street				55°53′08″N 3°32′19″W	Category C(S)	7405	Upload Photo
5 Houses. Known As The Old School House And The Danders, 1 Main Street				55°53′08″N 3°32′23″W	Category C(S)	7411	Upload Photo
Newyearfield Farmhouse And Steading				55°53′56″N 3°31′58″W	Category B	7418	Upload Photo
Auchenhard Farmhouse Including Boundary Wall And Gatepiers				55°51′06″N 3°36′20″W	Category B	49185	Upload Photo
Livingston Manse				55°53′07″N 3°32′26″W	Category B	7410	Upload Photo
Knightsridge House				55°54′47″N 3°32′05″W	Category B	7416	Upload Photo
Blackburn House				55°52′24″N 3°35′54″W	Category A	7419	Upload another image See more images
"Bezu" 11 Main Street				55°53′08″N 3°32′20″W	Category C(S)	7407	Upload Photo
Alderston Cottage Or Bloom Cottage Nos 2, 7 And 9 Main Street				55°53′08″N 3°32′21″W	Category C(S)	7408	Upload Photo
Almond Bank (J H Shields) With Sub Post Office, Main Street				55°53′08″N 3°32′19″W	Category C(S)	7406	Upload Photo

== Key ==
The scheme for classifying buildings in Scotland is:

- Category A: "buildings of national or international importance, either architectural or historic; or fine, little-altered examples of some particular period, style or building type."
- Category B: "buildings of regional or more than local importance; or major examples of some particular period, style or building type, which may have been altered."
- Category C: "buildings of local importance; lesser examples of any period, style, or building type, as originally constructed or moderately altered; and simple traditional buildings which group well with other listed buildings."

In March 2016 there were 47,288 listed buildings in Scotland. Of these, 8% were Category A, and 50% were Category B, with the remaining 42% being Category C.
