= Nasmyth Bridge =

Bridge in West Lothian, Scotland

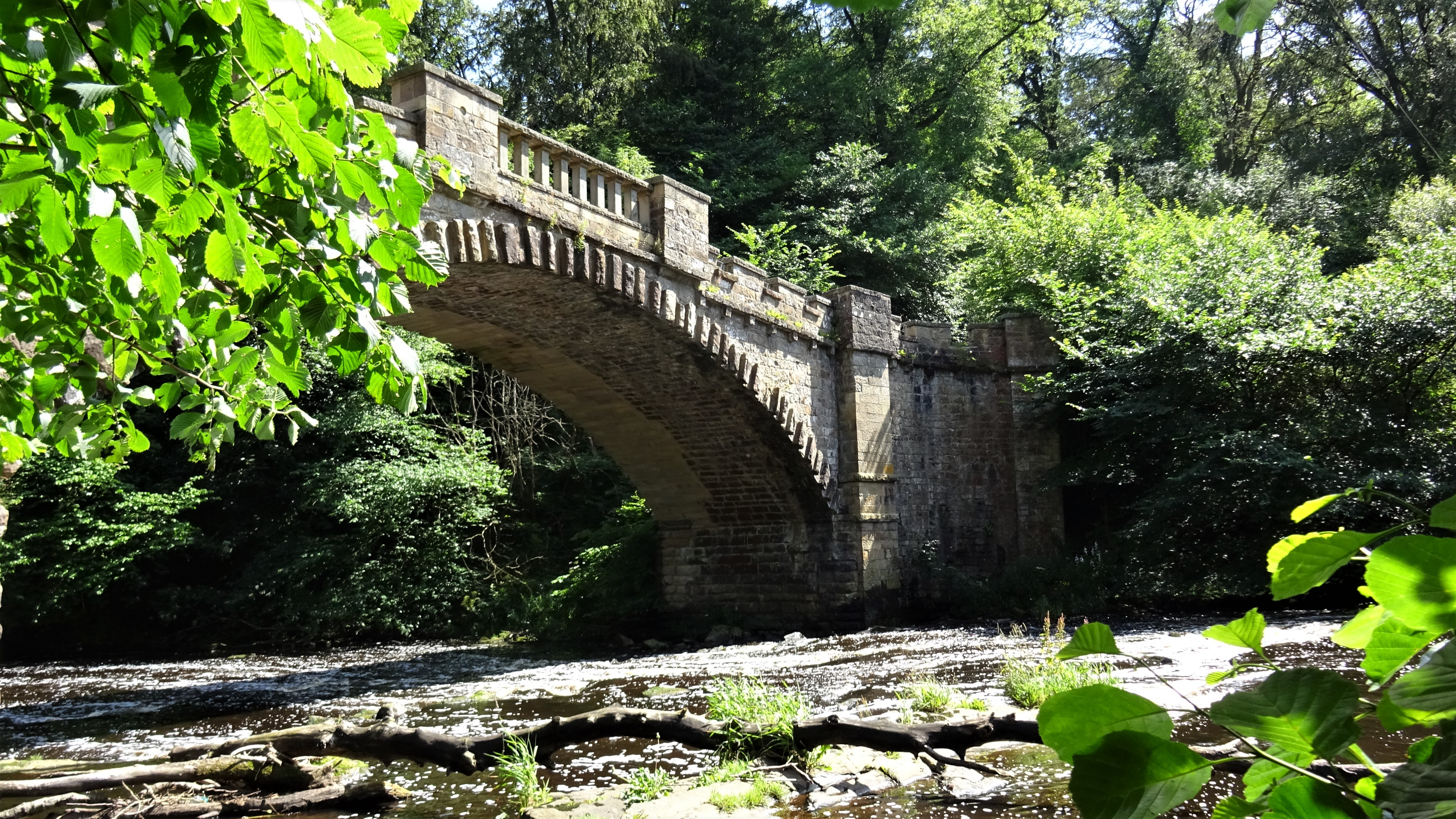
- View facing East, from the left bank of the River Almond
- Coordinates: 55.903611°N 3.459722°W
- Carries: 75
- Crosses: River Almond
- Locale: West Lothian

History
- Construction start: Likely between 1808-10
- Construction end: Before 1811

Listed Building – Category A
- Official name: Almondell Bridge, River Almond
- Designated: 21 January 1971
- Reference no.: LB7370

Location
- Interactive map of Nasmyth Bridge

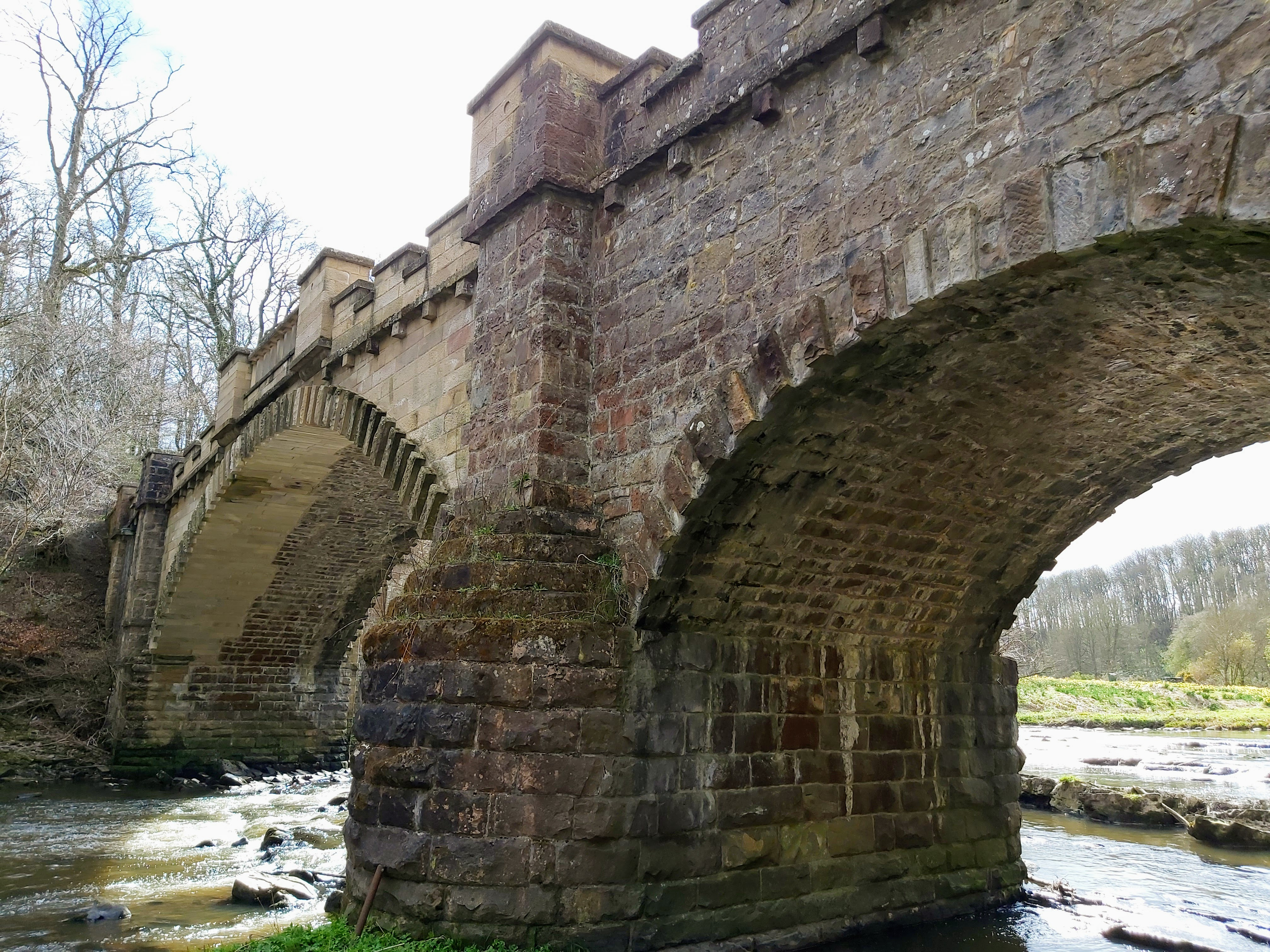
View of the Nasmyth Bridge from the NE

The Nasmyth Bridge (also known as the Almondell Bridge) is a Category A Listed historic bridge and local landmark in East Calder, Scotland.

Located within the Almondell and Calderwood Country Park, it was designed by Scottish painter, architect, and landscape designer Alexander Nasmyth.

== History ==
The bridge was commissioned by Scottish Whig lawyer Henry Erskine to provide a southern approach to his country residence Almondell House, spanning over the River Almond, from the old Edinburgh-Glasgow route as this enters East Calder.

Alexander Nasmyth was commissioned to design the bridge sometime between 1806 and 1810, most likely following the success of a bridge he had designed in 1808 for the Earl of Selkirk on the River Dee, at Tongueland near Kirkcudbright. The Almondell Bridge was completed by 1811, as attested by an oil on canvas painting of the Almondell Bridge by Nasmyth himself, dated from that year, which is its earliest known representation.

Erskine's mansion was built in the 1790s, but fell into disrepair in the 1960s and was finally demolished in 1969; its site is now occupied by the disabled car park adjacent to the Almondell Country Park Visitor Centre.

Nasmyth Bridge was Category A listed in 1971.

Sections of the bridge collapsed into the river in 1973, but the entire structure was restored in 1997 by Ted Ruddock for West Lothian Council, at a cost of £218,000 funded by the Heritage Lottery Fund.

== Architecture ==
The Bridge was built to Nasmyth's own design. Its construction is from local sandstone ashlar, in a style that can be described as ‘romantic Italianate', to match the mansion.

The design comprises two arches of differing spans, one wide segmental arch with a smaller one to the North. This is topped by a castellated parapet, and a central balustrade, and includes 'merlons' (stone seats), coursers, rock-faced voussoirs, and slab coping on square piers in centre.

== See also ==
- List of bridges in Scotland
