= East Calder =

Village in West Lothian, Scotland

Coordinates: 55.896°N 3.462°W

East Calder: Scottish Gaelic: Caladar an Ear; Scots: East Cawder, Easter Cawder
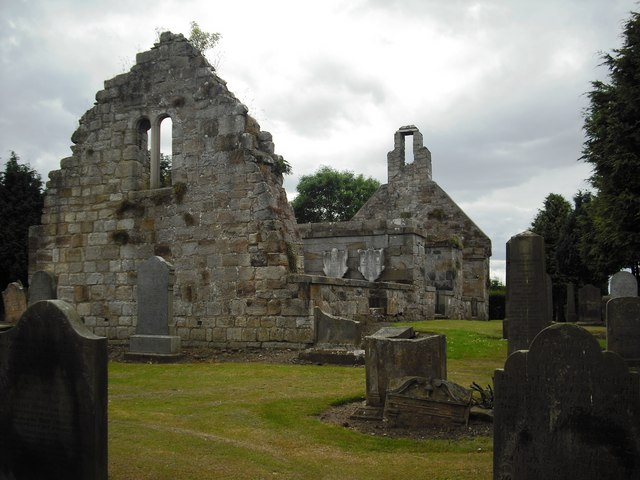
- The remains of St Cuthbert's Kirk, a 16th-century church, abandoned in 1750

- Location within West Lothian
- Population: 6,430 (2020)
- OS grid reference: NT085679
- Civil parish: Kirknewton
- Council area: West Lothian
- Lieutenancy area: West Lothian
- Country: Scotland
- Sovereign state: United Kingdom
- Post town: LIVINGSTON
- Postcode district: EH53
- Dialling code: 01506
- Police: Scotland
- Fire: Scottish
- Ambulance: Scottish
- UK Parliament: Livingston
- Scottish Parliament: Almond Valley

East Calder is a village located in West Lothian, Scotland, about one mile (1.5 kilometres) east of Mid Calder and one mile (1.5 kilometres) west of Wilkieston. It forms part of 'the Calders (together with Mid and West Calder), three small neighbouring communities situated west of Edinburgh and south of the town of Livingston.

Its fast growth rate in the early 21st-century is driven by its being within easy commuting distance of Livingston, Edinburgh and Glasgow, combined with its close position relative to the principal transport arteries of the M8 motorway, the A89 and A71 roads, the Edinburgh – Glasgow railway line (the Shotts Line), and Edinburgh Airport.

The East Calder Gala is a local highlight held every June, dating back to 1919.

== Geography ==
East Calder lies in the lee of the Pentland Hills within the Almond River Valley, near the right bank of the river, and specifically in the East Calder / Livingston / Broxburn Plain, a Lowland Plains type landscape.

Given its location on top of a natural water table running north from the foothills of the Pentlands into the Almond Valley, the name 'Calder' (derived from two Celtic words meaning "the well-watered woods") is an apt description describing the Almondell and Calderwood Country Park, an attractive natural feature of the area.

The area is generally rural in nature, dominated by flat, open arable fields and scattered farms, amongst a variety of urban-fringe land uses. It is divided by the steep-sided and well-vegetated River Almond corridor which runs through it. Remnants from the oil shale industry can also be found dotted around the landscape, such as remaining bings, surviving shale miner's cottages from previous oilworks, and disused mineral rail lines.

== History ==
The Calders were originally divided into two baronies (or manors): Calder Clere, where East Calder now stands, which was granted by King Malcolm IV of Scotland to Randulph de Clere around 1160 and was named after him; and the adjoining Calder Comitis (meaning Earl's Calder), where Mid and West Calder are sited, belonging to the Thanes (or Earls) of Fife.

In 1296 Count John de Langton, along with his brother Allan of Berwickshire, swore fealty to King Edward I of England. John was vicar of Calder Clere, and after his submission was appointed Chancellor here for King Edward I. He may have had some say in naming this small estate and it is suggested that the Church at Langton in Berwickshire was dedicated to St Cuthbert, the same as the one in Calder Clere. John de Langton built his mansion and called it "Langton Law".

As a result, in 1306, during the wars of succession, it underwent forfeiture and was granted to James Douglas by Robert The Bruce.

Apart from the Langton estate, the village is further built on three other estates: the largest part being built on the Calderhall Estate, extending south of a line from the bridge between East and Mid Calder, to the East Kirk burn and along Main Street to Park Avenue; a wall and hedge denoted the eastern boundary there. South of this was the Langton Estate. To the west of Park Avenue, the land was part of the Almondell Estate owned by the Earl of Buchan. The land north of Main Street, between the East Kirk burn and the boundary of Almondell Estate, was owned by the Pumpherston or McLaggen Estate.

The settlement then developed as a "linear" Village along an old Edinburgh-Glasgow route, functioning as a staging post for horse-drawn traffic travelling between the principal Scottish cities; the village would at this stage been no more than a hamlet of small cottages spread along what is now known as the Main Street. The route became the A71 road, which ran through the middle of the Village until the early 1980s when the present bypass was built.

A small plaque inserted by the Community Council into the wall adjoining the "Wee Shoppe", which is currently a Tattoo Studio called Inkwell, a small building near the E end of the old Village, commemorates this period by marking the location of an old village well which served these travellers. The village was at one time reputed to have seven such wells.

=== Churches ===
In the old Village graveyard stand the ruins of St Cuthbert's Church, the oldest building in East Calder; this pre-reformation church dated from around 1148 and is dedicated to the saint, who was famed for travelling all over the Lothians by horseback or by foot, preaching the Gospel to persuade the local people to give up their pagan worship and become Christians. The bones of St Cuthbert now rest within Durham Cathedral.

St Cuthbert's was first mentioned by Randolph De Clere, and at this time the village was known as the East Kirk of Calder, basically little more than a Rectory with small houses clinging to the walls of this ancient place of worship.

Monks from Kelso Abbey looked after the Church until the reformation, with its annual tithes being given to the monks

In the walls of the "Wee Shoppe" is inserted an ancient stone displaying cup and sword markings: this is reputed to be burial stone of a Knight Templar, thought to have been used as a corner foundation stone of St Cuthbert's church.

By 1627 a report was sent to the Presbytery stated that the Kirk was in "ruinous" state, and the Church was permanently abandoned in 1751. In this year, the Parish of East Calder was united with the nearby Parish of Kirknewton.

A second Church was built to replace it in 1777 by fund, and this was in 1886 then replaced by the third Church, which is the current Church of Scotland place of worship.

== Notable landmarks ==
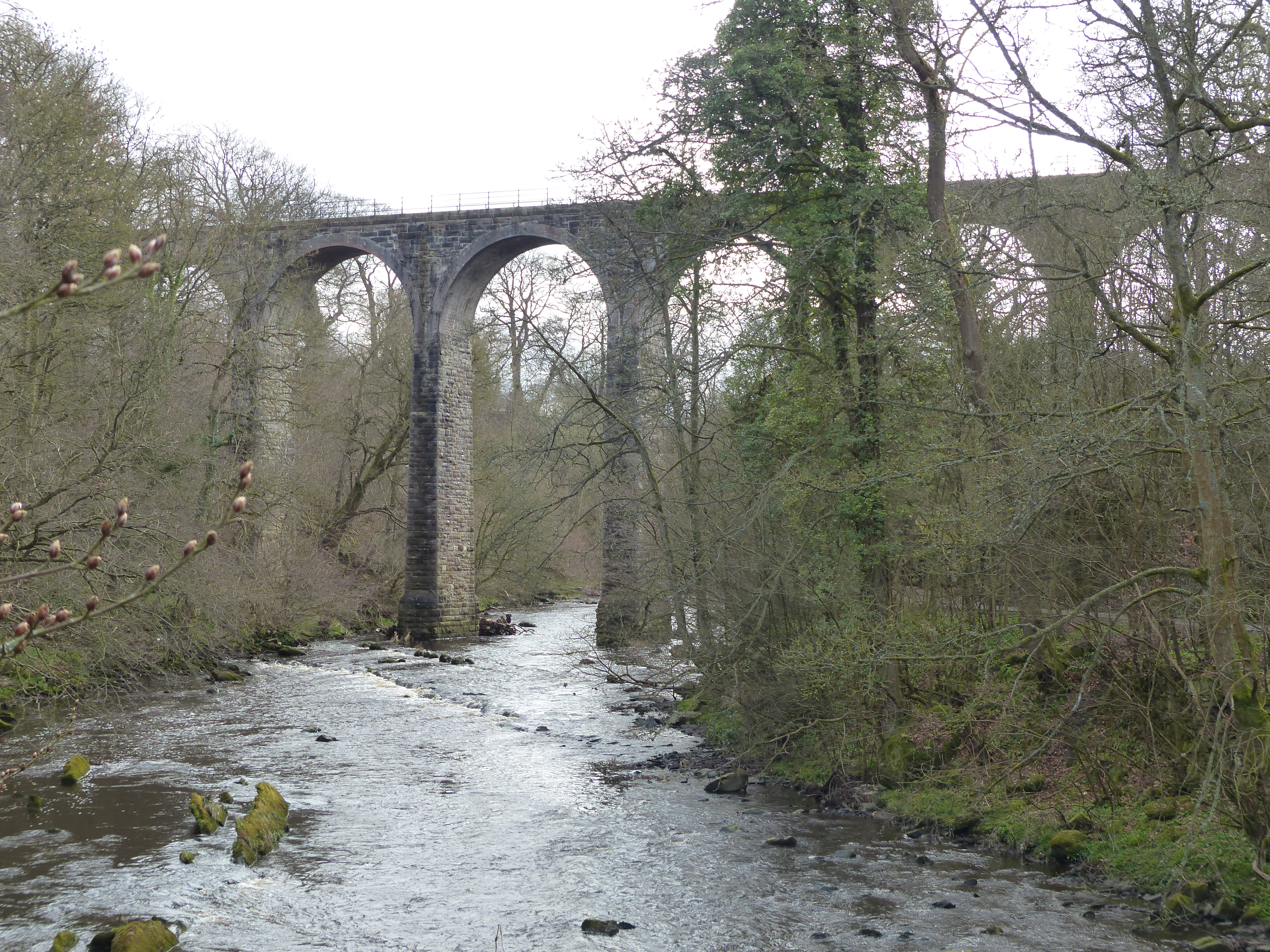
Camps Viaduct from the north

A famous East Calder landmark is the Camps Viaduct, a Category B listed historic railway bridge operating between 1885 and 1959 on the Camps Branch of the North British Railway: this impressive nine arch stone single track viaduct spans over the gorge of the River Almond, and is 108 metres (354 ft) long overall and over 27 metres (89 ft) high. In its time it served James "Paraffin" Young's Paraffin Light & Mineral Oil Company at Pumpherston.

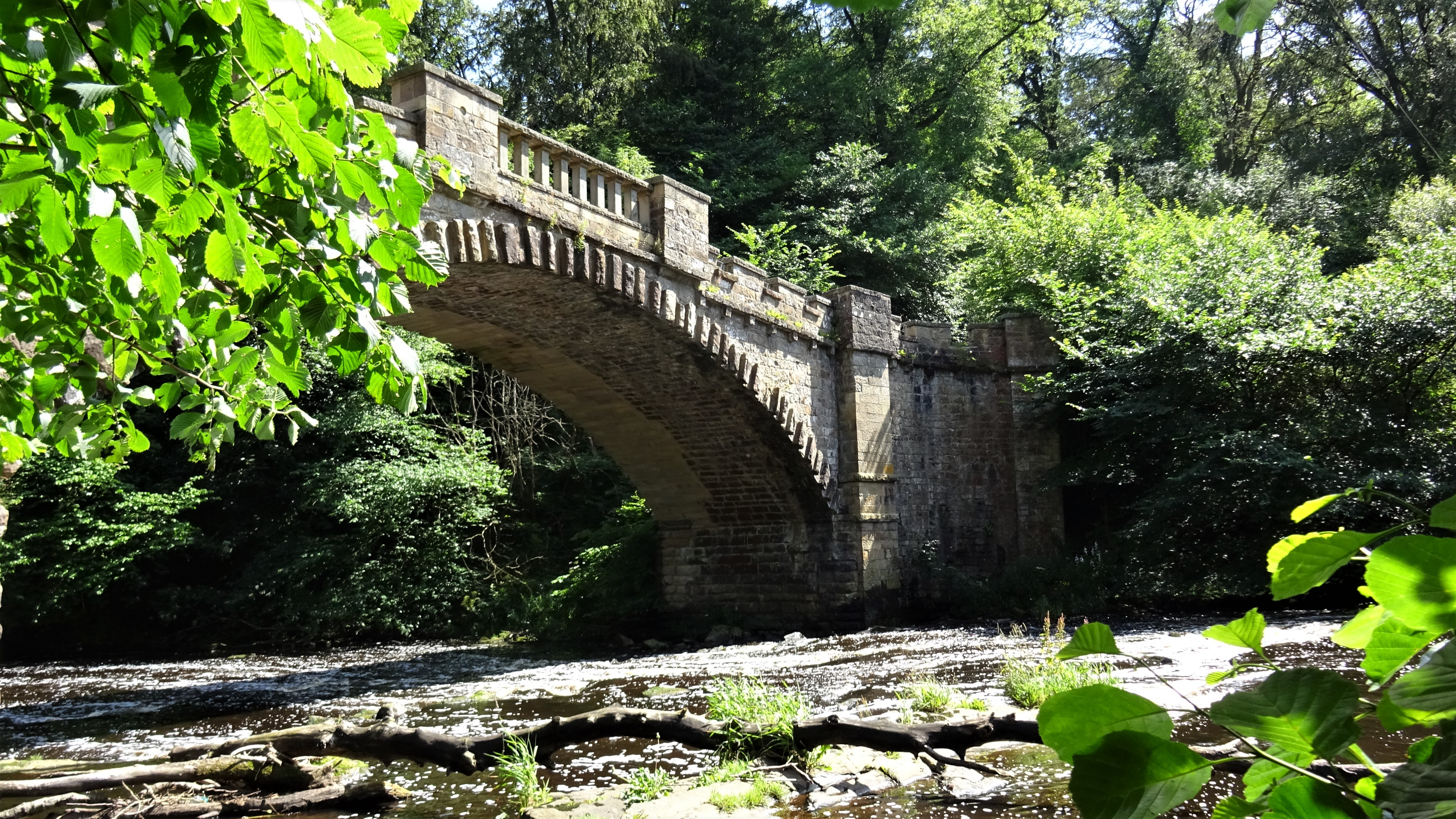
Nasmyth Bridge from the left bank of the River Almond

The Nasmyth Bridge (also known as the Almondell Bridge) is a Category A Listed historic bridge dating from 1806. It is also located within the Almondell and Calderwood Country Park, and was designed by Scottish painter, architect, and landscape designer Alexander Nasmyth.

On the outskirts of the Village, toward Ratho, is the Lin's Mill Aqueduct (also known as the Almond Aqueduct) which carries the Union Canal over the River Almond. This five-arched bridge built in 1821, is 130 metres (430 ft) long and 23 metres (75 ft) above the Almond Valley, and was firmly established in the local history books by the London Gazette when it recounted the massive 126 ft icicle which formed on the bridge centre span during the severe winter of 1895, and again in 1920; this is anecdotally the largest icicle ever recorded in the UK.

Another local landmark is the ‘Grapes Inn’ village pub, the site of which was originally occupied by a much older Inn called the "Olde Wines".

Other visible historical remains include lime quarries and kilns, operating from approximately 1780 to 1913, 18th & 19th C improvements on surrounding farming land, and the routes of drove roads from Falkirk and Stirling, across the Pentlands.

=== Oakbank ===
Nearby Oakbank was at one time a busy bustling mining community set up to extract shale for the manufacture of paraffin; little evidence is left of this one time quaint hamlet at the foot of the Oakbank Bing, itself now very much reduced in size due to landscaping.

The significance of the Oak tree stems from the popular belief that many of the small oak trees in the Oakbank area were of French origin dating back to the time of Mary Queen of Scots, who it believed visited the area upon her return from France.

== Local amenities ==
East Calder has an estate agent, two Scotmid stores and a Tesco Express, a post office, Miller's convenience store, a tattoo studio, a bookmaker, a cafe, hair stylists, a nursery, two chip shops, a pizzeria, two Chinese restaurants, a car wash, a library, a doctors' surgery, a dentist, two bowling greens, a doo club, a pharmacy, a garden centre and a sports centre. Camps industrial estate is located on the edge of the town.

=== Schools ===
East Calder has three primary schools, the non-denominational East Calder and Calderwood Primary Schools, and St Paul's RC School which is the local Catholic primary school. The non-denominational schools are in the catchment area for West Calder High School, while St Paul's is in the catchment for St Margaret's Academy.

East Calder PS was founded in 1934 as a Middle School (Junior High). In 2020 it was announced that it would undergo a complete renovation and upgrade project, which was completed in July 2024.

Calderwood PS is a new purpose-built £14.3M Primary School and Early Years Nursery, sited within the Calderwood housing development, approved by West Lothian Council in 2019, with construction commenced 2020. This received its first Pupil intake in October 2021, and had its official opening in March 2022.

=== Transport ===
The A71 which formerly ran through the town now bypasses it to the south. East Calder is served by a number of bus services. The nearest train station is located at Kirknewton.

Lothian Country operate services:

- X27 – Edinburgh – Calderwood – East Calder – Mid Calder – Livingston – Deans North – Bathgate
- X28 – Edinburgh – Kirknewton – East Calder – Mid Calder – Livingston – Deans North – Bathgate
- X40 – Royal Infirmary – Gilmerton – Westside Plaza – Calderwood – East Calder – Mid Calder – Livingston Centre – St. John's Hospital
- N28 – Edinburgh – Kirknewton – East Calder – Mid Calder – Livingston – Deans North – Bathgate (Night Service)

== Notable people ==
- Rev Alexander Bryce and his son Sir Alexander Bryce
- Willie Borland, professional darts player
