= List of listed buildings in Ecclesmachan, West Lothian =

Ecclesmachan parish shown within West Lothian

This is a list of listed buildings in the parish of Ecclesmachan in West Lothian, Scotland.

== List ==
Name	Location	Date Listed	Grid Ref. (Note: Sometimes known as OSGB36, the grid reference (where provided) is based on the British national grid reference system used by the Ordnance Survey. • "Guide to National Grid". Ordnance Survey. • "Get-a-map". Ordnance Survey.)	Geo-coordinates	Notes	LB Number (Note: Historic Environment Scotland assign a unique alphanumeric identifier to each designated site in Scotland, for listed buildings this always begins with "LB", for example "LB12345".)	Image
Bangour Village Hospital Excl Villas 9 23–29 31 & Boiler House				55°55′21″N 3°32′57″W	Category A	6588	Upload another image
Thomson Of Binny Mausoleum, Binny Policies				55°56′36″N 3°31′27″W	Category C(S)	661	Upload Photo
Binny House				55°56′38″N 3°31′07″W	Category B	658	Upload another image
Ecclesmachan Kirk (St. Machan's)				55°56′48″N 3°30′31″W	Category B	656	Upload another image See more images
Twelvemile Lodge Near Wester Auldcathie				55°57′50″N 3°29′35″W	Category B	5096	Upload another image
Binny Doocot At Binny House				55°56′39″N 3°31′07″W	Category B	659	Upload Photo
Middle East Lodge, Binny Policies				55°56′43″N 3°30′51″W	Category B	660	Upload Photo
Smiddy Cottage (Hendersons) Opposite Kirk				55°56′49″N 3°30′34″W	Category C(S)	657	Upload another image
Threemiletown Farmhouse And Steading, Including Boundary Walls And Gatepiers				55°57′56″N 3°30′31″W	Category C(S)	49074	Upload Photo
Craig Binning House				55°55′46″N 3°32′47″W	Category C(S)	5095	Upload Photo

== Key ==
The scheme for classifying buildings in Scotland is:

- Category A: "buildings of national or international importance, either architectural or historic; or fine, little-altered examples of some particular period, style or building type."
- Category B: "buildings of regional or more than local importance; or major examples of some particular period, style or building type, which may have been altered."
- Category C: "buildings of local importance; lesser examples of any period, style, or building type, as originally constructed or moderately altered; and simple traditional buildings which group well with other listed buildings."

In March 2016 there were 47,288 listed buildings in Scotland. Of these, 8% were Category A, and 50% were Category B, with the remaining 42% being Category C.
