= Almondell and Calderwood Country Park =

Country park in West Lothian, Scotland

Coordinates: 55.901°N 3.460°W

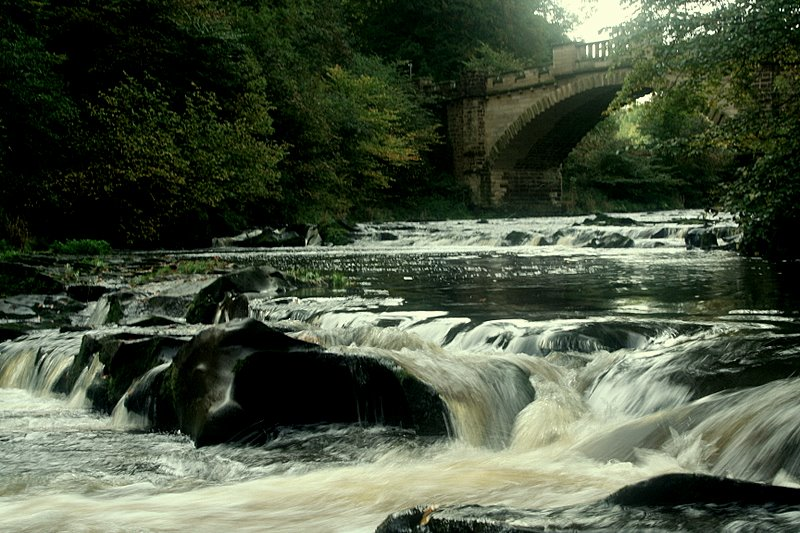
River Almond and Naismith Bridge

Almondell and Calderwood Country Park is a 220-acre (0.89 km^{2}) Country Park in Mid Calder and East Calder in West Lothian, Scotland. It is a 4 star Visitor Attraction (Visitscotland). The Park is split into two main areas, Almondell Park which comprises the Almondell estate which originally belonged to the Erskine family of Broxburn and the Calderwood estate which once belonged to the Barons of Torphichen.

== History ==
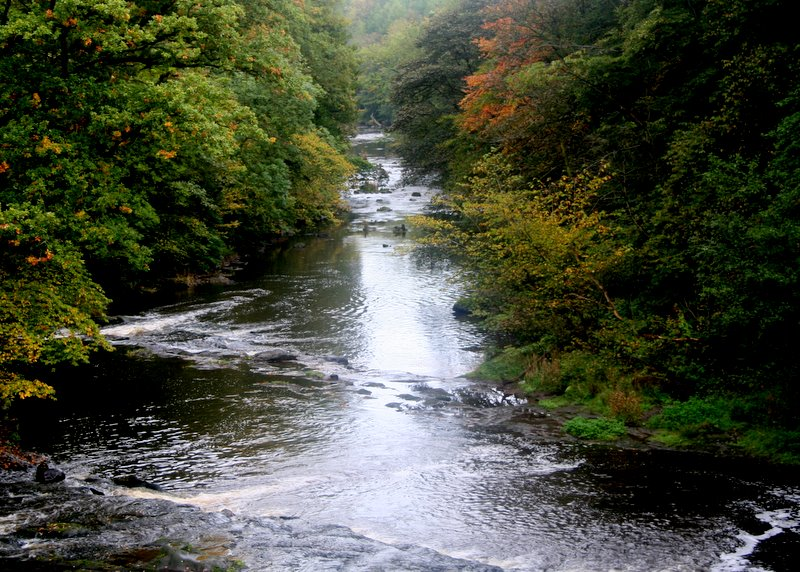

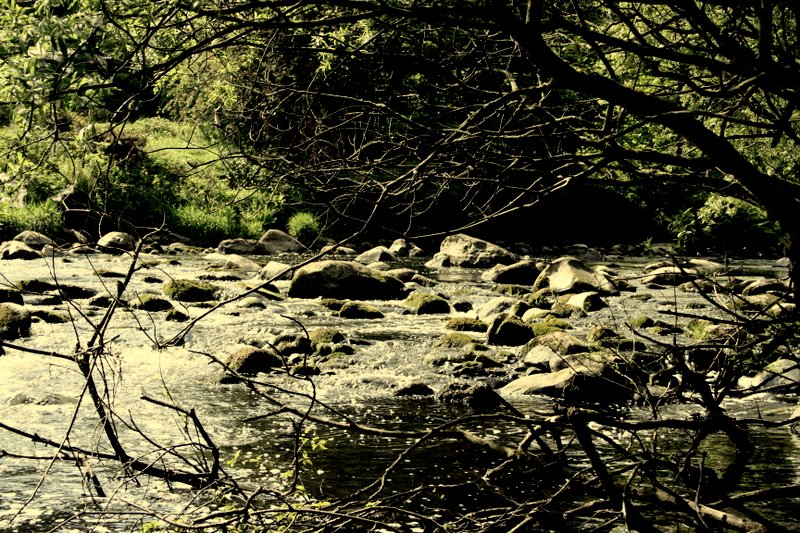

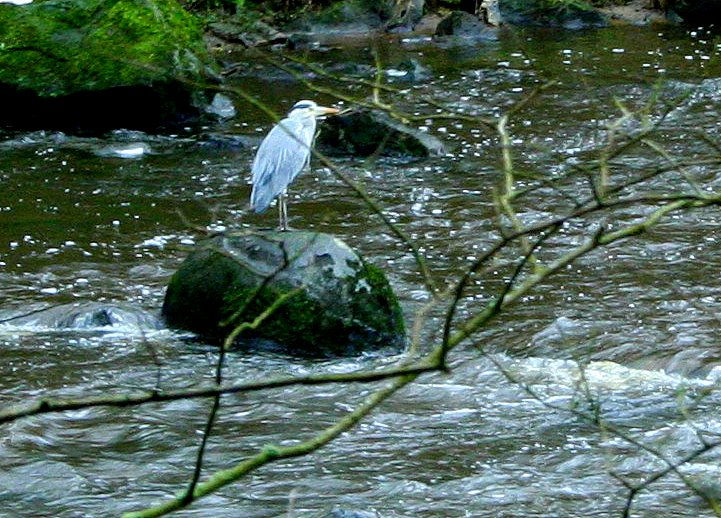

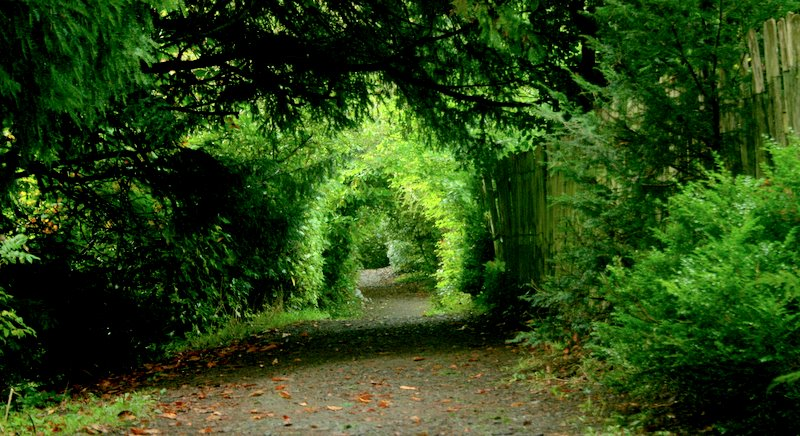

Almondell House and its estate dates to the 18th century. The House was erected in 1786, designed by its owner Henry Erksine, a lawyer. The house was the historic home of the Earls of Buchan (it is now Newnham House in England). Almondell House was demolished in 1969. The coach house and stable buildings of the house were converted into a visitor centre when the country park opened in the 1970s.

The Park also contains the Nasmyth Bridge, spanning over the Almond from the East Calder entrance. The bridge was originally constructed in 1810 to a design by Alexander Nasmyth. It was later completely restored in 1997/1998 following its partial collapse in 1973.

The Almondell Viaduct, also known as the Camps Viaduct, in the park, was built in 1885 to carry an industrial railway over the River Almond between Pumpherston and East Calder. The railway is now disused but the viaduct is in use as a path in the park.

Near to the viaduct is the Canal Feeder Aqueduct, a replica of the famous Iron Bridge in Shropshire. It carries water through a cast-iron trough to the Union Canal at Lin's Mill (Almond Aqueduct).

A pedestrian suspension bridge was built in the park in 1970. It was renamed the Nelson Mandela Bridge in 1985.

== Facilities and layout ==
The Almondell Estate follows the line of the River Almond, with paths and trails crisscrossing the river over a variety of bridges. It is a popular location with walkers and families. The Calderwood Estate nearby has paths and trails to explore. The two estates are separated by Mid Calder town centre but are linked together by a path following the line of the Murieston Water.

The Park is served with ample space for visitors’ cars, served by four main car parks. These are situated near Broxburn, Livingston, Mid Calder and East Calder. The North car park is closest to the Visitor Centre (EH52 5PE) which is housed in the former stable block of the Almondell Estate, vending drinks/snacks/gifts, aquarium. exhibition room and function room facilities, Countryside Ranger Service. There are many woodland and riverside walks, BBQ hire, toilet facilities and children's play area.
