= Blackburn House, West Lothian =

Coordinates: 55.8731°N 3.5983°W

Blackburn House
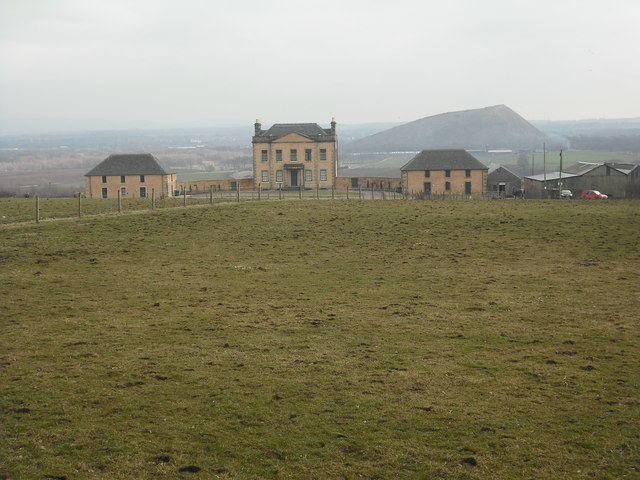

- Location within Scotland
- Location: EH47 7AQ Bathgate, UK

History
- Built: 1772
- Built for: George Moncrieff

Site notes
- Restored: 2008

Blackburn House is a category A-listed Georgian house, situated between Blackburn and Seafield near Bathgate in West Lothian, Scotland. The house comprises a compact central Palladian mansion house, with substantial east and west pavilions.

The house was built by George Moncrieff in 1772. Moncrieff also founded the small town of Blackburn, for which the House still provides a gateway landmark. The rural setting became transformed by coal and oil-shale mining, with miners' rows built in the adjacent villages. Most of the dereliction has since been cleared, although the conspicuous Five Sisters shale spoil tip survives, as a scheduled monument, still dominating the outlook south from the house.

The decay of Blackburn House stemmed from it becoming the farmhouse to a small farm, now no longer viable. The owners were unable to maintain the house, which was abandoned in 1972 for a new bungalow. Blackburn House thus fell into a state of serious disrepair, and was included in the Buildings at Risk Register for Scotland at its inception in 1990. The house could not be sold for private restoration as it stood amidst the working farm buildings. West Lothian Council's newly-established Lowland Crofting scheme provided a solution, with permission for ten new houses granted on condition the house was released, and a third of the farmland put into woods walks and wildlife for community benefit, reducing the farm itself to a smallholding.

Restoration was completed in May 2008. Today, the Blackburn House serves as an office, event, and filming location. Blackburn House won the Georgian Group Award in November 2008 for the Best Restoration of a Georgian Country House in the UK.
