= List of castles in West Lothian =

Locations of surviving castles in West Lothian

There are a number of castles in West Lothian, Scotland. They range from medieval mottes, through tower houses and Renaissance laird's houses, to relatively modern castellated mansions.

Many of the earliest castles are long since abandoned, and are either visible as earthworks, or only known from historical record. Later medieval and early modern buildings are often ruined, though several have been restored from a ruinous condition. Among those which have been continuously occupied are Bridge, Ochiltree and House of the Binns. Also within West Lothian is the ruined royal palace of Linlithgow, built on the site of an earlier fortification, but elaborated as one of the principal royal residences of the Scottish monarchy.

The council area of West Lothian lies to the west of Edinburgh, south of the Firth of Forth. The area differs from the historical county of West Lothian (Linlithgowshire): it includes castles which were formerly in Midlothian (e.g. Cairns Castle), and excludes others which were in West Lothian but now lie in Edinburgh (e.g. Dundas Castle).

== List of castles ==
Name	Type	Date	Condition	Ownership	Location	Notes	Picture
Abercorn Castle	Unknown	Unknown			Abercorn; NT 0828 7928; 55.9977°N 3.4721°W	William de Avenel held the lands of Abercorn in the 12th century, and the castle was later a stronghold of the Black Douglases. In 1455 James II moved to curb the power of the Douglases, capturing several of their castles, and on 18 April Abercorn Castle was destroyed following a siege. The site of the castle is within the grounds of Hopetoun House and was excavated in the 1960s. What was thought to be a motte was revealed as a later mound, covering the remains of 15th- and 16th-century buildings.	
Baads Castle	Unknown	1588			West Calder; NT 005 614; 55.836°N 3.589°W	Baads Castle was probably built in 1588. It was a property of the Douglas family, and burned down in 1736. The precise location is uncertain.	
Bathgate Castle	Motte	Unknown			Bathgate; NS 9807 6805; 55.8948°N 3.6314°W	Walter, High Steward of Scotland, received the barony and castle of Bathgate as part of the dowry assigned to his bride Marjorie Bruce, daughter of Robert the Bruce, in 1314. Walter died there in 1327, and the castle may have been little used afterwards. The only traces are a mound ringed by a double ditch, located within a golf course.	
Bonhard Castle	Tower house	16th century			Bo'ness		
Bridge Castle	Tower house	Unknown			Westfield; NS 9435 7095; 55.920°N 3.692°W	Constructed as a tower house in the 16th century, Bridge was the property of William Livingstone, 6th Lord Livingston, from 1578 and stayed in the family until their attainder in 1715. It was subsequently enlarged, then remodelled by Brown and Wardrop in 1886. In use as a hotel in the 1970s, it is now subdivided as apartments.	Bridge Castle seen through trees
Cairns Castle	Tower house	1440			Harperrig Reservoir; NT 0904 6051; 55.8292°N 3.4538°W	The remains of the 15th-century castle of the Crichton family stand beside Harperrig Reservoir in the Pentland Hills. Cairns was built for Sir George Crichton (d.1454), who served as Lord High Admiral of Scotland and was created Earl of Caithness in 1452. Originally an L-plan tower house, it comprised a main tower with a smaller stair tower to the south-west. The ruins stand around 9 metres (30 ft) high.	
Carribber Castle or Rob Gibb's Castle	Manor house	Unknown			Avon Valley, Linlithgow; NS 9657 7516; 55.9583°N 3.6581°W	In 1553 Robert Gib of Carribers was a baillie at the port of Newhaven near Edinburgh. Carribber Castle is the remains of a 16th-century manor house, and is unlikely to have been fortified due to its thin walls (less than 1 metre (3 ft 3 in) thick). Relatively little remains above ground, though the outlines of a courtyard and surrounding buildings can be traced, overlooking the steep Carribber Glen.	Drawing of Carribber Castle in 1837
Couston Castle	Tower house	Unknown			North Couston, Bathgate; NS 9558 7115; 55.9221°N 3.6724°W	Built at some point between the 15th and 17th centuries, Couston was an L-plan structure, owned by the Sandilands family. By the early 20th century it had been reduced to a fragmentary ruin adjacent to a farmyard. The remaining structure was declared dangerous in 2006 and was demolished. The only artifact recovered during demolition was a piece of Medieval redware pottery within the mortar.	
Duntarvie Castle	Renaissance house	1590			Winchburgh; NT 0905 7648; 55.9726°N 3.4588°W	James Durham was granted the Duntarvie estate in 1588, and the house was built afterward. A long, symmetrical house of the Scots Renaissance style, it later became part of the Hopetoun Estate. Roofless in the 1920s, restoration of the house began in 1995, though still incomplete in 2014.	
House of the Binns	Castellated house	1621–1630			Blackness; NT 0508 7857; 55.9907°N 3.5231°W	Site of a castle since the 15th century, The Binns was purchased by the Dalyell family in 1612 and rebuilt in the 1620s. The original building was extended several times, and remodelled entirely in the early 19th century. Notable residents include 17th-century general Tam Dalyell of the Binns, and the current occupant is former Labour MP Tam Dalyell. The house and parks have been managed by the National Trust for Scotland since 1944.	
Illieston Castle	Manor house	Unknown			Almond Valley, near Broxburn; NT 1008 6998; 55.9145°N 3.4401°W	The Stewart kings James II and James IV are said to have had a hunting lodge at Illieston. The present three-storey house is probably of late 16th century or early 17th century date. It was purchased by John Ellis, an advocate in Edinburgh, around 1663. He added a Renaissance gateway inscribed with his initials and the date 1665. Later it became the property of the Earl of Hopetoun. It is now a private house.	Distant view of Illieston Castle
Linlithgow Palace	Royal palace	1424 onwards			Linlithgow; NT 0019 7732; 55.9785°N 3.6009°W	A fortification known as The Peel was built here by Edward I of England in 1302. Rebuilt as a palace in 1424 by James I of Scotland and elaborated into a grand quadrangular complex by subsequent monarchs. One of the principal royal residences in Scotland until the accession of James VI to the throne of England in 1603. Afterwards it was seldom used, and the palace burned down while occupied by the Duke of Cumberland in 1746. Now in the care of Historic Environment Scotland.	
Lochcote Castle	Unknown	Unknown			Torphichen; NS 9769 7396; 55.9479°N 3.6399°W	Lochcote Castle comprises the remains of an angle tower, which were subsequently re-used as a doocot. The castle was replaced by Lochcote House, which was itself demolished in the 19th century.	Ruins of Lochcote Tower
Midhope Castle	Tower house				Abercorn; NT 0728 7868; 55.9921°N 3.4879°W	Built as a tower house in the late 16th century when it belonged to the Drummond family. Midhope was rebuilt and extended by John Hope when he acquired it in 1678, and is now part of the Hopetoun Estate. In 1926 the building was subdivided for apartments, but was afterwards empty. The interior contains plasterwork ceilings, though wall paintings were destroyed during consolidation work in the 1980s.	
Murieston Castle	Folly	Unknown			Murieston; NT 0501 6349; 55.8552°N 3.5189°W	Built as a tower house in the 16th century, Murieston was rebuilt as a folly in 1824, and few of its original features now remain. The two-storey structure now stands within a farmstead.	
Niddry Castle	Tower house	Unknown			Winchburgh; NT 0952 7437; 55.9538°N 3.4505°W	Niddry was a seat of the Seton family, and was constructed in the 15th-16th century. The 7th Lord Seton was one of the principal supporters of Mary, Queen of Scots, whom he brought here after her escape from Loch Leven. In the 17th century the tower was extended upwards, and it passed to the Hopes of Hopetoun around 1680. The ruined tower was subject to archaeological investigation in the 1980s, and was subsequently restored, though without the 17th-century upper floor.	
Ochiltree Castle	Laird's house	Unknown			Bridgend; NT 0326 7476; 55.9561°N 3.5509°W	Ochiltree was held by the Stirling family of Keir, and the house bears the initials of Sir Alexander Stirling and his wife Dame Grizel. It was built in the later 16th or early 17th century in the Scottish Renaissance style, and subsequently altered in the later 17th century. It is described as a "very fine example" of its type.	
Ogilface Castle	Tower house	Unknown			Woodend, Armadale; NS 9270 6901; 55.9022°N 3.7176°W	In the 12th century, Ogilface was owned by the Veteri Ponte family. In November 1203, William de Veteri Ponte [Vieuxpont] grants to Holyrood Abbey in free and perpetual alms his teinds on his land of Oggelfast and on his hunt, and the teinds of the men living on said land. Ref No: GD45/13/245 NAS. It later passed to the Earl of Linlithgow, and is said to have been used by the Covenanters during the religious conflicts of the 17th century. Now entirely ruined, archaeological surveys indicate a tower similar to Cramond Tower once stood on the site.	Kite aerial photo of the site of Ogilface Castle
Peel of Livingston	Unknown	Unknown			Livingston; NT 0398 6758; 55.8918°N 3.5368°W	The Peel of Livingston was established in the 14th century, and housed an English garrison in the Wars of Scottish Independence. In the 18th century the remains of earthwork defences could be observed, possibly a homestead moat, with a later house built inside. By the middle of the 19th century, these remains had been removed, and the area is now built up as part of the new town of Livingston. Excavations in the 1960s failed to uncover significant remains, and the precise site is now uncertain.	
Pumpherston Castle	Unknown	Unknown			Pumpherston; NT 0755 6865; 55.9021°N 3.4801°W	Although it may have once been a substantial building, nothing now remains of Pumpherston Castle, the ruins of which were removed in the late 18th century. It was the seat of a branch of the Douglas family from 1489 to the close of the 17th century.	
Staneyhill Tower	Tower house	Unknown			Hopetoun; NT 0916 7851; 55.9909°N 3.4577°W	Staneyhill was built in the 17th century for the Sharp family: the architect may have been Sir James Murray of Kilbaberton. William Sharp of Staneyhill was the brother of James Sharp, Archbishop of St Andrews, who was murdered by Covenanters in 1679. Only the stair tower now remains standing, with ruined lower walls of the house.	
Strathbrock Castle	Motte	Unknown			Uphall; NT 0575 7164; 55.9286°N 3.5099°W	The lands of Strathbrock were given to Freskyn, a Flemish nobleman, by David I in the 12th century. By the early 15th century it was in the hands of the Douglas family, and in 1524 the rector of Strathbrock Church lived there. The castle may have been a motte, with later stone buildings, and its remains were visible in the early 18th century. The area, to the south of Uphall's Main Street, is now built up.	
Tartraven Castle	Unknown	Unknown			Castlepark, Torphichen; NT 0045 7264; 55.9365°N 3.5951°W	Tartraven may have been a small castle or manor, and belonged to a family called Ross. The ruins were still visible in the early 19th century, but nothing now remains. The site is adjacent to Castlepark Farm, which may incorporate stone from the castle.	

== See also ==
- Castles in Scotland
- List of castles in Scotland
- List of listed buildings in West Lothian
