= Uphall =

Village in West Lothian, Scotland

Coordinates: 55.931°N 3.508°W

Uphall: Scottish Gaelic: Ubhalaidh; Scots: Uphauch
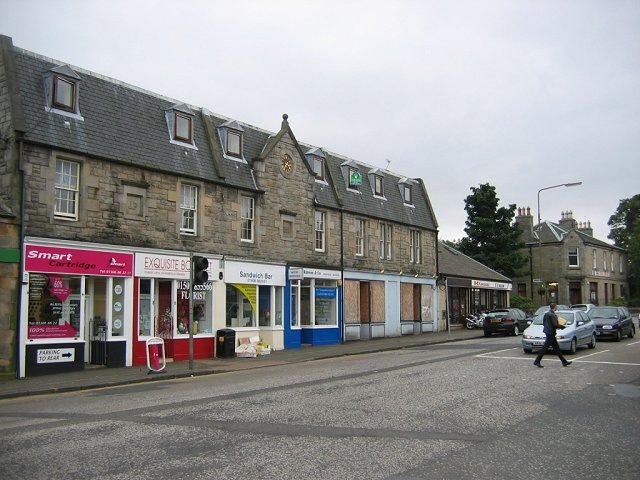
- Main Street, Uphall (2005)

- Location within West Lothian
- OS grid reference: NT058718
- Council area: West Lothian
- Lieutenancy area: West Lothian
- Country: Scotland
- Sovereign state: United Kingdom
- Post town: BROXBURN
- Postcode district: EH52
- Dialling code: 01506
- Police: Scotland
- Fire: Scottish
- Ambulance: Scottish
- UK Parliament: Livingston
- Scottish Parliament: Linlithgow

Uphall (Scots: Uphauch, Scottish Gaelic: Ubhalaidh) is a village in West Lothian, Scotland. It forms a conurbation with Broxburn to the east, Dechmont to the west and the major town of Livingston to the south west. Uphall is 30 miles from Glasgow and 14 miles from Edinburgh in the Scottish Lowlands. Uphall Station and Pumpherston are separate villages that lie to the south of Uphall.

Uphall has one primary school (Uphall primary school), several grocery stores, two cemeteries, a skatepark, football fields (King George Park), a golf course, a lawn bowls club (Middleton Hall) and a selection of public houses and hotels including the Volunteer Arms, Dovehill Arms, Oatridge Hotel and Houston House Hotel.

== History ==
Uphall was historically a small settlement known as Wester Strathbrock (from the Gaelic "Srath Bhroc" meaning valley of the badgers), with its neighbour Broxburn being named Easter Strathbrock.

The parish was centered around Strathbrock Castle (a Motte-and-bailey castle since demolished) and St Nicholas Church which were both built in the 12th century. Until the late 18th century, Uphall was a small rural community but the industrial revolution triggered growth as local mining activity increased. The largest growth was a direct result of the discovery and exploitation of local oil shale in the area, as well as across West Lothian generally. This triggered massive growth as many people moved to the area to gain employment in the oil shale mines and associated oil works. Surrounding villages expanded rapidly as rows of miners' cottages were erected to accommodate the influx of people, who relocated from places such as the Scottish Highlands and rural Ireland. This growth continued until the oil industry went into terminal decline between the 1920s and 1960s.

Post war industrial development at Greendykes and East Mains Industrial Estates, coupled with new employment throughout the West Lothian district, the new town of Livingston and increased commuting to Edinburgh, continued to see the village grow into a larger settlement contiguous with Broxburn in the 20th century.

== Transport ==
The A899 road is the primary road through Uphall, connecting the village with nearby Livingston to the south-east and Broxburn to the west. The A89 road and M8 Motorway lie immediately to the south of the village. The nearest railway station is Uphall railway station which lies to the south of Uphall at the smaller separate Uphall Station village.

Lothian Country operates multiple bus service that serve Uphall:

- X18 - Edinburgh - Corstorphine - Broxburn - Bathgate - Armadale - Whitburn
- N18 - Edinburgh - Corstorphine - Broxburn - Bathgate (Weekend Night Service)
- N43 - Edinburgh - Queensferry - Winchburgh - Broxburn - Dechmont (Night Service)
- 72 - Fauldhouse - Whitburn - Livingston - Broxburn - Winchburgh - Kirkliston

== Notable buildings ==
St Nicholas (Strathbock) Church is a mid-12th-century church with a small tower, a nave and large chancel (enlarged in the 13th century). The church is first recorded in 1270 and has been expanded over the centuries, with additional aisles added in the 17th and 19th centuries. The church was extensively restored in 1937. The church has a Romanesque 12th century doorway and some of the oldest church bells in West Lothian, with one dated to 1503.

The Oatridge hotel on the main street of Uphall was built in 1810 and is a former coaching inn (previously named the Uphall Inn) on the Airdrie to Bathgate to Edinburgh turnpike route.

Middleton Hall is an 18th-century house currently operating as a care home. The hall was built circa 1710 and reconstructed significantly in the late 19th century as the Headquarters of Scottish Oils Ltd. The adjacent streets (Westhall Gardens, Middleton Road and Middleton Avenue) were later developed in the 1920s as a small garden community (based on the Garden city movement) for workers of the Oil company.

Kirkhill House in Uphall was the principal residence of David Stewart Erskine, 11th Earl of Buchan in the latter part of the eighteenth century. The house fell into ruin when Erskine moved to Dryburgh and it has only recently been reconstructed as a private residence. Among the features were a remarkable accurate scale model of the Solar System in the gardens surrounding the house, and an accompanying astronomical pillar now located in Almondell country Park. At the centre of the model the Sun was represented by a stone globe 6 feet in diameter and the six planets known in 1776 were represented by small globes distributed around the gardens at appropriate distances. Erskine, his titles and his model are preserved in modern names such as Buchan Road, Buchan Port, Buchan Arms, Cardross Road and Globe Park.

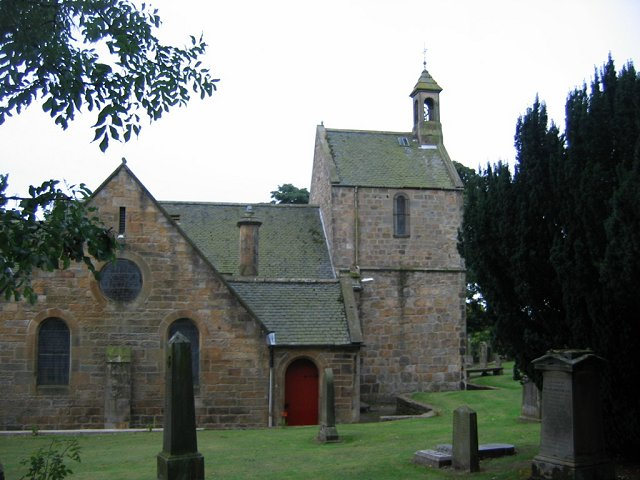
St Nicholas (Strathbrock) kirk, on the north side of Uphall

In the west of Uphall, Houston House is a four-storey white harl covered 16th-century tower house and hotel. Originally built for the local laird, the house was later purchased and expanded by John Shairp, an advocate to Mary, Queen of Scots. The house was restored by the architect Ian Lindsay in the 1940s as his home. In the 1970s, the house was purchased, refurbished and extended as a hotel.

== Culture and recreation ==
King George V's field is a 4.65-hectare (11.5-acre) public open space built as part of the King George's Fields programme.

In the west of the village, Uphall Golf Club is an 18-hole subscription/private membership golf course founded in 1895. In February 2021, the Golf Club was substantially damaged by a fire which took 12 hours to extinguish.

Middleton Hall Bowling Club is a local bowls club with 1930s origins.

Uphall previously had a public hall (built 1873) that became the local cinema house in the 1920s, before closing in 1974 (the site is now occupied by a car showroom). The cinema archives are held by West Lothian Council.

== Education ==
Uphall Primary School provides primary education for the community. The current school was constructed in the 1960s by Bamber Hall & Partners and has since been expanded. Before the 1960s the original primary school was located further west on a site on the corner of Strathbrock place and St.Andrews drive. This site has since been redeveloped as the Uphall Community Education Centre. The building incorporates a hall, youth room, playgroup room and coffee lounge. While there are no facilities for secondary education in Uphall itself, Broxburn Academy in Broxburn serves as the closest secondary school.

== Notable residents ==
- The Rev Alexander MacAndrew Gillespie OBE FRSE FRCPE FSAS FRGS (d.1984) minister and physician.
- Paul di Resta, the DTM champion 2010, and Formula One race driver in 2011–13 with the Force India F1 Team was born in Uphall on April 16, 1986.
- Anthony Jordan, former Archbishop of Edmonton, Canada
