= James Sandilands (courtier) =

Scottish courtier (died 1618)

Sir James Sandilands (died 1618) was a courtier to King James VI and I and captain of Blackness Castle.

== Career ==
James Sandilands of Slamannan was a Gentleman of the Bedchamber to the king in 1590 and later keeper of Blackness Castle.

He was a half-brother of Sir James Sandilands of Calder, Lord Torpichen, a son of John Sandilands of Calder and Jean Fleming, who was a daughter of Malcolm Fleming, 3rd Lord Fleming. For a time, he was "Tutor of Calder", in charge of his younger brother's estates. In June 1591, he was a curator of his brother's affairs, with two co-curators Joseph Douglas of Pumpherston and Andrew Sandilands.

He married Jean Crawfurd, and secondly Barbara Napier.

In August 1588 the Privy Council decided to raise a force against the threat from the Spanish Armada. Sandilands and George Douglas of Niddry were made captains of 100 light horsemen. The commander was Sir John Carmichael.

In May 1589 Sandilands helped the double-murderer Archibald Wauchope, younger of Niddrie, escape from Edinburgh's Tolbooth. Despite this, Sandilands soon regained royal favour.

== Norway and Denmark ==
Sandilands went with James VI to Norway in 1589 to meet Anne of Denmark. James Melville of Halhill mentions that Sandilands did not sail in the king's ship, but in one of three other ships, along with Lewis Bellenden, John Carmichael, the Provost of Lincluden, William Keith of Delny, George Home, and Peter Young.

On his return from Denmark James VI made his lodgings and privy chamber within Holyrood Palace more private than before, and Sandilands' role included deterring unwelcome visitors, like Lord John Hamilton. Sandilands' lodging at Holyrood was a bed chamber located on the floor above the King's cabinet room. He was knighted on 4 November 1590, when Alexander Lindsay was made Lord Spynie.

In 1590 and 1591 Sandilands was involved with the English subsidy money, accounting for £6,000 Scots brought by Thomas Foulis, giving £300 to John Wemyss of Logie and to an English woman called Rachael, and £260 to the king to play cards. In March 1591 he planned to visit the English court, but did not go.

The king gave him the estate of Cliftonhall, taken from Euphame MacCalzean (who was falsely convicted of witchcraft) in 1591.

== Bothwell ==
On 18 October 1591 Carmichael joined the Duke of Lennox and the Earl of Huntly in Leith to search for the rebel Earl of Bothwell. Carmichael captured Bothwell's servant Robert Scott, a brother of the James Scott of Balwearie with Bothwell's horse "Valentine".

On 27 December 1591 the Earl of Bothwell attacked Holyrood Palace and Sandilands was sent to fetch help from the Provost of Edinburgh, Nicol Uddert. On 13 January 1592 James VI was riding near Haddington, in pursuit of the Earl of Bothwell, and fell into the River Tyne. He changed clothes with Sandilands.

Sandilands was captain of Blackness Castle, and in March 1592 received the Earl of Huntly as a prisoner. The historian David Calderwood said that Huntly and his servants became the true keepers in effect. Another prisoner Colonel William Stewart, to gain favour and divert suspicions, asked Sandilands to accuse Alexander Lindsay, 1st Lord Spynie of entertaining the rebel Earl of Bothwell at Aberdour Castle in 1592 but he denied this.

Bothwell attacked Falkland Palace on 27 June 1592, with a force including men from the borders, both English and Scottish. Sandilands captured nine or ten men, mostly of the Armstrong surname, on Bothwellmure. Five were executed, but the others were spared at the request of the border warden Sir John Carmichael because they were not habitual border reivers.

== Lennox and the four young and counselling courtiers ==
Sandilands was a friend of the Duke of Lennox, and in June 1592 the Secretary Richard Cockburn of Clerkington heard that Lennox intended to go travelling with Sandilands and young Robert Melville, the son of the Treasurer-depute Robert Melville of Murdocairnie.

In August 1592 James VI gave him the forfeited lands of Archibald Wauchope of Niddrie, a supporter of Bothwell, who he had helped in the past.

In November 1592 Sandilands was identified with the Duke of Lennox, Sir George Home, Colonel William Stewart, the Laird of Dunipace, and Thomas Erskine, as a supporter of the king's former favourite James Stewart, Earl of Arran, working for his rehabilitation to the disadvantage of the Chancellor, John Maitland and the Hamilton family. The English diplomat Robert Bowes called this group the "four young and counselling courtiers." This faction was aligned with Anna of Denmark.

== A feud and with the Grahams ==
As tutor or administrator of James Sandilands of Calder, he entered into a dispute with the lawyer John Graham of Hallyards, over the lands of Hallyards in Midlothian. The elder Sandilands of Calder had granted Hallyards to his widow, who had married John Graham, but had also issued another disposition of the lands.

Lord Home invited an English official, John Carey, to come from Berwick to meet James VI at Dunglass in January 1595, but Carey refused to make the trip. James VI made a hunting trip to the area in February, planning to visit Dunglass, Spott, Beil, Waughton, and Seton.

On 13 or 14 February 1593 Sandilands shot John Graham dead in Leith Wynd in Edinburgh. Sandilands was in the company of the Duke of Lennox, going to play golf at Leith. It was said they had lured Graham to go Leith with an order for him to cross to Fife by ferry. Alexander Stewart of Newtonleys, a follower of the Duke of Lennox was also killed, by a pistol shot to the head. His father, also called Alexander Stewart, was Captain of Blackness. Calderwood said that Graham was finished off by Sir Alexander Stewart's French page in revenge for his master's death. Sandilands then went travelling in Italy, returning to London in September 1594. In January 1595 he fought with the Master of Graham and his followers on Edinburgh's Royal Mile, and was shot twice. George Lockhart of Ayr and John Spottiswoode, the future Archbishop of St Andrews came to his aid.

On January 1595, to avenge his kinsman, the Master of Graham fought with him on the Royal Mile at the Salt Tron. Sandilands' brother-in-law William Crauford, brother of the laird of Carse was killed. There were over 100 pistol shots and Sandilands was wounded. In the confusion, a rumour spread that King James was besieged in Holyrood Palace.

James VI made Sandilands and the Chancellor John Graham, 3rd Earl of Montrose agree in November 1599.

== Catherine Carnegie ==
In June 1593 he helped John Wemyss of Logie abduct Catherine Carnegie, the niece of David Carnegie of Colluthie, from Robert Jousie's house on the Royal Mile, for James Gray, a son of Lord Gray and a gentleman of the king's bedchamber. After this episode, he spent a year travelling in Italy and returned to London from Vlissingen on 17 September 1594.

== Lewis Adventurer and the Niddry estates ==
In December 1595 he received £1,000 from the treasurer, jointly with Robert Jousie for the expenses of the royal household.

In 1598 Sandilands was one of the Gentleman Adventurers of Fife, who attempted to resettle and colonise the Isle of Lewis.

Jean, a daughter of James Sandilands, married the younger Laird of Niddrie, Francis Wauchope, whose father Sandilands had helped to escape from the Tolbooth in 1589. In June 1600 Sandilands seemed likely to get the Laird of Niddrie restored to his estates, which angered Sir Robert Ker of Cessford, because Ker's cousin Andrew Edmonstone, Laird of Edmonstone had benefitted by Niddrie's forfeit. Ker argued with James that he ought not to restore the estates of followers of the Earl of Bothwell. A court found in January 1601 that Edmonstone was not liable to pay sums from the Niddry estate to Jean Sandlilands and Francis Wauchope.

On 6 August 1600 Sandilands and John Stewart, Master of Orkney rode to Dirleton Castle to arrest William and Patrick Ruthven, brothers of the Earl of Gowrie but they had fled, being forewarned by a man called Kennedy.

Will Elliot of Fiddleton stole two of his horses in 1602, and Robin Elliot of Redheugh, chief of the Elliots in Liddesdale had to pay Sandilands their value, £2000.

== At court in London ==
Sandilands was a gentleman usher of the privy chamber in 1604. On 27 March 1606 Anne of Denmark and Henry Frederick, Prince of Wales gave him silver gilt cups supplied by John Williams as presents at the christening of his child. Although the recorded names of Barbara Napier's children are John, Frederick, and Elizabeth, it is supposed this was the christening of "Anne Sandilands", mentioned below.

At the same period John Sandilands was appointed Groom of Prince Henry's Bedchamber in 1603, serving at Oatlands. John was the eldest son of Sir John Sandilands of Slamanno and Jean Crawford.

In September 1612 Sir James Sandilands "of Craghall" (perhaps Cliftonhall) and David Drummond, living in the Strand, made security for Sir George Carew's appearance in court for wounding William Brockas.

James Sandilands was appointed Master of Household to Princess Elizabeth in 1613. There is some confusion between James and John Sandilands, and several letters refer to "Sandilands" with no further qualification. "Sandilands" was said to have turned down a chance to be an equerry in the household of Prince Charles in July 1613.

=== The Ladies Hall of Deptford ===
On 4 May 1617, his daughter, Anne Sandilands, danced in Robert White's Masque of Cupid's Banishment, a show performed by young women from the Ladies Hall school at Deptford at Greenwich Palace for Anna of Denmark, with the encouragement of Lucy Russell, Countess of Bedford. Anne probably appeared as a companion of the goddess Diana paired with Anne Chalenor, both being Anna of Denmark's god-children.

A son, Richard Sandilands, was baptised at St Nicholas, Deptford, on 20 July 1615.

John Sandilands retired from Elizabeth's household in 1615. John Sandilands died three years later and was buried at Greenwich on 7 June 1618.

Elizabeth's Master of Household James Sandilands, was said to be alive in 1634 when another christening is mentioned. This was probably a son, also James, and grandson of the Master of Household. Colonel James Sandilands of Slamman was in the service of the Dutch Republic.
