= Sir John Seton (letter writer) =

Sir John Seton was a Scottish aristocrat and soldier who wrote letters to his cousin Alexander Montgomerie, 6th Earl of Eglinton, previously known as Alexander Seton of Foulstruther.

== Family and military background ==
The Earl of Eglinton had a brother, Sir John Seton of St Germains in East Lothian, who married Margaret Kellie. He does not seem to have been the letter writer, as the Earl of Eglinton's brother, George Seton, 3rd Earl of Winton calls John Seton the correspondent their cousin. Letters from two cousins called Sir John Seton survive.

=== Sir John Seton of the French King's Guard ===
John Seton, the letter writer, was a Lieutenant of the French Royal Guard, the Gardes Écossaises. There were three John Setons answering this description.

The Earl of Eglinton had a cousin, John Seton, the younger son of William Seton of Kylesmure, who is said to have served in France with Colonel Hepburn.

Another cousin, John Seton, was a younger son of John Seton and Isabel Balfour of Carriston, at Star in Fife, and a grandson of George Seton, 6th Lord Seton. He married a daughter of the Comte de Bourbon (perhaps a daughter of Charles, Count of Soissons). Their only child was a daughter, who married the Hepburn laird of "Adinston" (possibly Hadddington) in East Lothian, a relative of the soldier John Hepburn.

Another Scottish soldier of the Thirty Years' War, Alexander Seaton, may have been the brother of the letter writer.

=== Sir John Seton of Gargunnock ===
According to Edward Dunbar Dunbar, the letter writer was John Seton of Gargunnock, the husband of Margaret Hamilton of Elieston (Illieston House), the widow of John Stewart of Methven. Dunbar published a letter to Sir Robert Gordon signed "Johan Seton" and dated London 6 June 1636, mentioning a Polish ambassador in London. Seton's brother (possibly Alexander) had approached the ambassador seeking employment. Lord Herries would bring the letter to Robert Gordon. Seton by courtesy calls Gordon his father.

In July 1638 a Sir John Seton was in London and was asked by Sir Henry Bruce if he would serve in Scotland for Charles I against the Covenanters in the Bishop's War, he replied he would fight for the king but not in his own country, "where his life was". The historian Steve Murdoch notes that this Seton was a Colonel in the Swedish army.

Sir John Seton of Carchunoth had brought 1,200 Scottish recruits from the Dutch Republic to Bohemia in 1619. Seton was the military governor of Třeboň in Bohemia in 1620, while Henry Bruce commanded Mikulov in Moravia. The governor of Hagelburg (in 1638), Colonel Thomas Thomson, another officer of the Gardes Écossaises, later partnered with John Clerk of Penicuik and bought soft furnishings in Paris for the Earl of Lothian.

"Carchunoth" was Gargunnock in Stirlingshire. The commander in Bohemia was a member of the Seton of Touch branch of the family, and a more distant cousin of the Earl of Eglinton than the son of the lairds of Carriston or Kylesmure. Two Colonels, James Seton of Gargunnock (in Swedish service) and his brother John Seton or Seaton are recorded in this period. Thomas Urquhart mentions these brothers in The Jewel, calling both "James".

== Letters to the Earl of Eglinton ==
John Seton signs his name as "Johan Seton". A letter of 1643 describing campaigns in Lancashire is also signed "Johan Seton". The letters were published by the historian William Fraser in 1859 and 1885 and are now held by the National Records of Scotland.

In a letter of 10 September 1634, John Seton mentions his niece Elizabeth Forrester. He wrote that he would be pleased to host Eglinton's children in London. His own son, the child of a German woman was at school in Prestonpans in Scotland. Seton hoped to buy an estate in Scotland. He sent news of the Thirty Years' War.

The other Sir John Seton wrote from France in November 1634, having hosted Eglinton's sons in Paris. One of the Eglinton children, Henry, was left in London in the care of the courtier and architect David Cunningham of Auchenharvie.

John Seton sent "woman's bands" and other items of clothing for "her ladyship", Margaret Scott, in January 1642. The clothes were "very curious and of the newest sort of lace and making". He promised to send Eglinton the requested diamond, with hoods and masks for the ladies (Eglinton's daughters), silk stockings, garters, roses, gloves, and fans. Charles I had asked for Pym and Holles in Parliament.

In April 1645 John Seton sent the Earl of Eglinton shopping from London, including white gloves and perfumed "sweet gloves", a silk waistcoat, and a bundle of lute strings. He sent news of Thomas Fairfax and Captain Cromwell and his hopes for the relief of Tauntondean.

On 30 March 1646 he signed a receipt (as "Johan: Seton") on behalf of Baron Schomberg for a purse of gold coins bequeathed to him by his aunt in Edinburgh Mary Sutton, Countess of Home, and delivered by her executors the Earl of Lauderdale and Earl of Moray. The receipt was witnessed by the countess' footman Andrew Young.
