= John Stewart of Methven =

Scottish governor of Dumbarton Castle (died 1628)

Sir John Stewart of Methven (died 1628) was governor of Dumbarton Castle and Admiral of the Western Seas

== Family and marriage ==
Sir John Stewart of Methven was an illegitimate son of Ludovic Stewart, 2nd Duke of Lennox.

Stewart married Margaret Hamilton, a daughter of Sir Claud Hamilton of Shawfield, Rutherglen, and Illieston (d. 1614). He was made keeper of Dumbarton Castle in 1620, the position was in the gift of the Lennox family.

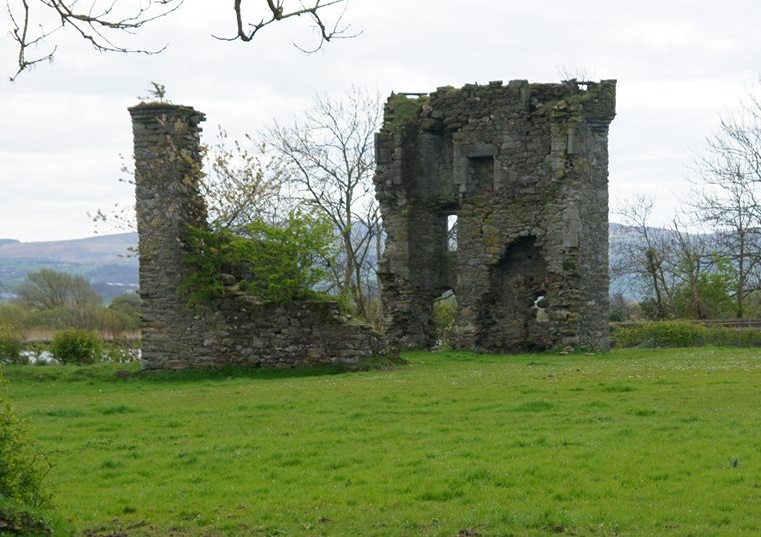
Mongavlin Castle

== Life ==
=== Prisoners ===
Margaret was a Catholic, and she was converted from her Catholicism by a prisoner in the castle, Alexander Simpson (1570-1639), minister of Dryburgh and Merton, in 1621. John Stewart was said to have treated Simpson and another minister, Andrew Duncan, very courteously and paid for their food and lodging. Prisoners at Dumbarton were usually expected to pay for their food.

=== Garrison at Dumbarton, duties unfulfilled ===
In 1625, Sir John Stewart of Methven undertook to have 16 "fensible men in ordinary" in the castle, as a garrison to keep watch and ward, and his successor Sir John Stewart of Traquair was charged to do the same. Methven was said to have been lax in his duties at Dumbarton, spending time in Ireland at Mongavlin Castle which he had acquired and built in 1611 and his lands in Raphoe in Portloughe, both in Donegal. These lands in the Plantation of Ulster had been granted to his father, the Duke of Lennox.

=== Adultery and imprisonment ===
In September 1626 the Privy Council found he had been living in adultery in Dumbarton Castle with two servant women, Isobel Beaton and Margaret Kilmaurs, and had kept his wife, Dame Margaret, a prisoner in a ruinous and damp part of the castle for 13 days, chained to the bed, and he beat her. Isobel Beaton and Isobel Scot had previously been admonished by Dumbarton Kirk for scandalous behaviour. Some of Stewart's cruelty was to coerce her to sign some legal papers. Stewart spent some time as a prisoner in Edinburgh Castle and Blackness Castle in 1626. He wrote angry letters to his servant William Young who had escaped to Ireland taking his valuable possessions.

== Death ==
Stewart was found guilty of three adulteries and sentenced to be executed "by the king’s will", and the court ordered that he should be hanged in December 1627. It is unclear if he was hanged, but steps were made to secure the income of Lady Methven from his estate, and he was dead by 1630 when a legal case mentions his decease, and his widow Margaret Hamilton married Sir John Seton of Gargunnock in 1629.
