= John Graham, Lord Hallyards =

Scottish lawyer and Senator of the College of Justice

John Graham, Lord Hallyards (c.1530–1593) was a Scottish lawyer and Senator of the College of Justice who sat in judgement in two famous trials in Scottish history. He was murdered in a feud.

== Career ==
Little is known of Graham's early life. He is said to have been a cousin of John Graham, 3rd Earl of Montrose. He trained as a lawyer and was successful in this role. In January 1579 he is recorded as Justice Depute to the Earl of Argyll.

Around 1578 he was married to Janet Murray (d.1596), a daughter of William Murray of Polmaise, and widow of Sir James Sandilands, 1st Lord Torphichen and through her became the owner of Hallyards near Kirkliston in West Lothian. In March 1578, he wrote a note to the English ambassador Thomas Randolph hoping to see him before he left Edinburgh. Randolph was staying at Robert Gourlay's house on the Lawnmarket.

In the spring of 1581 he oversaw his most famous case, the trial of Regent Morton, which resulted in his execution by beheading on 2 June 1581. Early in May 1584, he was one of the judges commissioned to serve in Stirling at the trial of William Ruthven, 1st Earl of Gowrie which resulted in his beheading on 3 May 1584 for witchcraft. On 23 May 1584 he was elected a Senator of the College of Justice in place of Robert Pont who had been forced to resign.

== Feud over Hallyards ==
In February 1593 in broad daylight, John Graham was shot dead in Edinburgh at the foot of Leith Wynd, next to the building known as "Paul's Work", just north of Trinity College Kirk. The murder, by James Sandilands of Slamannan (nephew of his wife's first husband) and others, was not prosecuted.

James Sandilands was the "tutor" or administrator of young James Sandilands of Calder. He disputed the ownership of the lands of Hallyards with Graham. The elder Sandilands of Calder had granted Hallyards to his widow, who had married John Graham. However, he had also issued another disposition of the lands.

There are several accounts of the shooting on 13 or 14 February 1593 in Leith Wynd. Sandilands was in the company of the Duke of Lennox, going to play golf at Leith. It was said they had lured Graham to go Leith with an order for him to cross to Fife by ferry. Alexander Stewart of Newtonleys, a follower of the Duke of Lennox was also killed, by a pistol shot to the head. David Calderwood said that Graham was finished off by Sir Alexander Stewart's French page in revenge for his master's death.

After his death, his wife Janet Murray, was married for a third time to Peter Young, tutor and almoner to King James VI.

Hallyards Castle near Kirkliston was rebuilt in 1630 but is now ruined. There was another Hallyards Castle in Fife.
