= Murieston =

Coordinates: 55.86727°N 3.50301°W

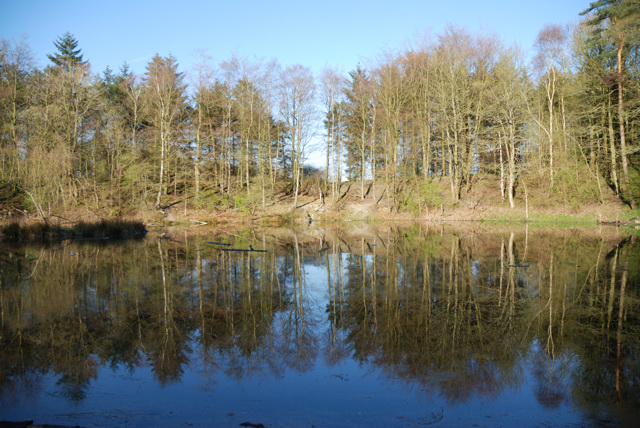
Campbridge Pond adjacent to Murieston Water

Murieston (From Muir (moor) of Houstoun) is a primarily residential district on the southern edge of Livingston, West Lothian, Scotland. It lies to the south-east of Bellsquarry.

== Buildings ==
Most of the housing is privately owned and the majority are medium to large detached properties. There are a small number of shops and restaurants at Bankton Retail Centre, adjacent to the train station. An NHS Scotland medical practice is located on Alderstone road in Murieston.

Murieston House is an early 19th century Georgian country house (built for Henry Jamieson, an Edinburgh banker) that remains in use as private residences, including the adjacent steadings. Adjacent to the house, there is a rubble bridge built circa 1800.

Murieston Castle is small, roofless ruined fortified tower on the edge of Murieston farm.

== Leisure ==
The district lies on both sides of Murieston Water which is flanked by public parks (including Campbridge Park and Murieston Play Park), the Campbridge Pond and adjacent farmland/moorland. This includes the Murieston Trail, a wooded trail with meadows and a play park. Murieston Woods are a 3.43 ha (8.48 acres) mixed woodland) managed by the Woodland Trust.

Livingston Cricket Club, founded in 1981 is located in Murieston.

Murieston United is a local community football club, established in 1985.

== Education ==
Williamston Primary School is located in Murieston.

== Transport ==
Livingston South railway station on the line connecting Edinburgh and Glasgow Central, is located in Murieston.

The A71 road runs along the northern boundary of the district. A limited, council funded, bus service links Murieston to Dedridge and Almondvale only, service 9 is currently run by SD Travel.
