= Alexander Stewart (diplomat) =

Scottish courtier and diplomat

Alexander Stewart (died 1593) was a Scottish courtier and diplomat.

He was a younger son of Alexander Stewart of Scotstounhill, a captain of Blackness Castle, and Elizabeth Hamilton.

== Blackness Castle ==
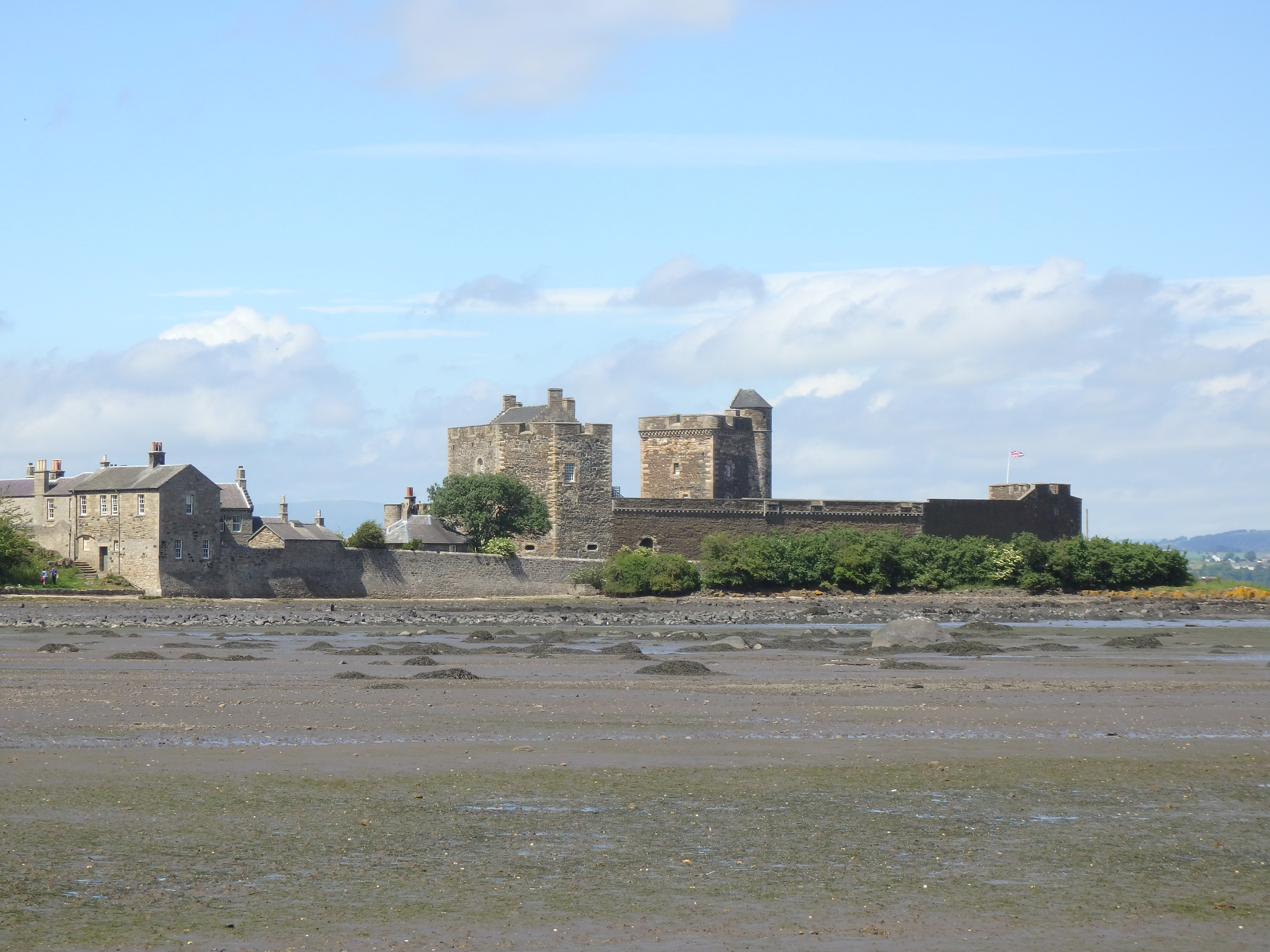
Alexander Stewart of Scotstounhill was keeper of Blackness Castle

The older Alexander Stewart confirmed as keeper of Blackness Castle in March 1568. His record as captain of Blackness for the Scottish crown was a subject of comment by Richard Bannatyne. In March 1572, during the Marian Civil War, he surrendered the castle to the supporters of Mary, Queen of Scots, for 300 crowns, after his expenses had not been met by the King's side. In January 1573, he was made captain again, and pledged his eldest son as hostage for his good service.

Unfortunately, while he was making these arrangements in Edinburgh, one of his prisoners, James Kirkcaldy bribed the guards and took Blackness. Kirkcaldy then managed to capture Alexander Stewart and his brother John and locked them up in their own castle. Alexander Stewart set about bribing the same soldiers and Regent Morton forced James Kirkcaldy's wife Helen Leslie to make him surrender. When Helen Leslie came to Blackness, James Kirkcaldy came to the iron yett to welcome her and his soldiers shut him out and pelted him with stones from the tower.

Other sources suggest that James Kirkcaldy, brother of the Marian leader William Kirkcaldy of Grange, surrendered Blackness to Regent Morton after a conventional siege.

== Rumours of a royal kidnap ==
Robert Bowes was told in December 1582 that Alexander Stewart, son of the captain of Blackness, knew of plans to destabilize the Ruthven regime, an English-leaning Scottish government, and return Esmé Stewart, 1st Duke of Lennox to power at the Scottish court. The plan was revealed by a sompter man from the royal stable. It was said that Alexander Stewart and others including the sons of Lord Seton would surprise the king at Holyrood Palace during supper. The raiders would enter the palace through the Abbey, using the "dark stair" into a long gallery, then access the "little gallery" under the king's lodging when his attendants were eating elsewhere. The palace porter John Bog would give them keys. Some of the alleged conspirators were arrested and the English diplomat Robert Bowes was told that had been shown the "boot", an instrument of torture, in order to make them talk.

== Mission to England ==
In 1586 Alexander Stewart, the son, was involved in negotiations after Mary, Queen of Scots, had been sentenced to death in England. James VI sent him with messages to Robert Dudley, 1st Earl of Leicester. In London, Stewart joined other Scottish diplomats including the Master of Gray and Robert Melville. The Master of Gray wrote that Stewart was a "wyse gentleman".

In January 1587, his actions displeased his colleagues, who felt he was undermining their work to save the queen's life. Melville wrote that Stewart was doing harm, had exceeded his credit as a diplomat, and was insisting that he alone knew the king's mind. The Scottish Justice Clerk, Lewis Bellenden wrote to Lord John Hamilton that Stewart was returning to Scotland to make a "denial for himself", and would affirm that the Archibald Douglas and the Earl of Leicester had tried to bribe him to confirm certain speeches made in his name.

Courcelles, a French diplomat in Scotland, reported the reception of mixed messages in Edinburgh. Stewart had claimed to have "more express and secret charge" than the other ambassadors, even suggesting that a gift of "dogs and deer" would placate James after the execution of Mary, Queen of Scots. Courcelles wrote that James VI said that "if Stuart came [returned], he would hang him before he put off his boots", and if Elizabeth meddled with his mother's life James would follow up with more than the "dogges and deare" she sent him as gifts.

It remains unclear if Stewart was acting with special instructions from James VI. He was sent to Scotland without the consent of the other diplomats and brought letters from the Earl of Leicester to James VI which discredited the Master of Gray.

George Young, another negotiator in London, was disappointed by Stewart's conduct as a diplomat, and wrote to William Cecil that he was, "sory in gude faith that he or any Scottisman sould overshute himself sa farre in a mater quhilk I doubt not his majestie will let appeare mair clearlie".

== Bridge Castle ==
In March 1587, his parents and older brother James Stewart sold the lands and castle of Little Ogilface in Brighouse near Torphichen to William Livingstone, 6th Lord Livingston. The castle, probably built by James Stewart and his wife Helen Sinclair, is now known as "Bridge Castle".

== Feud ==
Alexander Stewart became involved in a feud between a wealthy lawyer, John Graham of Hallyards, and the Sandilands family which followed a dubious property transaction. On 13 February 1593 James Sandilands of Slamannan, the Duke of Lennox, and Alexander Stewart were going to play golf. They encountered John Graham and his followers on Leith Wynd. The Grahams opened fire and Stewart was killed by head wound. John Graham was shot and carried to a nearby house where Stewart's French page stabbed him to death.
