= Dukla Pumpherston =

Association football club in Scotland

Dukla Pumpherston is a charity football team based in Scotland, and is captained by Scottish football pundit Chick Young.

The name was based on the fictional team "Dukla Pumpherston Sawmill and Tannery" created by Tony Roper in 1980s comedy programme Naked Radio; the name is a comic juxtaposition of the sophisticated European-sounding name of Czech team Dukla Prague with that of tiny Scottish village Pumpherston. Roper himself has also played for the team.

The players have been described as a motley crew of former professional players and television personalities who tour the country - indeed the world - enjoying themselves while raising cash for worthy causes. They have been described as "a drinking team with a football problem". The ad hoc roster (or that of similarly informal opposing charity teams) has, at various times, included football broadcaster Chic Charnley, politician Tommy Sheridan, boxer Willie Limond, airport worker John Smeaton, and footballers Ally McCoist, Neil Lennon, Jose Quitongo, Frank McAvennie, Gordon Smith, Gerry McCabe, Jim Duffy, Billy Dodds, Gerry Britton, Jim Chapman, Brian McPhee, Davie Irons, and Brian Martin.

Dukla is not a regular member of the Scottish amateur league system; the team only plays occasional exhibition matches, generally in support of charity. Due to the informal nature of the games and the widely varying ages and footballing histories of the players (and those of their opponents) Dukla matches are usually friendly, light-hearted affairs. One exception was an October 2008 match against a team of MSPs and other politicians; the match was abandoned after three politicians were sent off and players from both sides squared up to each other.

In 2021, the club enlisted football design agency Clan United to rebrand the club crest. Paying homage to the fictitious backstory, the new crest was inspired by Sparta Praha, FK Příbram, and Dukla Praha.
