= Uphall Station =

Coordinates: 55.918°N 3.504°W

Uphall Station: Scottish Gaelic: Stèisean Ubhalaidh; Scots: Uphauch Station
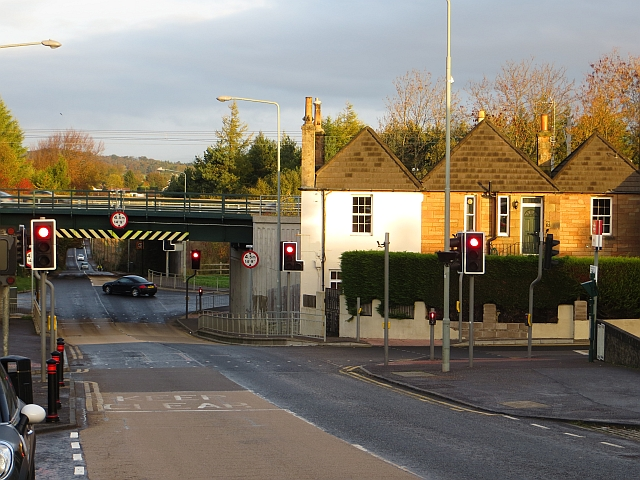
- Pumpherston Road, Uphall Station

- Location within West Lothian
- OS grid reference: NT060704
- Civil parish: Uphall
- Council area: West Lothian
- Lieutenancy area: West Lothian
- Country: Scotland
- Sovereign state: United Kingdom
- Post town: LIVINGSTON
- Postcode district: EH54
- Dialling code: 01506
- Police: Scotland
- Fire: Scottish
- Ambulance: Scottish
- UK Parliament: Livingston
- Scottish Parliament: Almond Valley

Uphall Station is a village located in West Lothian, Scotland. The name is derived from the neighbouring town Uphall on account of the railway station located on the northeast perimeter of the village. The village is situated southeast of Uphall and Broxburn, north of Pumpherston and northeast of Livingston. It lies approximately one-quarter mile (400 metres) from the M8, which is a major road running between Greenock in the west of Scotland and Edinburgh in the east of Scotland. A gala day (an outdoor fête) is held annually, usually in June.

== Housing ==
Uphall Station has a variety of housing, including old Victorian and Edwardian stone-built cottages, modern housing estates, bungalows and cottages. The cottages were built during the mining days of Uphall Station to house the large mining community, since each property has been extended in different ways, every property is unique and house prices vary. Some cottages have low maintenance yards whilst others have very large (3000sqft/ 300sqm) back gardens. Houses in the area have recently sold for over £300,000 with the new Dundas Estate houses selling for between £250,000 and over £300,000.

== Natural landscape ==
Uphall Station encompasses a nationally significant population of protected Great Crested Newts, thought to be to third largest breeding site in Scotland. The site, to the North East of the main thoroughfare of Pumpherston Road, is also home to badgers, wild roe deer, foxes, Soprano pipistrelle bats, 17 species of rare and at danger bird species including Grey partridge, yellowhammers, Skylarks and birds of prey. In all, the area is home to over 100 species of animals and many species of wild flowers. The area is open access and currently utilized as arable farmland as well as a training ground for local amphibian welfare charities due to its highly accessible nature by road and rail.

== Crime levels ==
Uphall Station has a relatively low crime rate compared with the rest of West Lothian and is therefore considered a safe place to raise children. According to Police Scotland, West Lothian has a much lower than average crime and offence rate which is lower than every city in Scotland, including a crime rate nearly 30% lower than Edinburgh, 64% lower than Glasgow and a third lower than Falkirk.

Dishonesty crimes in West Lothian are half that of Edinburgh and violent crime is 72% lower than that of Glasgow. This is possibly attributed to the numerous neighbourhood watch schemes in the area and the number of affluent commuters who reside in the village.

== Services ==
Uphall Station has a population of around 1,026 residents; Uphall Station has a significant proportion of commuters to Edinburgh due to its reputation as a safe commuter village with exceptional links to Edinburgh, Glasgow and other parts of West Lothian through ScotRail, M8 motorway and Lothian Country Buses.

There are numerous local taxi companies which can take you to Livingston, Edinburgh airport and Edinburgh as well as further afield.

== Public transport ==
Lothian Country Buses operate the bus service calling at Uphall Station, Service 72 between Fauldhouse & Kirklison via Whitburn, Livingston, Broxburn & Winchburgh.

Uphall rail station is exceptionally popular with Edinburgh commuters with up to four trains an hour from 6am until midnight and the journey taking less than 20 minutes to reach the heart of Edinburgh. Commutes to Glasgow are also popular due to the reliable service every 15 minutes.

Uphall Station is also ideally situated for Edinburgh Airport which is a short drive or taxi ride away.

== Amenities ==
Within Uphall Station, shops and services include: a small supermarket, local pub with pool and darts hall, a hairdresser salon, a bowling club and a Thai restaurant. West Lothian Council operates a mobile library service as it lies outside the one-mile (1.5-kilometre) threshold of a local library.

Uphall Station is adjacent to a large country park which houses a variety of local animals including deer, birds of prey, endangered great crested newts and other nesting birds.

Within a five-minute walk lies a popular Indian restaurant, Scotmid, another corner shop, upscale golf club with dining facilities and two Chinese takeaways.
