= Drumshoreland railway station =

Former railway station in Scotland

Coordinates: 55.9210°N 3.4647°W

Drumshoreland
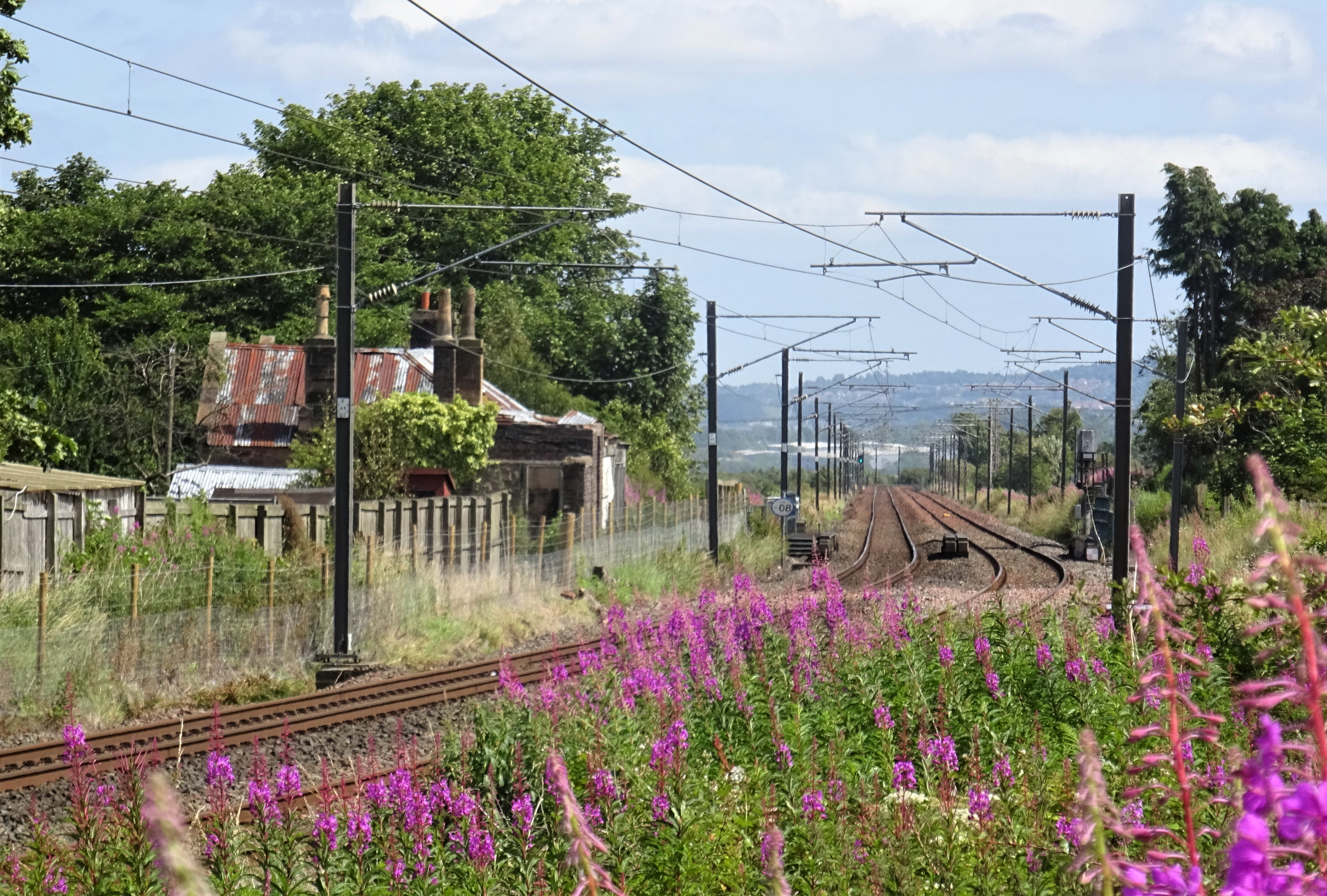
- The site of the station in 2019

General information
- Location: West Lothian; Scotland
- Platforms: 2

Other information
- Status: Disused

History
- Original company: Edinburgh and Bathgate Railway
- Pre-grouping: North British Railway
- Post-grouping: London and North Eastern Railway

Key dates
- 12 November 1849: Opened as Broxburn
- 1 May 1870: Renamed as Drumshoreland
- 18 June 1951: Closed
Location

Drumshoreland railway station was a railway station in West Lothian, Scotland. It was located on the Edinburgh and Bathgate Railway.

== History ==
Opened in 1849 as Broxburn, it replaced the station of the same name on the nearby Edinburgh and Glasgow Railway. Subsequently renamed as Drumshoreland in 1870, the station was closed in 1951.

The station had a small two road goods yard on the south of the line, and 3 chains east of the station a trailing junction joined the up line from Albyn oil works in Broxburn, forming a branch to that site. 9 chains north of the mainline (between Broxburn and the M8 motorway) a line branched west and crossed the mainline near to the hamlet of Cawburn. The line passed behind the cottages and connected to the Camps Branch. A further trailing junction connected this spur to the main up line. Further east, between Drumshoreland and Bathgate (Newbridge) junction, a branch left the up line and headed north east, passing under the Edinburgh and Glasgow railway to serve Newliston shale mine (just south of Kirkliston). The course of these lines can be seen on sheet 73 within this link (Ordnance Survey Maps One-inch "Popular" edition, Scotland, 1921–1930) on the National Library of Scotland digital library (Maps)

== Services ==
Preceding station	Historical railways	Following station
Uphall; Line and Station open	North British Railway; Edinburgh and Bathgate Railway	Ratho; Line open; Station closed
