= Ludovic Stewart, 2nd Duke of Lennox =

Scottish nobleman and politician (1574–1624)

His Grace The Duke of Lennox
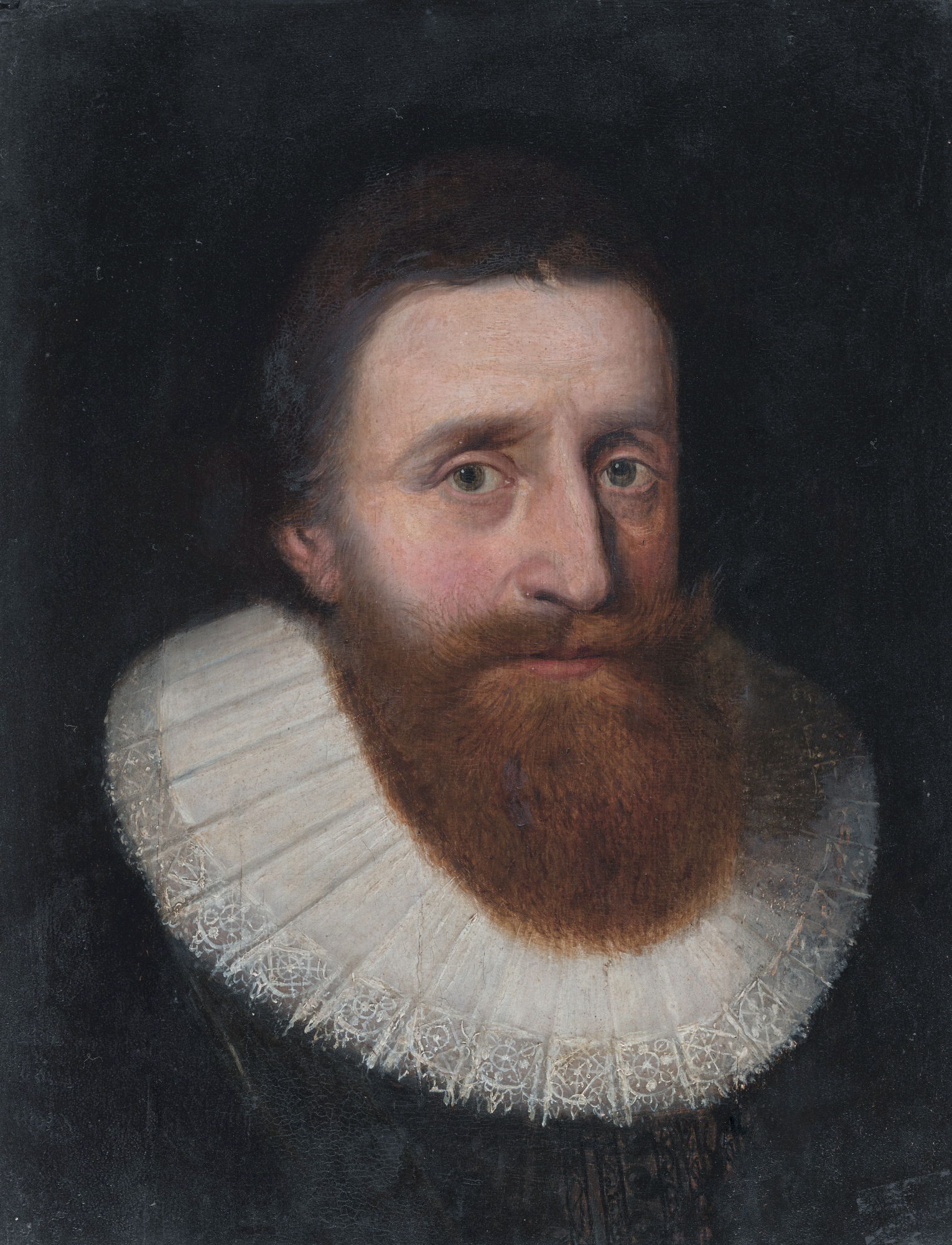
- Born: 29 September 1574
- Died: 16 February 1624 (aged 49)
- Resting place: Westminster Abbey, London
- Title: 2nd Duke of Lennox; 1st Duke of Richmond
- Spouses: Sophia Ruthven; Jean Campbell; Frances Howard
- Children: John
- Parent(s): Esmé Stewart, 1st Duke of Lennox and Catherine de Balsac

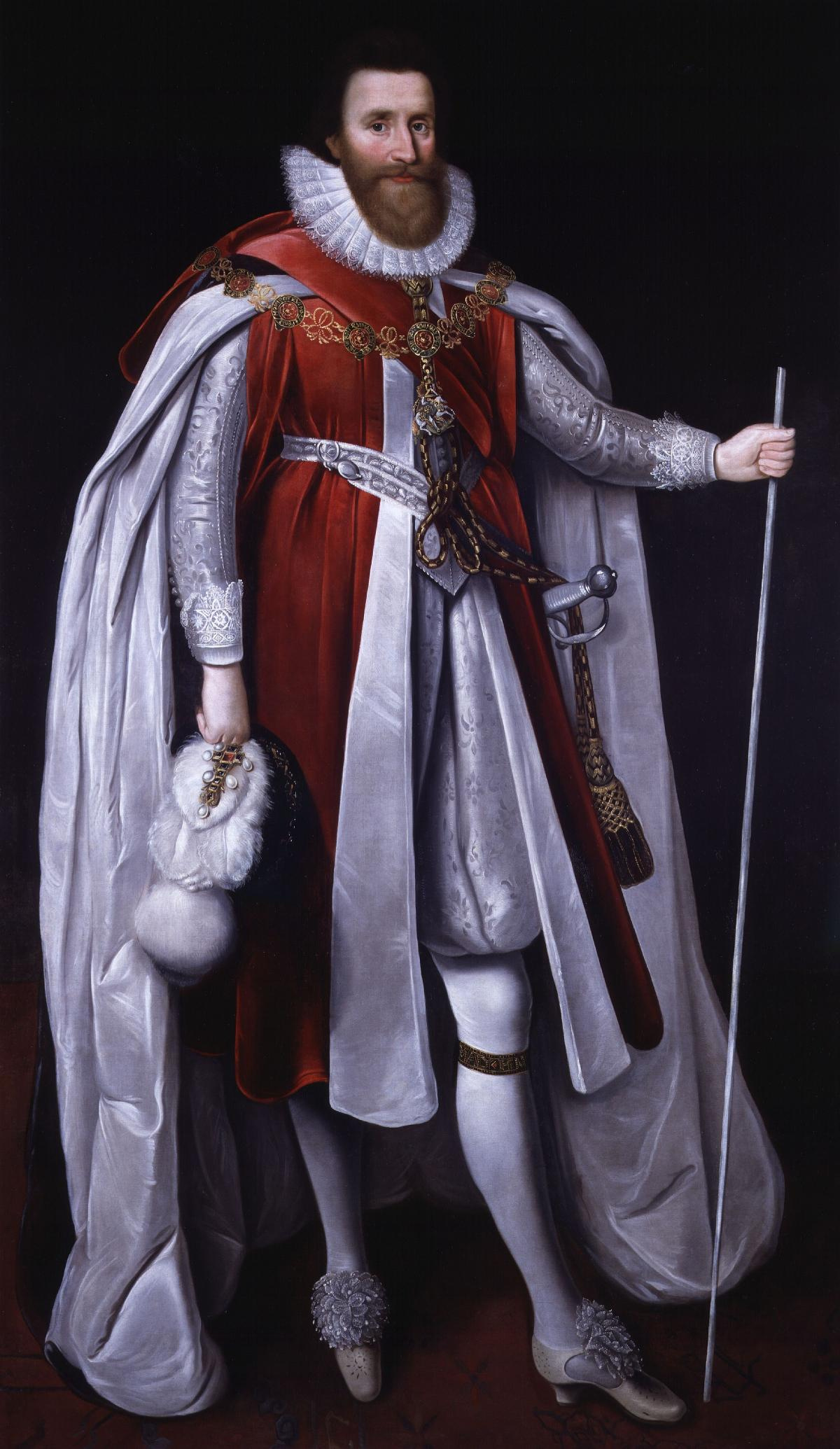
Ludovic Stewart, 1st Duke of Richmond, 2nd Duke of Lennox, holding white staff of office, wearing the Garter and Collar of the Order of the Garter. Portrait circa 1620 by Paul Van Somer, National Portrait Gallery, London

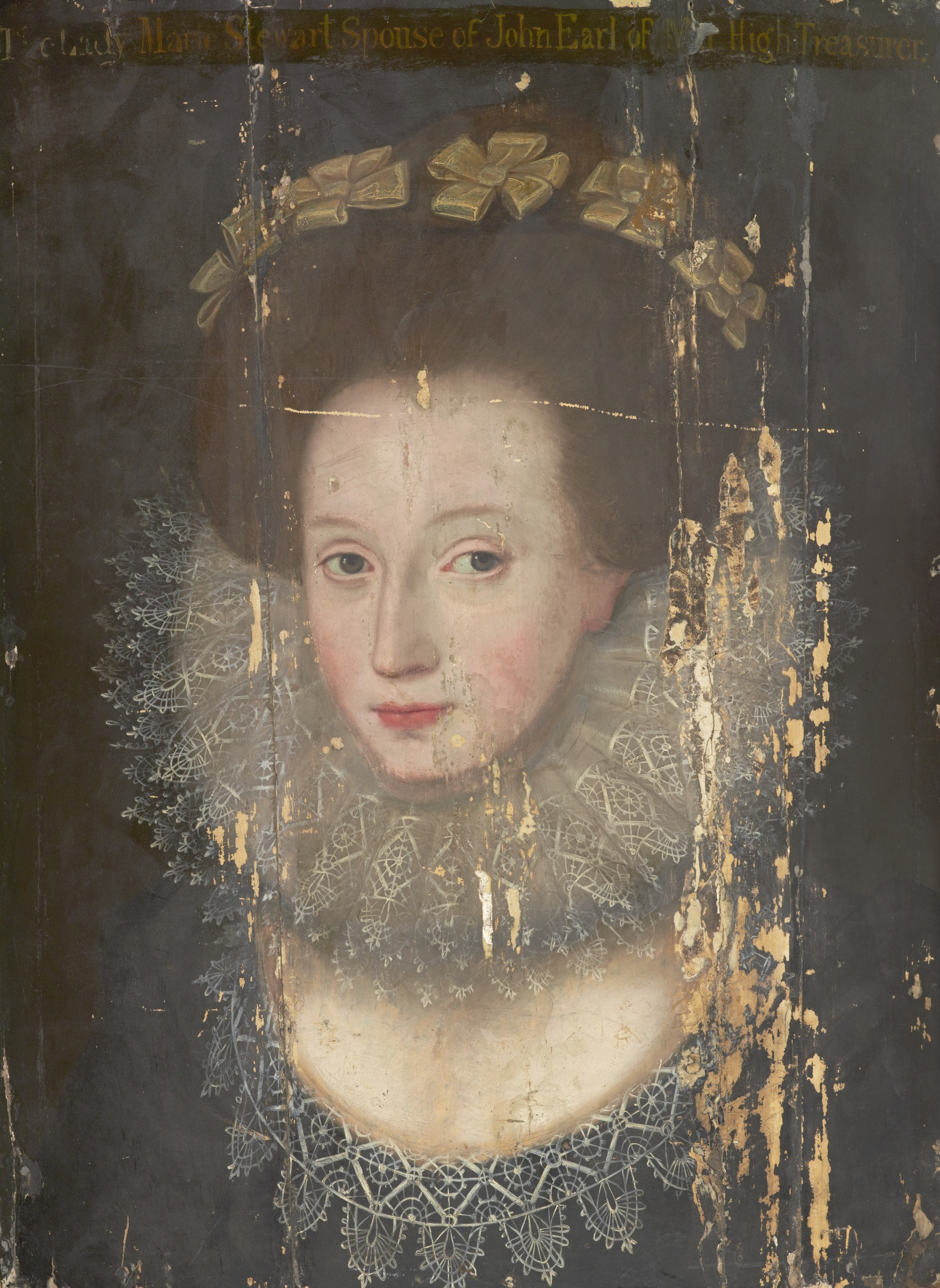
Ludovic Stewart's sister, Marie Stewart, Countess of Mar (died 1644),

Arms of Ludovic Stewart, 2nd Duke of Lennox and 1st Duke of Richmond: Quarterly of 4, 1&4: Arms awarded in 1427 by King Charles VII of France to Sir John Stewart of Darnley, 1st Seigneur d'Aubigny, 1st Seigneur de Concressault and 1st Comte d'Évreux, Constable of the Scottish Army in France: Royal arms of France within a bordure of Bonkyll, for the arms of the de Bonkyll family of Bonkyll Castle in Scotland (whose canting arms were three buckles), ancestors of Stewart of Bonkyll, ancestors of Stewart of Darnley, a junior line; 2&3: Stewart of Darnley: Arms of Stewart, Hereditary High Steward of Scotland, a bordure engrailed gules for difference; overall an inescutcheon of Lennox, Earl of Lennox, the heiress of whom was the wife of Sir John Stewart of Darnley

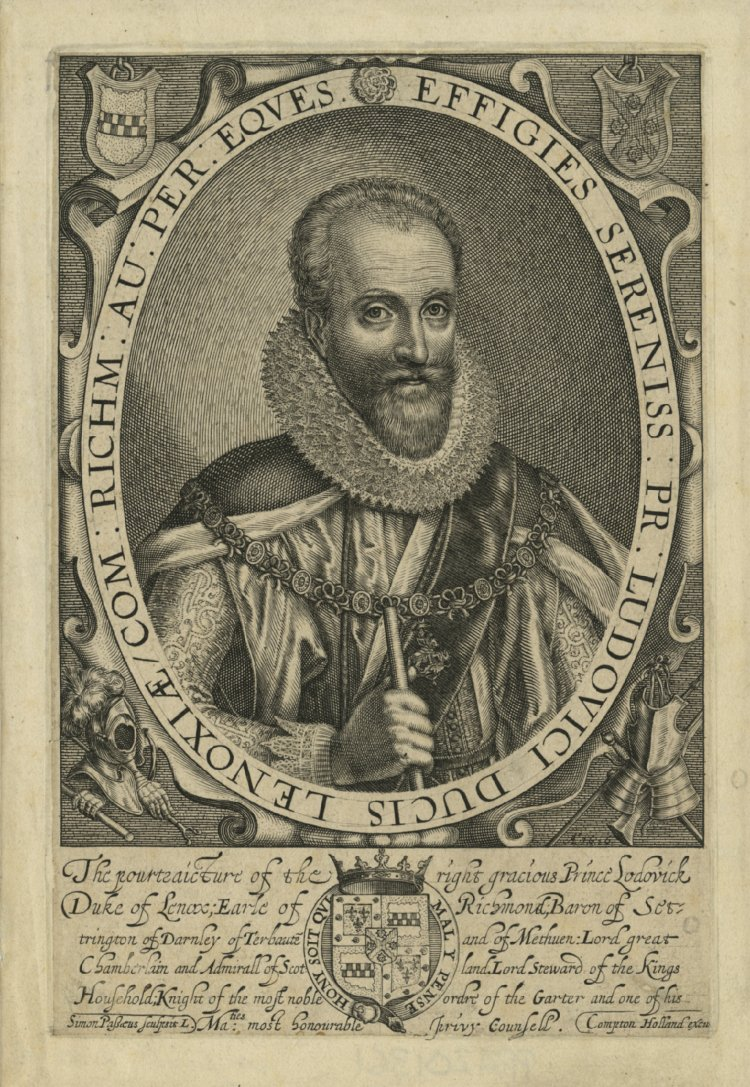
Portrait of Ludovic Stewart 2nd Duke of Lennox by Simon de Passe, c.1620-3

Ludovic Stewart, 2nd Duke of Lennox and 1st Duke of Richmond (29 September 1574 – 16 February 1624) was a Scottish nobleman and a second cousin of King James VI and I. He was involved in court theatre and the Plantation of Ulster in Ireland and the colonisation of Maine in New England. Richmond's Island and Cape Richmond as well as Richmond, Maine (formerly Fort Richmond), are named after him. His magnificent monument with effigies survives in Westminster Abbey.

== Origins ==
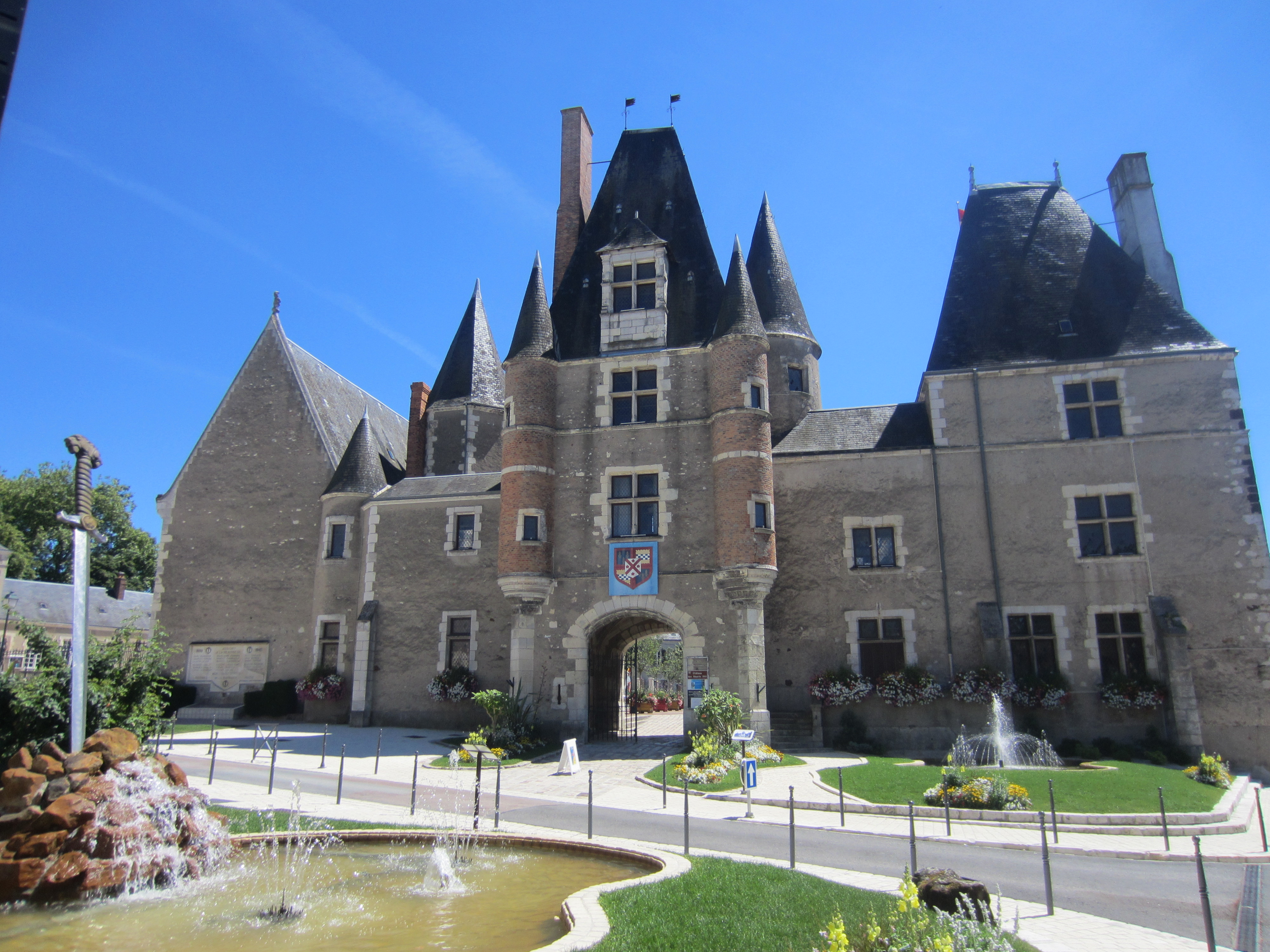
The Château d'Aubigny-sur-Nère, paternal home of Esmé Stewart, 1st Duke of Lennox, 1st Earl of Lennox. Built by Sir Robert Stewart, 4th Seigneur d'Aubigny (c.1470–1544) and known to the French today as le château des Stuarts

He was the eldest son of Esmé Stewart, 1st Duke of Lennox (1542-1583), a Frenchman of Scottish ancestry, by his wife Catherine de Balsac (1547 - 1631), a daughter of Guillaume de Balsac, Sieur d'Entragues, by his wife Louise d'Humières. Ludovic's father was a favourite and first cousin once removed of King James VI (the King's father Henry Stewart, Lord Darnley having been Esmé's first cousin). Ludovic was therefore himself a second cousin to the King.

== Career ==
=== Scotland ===
On 14 November 1583, after the death of his father, he returned from France and was taken to meet King James VI of Scotland at Kinneil House. He had surrendered the Seigneurie d'Aubigny to his younger brother, Esmé. Later in that month, the Earl of Arran installed him in Holyrood Palace, expelling Francis, Earl of Bothwell from his lodgings.

In December, the king issued instructions for Ludovic's education and placed him in the royal household under the care of Mr Gilbert Moncreiff. A French servant John Cavallione was to instruct him in boldity exercises and pastimes. On 23 December 1583 he was appointed as the High and Great Chamberlain of Scotland and first Gentleman of the King's Bedchamber, as his father had been, with Alexander Erskine of Gogar, Captain of Edinburgh Castle as his deputy. The role included taking oaths of fidelity to the King from the other officers, ushers, and varlets of the Bedchamber and Wardrobe.

Lennox bore the crown at the coronation of Anne of Denmark in St Giles, Edinburgh. On 4 October 1590 he played cards with the king for the stake of a new "black castor hat lined with velvet". James however became angry with Lennox because he wished to marry Lilias (or Sophie) Ruthven, a daughter of William Ruthven, 1st Earl of Gowrie. James wanted him to marry a daughter of the Earl of Morton or Arbella Stewart and had Lilias Ruthven shut up in Wemyss Castle. Despite this, Lennox rescued his bride from the castle and married her the next day. After 10 days the king's rage subsided and the couple were allowed to come to court. After the death of Lilias Ruthven in May 1592, the English diplomat Robert Bowes heard that the king often received Lennox in his bed when he was away from the court and his queen Anne of Denmark.

Robert Bowes, the English diplomat in Edinburgh, described a fight on Edinburgh's Royal Mile between Lennox and John Wemyss of Logie. Logie had upset or made Lennox jealous in an incident in the king's bed chamber. Bowes said the offence was Logie's "disobedience" to the Duke. Lennox confronted Logie on the street on 7 January 1591 and hit him on the head with his sword. King James, who was walking behind Logie, was dragged into a shop for safety. Lennox was commanded to leave the court for a while, for fighting near the king's person. The kirk minister Robert Bruce of Kinnaird spoke in his next sermon of the lack of reverence of the "men who troubled our causeway". Some further details were recorded by David Calderwood. In his version Logie's offence was to refuse to leave the bedchamber at Lennox's command, Alexander Lord Home helped Lennox attack Logie, and the king's refuge was a skinner's shop where he 'fylled his breeches for feare'. Soon after, Lennox was returned to court by the queen's intercession.

In 1591 he was appointed to the post of Lord High Admiral of Scotland following the disgrace of Francis Stewart, 5th Earl of Bothwell. On 18 October he was playing golf on the sands of Leith with the Earl of Huntly and they attempted to arrest Bothwell, who escaped, but Bothwell's horse "Valentine" was captured with Robert Scott brother of the Laird of Balwearie. Lennox arrested Michael Balfour of Burleigh and John Wemyss of Logie on 8 August 1592 on suspicion of conspiracy with Bothwell. They were interrogated at Dalkeith Palace. Burleigh was released and Logie escaped with the help of his Danish girlfriend Margaret Winstar.

On 13 February 1593 Lennox decided to play golf with Sir James Sandilands at Leith. On their way they met John Graham, a Lord of Session, who thought Sandilands was attacking him. They had a feud over land ownership. The two groups of attendants fired on each other with pistols and John Graham and Sir Alexander Stewart, a companion of the duke, were killed.

On 6 May 1593 the Duke and 15 friends subscribed to a frivolous legal document swearing to abstain from wearing gold and silver trimmings on their clothes for a year, and the defaulters were to pay for a banquet for all at John Kinloch's house. This "passement bond" was in part inspired by cheap counterfeit gold and silver thread used in "passements great or small, plain or à jour, bissets, lilykins, cordons, and fringes" which quickly discoloured. The signatories included Lord Home, the Earl of Mar, Lord Spynie, the Master of Glamis, Sir Thomas Erskine, Walter Stewart of Blantyre, Sir George Home, David Seton of Parbroath, and Sir William Keith of Delny.

As Great Admiral of Scotland, on 12 October 1593 Lennox gave Daniel Leyne a warrant to seize a ship captained by James Keeler of London, which was loading salt at Prestonpans. The ship was taken in recompense for the Bruce of Leith of George Bruce of Carnock, captured by English privateers off the coast of Spain. Soon after, as Lennox was now out of favour with James VI, he went to St Andrews in October 1593 and considered returning to France.

As the baptism of Prince Henry drew near, John Colville reported a rumour at the Scottish court that James VI had conceived jealousy against Anne of Denmark, and even thought that Lennox might be the father of Prince Henry. This disagreement was probably part of a wider factional struggle. Lennox remained in the king's favour, and at the tournament at Prince Henry's baptism in August 1594 Lennox rode in a Turkish costume.

Lennox was made the King's Lieutenant of the North, and took a force to the north of Scotland against the Earls of Huntly and Erroll. The castles of Ruthven in Badenoch and Inverness surrendered to him, and he held justice courts in Elgin. The wages of his soldiers were paid from money given by Queen Elizabeth I to James VI. He ordered his sister the Countess of Huntly and the Countess of Erroll to go the court of James VI. On 8 February 1595 he came to Aberdeen, and was made a burgess of the town at the Mercat Cross. Several members of his retinue were also made burgesses, including Sir Robert Melville of Murdocairny and David Moysie secretary-depute to the king. When his horse was sick, Lennox wrote to the Laird of Kilravock to borrow his "black hackney nag".

As a New Year's day gift in 1596 James VI give him a jewel with a crown set with diamonds worth 90 crowns. In March 1597 James VI allowed Adam Bruntfield and James Carmichael, son of Sir John Carmichael, to fight in single combat on Cramond Island, or the nearby Links of Barnbougle, because Bruntfield accused Carmichael of killing his brother, Stephen Bruntfield, Captain of Tantallon, in treasonous circumstances. Lennox went to the island to be the judge of their fight with the Laird of Buccleuch and Sir James Sandilands. They wore lightweight clothes of satin and taffeta, one in blue, and one in red. Bruntfield killed Carmichael. There were said to be 5,000 spectators.

Lennox hosted a banquet for the Duke of Holstein, brother of Anna of Denmark, on 25 May 1598. Lennox joined with the "Gentleman Adventurers of Fife" in a controversial project to resettle the Isle of Lewis. The king gave him the title Lieutenant within the bounds of Lewis, Ronalewis, and Trouternes. Lennox intended to go to Lewis in October 1598, and in December he was at the Bog o'Gight with the Earl of Huntly and planning to go to Lewis when the other adventurers or Lewisers arrived there.

=== England ===
Following his accession to the English throne in 1603, King James (now also known as James I of England) asked Lennox to accompany him to London. Lennox gained further English titles as Lord Settrington and Earl of Richmond (1613), and Earl of Newcastle and Duke of Richmond (1623).

The French diplomat Maximilien de Béthune, Duke of Sully came to London in 1603 and observed factions among the courtiers. Lennox and his followers differed from a Scottish bedchamber group which included the Earl of Mar, Edward Bruce, and Sir Thomas Erskine. Sully thought both groups were favourable to alliance with France, but Lennox's faction envied the influence of the bedchamber Scots. Sully gave Lennox a hatband set with diamonds.

King James was displeased with Lennox in June 1603 over the management of Anne of Denmark's business. He felt that Lennox should have persuaded her not to appoint one Kennedy as her chamberlain, when he preferred George Carew. The King objected to some of her other appointments and sent Lennox back to Scotland, where she remained, to amend matters. Lennox travelled with her to England. Her large crowd of followers was disorderly, and Lennox, with the Earls of Shrewsbury and Cumberland made a proclamation at Worksop Manor on 19 June that her followers should put aside any private quarrels, and hangers-on without formal roles should leave.

In November 1603 the Spanish ambassador, the Count of Villamediana, invited the Duke of Lennox and the Earl of Mar to dinner, and according to Arbella Stuart asked them "to bring the Scottish ladies for he was desirous to see some natural beauties". These included Jean Drummond and Anna Hay, with Elizabeth Carey. On 1 January 1604 Lennox organised and performed at Hampton Court in The Masque of Indian and China Knights.

Lennox was a conduit for patronage and court appointments, and those hoping to place their allies at court would solicit his favour. However, Lennox claimed that placing more Scottish people in the king's household had become difficult. He wrote to Sir William Livingstone of Kilsyth who had asked for a place for a Napier of Merchiston Castle;

"although the King has this long time promised Merchiston ever the next vacant place, yet many has been placed over him and in this has found great impediments; for believe that a stranger shall find great difficulty to obtain any such place so long as there is any English man that does aim at it; for it is thought by them all that there is already too many Scots here in such places."

He went as ambassador to France in January 1605. The mission was to return the compliment of the embassy of the Marquis de Rosny, who came to London in 1603. Lennox's cousin, the Marquise de Verneuil, was under house arrest in Paris, and was moved to different lodging far from the Duke's apartments. In July 1606 Lennox was sent to Gravesend to welcome Christian IV of Denmark and Norway, the younger brother of the queen Anne of Denmark, to England. His companions included Sir Robert Gordon of Gordonstoun. In August 1605 he joined the King and Queen at Drayton House in Northamptonshire.

=== New Draperies ===
In 1605 King James granted Lennox a patent for the "New Draperies" which had been resigned by Sir George Delves and William Fitzwilliam. He was much better placed than these men to exploit the grant and litigate with provincial traders and craftsmen. He employed the London lawyers Anthony Gibson and Richard Hadsor to uphold the rights of his agents in Norwich, who searched and checked textiles sent to London. In 1614 he extended his efforts to claim dues from stockings made in Richmond, Yorkshire. Several Members of Parliament protested against his exactions.

=== Scotland in 1607 ===
Lennox was in Scotland as High Commissioner of the Parliament from July 1607. His account of household expenses details his movements and the food he and his retainers consumed. He stayed at first at Holyrood Palace and his servant Walter Murray nailed his tapestries to the walls of his lodging. He also stayed in John Kinloch's house in Edinburgh. He spent time with Mary Ruthven, Countess of Atholl, a sister of his first wife, and gave her money. He visited St Andrews and was in Stirling with his daughter Elizabeth in November. His master cook William Murkie had worked for Anne of Denmark.

Lennox made a brief visit to Scotland in August 1616. He was escorting the Marquis of Huntly home.

=== England again ===
On 9 February 1608 he performed in the masque The Hue and Cry After Cupid at Whitehall Palace as a sign of the zodiac, to celebrate the wedding of John Ramsay, Viscount Haddington to Elizabeth Radclyffe.

Lennox acquired the royal patent to mint copper farthings in 1614, which he held until his death in 1624.

As part of the Plantation of Ulster, in 1608 Lennox was granted lands at Portlough in the Barony of Raphoe in County Donegal. The Pynnar Survey of 1618 records Lennox as the chief undertaker for 2,000 acres in the Portlough area and as represented locally by his agent Sir Aulant Aula. Newtownstewart in County Tyrone, now in Northern Ireland, may have been named after him. In the Muster Rolls of 1631, his nephew and eventual heir James Stewart, 1st Duke of Richmond, 4th Duke of Lennox is described as being an undertaker of 4,000 acres. Mongavlin Castle was built by his son Sir John Stewart, who was also Governor of Dumbarton Castle.

Ludovic was involved in the colonisation of Maine in New England, through his seat on the Plymouth Company. Richmond Island and Cape Richmond, as well as Richmond, Maine (formerly Fort Richmond), are named after him.

On 16 October 1612 Lennox was involved in welcoming the Palsgrave, Frederick V of the Palatinate, the husband-to-be of Princess Elizabeth. Lennox and ten other noblemen met him at Gravesend and brought him to London in a convoy of barges. They were met by the Duke of York on the Thames near the Tower of London. They alighted at Whitehall Palace and brought the Palsgrave into the royal presence in the Banqueting Hall.

In March 1614 thieves broke into his lodgings at Whitehall Palace and stole a gold collar set with pearls and diamonds worth £300, a silver warming pan, a silver inkstand, and some linen. A bed in his lodgings at the gatehouse of Whitehall Palace had belonged to "Lady Lennox", Margaret Douglas, Countess of Lennox, who had "worked" or embroidered the curtains.

On 20 May 1619, the Duke of Lennox hosted a feast in King's Great Chamber at Whitehall Palace. A supper of sweetmeats was served in glass bowls brought in on Chinese porcelain platters. The guests moved from the Great Hall to the Queen's Privy Chamber, where they heard the late Queen's French musicians sing, and in the Queen's bedchamber the Irish harp (played by Donell Dubh Ó Cathail), a viol, and Mr Lanier singing and playing on the lute. They returned to the Great Chamber for a performance of Shakespeare's Pericles, Prince of Tyre. In 1620, Lennox wrote to Sir Robert Gordon in Paris asking him to buy a dozen masks and a dozen gloves for gentlewomen, engaging the help of Madame de Gie and the Marquise de Vermont if possible.

== Marriages and family ==
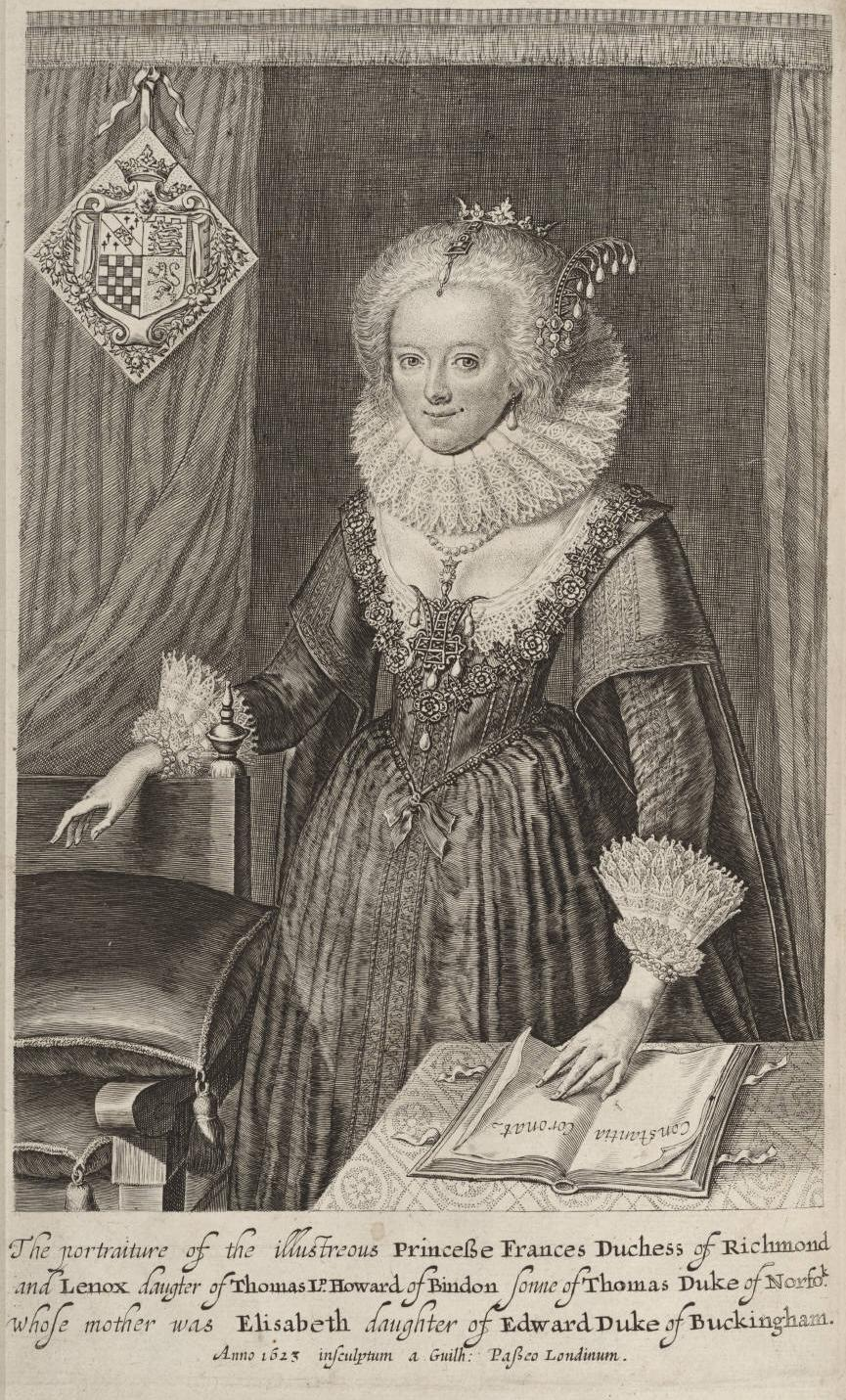
Frances Howard, Lennox's third wife

King James VI had discussed with Thomas Fowler the possibility of the Duke marrying Arbella Stuart, but the scheme was not proceeded with. He married three times.

- In April 1591, Lennox released Sophia Ruthven, a daughter of William Ruthven, 1st Earl of Gowrie and Dorothea Stewart, from Wemyss Castle and married her on 15 April 1591 (her age being around 16). She died in May 1592 and was buried in Trinity College Kirk in Edinburgh.
- On 3 September 1598, he married Jean Campbell, a great-granddaughter of King James IV of Scotland. The wedding banquet, attended by the king, was at Sorn Castle. Lennox wrote in April 1605 to William Livingstone of Kilsyth, who managed some of his Scottish estates, that he wished to "rid me of her" and "be quit of her." In December 1610 after Jean's death, her brother Hugh Campbell of Loudon complained that the Duke had taken her fine things to England, leaving her "drowned in great debt" with only an old silver basin, three little cups, and their children. They had a daughter, Lady Elizabeth Stewart. In September 1607 Lennox complained that Dame Jean Campbell kept Elizabeth away from him and also neglected her education.
- On 16 June 1621, he married Frances Howard, the daughter of Thomas Howard, 1st Viscount Howard of Bindon.

Lennox also had a son with a mistress whose name is unknown:

- Sir John Stewart of Methven, governor of Dumbarton Castle and builder of Mongavlin Castle.

== Death and burial ==
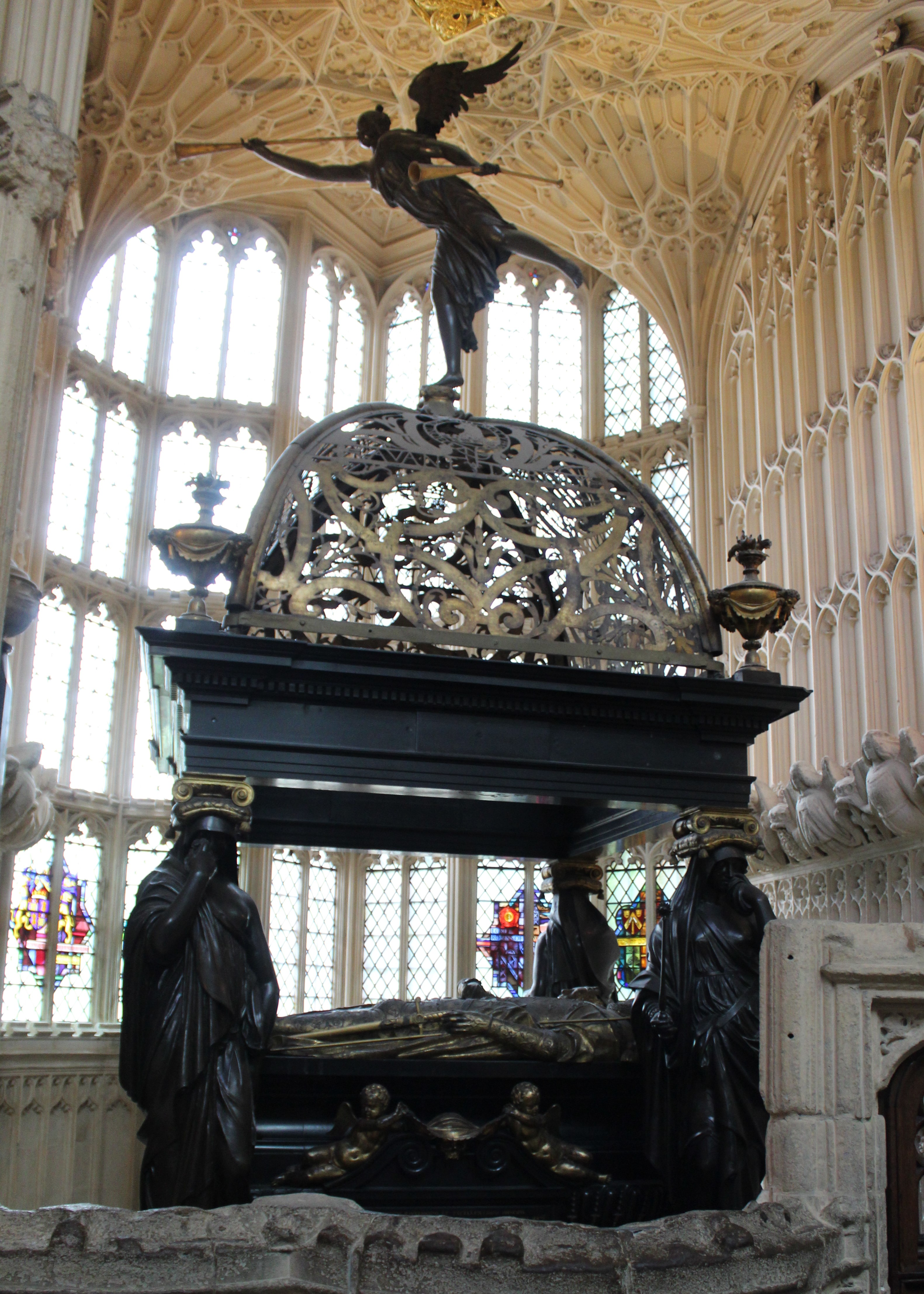
The Stewart family vault, Westminster Abbey

Stewart died suddenly in bed in his lodging at Whitehall Palace on the morning of 16 February 1624 aged 49 without a legitimate male issue. A funeral hearse with his effigy on a bed of state was displayed at Hatton House.

Stewart was buried in Westminster Abbey, in the Richmond Vault in the Henry VII Chapel (that king formerly having been Earl of Richmond) above which is his domed black marble monument by Hubert Le Sueur with gilt-bronze recumbent effigies of himself and his wife. The Latin inscription may be translated as follows:

Here lies the body of the most illustrious and most excellent prince, Ludovic, son of Esme Stuart, Duke of Lennox, grandson of John, nephew (sic, 2nd cousin) to the serene Prince King James I, Duke of Richmond and Lennox, Earl of Newcastle upon Tyne and Darnley, Chamberlain and Hereditary Admiral of Scotland, Lord High Steward of the Household, first Gentleman of the Bedchamber and Privy Counsellor to his sacred Majesty King James, Knight of the Garter, Ambassador from Scotland to France; a prince born to every thing that was great and good, but gone to far better. He lived 49 years, 4 months and 17 days. The most illustrious and most excellent princess Frances Duchess of Richmond and Lennox, daughter of Thomas Lord Howard of Bindon, son to the Duke of Norfolk by Elizabeth daughter of Edward, Duke of Buckingham, wife of Ludovic Stuart, Duke of Richmond and Lennox, who, ever mindful of this her dearest lord, hath to him who so well deserved it, and to herself, erected this monument. She died the 8th of October A.D. 1639.

The Latin of the Biblical quotation (2. Samuel 3, 38: "Know ye not that a prince and a great man is this day dead") contains a chronogram forming the Roman numerals of 1623 (old style, 1624 new style), the year of his death.

== Titles ==
On 6 October 1613 he was created Baron of Settrington (of Yorkshire) and Earl of Richmond (of Yorkshire), and on 17 May 1623 Earl of Newcastle-Upon-Tyne and Duke of Richmond. On his death the title of Duke of Richmond became extinct, but the paternal Scottish title of Duke of Lennox passed to his younger brother, Esmé Stewart, 3rd Duke of Lennox (1579−1624).

== See also ==
- Earl of Newcastle
- Plymouth Council for New England

Parliament of Scotland
Preceded by The Earl of Montrose	Lord High Commissioner; 1607–1609	Succeeded by The Earl Marischal
Political offices
Preceded by Sir Edward Hoby	Custos Rotulorum of Kent; 1617–1624	Succeeded by The Earl of Montgomery
Preceded by The Marquess of Buckingham	Lord Lieutenant of Kent; 1620–1624	Succeeded by The Earl of Montgomery
Peerage of Scotland
Preceded by Esmé Stewart	Duke of Lennox; 1583–1624	Succeeded by Esmé Stewart
Peerage of England
New creation	Duke of Richmond; 1623–1624	Extinct
