= Hallyards Castle =

Scottish ruins

Coordinates: 56°06′31″N 3°16′09″W

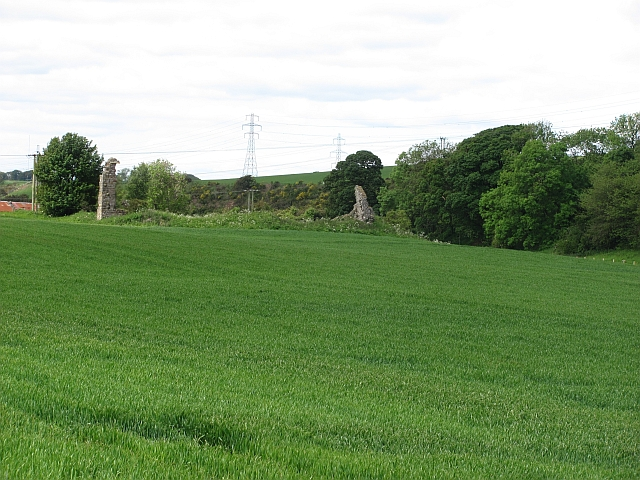
Ruins of Halyards Castle

Hallyards Castle or Halyards (Scots: Hall yairds "the yards at the hall"), located to the north-west of the village of Auchtertool, is reputed to have been a hunting seat of Malcolm Canmore.

== History ==
With the establishment of the Roman Church, Hallyards became the local residence of the Bishops of Dunkeld; it remained so until the first lay proprietor took possession in 1539.

The influence that Hallyards had on the district cannot be overstated. When James Kirkcaldy of Grange was proprietor the castle witnessed dramatic events; according to John Knox it was visited by James V just before his death, and the murder of Cardinal Beaton was possibly discussed within its walls

During the Reformation Crisis there was fighting between French troops and the Scottish Lords of the Congregation at Hallyards. William Kirkcaldy of Grange fought for the reformers, and was nearly betrayed at "Hawyairdeis". According to John Knox, after French troops blew up the house, Mary of Guise declared, "Where is now John Knox's God? My God is now stronger than his, yea, even in Fife". In February 1560, it was reported the castle was "clean overthrown". Kirkcaldy took his revenge on a Savoyard captain called Sebastian and his 50 French troops.

At Easter 1562, James Hamilton, 3rd Earl of Arran was confined by his father at Kinneil House. He escaped using a rope made from his bedsheets, and made his way across the Forth to Hallyards before meeting Mary, Queen of Scots, at Falkland Palace. During the rebellion known as the Chaseabout Raid, Mary and Lord Darnley ordered James Stewart, 1st Earl of Moray and William Kirkcaldy of Grange to surrender the Abbot's house at St. Andrews, Ballinbreich Castle, and Hallyards to their officers.

After the baptism of Prince James at Stirling Castle in December 1566, James Stewart, 1st Earl of Moray took the English ambassador the Earl of Bedford on a tour of Fife. They visited Hallyards. During the Marian Civil War, William Kirkcaldy of Grange became a supporter of the cause of Mary, Queen of Scots, and held Edinburgh Castle in her name. A Scottish chronicle, known as the Diurnal of Occurrents records that on 4 February 1572, James Douglas, 4th Earl of Morton, sent soldiers to destroy the house at Hallyards and the crops in the fields.

In later years Hallyards passed to John Boswell of Balmuto, to William Forbes of Craigievar, and members of the Skene family, and then to the Earls of Moray.

The castle's name was changed to Camilla, popularly held to be in honour of a countess who bore that name, though no so-named Countess of Moray is recorded. Camilla is the name more commonly known in Auchtertool today. Some writers state that a nearby water feature was called "Camilla Loch".

With the Earls of Moray living at a distance, Hallyards eventually fell into disuse. In 1819 the castle was revisited by a member of the Skene family, who found it in a dilapidated state. The great house was largely demolished in 1847. The remains can be found on farmland to the north-west of the village.

An article in the National asserted that the castle has a 1,000 year history. The site and its surroundings are the subject of a controversial planning application made in 2026 for a new hyperscale Cato data centre. The scheme is promoted by a Scottish-based energy investment company Intelligent Land Investments Group plc (ILI Group).

Another Hallyards Castle, near Kirkliston in West Lothian, was the focus of a feud which resulted in the shooting of John Graham, Lord Hallyards in February 1593.
