= Bridge Castle =

Castle in West Lothian, Scotland

Coordinates: 55.9200°N 3.6920°W

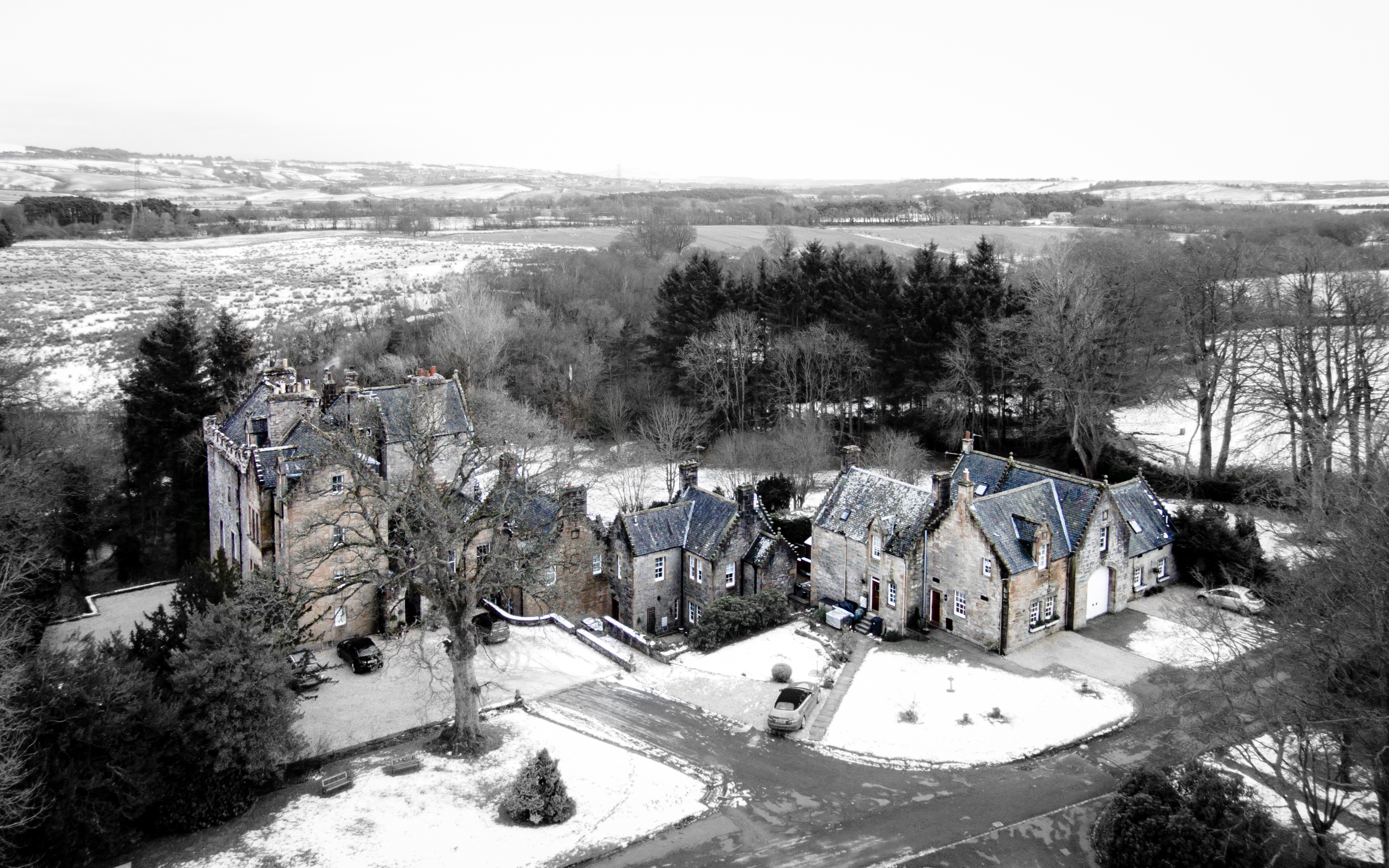
Aerial image of Bridge Castle taken on 3rd Feb 2015

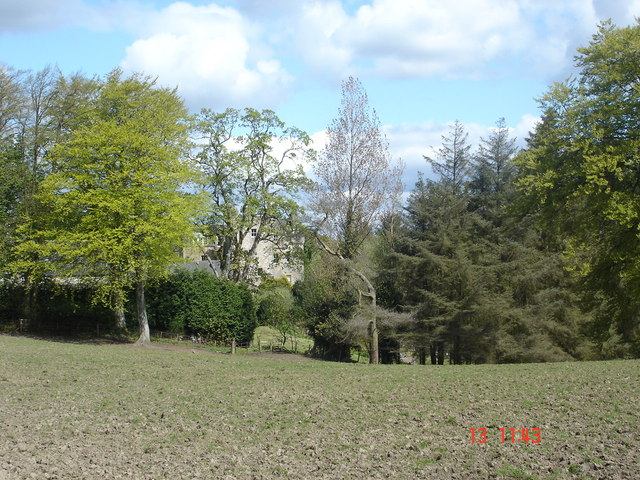
Bridge Castle in 2006, seen through trees

Bridge Castle is an L-plan castle, dating from the 16th century, standing on a rocky site 3 miles (4.8 km) north west of Bathgate in West Lothian, Scotland, on the west of the Barbauchlaw Burn. The former name of the castle was Little Brighouse.

== History ==
The castle was sold by Alexander Stewart of Scotstounhill to William Livingstone, 6th Lord Livingston in 1588. Lord Livingston probably added the castle wing. After the Livingstones supported the Jacobite rising of 1715 they forfeited their land and titles. The Hopes acquired the property which remains in their possession. The architect James Maitland Wardrop altered the property internally and enlarged it to form a Victorian mansion. The building was listed at category B in 1971, at which time it was a hotel.

== Structure ==
The castle was a rectangular building, three storeys and a garret high. A wing with crow-stepped gables was added to form the L-plan. The parapet of the original tower was bridged across a recessed lintel as link to the new wing. The first storey is vaulted, while other storeys have been modernised. There is a stair tower in the re-entrant angle, round, but corbelled to square above. There is a new entrance through a pedimented Gothic porch.
