= Staneyhill Tower =

17th-century tower house in West Lothian, Scotland

Coordinates: 55°59′27″N 3°27′27″W

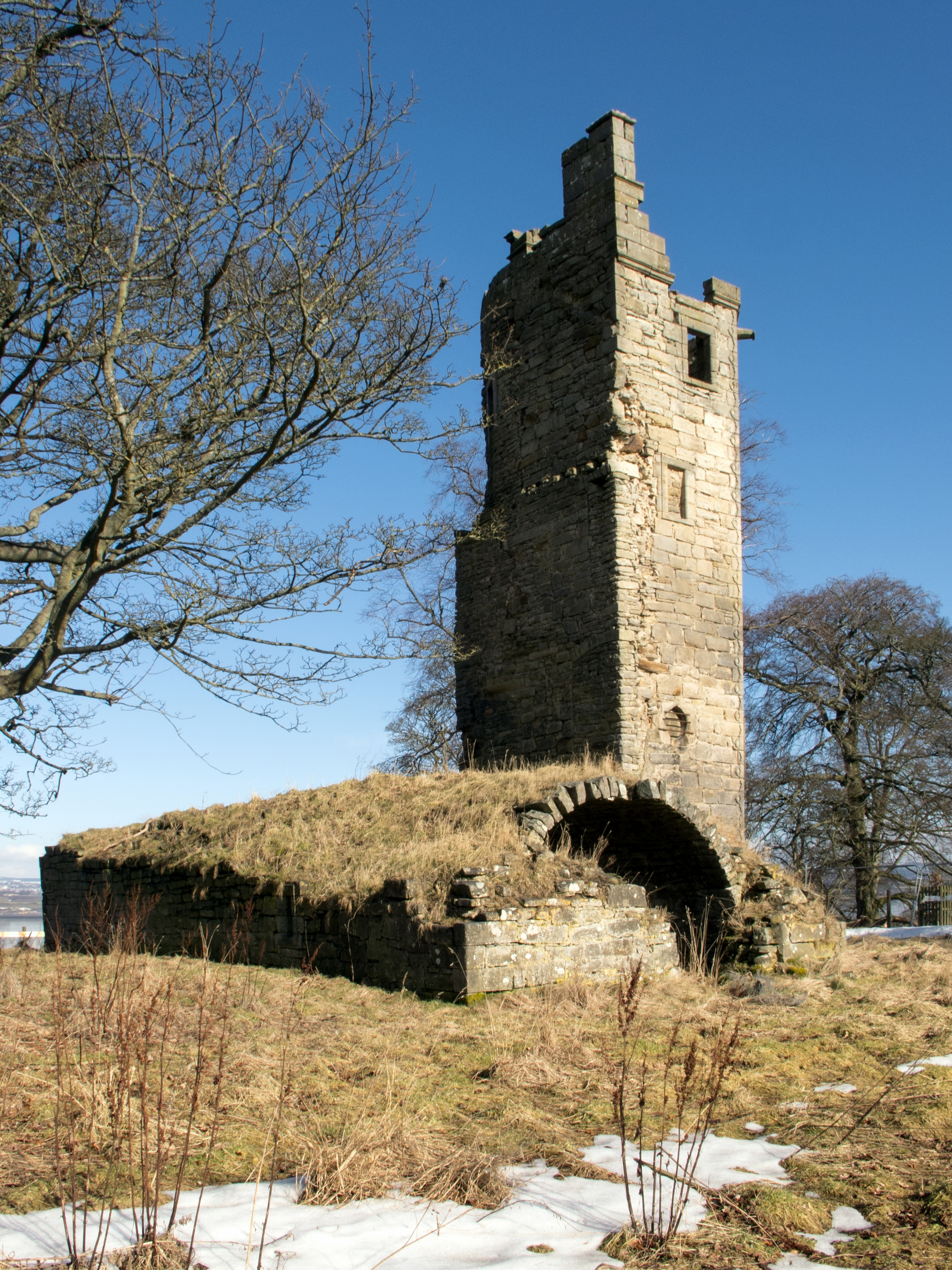
Staneyhill tower seen in 2018

Staneyhill Tower is a 17th-century tower house in West Lothian, Scotland. The tower is located to the southeast of Hopetoun House. It is a scheduled monument of national importance being the "remains of a 17th-century L-plan tower house which incorporates a particularly fine and unusual hexagonal tower". The building is said to provide important information about 17th-century domestic architecture. It is also said to be evidence of 17th-century court life in Scotland.

== Building ==
The building onsets primarily of a ruined octagonal stair tower that is built onto a L-plan structure. The walls and vaults of the ground floor also partially remain. It includes a "superb broken pedimented doorway of a highly fashionable house, possibly by Sir James Murray of Kilbaberton or William Ayton."

== History ==
The tower house was first erected circa 1630 for the Shairps family. William Sharp of Staneyhill was the brother of James Sharp, Archbishop of St Andrews, who was murdered by Covenanters in 1679. The site originally had a fine fountain which derived its water source from the nearby former Maggie's Loch which was drained in the 19th century. Waterpipes have been recovered during digging by farmers.

It had fallen out of use by the 18th century, coming under the ownership of the Earls of Hopetoun where many of its building materials were reused, potentially at Niddry Castle.

The site became a scheduled monument on 24 Oct 1935 and additional designation given on 9 Oct 1998.
