= Strathbrock Castle =

Castle, now destroyed in what is now West Lothian, Scotland

- Uphall, West Lothian, Scotland

Site information
- Condition: Ruined

Location
- Location in West Lothian, Scotland
- Coordinates: 55.9286°N 3.5099°W

Site history
- Built: c. 12th century
- Materials

Strathbrock Castle, Uphall, West Lothian, Scotland, was a motte-and-bailey castle. The castle was the caput of the barony of Strathbrock. The lands were given to Freskyn, a Flemish nobleman, by King David I of Scotland in the 12th century. The castle passed by marriage to the le Chen family. By 1435, the castle was in the hands of the Douglas family, and in 1524 the rector of Strathbrock Church lived there. The castle may have been a motte, with later stone buildings, and its remains were visible in the early 18th century. The area, to the south of Uphall's Main Street, is now built up.
