= Uphall railway station =

Railway station in West Lothian, Scotland

Uphall Scottish Gaelic: Ubhalaidh, Uphauch
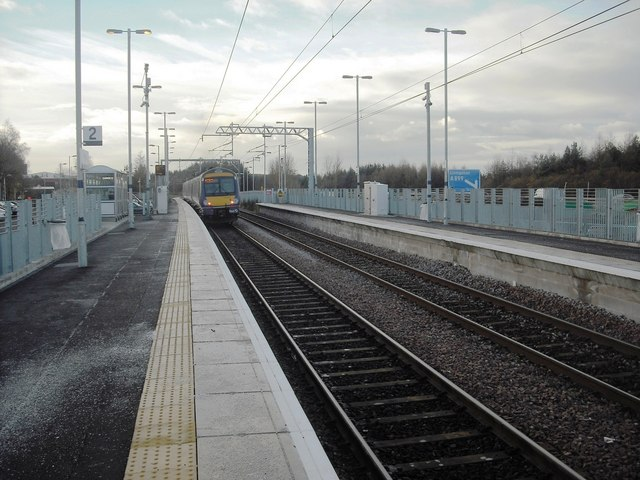

General information
- Location: Uphall Station, West Lothian; Scotland
- Coordinates: 55.9190°N 3.5022°W
- Grid reference: NT061705
- Managed by: ScotRail
- Platforms: 2

Other information
- Station code: UHA

History
- Original company: Edinburgh and Bathgate Railway
- Pre-grouping: North British Railway
- Post-grouping: London and North Eastern Railway

Key dates
- 12 November 1849: Opened as Houston
- 1 August 1865: Renamed Uphall
- 9 January 1956: Closed
- 24 March 1986: Reopened

Passengers
- 2020/21: ▼0.111 million
- 2021/22: ▲0.297 million
- 2022/23: ▲0.358 million
- 2023/24: ▲0.457 million
- 2024/25: ▲0.488 million
Location
Notes
- Passenger statistics from the Office of Rail and Road

Uphall railway station serves the village of Uphall Station and some areas of Livingston in West Lothian, Scotland. It is located on the North Clyde Line, 12½ miles (20 km) west of Edinburgh.

== History ==
The station was opened as Houston by the Edinburgh and Bathgate Railway on 12 November 1849. On 1 August 1856 it was renamed as Uphall. The station closed on 9 January 1956.

Uphall Station was a large hub, centred on West Lothian oil production and shale mining. The area has changed beyond recognition in recent years. Before the M8 was constructed, Uphall oil works lay just north of the station, with extensive exchange sidings located next to the station. A branch continued north to Uphall, then swung eastward just south of Ecclesmachan (where a branch from Threemiletown joined). The line continued to the Greendykes area of Broxburn, (Albyn or Albion Oil works) where it connected with the lines from Broxburn junction (Winchburgh) (the Broxburn Railway) and Drumshoreland.

Just to the east of the station lay Uphall Jct., connecting the Camps Branch. This line, 3 miles 52 chains (5.9 km) in length, began with a large set of exchange sidings adjacent to the E&B, and served various sidings, the Pumpherston Oil Co., East Calder and terminated at Raw Camps (Torrance's) quarry. The NBR Camps branch formed a junction with the Caledonian Camps branch at Camps Goods station. The course of these lines can be seen on Ordnance Survey Maps One-inch "Popular" edition.

Preceding station	National Rail	Following station
Edinburgh Park	ScotRail; North Clyde Line	Livingston North
	Historical railways	
Drumshoreland; Line open; station closed	North British Railway; Edinburgh and Bathgate Railway	Dechmont; Line and station closed
Drumshoreland; Line open; station closed	North British Railway; Edinburgh and Bathgate Railway	Livingston; Line open; station closed

== Reopening ==
The station's reopening, with a single platform, came as part of the reopening of the Edinburgh–Bathgate line on 24 March 1986. Ever since, train services at Uphall were normally operated by diesel multiple units (initially Class 101s, then from 1987 Class 150s and by 2008 Class 158 or Class 170s). The station was reopened by British Rail.

The railway was electrified in October 2010 as part of the Airdrie–Bathgate rail link, which resulted in a second platform being brought into service in October 2008. As of December 2010, all trains on the Uphall station line are electrified with passenger usage increasing dramatically due to the reliability of the trains, increased frequency (every 15 minutes Monday - Saturday during peak times) and the short journey times (15–20 minutes into the centre of Edinburgh).

== Service ==
=== Winter 2010/11 (From 12 December 2010) ===
During the week there is an eastbound service to Edinburgh every 15 minutes which takes between 15 and 20 minutes to reach the centre of Edinburgh and 10 minutes to reach Edinburgh Park. An westbound service of two trains per hour to Milngavie and two trains per hour to Helensburgh Central, both via Glasgow operates 6 days a week as well (half hourly to Helensburgh only in the evening and on Sunday). The early morning commuter trains to Edinburgh are exceptionally popular to such an extent there is commonly no available parking at the station after 8.30am, this has pushed house prices within walking of the distance of the rail station up in recent years as passenger numbers have grown by around 35-40% a year to an estimated 600,000 in 2013/14.

The station has shelter and a ticket machine, no ticket barriers.

=== Access ===
A car parking area is located to the north and south of the station.

The only access between platforms is by public footway beyond either end of the station. At the eastern end this is via an underpass. The walking time between platforms, or between eastbound platform and car park is around 2 minutes.
