= Murieston Castle =

Ruined tower house in West Lothian, Scotland

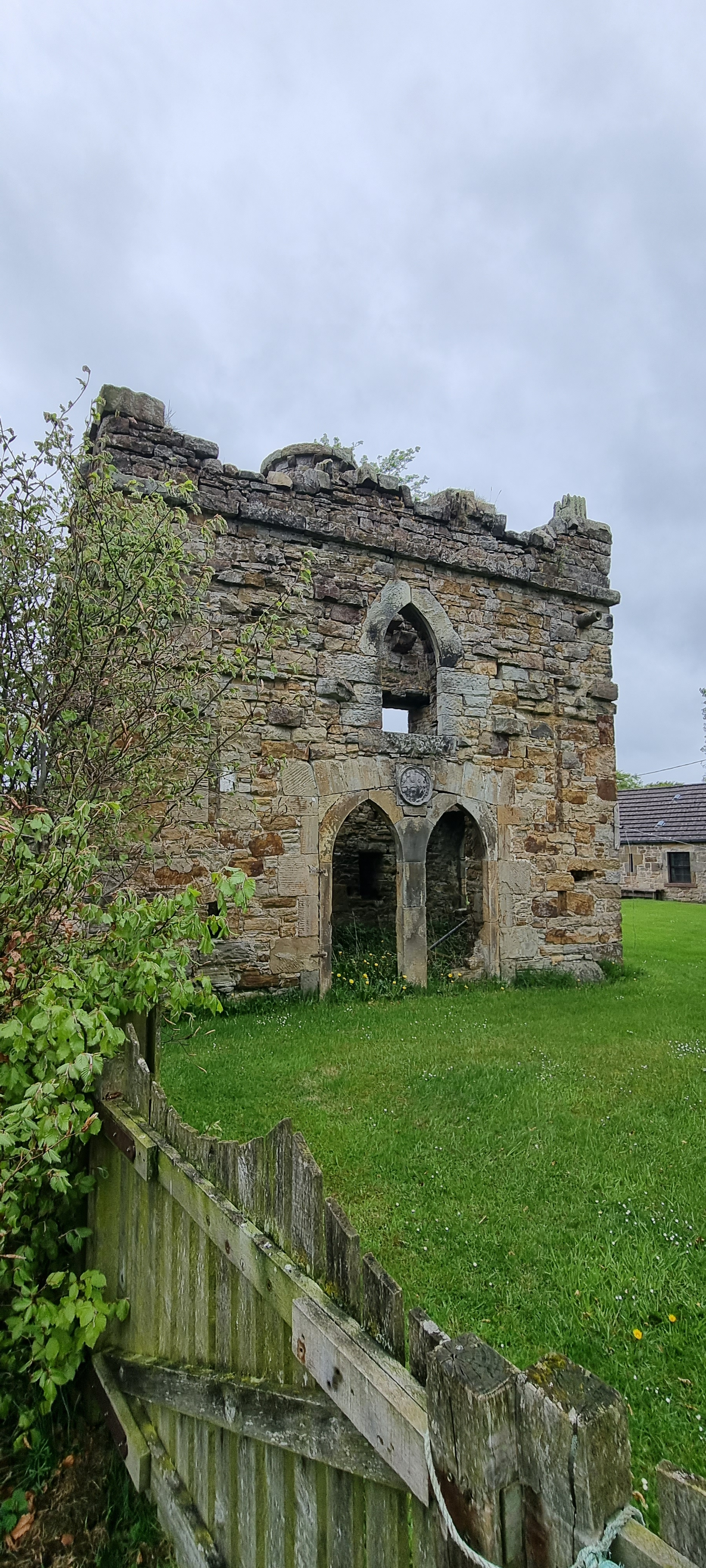

Location
- Coordinates: 55.8552°N 3.5190°W

Site history
- Built: 16th century

Murieston Castle is a ruined tower house, dating from the 16th century, 2 miles (3.2 km) west of West Calder, west of the Murieston Water, at Murieston Castle Farm, West Lothian, Scotland. It is a scheduled monument and between 1971 and 2018 it was a Category B listed building.

== History ==
Murieston Castle had become ruinous by the early 19th century when it was restored around 1824. It has been described as being over-restored, and having the character of a folly. The restoration was for John Keir who bought Wester Murieston in 1819.

== Structure ==
The castle was oblong, the walls being of rubble, two storeys high. At first-floor level there is a roofless turret, corbelled out in the original building. The tower is about seven metres (23 ft) long, running north-west to south-east, and five metres (16 ft) broad. The ground-floor interior has been gutted and it has an earthen floor. There is a fore-stair to the upper storey. A double doorway carries a medallion with arms in spandrel, dated 1824.
