= Pumpherston =

Coordinates: 55.906°N 3.486°W

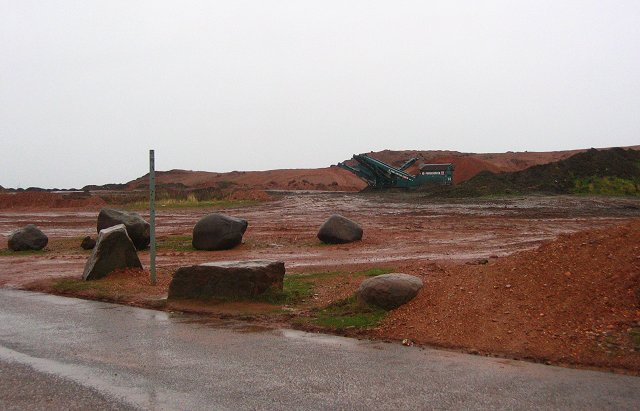
- The last remains of a shale bing by Pumpherston

- Location within West Lothian
- OS grid reference: NT071690
- Civil parish: Mid Calder
- Council area: West Lothian
- Lieutenancy area: West Lothian
- Country: Scotland
- Sovereign state: United Kingdom
- Post town: LIVINGSTON
- Postcode district: EH53
- Dialling code: 01506
- Police: Scotland
- Fire: Scottish
- Ambulance: Scottish
- UK Parliament: Livingston
- Scottish Parliament: Almond Valley

Pumpherston is a village in West Lothian, Scotland. Originally a small industrial village housing works for the nearby shale mine and works, it now forms the eastern part of the new town of Livingston, which was constructed to the west of Pumpherston in the late 1960s and quickly grew to incorporate Pumpherston in its wider urban settlement, as defined by the General Register Office for Scotland (GROS). The village of Uphall Station lies immediately to the north. It is twinned with the village of Mtarfa, Malta.

== History ==
In 1884 the Pumpherston Oil Works was built to extract and product shale oil and the village developed adjacent to the works to house employed staff and their families. Pumpherston was initially divided into two villages, south and north. The north village had 116 homes and a co-operative store by 1885. By 1888, the south village had forty four cottages in four parallel rows and a terrace of four larger houses facing Uphall Station Road. By 1914, Pumpherston north village had continued to expand to over 220 houses, as well as a workingmans institute, library, hall and bowling green. The co-operative store building (West Calder Co-Operative) still occupies the corner site in the village and includes a clock tower.

The Pumpherston oil works was later merged into Scottish Oils Ltd, established by Anglo-Persian in 1919 along with four other Scottish oil shale companies (Young's Paraffin Light & Mineral Oil Company, Broxburn Oil Company, Oakbank Oil Company and James Ross & Company Philpstoun Oil Works). The oil works however continued to grow as the principal refinery for the company, with the additions of a cracking plant, brickworks and a detergent plant. The main refinery closed in 1964 although the detergent plant continued to operate until the earlier 1990s. Most of the former workings have been removed and the area has now been redeveloped as a golf course and new housing.

The specific oil shale retort, invented in 1894 and marking the separation of the oil shale industry from the coal industry, is named after the village.

== Origin of the name ==
There does not seem to be an unambiguous derivation for the origin of the name:

Various suggestions have been made as to the meaning of the name Pumpherston. One writer suggested it was from 'pamper', a short thickset man; another suggested it was from 'pundler', the official in the middle ages who impounded stray cattle. [A more likely] derivation is from [Brythonic] 'ap Humphrey' meaning son of Humphrey.

Pomphray was probably [the name of] one of the Flemish (Belgian) noblemen invited by King David I and his grandson Malcolm IV to settle in Scotland in the twelfth century ... Pomphray would have been granted the lands north of the Almond in return for serving the king in battle ... around the castle built by Pomphray, probably a wooden structure later replaced by a stone building, would have grown up a little settlement and farm to house and feed his adherents and servants - Pomphray's town.

Manu de Pomphray was a Belgian mercenary who was rewarded for his "deeds" by King Malcolm circa 1130-1145

—Sybil Cavanagh et al.

== Archaeology ==
There is evidence of the Roman occupation approximately two miles north east of Pumpherston - at Roman Camp, near Broxburn.

== Amenities ==
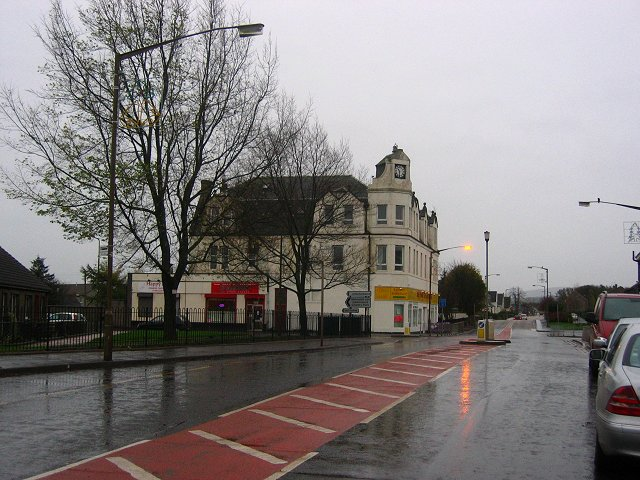
The corner of Pumpherston road and Drumshoreland road

Pumpherston shares a primary school, Pumpherston & Uphall Station Community Primary School, with near neighbour Uphall Station. For secondary education is provided at nearby Broxburn Academy.

Pumpherston has a variety of sporting amenities including Pumpherston Golf Club, Pumpherston Bowling Club and Recreation Park, the home of Pumpherston Juniors Football Club (Pumpherston F.C.).

In 2005 Pumpherston United F.C was formed to provide an opportunity for children from Pumpherston and the surrounding areas to take part in regular sporting activities. In only its third year the youth football club achieved an Access Level Award through West Lothian Council's Community Sports Club Development Scheme. The certificate awarded to the club confirms that Pumpherston United F.C demonstrates appropriate levels of efficiency in Child Protection, Good Coaching Practice, Club Management and First Aid.

"Dukla Pumpherston" is a charity football team that originates from a fictional football team used by the comedian Tony Roper in the 1980s for the Naked Radio show. The name "Dukla Pumpherston" is said to originate from a play entitled "The Broons" held in Pumpherston Scout Hall circa 1982. However, the team now play to raise funds and awareness for various charities.

== Transport ==
Uphall Station road is the main road through the village. The nearest railway station is Uphall railway station which lies to the north of Pumpherston at Uphall Station village.

Lothian Country operate bus service 72 between Fauldhouse & Kirkliston via Whitburn, Livingston, Broxburn & Winchburgh calling at the town.

== Music ==
Kerry McGregor, who had success with many ventures including the Eurovision Song Contest qualifiers and X Factor, as well as acting, came from Pumpherston.
