= Illieston House =

Castle in West Lothian, Scotland

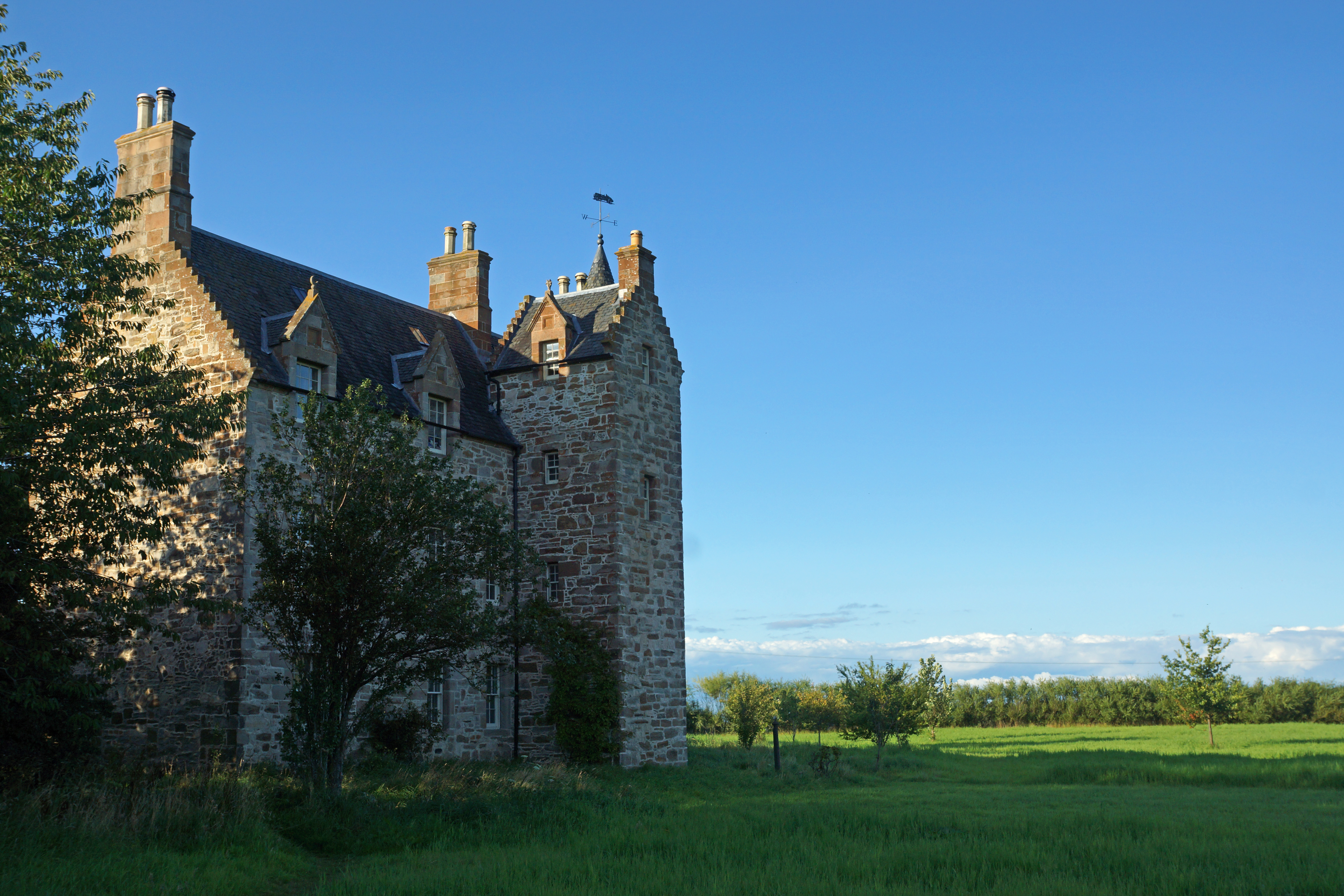
- Illieston House (2017)

- Location within West Lothian
- 55.914527°N 3.439944°W
- OS grid reference: NT 10086 69981

History
- Built: c. 1600

Site notes
- Restored: c. 1856
- Restored by: William Burn

Listed Building – Category B
- Official name: Illieston House (Elliston)
- Designated: 22 February 1971
- Reference no.: LB7436

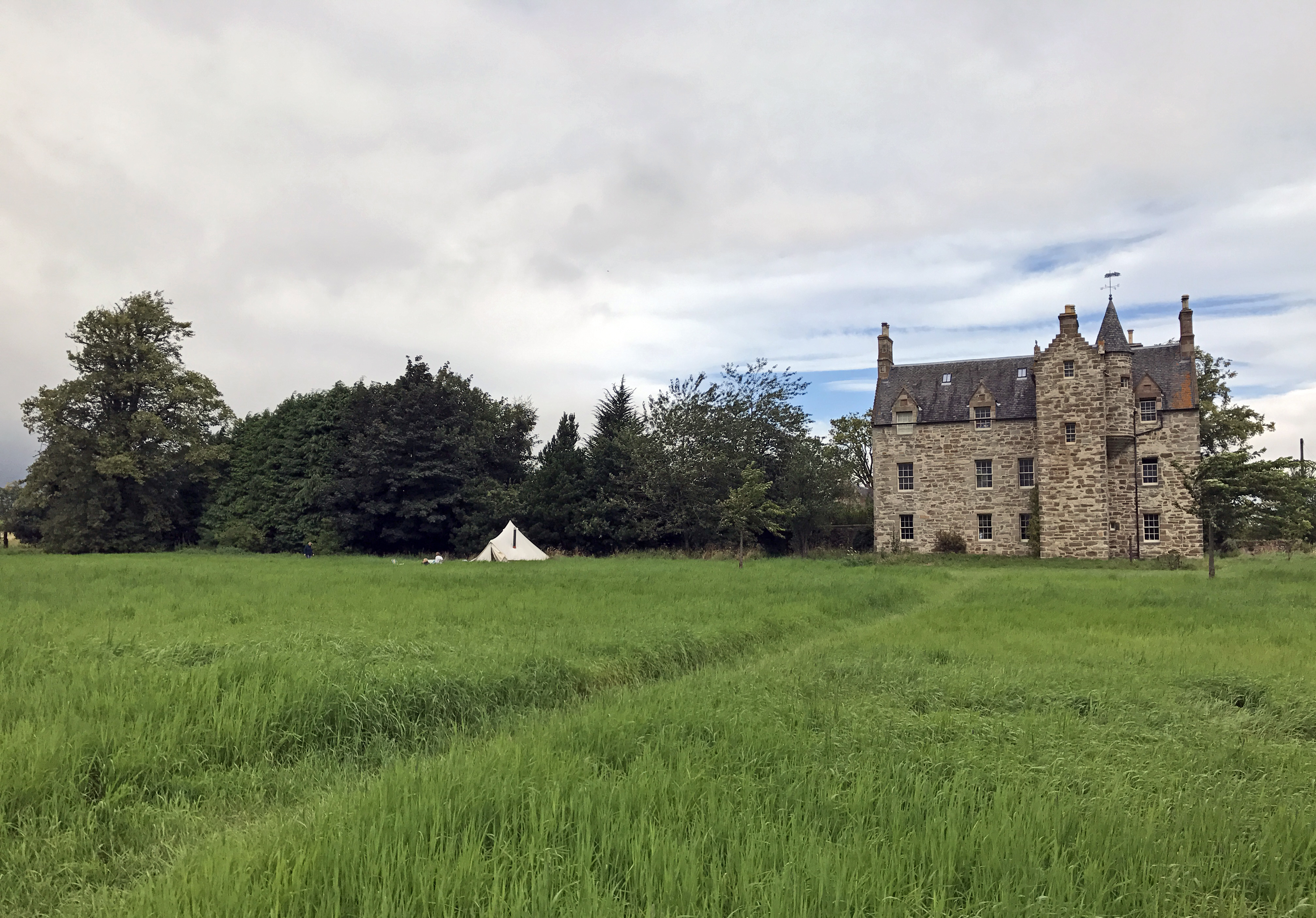
View of the castle and its grounds in 2017.

Illieston House, also known as Illieston Castle, is a castle located in West Lothian, Scotland, by the River Almond near Broxburn. It was built around 1600 and features a T-plan design with gabled dormers and a staircase tower. Over its history, it underwent modifications and restorations, including additions such as a new kitchen wing and modern interior amenities. It has changed ownership several times and it was renovated in 1856 by architect William Burn and underwent modernization in the 21st century. Listed as a Category B building in 1971, it attracted media attention for its sale in 2018.

== Description ==
The castle was originally a T-plan design, 2 storeys tall, with an attic, slated roof, and an additional kitchen wing which has since been demolished. It has gabled dormers, and a staircase tower on the south side that runs the full height of the main building. There is an additional corbelled out stair-turret from the 2nd storey leading to a watch-chamber at the top of the main staircase tower.

The modern interior includes four bedrooms and three reception rooms over three levels, plus a 2.8-by-2.65-metre (9 ft 2 in by 8 ft 8 in) room within the turret. A new kitchen wing includes a separate laundry room and small lobby, beside a walled garden. The castle also has a biomass boiler.

== History ==
=== Origins to 18th century ===
The Stewart kings James II and James IV are said to have had a hunting lodge at Illieston. The castle was built on the slopes of the River Almond some time around 1600. It was acquired by John Ellis in 1663 or 1664, who added a gateway inscribed with his initials in 1665. The name Illieston may be a variation on the name Elliston.

The 17th-century lawyer John Lauder of Fountainhall described the house in 1668, referring to it as "Hyliston". He mentions that the Hamilton family were the previous owners. They had been Catholics and had a chamber for a priest. The house was strongly built, with a kitchen on the ground floor and a hall on the first floor hung with tapestry. Lauder heard that James VI of Scotland had advanced 20,000 merks towards the cost of building the house, as it suited his hunting on nearby Drumshorling moor. Some of the window shutters had the carved dates 1613 or 1614.

John Ellis had obtained his first charter of Illieston during the years of the British Interregnum, so the Hamilton family were able to claim the property back under the Scottish feudal laws of non-entry, which allowed a landlord to take possession of land if the tenant died without an heir or if the heir failed to claim their right to the land within a certain time frame. According to John Lauder, John Ellis's son-in-law, the lawyer and author James Anderson, helped the Hamiltons regain the property for "filthy lucre" after the Ellis heir died in 1686. The castle passed back to the Hamilton family in 1693, and to James Hope-Johnstone, 3rd Earl of Hopetoun in 1765.

In July 1697 the wife of Lumsden of Innergellie, along with a few others, was reported to have broken into the house, breaking windows and doors, and turning loose cattle to cause further damage. She was put on trial in August that year but did not appear. Two of her accomplices were ordered to pay a hundred pounds Scots as damages, and that she "be confined (if caught) until that sum was paid".

=== 19th to 21st century ===
Illieston House fell into disrepair but was restored by architect William Burn around 1856.

In 1950 it was bought by the Brownlee family to use as a private residence, and as of 2017 they still farmed the surrounding land. It became a Category B listed building in 1971, which provided it with statutory protection. The building was bought by Nicholas Schellenber in 2007, who modernised the property. Schellenber also experimented with solar panels. Part of it was rented out on Airbnb and then listed for sale by 2018, which attracted some media attention as one of the most expensive West Lothian properties in recent years. It sold for £890,000 in 2019 (equivalent to £1,140,244 in 2025) including approximately 20 acres (8.1 ha) of land and separate bothy.
