= Calder House =

Category A listed building; historic Scottish country house

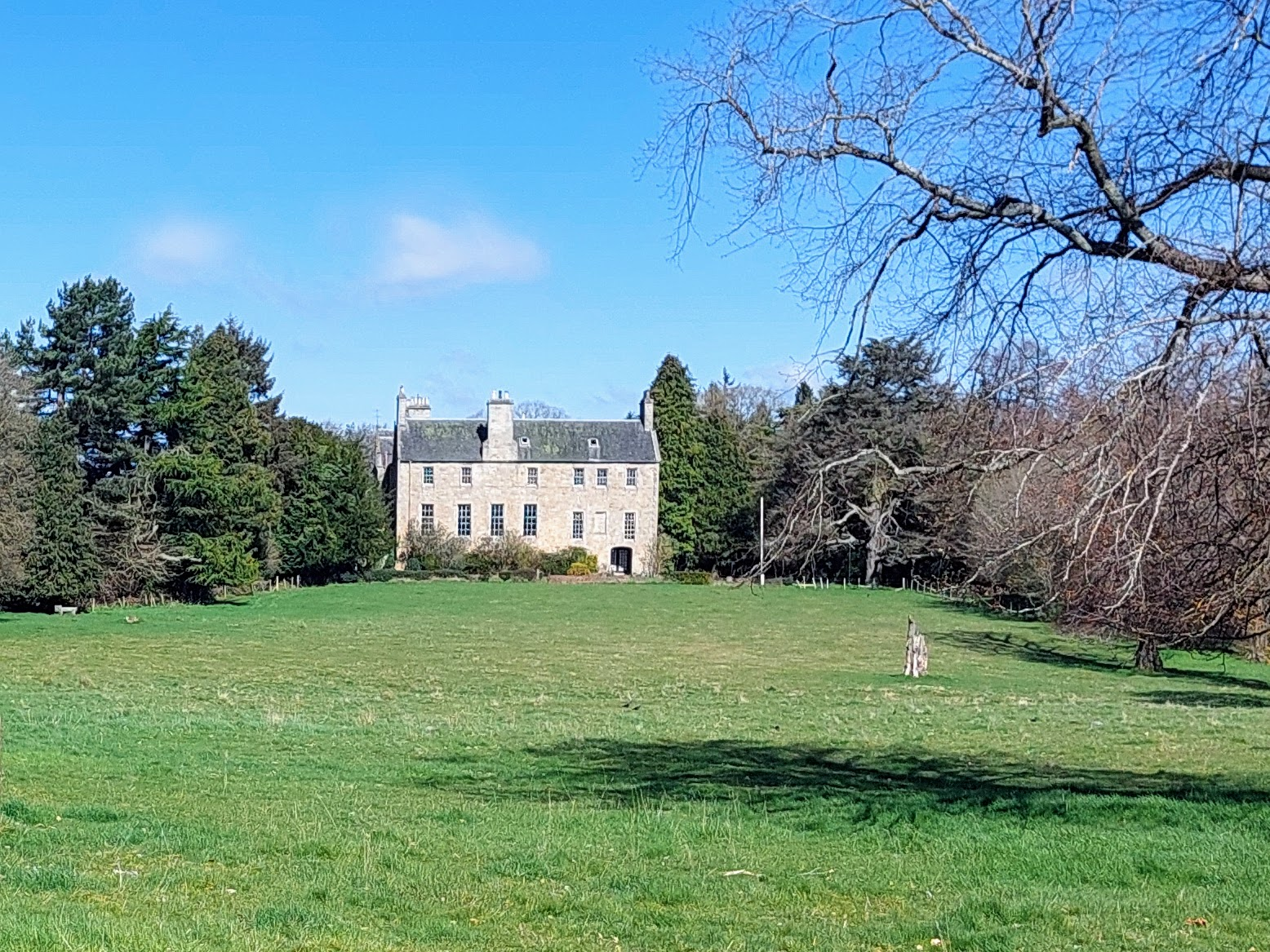
- Front facade of Calder House

- Location in West Lothian
- 55.8895°N 3.4843°W
- Location: West Lothian, Scotland, UK

History
- Built: c. 1560
- Built for: Sir James Sandilands

Site notes
- Owner: Sandilands family

Listed Building – Category A
- Designated: 22 February 1971
- Reference no.: LB14153

Calder House is a historic Scottish country house in Mid Calder, Scotland, the family seat of the Sandilands family since 1348, and deemed to be one of the great Renaissance houses of Scotland.

== History ==
Calder House is located within the historical barony of Calder, adjacent the Kirk of Calder. Known as Calder Comitis, meaning "Earl's Calder", this covered the lands of Mid and West Calder which were originally possession of the Thanes (Earls) of Fife, the Douglas family. In 1348, upon the marriage of Eleanor Douglas, daughter of Sir Archibald Douglas to Sir James de Sandilands, the entire Barony was granted as a wedding gift to the Sandilands family.

In the 1560s, their descendant Sir James Sandilands was made the First Lord Torphichen by Mary Queen of Scots, commissioning the construction of a stately Mansion House on his lands. As a result, the current form of the house dates principally from this period, as attested by a drawing by Timothy Pont from around 1590. It has remained the family seat of the Sandilands Clan ever since.

== Architecture ==
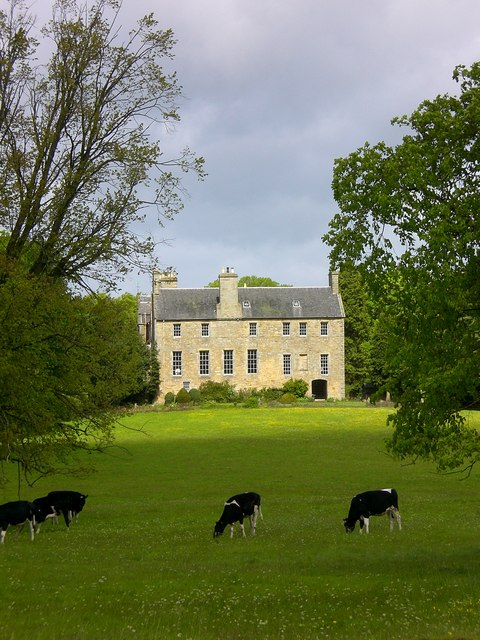
Calder House, Caladar Meadhanach

Much of the present Calder House dates to the mid-16th century, and is built in a traditional L-plan form, with a main block three-storeys high. The massively thick walls are up to 8 feet (2.4 m), suggesting that this mansion house incorporates the walls of earlier fortalice/castle, and are constructed with random rubble. The end walls are gabled, and the roof is slated.

The north wing is four-storeys high, and was extended in the later 17th century, with further additions made c. 1780, 1820, and in 1880, in the re-entrant angle and on the west side of the wing.

The interior although greatly altered, exhibits three contiguous vaulted chambers in older part of first storey of main block, a drawing room (previously great hall) in the second floor with pine paneling and tall windows, a kitchen, and a fine scale-and-platt stair in wing.

== Notable Features ==
Calder House features a number of Gateways and Gate-lodge buildings scattered around the village, notably on Bank Street and Main Street.

It also incorporates a traditional brick-built 'cup and dome' Icehouse, dug into the North slope of the hill close by the House itself.

The East approach used to include the famous local landmark the "Dry Brig" (Dry Bridge), built around 1806 over Main Street when a new avenue was laid to the Mansion House, and subsequently demolished around 1959.
