= Torphichen =

Coordinates: 55.934°N 3.654°W

Torphichen: Scottish Gaelic: Tòrr Fhitheachan
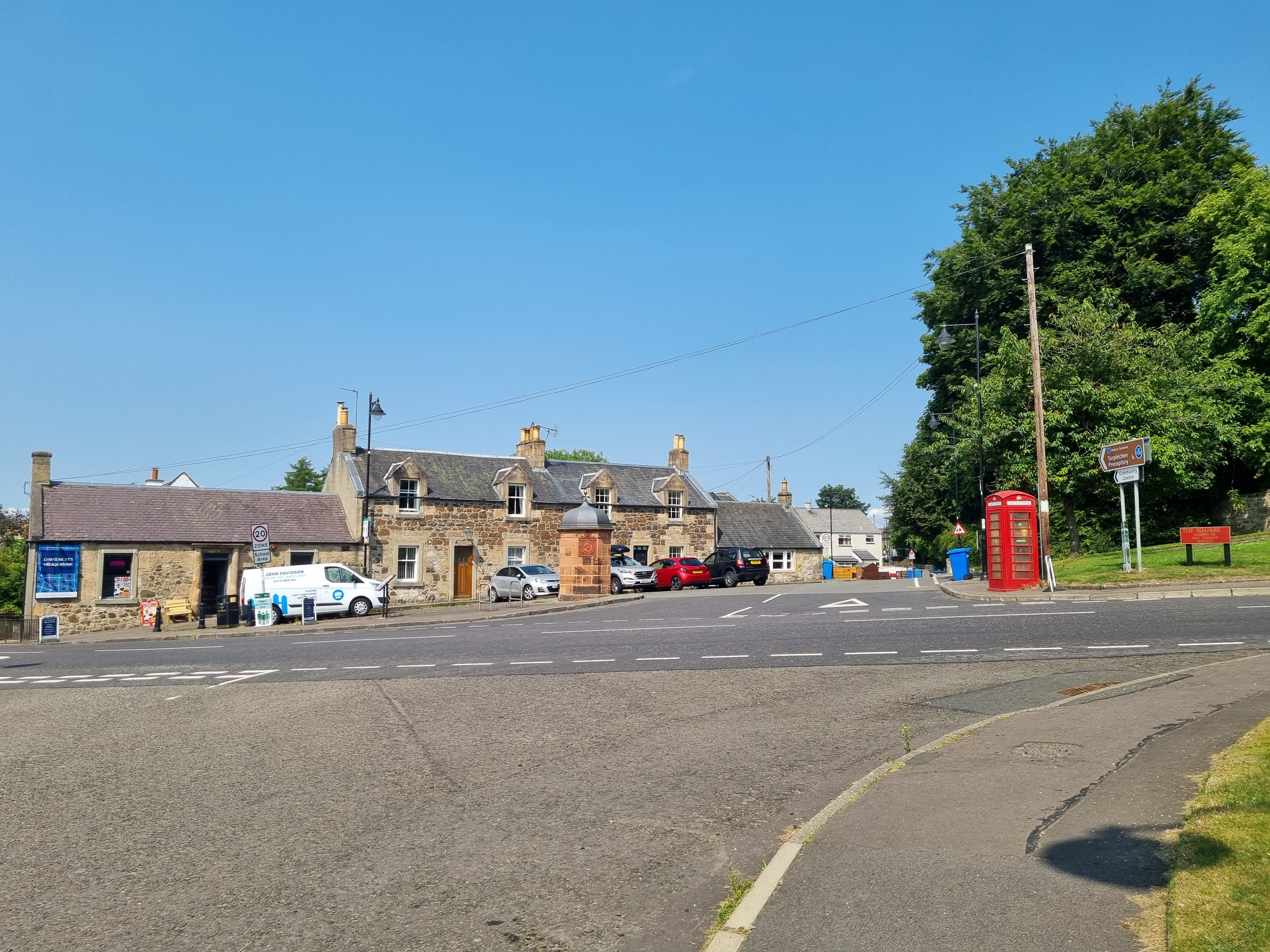
- Torphichen Village Square and Fountain

- Location within West Lothian
- Population: 710 (2020)
- OS grid reference: NS969724
- Council area: West Lothian
- Lieutenancy area: West Lothian
- Country: Scotland
- Sovereign state: United Kingdom
- Post town: BATHGATE
- Postcode district: EH48
- Dialling code: 01506
- Police: Scotland
- Fire: Scottish
- Ambulance: Scottish
- UK Parliament: Bathgate and Linlithgow
- Scottish Parliament: Bathgate

Torphichen (/tɔːrˈfɪxən/ tor-FIKH-ən) is a historic small village located north of Bathgate in West Lothian, Scotland. The village is approximately 18 miles (29 km) west of Edinburgh, 7 miles (11 km) south-east of Falkirk and 4 miles (6.4 km) south-west of Linlithgow. The village had a population of 570 in the (2011 Census) and a population of 710 in 2016. Torphichen's placename may be Gaelic in origin, e.g., "Tóir Féichín" (the boundary/sanctuary of St Féichín), Tor Fithichean (Hill of the Ravens), or partly from Brythonic "tre fychan" (little town) or small hill.

== History ==
The village (parish) church is said to have been founded by St. Ninian in about 400AD, a small wooden structure on the site of the present church (itself rebuilt in 1756). By the medieval period, the church and area had continued to develop and in 1165, the Knights Hospitaller of St. John made their Scottish headquarters at Torphichen and the Preceptory stands as testament to their presence. By 1756, part of the old structure of the Preceptory was altered to allow the creation of a new parish church for local residents, supported by patronage from the Lord Torphichen and also from the local laird Walter Gillon of Wallhouse. Wallhouse remains as a castellated country house just on the western edge of the village. The 18th century creation of the parish church also included the addition of a belfry tower, which resulted in destruction of the Norman nave.

Many of the worshippers in the Torphichen Parish "came out" of the established Church of Scotland in the Disruption and the village has the oldest purpose-built Free Church, erected that same year at the top of Low Brae in a Norman Revival Style. By 1930, the free congregation was reunited with the established church and they worshipped together again (and since) at the parish kirk (adjacent to the Preceptory). The old free church became the parish hall and is now named St. John's church hall.

In 1897, the octagonal Jubilee Fountain was added to the village square. The north side of the square contains the village post office (and shop) and several cottages, constructed in the 19th century. The West Side of the square contains several 19th-century buildings, including an 1802 Georgian town house and Rose Cottage and Smiddy (about 1800); both are listed buildings under Historic Environment Scotland. To the south of the square on High Brae is the inn (1872 incorporating older elements) and Viewforth, a B listed early 19th century house. Beside High Brae is a sundial dating to 1660. Other old buildings in the town include the listed 18th century dwellings of Ivy cottage on Low Brae and Hill House on High Brae.

The village clustered around the church and the village Square for centuries, slowly expanding northwards, a process accelerated by the creation of the James Wood Park in 1922 and of the building of council houses from 1945 in Greenside and Bowyett. In the mid-1950s, council housing was built in Priorscroft in the north and in St. John's Place in the south of the village. At that time, the village included a branch of Bathgate Co-op Society, a miners' welfare (reflecting locally resident miners rather than any substantial colliery) and a residents parish council.

In the Second World War, the primary school called "Torphichen primary" or "TPS" was a rationing point in Scotland.

In the early 1960s, the last council housing built in the village was erected in Northgate and Priorscroft in the north and also at Manse road in the south of the village. The 1960s and 1970s saw an expansion of the village to the south with a scattering of new private houses in Cathlaw Lane and Craigs Court. The 1990s saw building of more private homes at Priorsgrange and in the Loan but the village still has fewer than 350 dwellings.

== Governance ==
The village is represented in the Parliament of the United Kingdom under the Linlithgow and Falkirk East Constituency. The current Member of Parliament (MP) is Martyn Day, of the Scottish National Party).

In the Scottish Parliament, the village is in the Bathgate Constituency.

Locally, Torphichen is part of the Armadale and Blackridge Ward of West Lothian Council.

== Geography ==
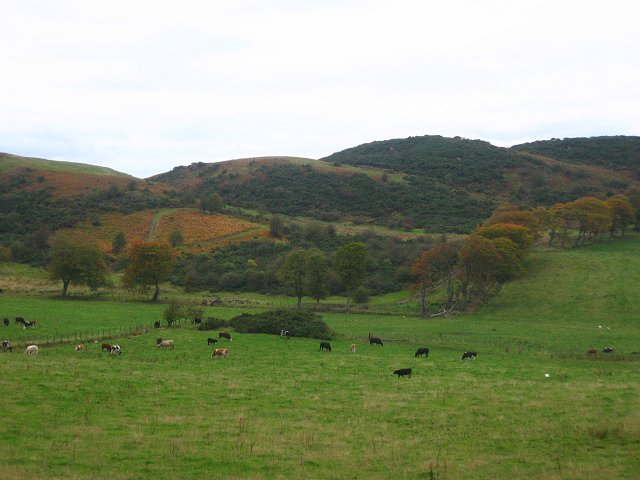
The Torphichen Hills east of Torphichen, with Castlethorn prehistoric hillfort on the left

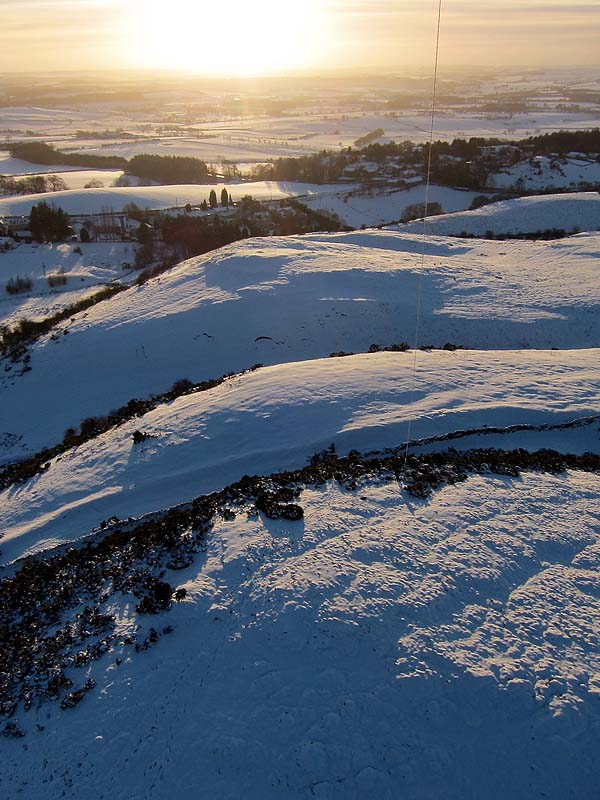
An aerial view of Castlethorn Hillfort looking south from Gormyre Hill.

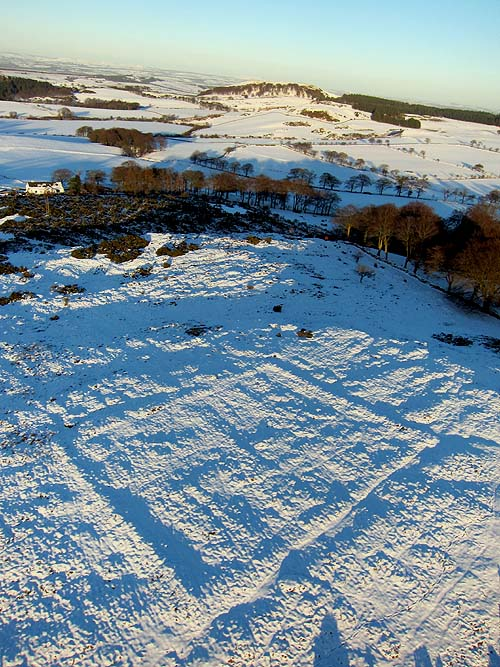
An aerial view of Gormyre Hill looking north-east.

The village is located in the Central Belt of Scotland adjacent to the nearby Torphichen and Bathgate hills (including Castlethorn and Gormyre hill), which have numerous dykes with sills up to 300 ft. On the southern edge of the village is a large forested hill called the Craigs. The Cunnigar is a natural feature on the edge of the village, said to be the depression from the remains of a well that served the knights at the preceptory. Historically, the area around the village was mined, with several disused quarries now nearby. These include workings of Quartz-dolerite 0.5 miles east of the village.

Lochcote reservoir is a water Reservoir to the north-east of the village. The Brunton burn is a small stream that passes by close to the village (the adjacent water storage tank for the village was subsequently converted into a dwelling). There is a large water treatment works to the west of the village that serves the greater area, which was redeveloped in 2013 at a cost of £2 million.

== Economy ==
The commercial life of the village is focused around the square, where the Torphichen Inn and village shop can be found. The village is a popular site for day visitors to the Preceptory. Other than the limited tourism and hospitality, many of the residents work in the agricultural sector, in nearby farms or are commuters, to larger towns such as Bathgate, Falkirk, Linlithgow and Edinburgh.

== Culture and Community ==
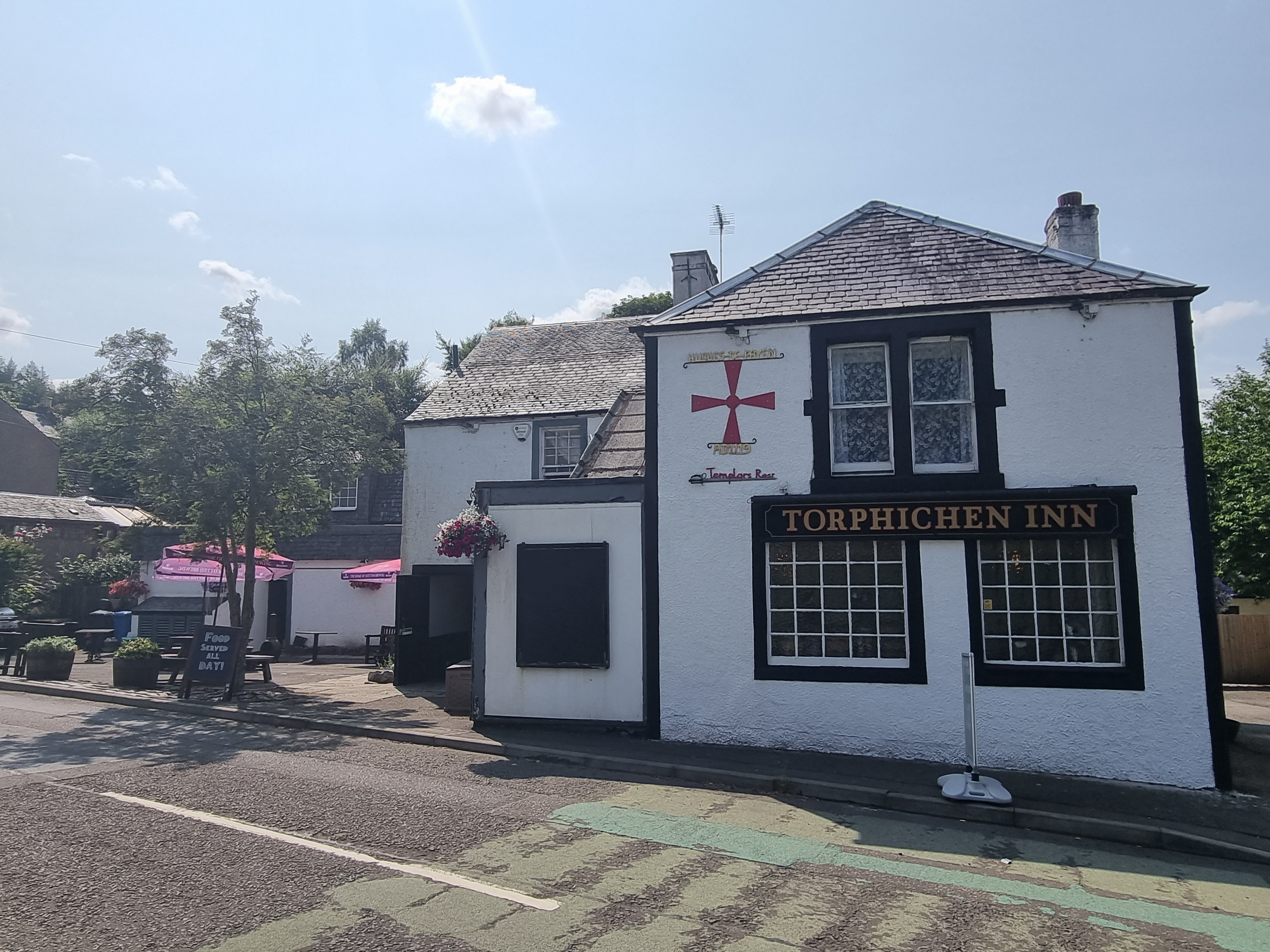
Torphichen Inn seen from the Village Square

Community events include an annual Children's Gala day and civic week, and there is a community centre and other local organisations. The Children's Gala day celebrated its centenary in 2008 when Queen Caroline Perry was crowned by the first minister of Scotland, Alex Salmond MSP. In 2020 and 2021, the Gala day celebrations were cancelled due to the COVID-19 pandemic.

West Lothian District Scouts have a permanent camp site at Torphichen called The Craigs.

=== Torphichen and Bathgate Pipe Band ===
The Torphichen and Bathgate Pipe Band was established in 1902, and led the parade at the very first Gala Day in 1908. The band survived two World Wars and over the following decades won a host of championship prizes, including the Grade 2 World Championships in 1989. Today,the band is ranked amongst the world's best in the premier division of Grade 1 competition and features a roster of players drawn from all over Scotland.

== Education ==
Torphichen primary school is a primary school located in the village on the Loan. The original school building was extended in 2017. The nearest Secondary schools are Linlithgow Academy in Linlithgow and Bathgate Academy in Bathgate.

== Notable Buildings ==
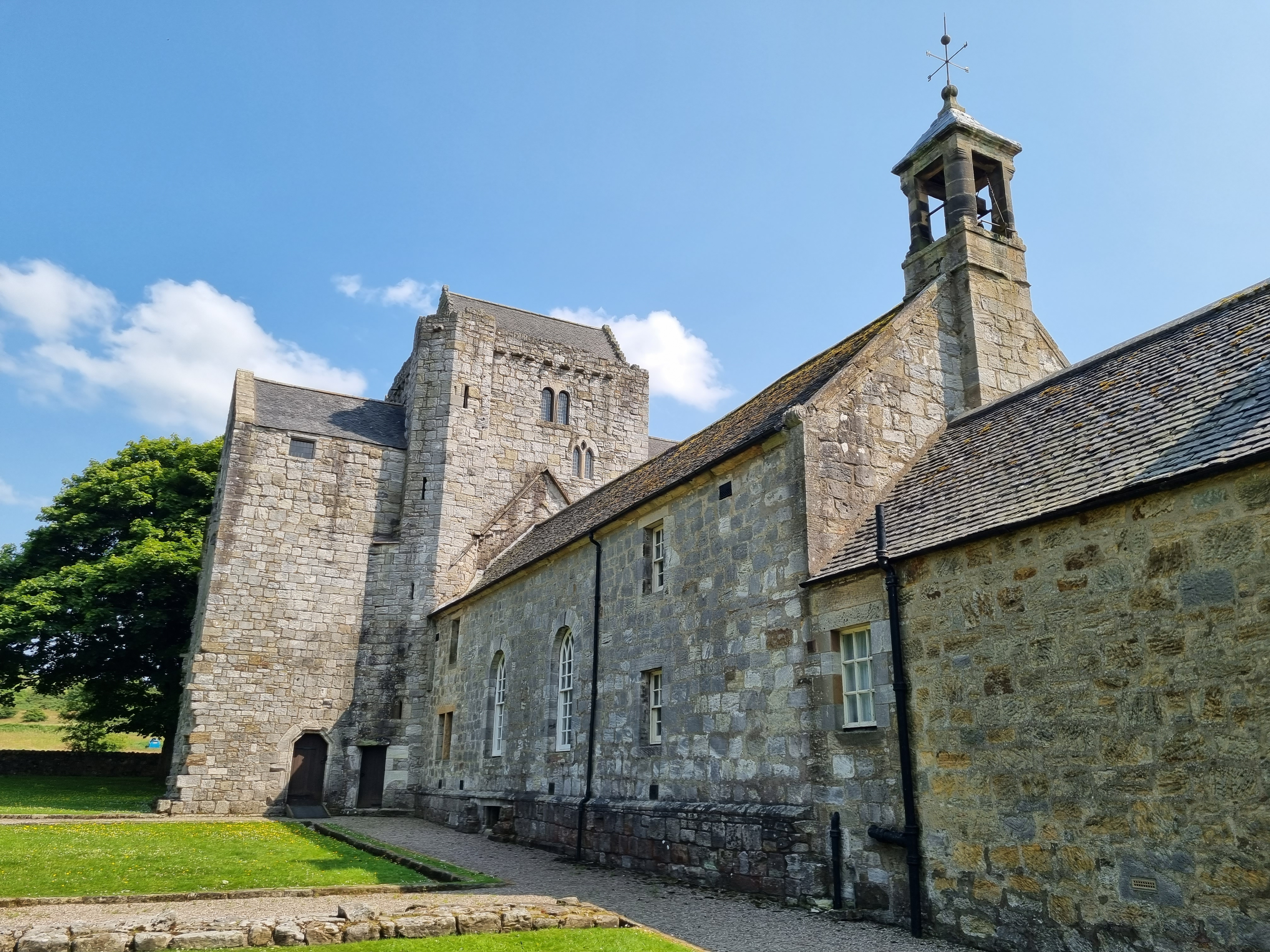
Torphichen Preceptory and the later attached Parish Kirk seen from the west

Torphichen Preceptory is a religious house founded by Knights Hospitaller at the invitation of King David I in the 1140s. The first mention of buildings in their use in the village dates from 1168. The last Preceptor of the House, Sir James Sandilands, surrendered the lands of the preceptory during the Reformation to the crown, but then bought them back as a private individual. He received the title Lord Torphichen. The graveyard contains a stone by Sir James Gowans to his parents Isabella and Walter Gowans.

Torphichen Inn in its current form dates from around 1872 but has fragments of a much older building (historically known as the Burnside Inn). The pub is beside the village square, the focus of which is the red sandstone Jubilee Fountain (1897). The parish church (attaching the Preceptory) dates from 1756.

Castlethorn, in the adjacent Torphichen Hills on the eastern side of the preceptory, is a scheduled prehistoric hillfort.

== Notable residents ==
- Henry Bell, a noted engineer who introduced the successful passenger steamboat service in Europe in 1812, was born in the village in 1767. The Bell family were local millwrights and engineers.
- Alexander Simpson (1725–1816), grandfather of the pioneering anaesthetist Sir James Young Simpson
