= Clan Sandilands =

Scottish clan

- Motto: Spero Meliora (I Hope for Better Things)

Chief
- The Right Honourable James Andrew Douglas Sandilands
- 15th Lord Torphichen
Rival clans
Clan Douglas (15th century)

Clan Sandilands is a Scottish clan. It is also considered a sept of the larger Clan Douglas.

== History ==
=== Origins of the clan ===
The name Sandilands comes from lands by that name in Clydesdale. The family may have originally fled to Scotland from Northumberland in the reign of Malcolm III of Scotland.

=== Wars of Scottish Independence ===
During the Wars of Scottish Independence, Sir James de Sandilands distinguished himself in the wars against the English. For his services he was rewarded with a royal charter to his lands by David II of Scotland. He married Eleanor, the only daughter of Sir Archibald Douglas, Regent of Scotland. James Sandilands received from his brother-in-law, William IV, Lord of Douglas the lands of Calder in Lothian. In 1333 Sir James Sandilands was killed at the Battle of Halidon Hill.

=== 15th century ===
Sir James Sandilands' son also called James was one of the hostages sent to England for James I of Scotland. James Sandilands was only returned to Scotland two years before his death. He was the presumptive heir to the Douglas estates and should have inherited them on the death of the James Douglas, 2nd Earl of Douglas. However the estates went instead to George Douglas, Earl of Angus, Douglas's natural son.

James Sandilands was succeeded by his son, John Sandilands. The Clan Sandilands found themselves in opposition to the Clan Douglas faction and were unshakeable in their loyalty to James II of Scotland. John Sandilands and his uncle were assassinated by Patrick Thornton upon the orders of the Douglas faction. The Sandilands estates were then inherited by James Sandilands who married an heiress, Margaret Kinloch of Cruvie, and one of their sons, James Sandilands of Cruvie, established a branch of the clan that would later become the Lords Abercrombie.

=== 16th century ===
Sir James Sandilands of Calder was a friend of the Protestant reformer, John Knox. He was also preceptor of the powerful religious and military Order of the Knights of St John, whose headquarters were at the Priory of Torphichen in West Lothian.

When the Order was suppressed, he managed to obtain a grant of much of its lands on payment to the Crown of ten thousand crowns in gold and an annual rent of five hundred merks. Previously, the preceptors had sat as peers in Parliament under the title of ‘Lord St. John of Torphichen’, an interesting case of a title belonging to an office and not hereditary in any one family. Sir James kept his seat in Parliament, being created Lord Torphichen. He died without issue, and the new title devolved on James, the grandson of his elder brother, who succeeded as second Lord Torphichen.

=== 17th Century and Civil War ===
The first Lord’s half-brother, Sir James Sandilands of Slamannan, was a Gentleman of the Bedchamber to James VI of Scotland and later keeper of Blackness Castle. The second Lord had four sons. John, the fourth Lord, although a supporter of Charles I of England strongly advised against the plan known as the Engagement. The Engagers sought to invade England in 1648 to rescue the king, in return for certain conditions, after he had been handed over to Parliament by the Scots army. However the plan ended in disaster.

=== 18th century and Jacobite risings ===
==== Jacobite rising of 1715 ====
James Sandilands, 7th Lord Torphichen supported the Treaty of Union and took his seat in Parliament in 1704. He served in the army on the Continent and returned to Scotland during the Jacobite rising of 1715, in which he fought on the side of the British government at the Battle of Sheriffmuir. He was appointed by George I of Great Britain as one of the Commissioners of Police in 1722.

==== Jacobite rising of 1745 ====
James Sandiland's eldest son was wounded during the campaigns of the Jacobite rising of 1745 fighting against the forces of the Jacobite, Charles Edward Stewart, the Young Pretender. Sandilands later died of consumption. His second son was Walter Sandilands who had embarked upon a career in the law, succeeded to the title while sheriff of Midlothian. The sheriff’s son, James Sandilands, was a colonel in the Coldstream Guards and was elected a representative peer to the House of Lords from 1790 to 1800. He was succeeded by his first cousin, another James, and it is from this James whom the present Lord Torphichen, who still lives at Calder, is lineally descended.

== Tartan ==
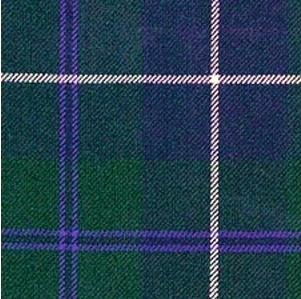
Douglas tartan

The tartan associated with Sandilands is the Douglas tartan.

== See also ==
- Scottish clan
