= Mid Calder =

Village in West Lothian, Scotland

Coordinates: 55.8918°N 3.4810°W

Mid Calder: Scottish Gaelic: Caladair Mheadhain; Scots: Mid Cauder
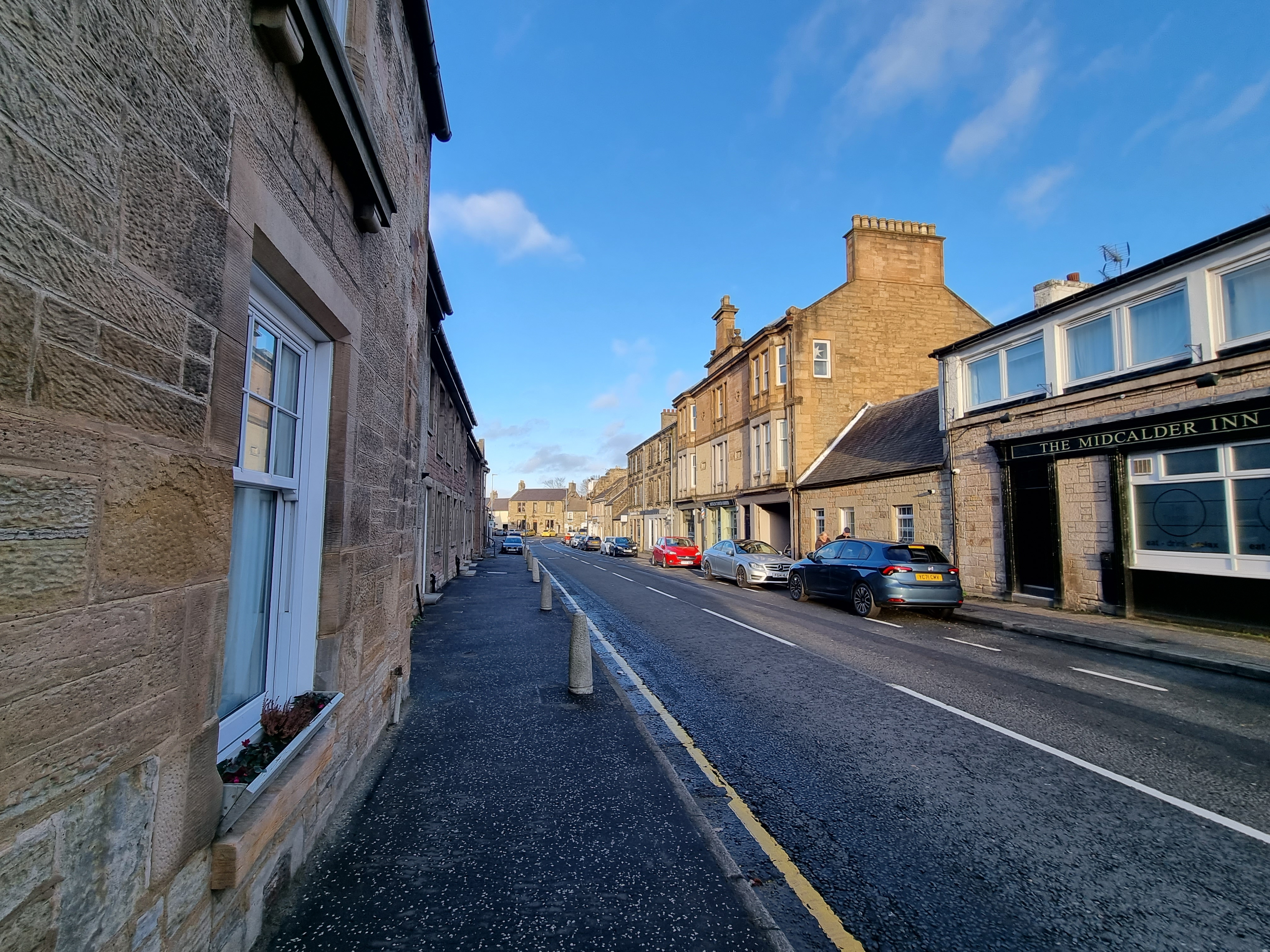
- View of Main Street, Mid Calder, West Lothian

- Location within West Lothian
- Population: 3,300 (2020)
- OS grid reference: NT073675
- Civil parish: Mid Calder
- Council area: West Lothian
- Lieutenancy area: West Lothian
- Country: Scotland
- Sovereign state: United Kingdom
- Post town: Livingston
- Postcode district: EH53
- Dialling code: 01506
- Police: Scotland
- Fire: Scottish
- Ambulance: Scottish
- UK Parliament: Livingston
- Scottish Parliament: Almond Valley

Mid Calder (Scots: Mid Calder; Scottish Gaelic: Caladar Mheadhain) is a village in West Lothian, Scotland. It is located on a steep hill overlooking the River Almond and Calder Wood, around 15 miles (24 km) west of Edinburgh. The settlement has been on a major crossroads since its origin some time in the 11th century.

== History ==
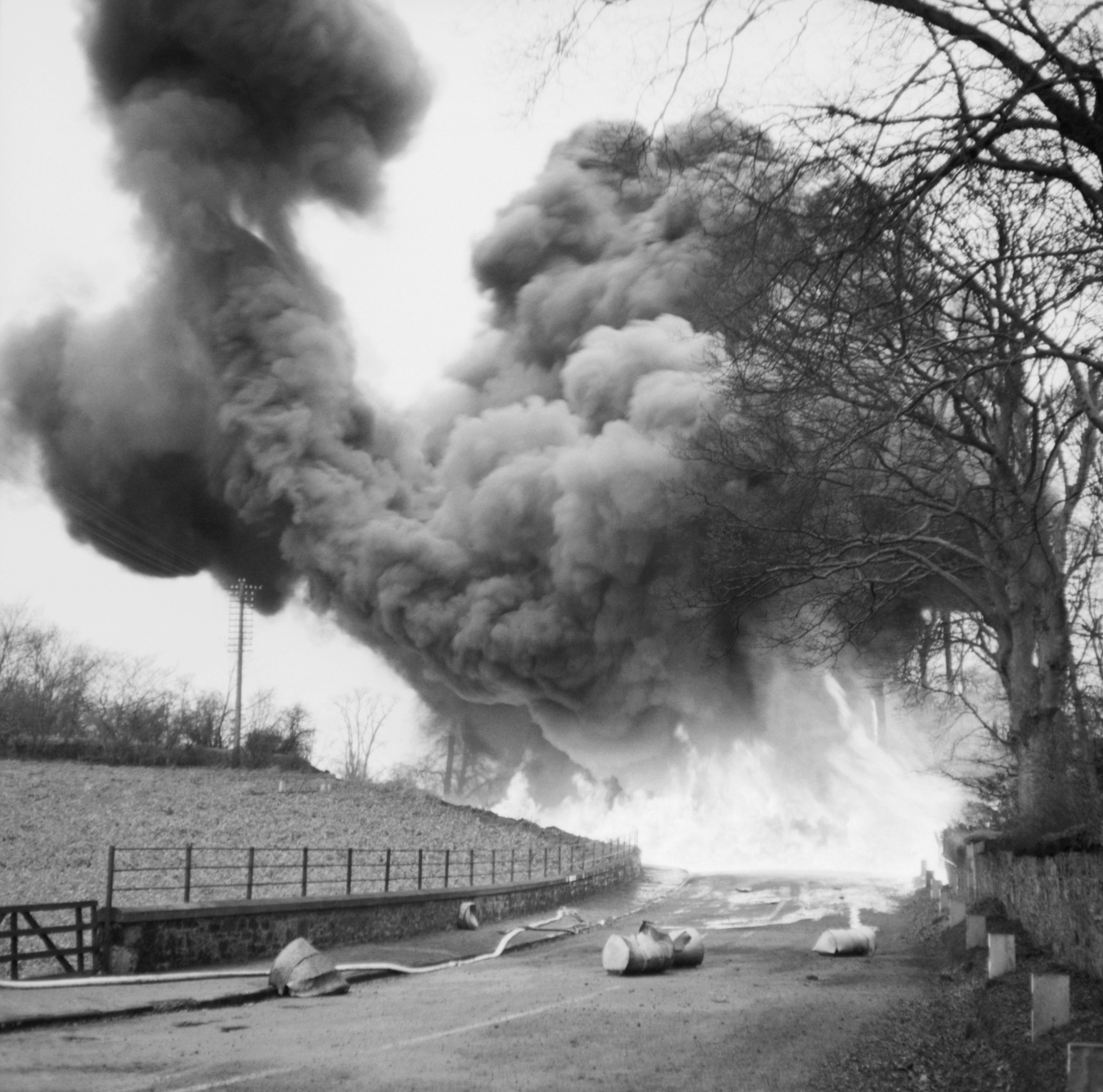
A flame barrage demonstration staged by the Petroleum Warfare Department 28 November 1940

In the 14th century, during the Wars of Scottish Independence, Sir James de Sandilands distinguished himself in the wars against the English. For his services he was rewarded with a royal charter of his lands by David II of Scotland. James was well connected and married Eleanor, the only daughter of Sir Archibald Douglas, Regent of Scotland. The gift included extensive estates in what is now West Lothian, and the Barony of Calder. After the Reformation in 1560, Sir James Sandilands, the head of the Sandilands family, was created Lord Torphichen. Since 1348 the family seat has been at Calder House, near to the middle of the village.

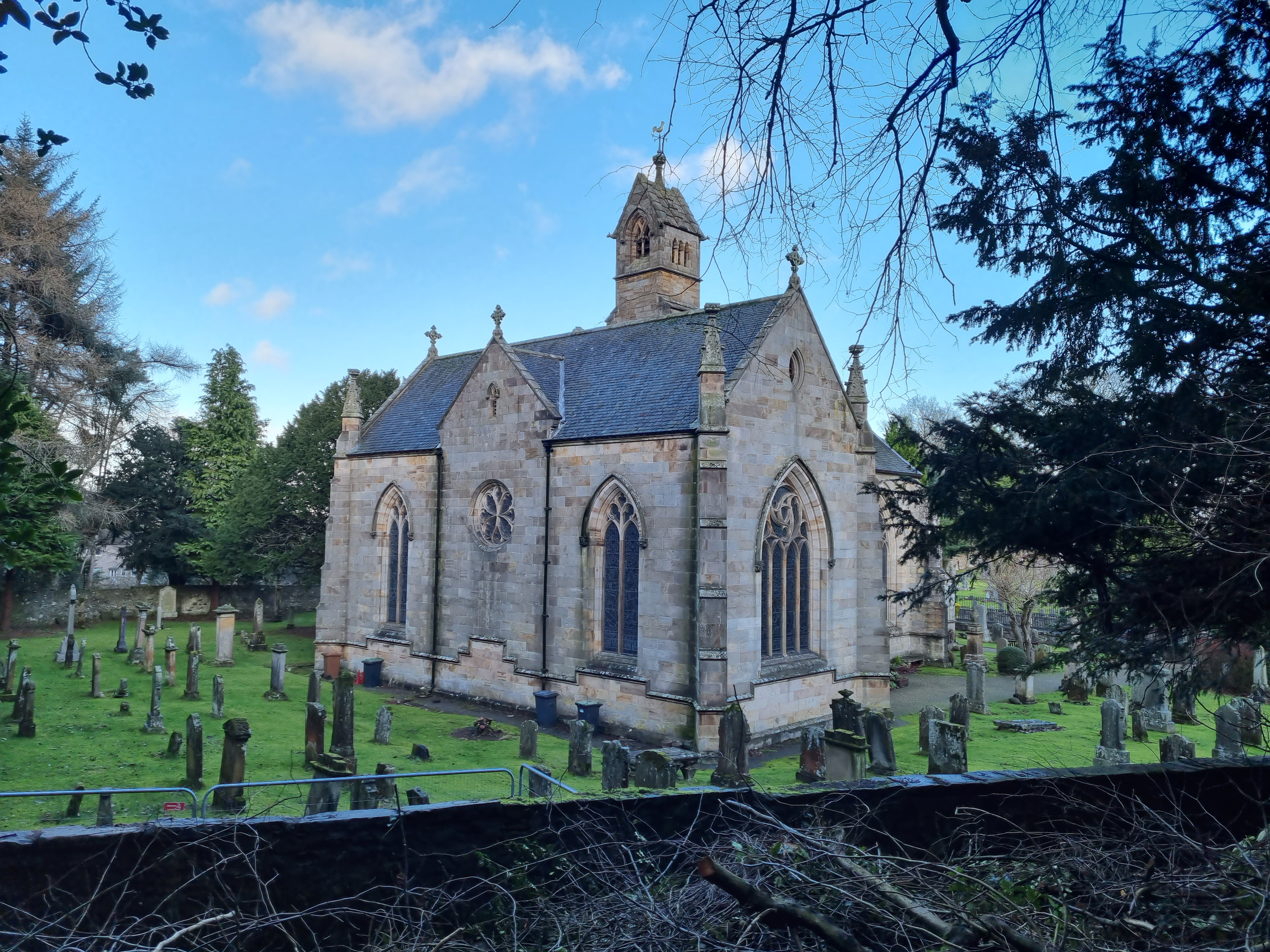
Kirk of Calder.

For centuries a large part of the economy of the Scottish Highlands revolved around the breeding and trading of Highland cattle. They were moved along drove roads from all parts of the country, including some of the islands, to trysts or markets held in Crieff and Falkirk. Most of the cattle would then be driven south to feed consumers in England. Several of the drove routes used came together at Mid Calder. Huge herds of cattle would come across fords or bridges over the River Almond before crossing the Pentland Hills to West Linton. The peak year was 1840 when some 150,000 cattle passed through the area over the three months from August to October. This traffic helped support no fewer than nine public houses in the village. One example is the original Torphichen Inn on bank Street (now named the Fork and Field), the building dates to 1763 and was paid for by the Lords Torphichen.

In the 17th century, Mid Calder was the site of several witch hunts, including the torture and death by burning of several alleged 'witches' at Cunnigar Hill in Mid Calder (still known locally as Witches’ Knowe).

Meanwhile, Mid Calder also lay on the main turnpike road from Edinburgh to Glasgow, adding a steady flow of east–west traffic to the seasonal influx of drovers heading south. However, the importance of the turnpike lessened at the same time as the cattle droving stopped, and for the same reason: the railways. And for once the acumen and foresight that had allowed the Sandilands to retain their position for so many centuries missed a beat. When the railway came to West Lothian in 1848, the then Lord Torphichen decreed that it should not come near Calder House. As a result, Mid Calder was served by a station at Kirknewton, three miles away which was called Mid Calder until 1982. This meant that adapting to the loss of its traditional sources of income could have been difficult for the village. But at precisely the right moment the world's first oil boom occurred, in West Lothian. This was based on oil extracted from shale, and by 1870 over 3 million tons of shale were being mined each year in the area around Mid Calder. Output declined with the discovery of liquid oil reserves around the world in the early 1900s, but shale mining only finally ceased in 1962. The "bings" that characterise oil shale mining elsewhere in West Lothian have largely been flattened around Mid Calder and the land reclaimed for recreation, industry and housing. Many of the buildings on Main street and Bank Street in the village were built during the shale oil boom period.

Another major factor leading to Mid Calder's current prosperity has been the dramatic growth of nearby Livingston, now the second largest settlement in the Lothians and whose main shopping centre is only a mile to the west. The outlying areas of Mid Calder were heavily built upon in the 1980s, and as a result, housing estates are now nearby to both Calder House and woodlands.

In 2005, Mid Calder was subject to unwanted publicity when it became the first place in Britain to issue an ASBO in a village-wide crackdown on the anti-social behaviour of drunken teenagers. The ASBO allowed police to disperse any young person found outdoors. After one month of operation, the order was deemed a success.

== Governance ==
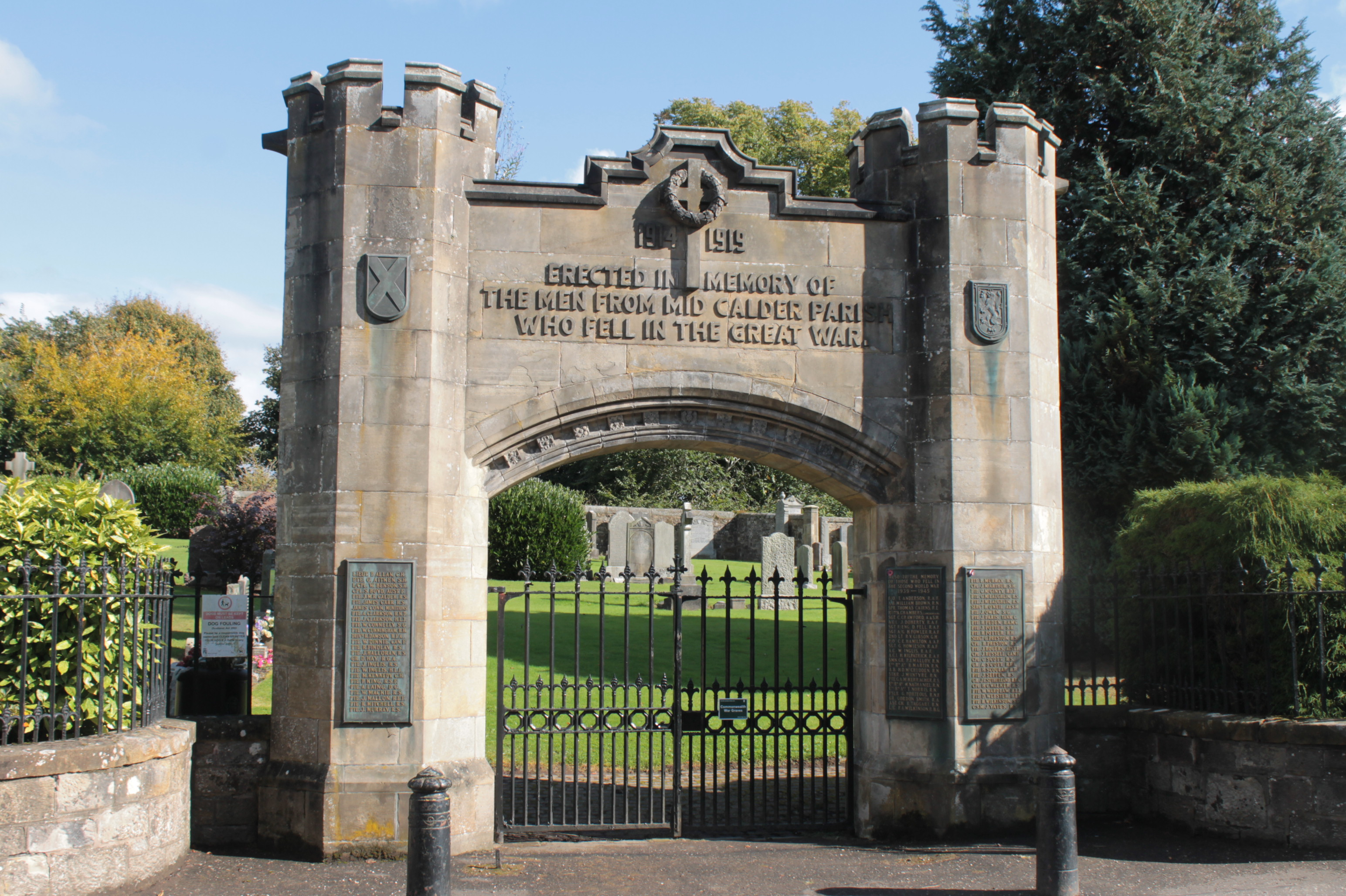
Mid Calder War Memorial forming entrance to the cemetery

Mid Calder was traditionally in the county of Midlothian, with the boundary between Midlothian and West Lothian being the River Almond. In the 1970s, reforms transferred it to West Lothian.

Mid Calder, along with the rest of West Lothian, is an SNP and Labour marginal seat.

In West Lothian council, Mid Calder is part of the East Livingston and East Calder Ward and is represented by four councillors. who are Carl John (SNP), Frank Anderson (SNP), Damian Timson (Conservative) and Dave King (Labour).

Mid Calder is part of the Almond Valley Constituency since 1999 and is represented by the SNP's Angela Constance who has held the seat since 2007 when the constituency was called Livingston.

Mid Calder has been part of the Livingston UK Parliament constituency since 1983. Labour Party Member of Parliament (MP) Gregor Poynton represents the town.

Prior to Brexit in 2020 it was part of the Scotland European Parliament constituency.

=== Public Services ===
The local police force for Mid Calder is Police Scotland and the village is in East Livingston and East Calder policing ward. Following the closure of the police station that was located on Market Street in Mid Calder, the policing ward's station is at Broxburn.

Waste collection services are provided by West Lothian Council. Water and Sewage services are provided by Scottish Water.

== Community Facilities ==
Mid Calder community centre (with a public hall and meeting rooms) is located on Market Street. The Kirk of Calder also has a community hall known as the Glenalmond Hall which was purchased in 1990 to host church events for the local community.

Mid Calder is also home to Lodge St John Mid Calder number 272 on the Roll of the Grand Lodge of Scotland. This Freemason lodge was formed on 4 May 1818 (although Freemasonry was active in the area since at least the 1750s). Since 1936 the lodge has owned its own building at the entrance of the Calder Wood Country Park.

== Transport ==
The nearest station to Mid Calder is Livingston South on the Shotts Line which is 1.6 miles (2.6 km) away. Kirknewton railway station which is 2 miles (3.2 km) from Mid Calder was called Mid Calder between 1855 and 1982.

Mid Calder is 6 miles (9.7 km) South of Edinburgh Airport and 37 miles (59.5 km) east of Glasgow Airport both of which have regular flights to UK and international destinations.

Mid Calder is served by regular bus services connecting it to other parts of West Lothian and Edinburgh.

Lothian Country operate services:

- X27 - Edinburgh - Calderwood - East Calder - Mid Calder - Livingston - Deans North - Bathgate
- X28 - Edinburgh - Kirknewton - East Calder - Mid Calder - Livingston - Deans North - Bathgate
- X40 - Royal Infirmary - Gilmerton - Westside Plaza - Calderwood - East Calder - Mid Calder - Livingston Centre - St. John's Hospital
- N28 - Edinburgh - Kirknewton - East Calder - Mid Calder - Livingston - Deans North - Bathgate (Night Service)

== Education ==
The two primary schools for local children are Mid Calder Primary School (on Main St) and nearby East Calder Primary School.

The nearest secondary schools are The James Young High School and St. Margaret's RC Academy in Livingston.

== Religion ==
The Kirk of Calder is a Ashlar stone Gothic style Church of Scotland church in Mid Calder. The present Kirk dates from 1541 but was built on the site of an earlier 12th century church. The church was commissioned, designed and paid for by the Sandilands family of the adjacent Calder house. The transepts and belfry were added in 1863. The adjacent manse house on Main Street is named Brewery House and has an 18th-century exterior with evidence of an earlier building inside.

== Media ==
The local paid newspaper is the West Lothian Courier (Daily Record). Residents also receive the West Lothian Bulletin, a free publication, up to four times a year. On a wider scale there is Edinburgh's local paid newspaper which is the Edinburgh Evening News.

The local BBC radio stations are BBC Radio Scotland and the Scottish Gaelic station BBC Radio nan Gàidheal. Local commercial radio includes Forth One and Capital FM Scotland. The local television regions are BBC Scotland and STV Central.

== Notable people ==
- Angus McLagan, New Zealand cabinet minister
- Rev John Spottiswood and his son John Spottiswoode, archbishop of St. Andrews
- George Smith RSA, artist, born and raised in Mid Calder
- Luke Crosbie, Scottish international rugby player
