= George Smith (Scottish artist) =

George Smith RSA (2 February 1870 – 26 November 1934) was a Scottish artist specialising in landscapes and animals, with an emphasis on horses at work.

== Life ==
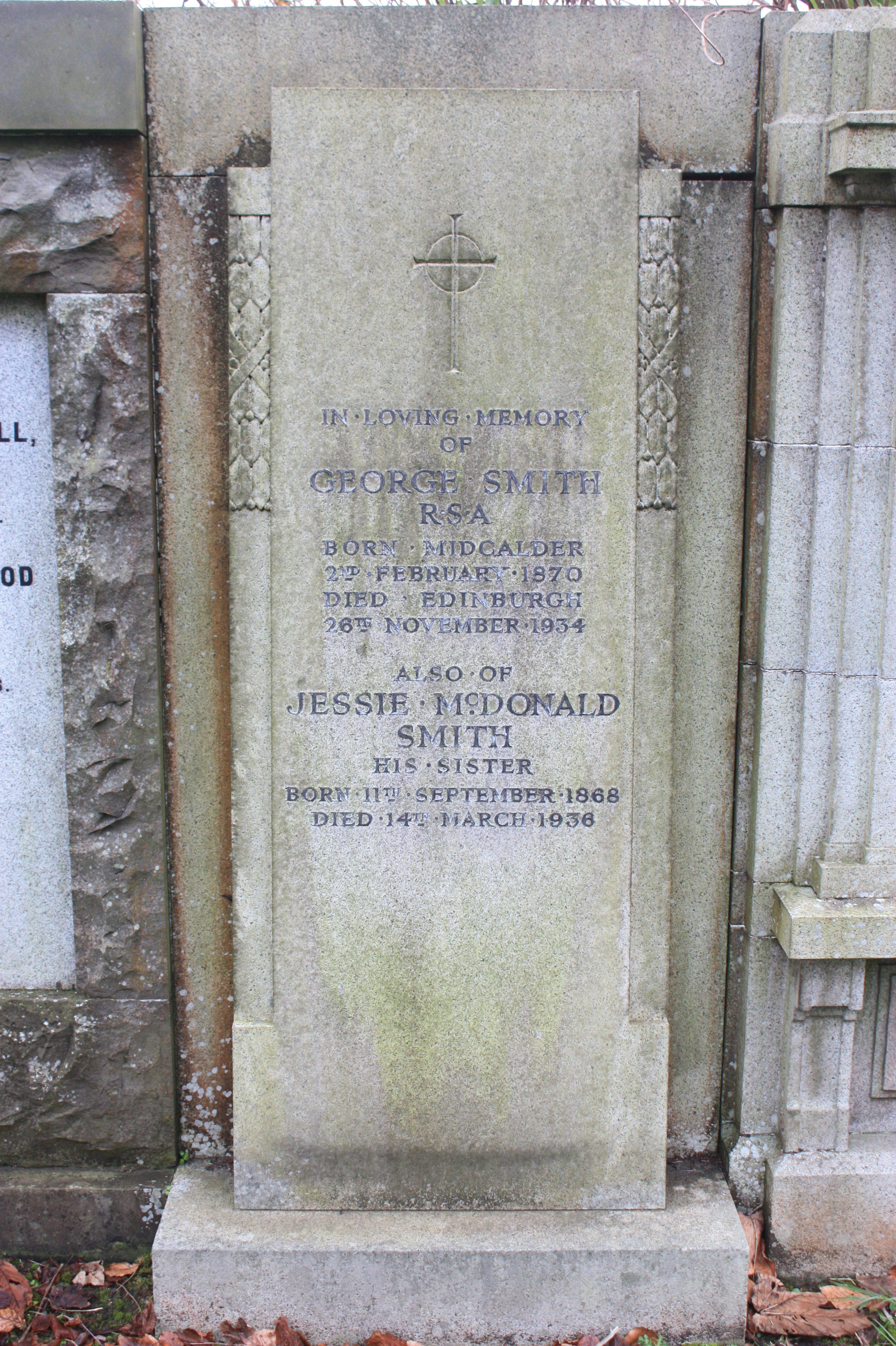
The grave of George Smith RSA, Grange Cemetery, Edinburgh

He was born on 2 February 1870 in Mid Calder in West Lothian, just west of Edinburgh. He was educated at George Watsons College then studied art at the Board of Manufacturers in Edinburgh and then in Antwerp under Charles Verlat.

In the late 19th century he shared a studio with friend and fellow artist James Christie Prowett (1865–1946) at Beaton’s Mill in Bannockburn near Stirling. Prowett specialised in landscapes. Smith exhibited at the Royal Academy in London and Royal Scottish Academy. In later life he lived at 47 Lauder Road in the Grange area of Edinburgh.

He died on 26 November 1934 and is buried with his sister in the Grange Cemetery in southern Edinburgh, close to his home. The grave lies against the south wall towards the south-east corner of the main cemetery.

== Biography ==
Smith’s biography, The Life and Work of George Smith RSA (1870–1934) was written by Derek Ogsten in 1999.

== Works ==
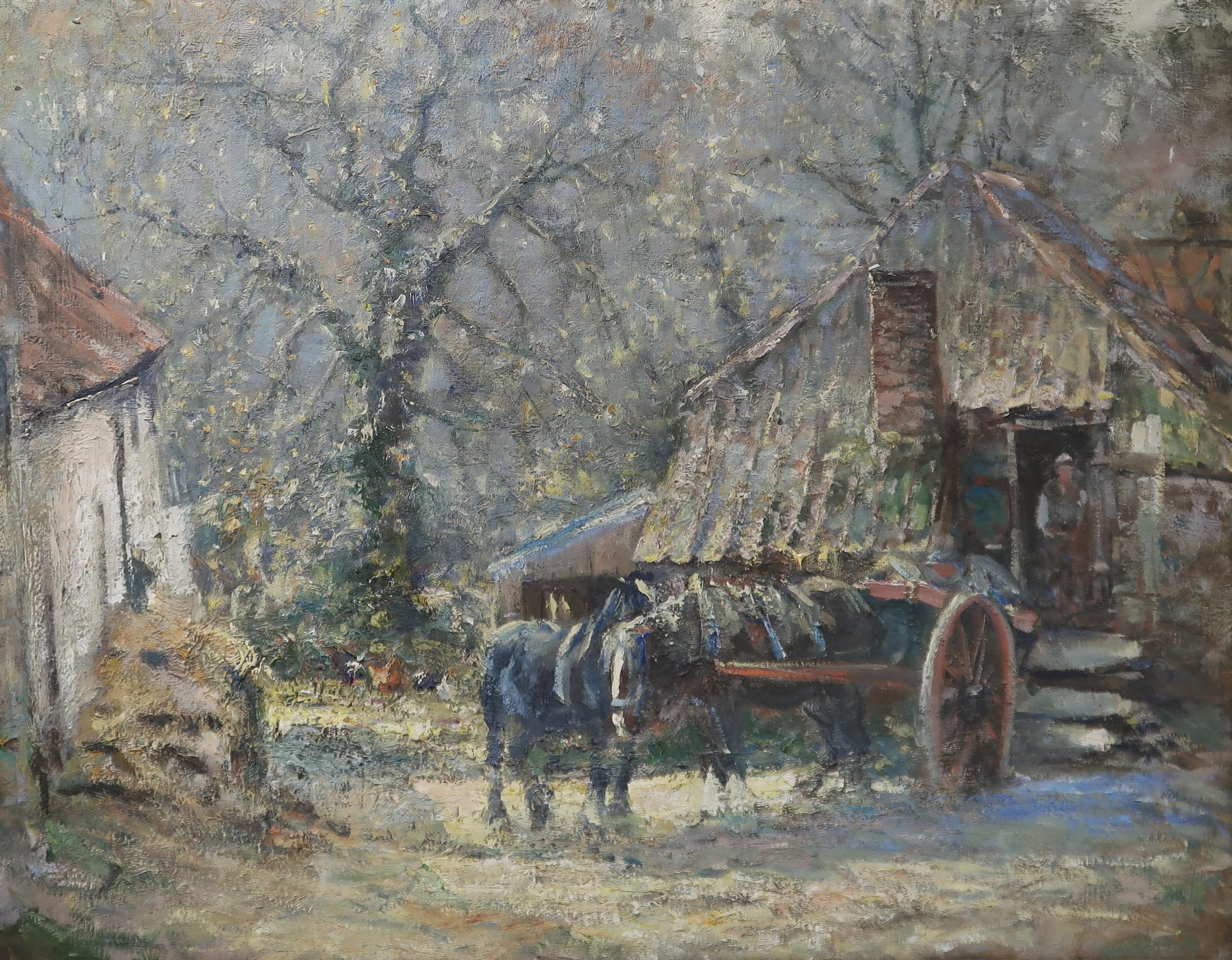
Muckhart Mill

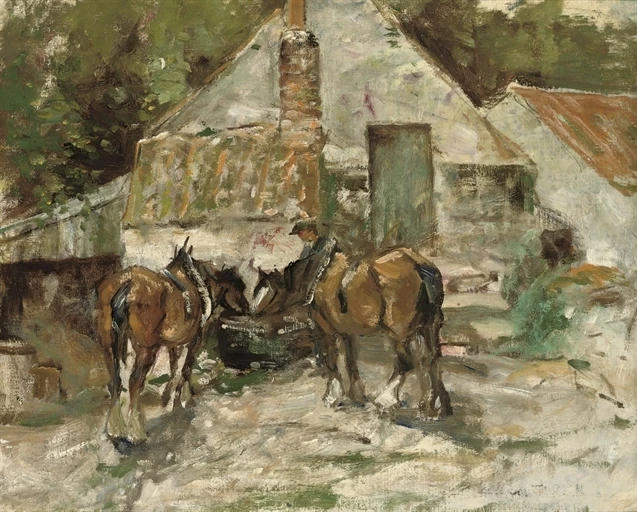
Horses at Water Trough

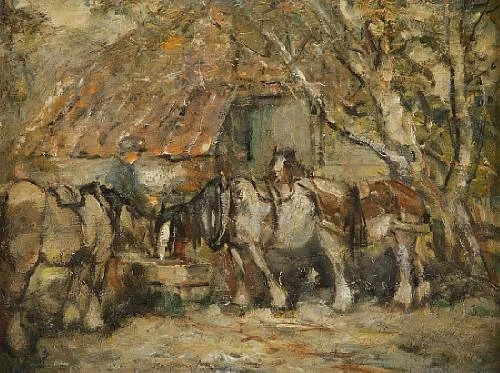
Watering the Horses near Aberdour

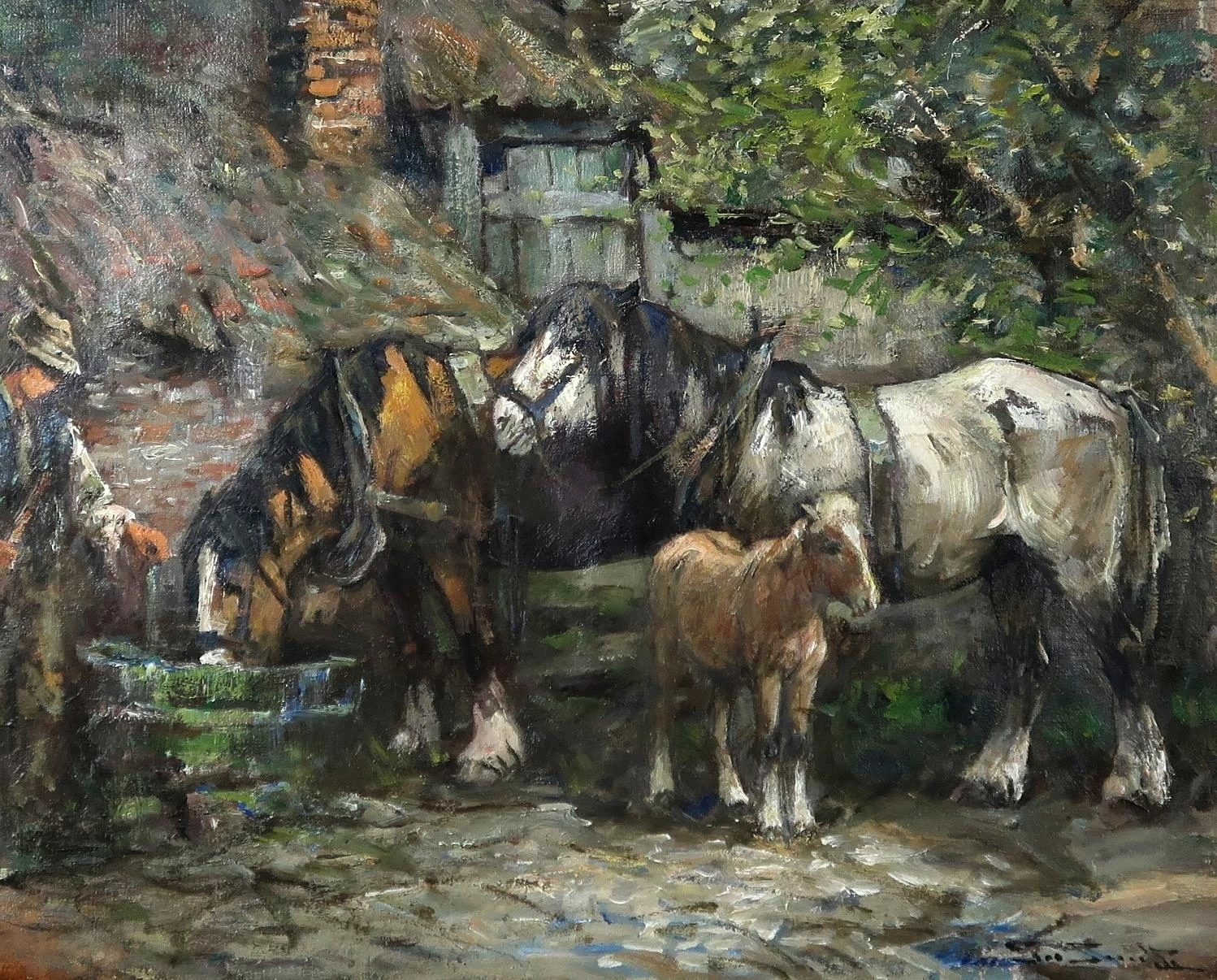
Watering the Horses
