= Kirk of Calder =

Church in Scotland

Coordinates: 55°53′24″N 3°28′57″W

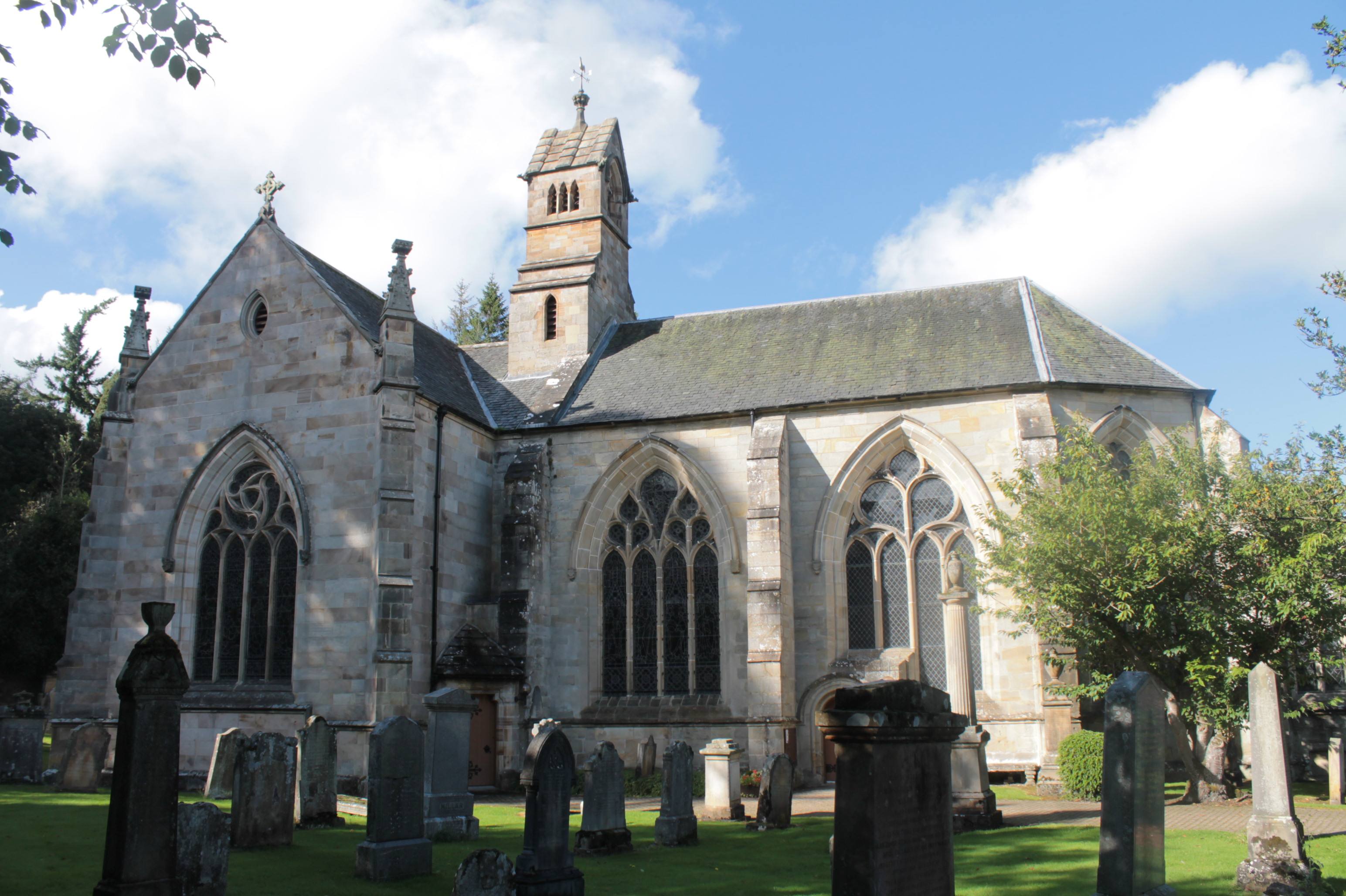
- Kirk of Calder, Mid Calder
- Kirk of Calder
- Location: Main Street, Mid Calder
- Country: Scotland
- Denomination: Church of Scotland
- Website: www.kirkofcalder.com

History
- Founded: 1541
- Founder: The Sandilands family (Lord Torphichen)

Architecture
- Heritage designation: Grade I
- Years built: 1541 - 1863

Kirk of Calder is a medieval church in Mid Calder, West Lothian. It is listed as a Category A building by Historic Environment Scotland. The church is of Ashlar stone in a Gothic style. The present Kirk dates from 1541 but was built on the site of an earlier 12th century church.

== History ==
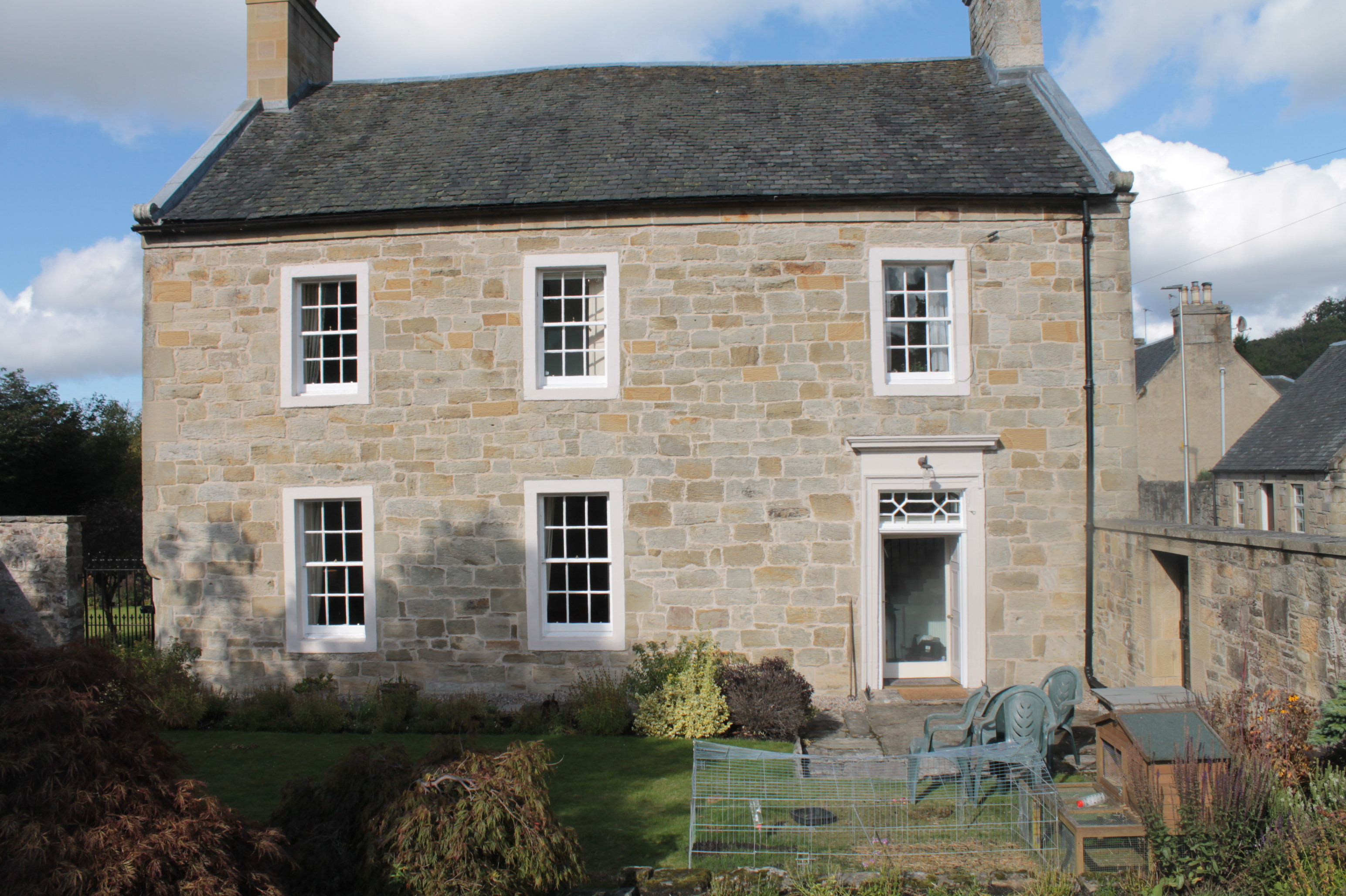
Kirk of Calder manse - "Brewery House"

The church was originally intended to be far larger. It was begun in 1541 by Peter Sandilands, laird of the adjacent Calder House, but only the choir from the original design was built by the time his nephew Sir John Sandilands "completed" the project in 1545. The west section of nave and entrance is absent. The belfry and transept was built in 1863 on the correct north-south axis, but the entrance is uniquely located in a small door at the re-entrant angle between the south transept and the choir.

The church was certainly operational by the time of the Reformation in 1560. The parish was originally called "Calder Comitis" but in 1646 was split into Mid Calder and West Calder. The separate parish of East Calder was originally called "Calder Clere" at this time. All were under the Presbytery of Linlithgow until 1884, when it became part of the Presbytery of Edinburgh.

The manse to the east is generally known as "Brewery House". This appears to be a humorous reference to the defection of Rev Mackenzie, for whom the house was probably built/rebuilt c.1680, to the brewing trade.

Inside the church, there is a carved wooden pew dated 1595. The interior includes a stained glass memorial window (1895 by Hardman)) to James Young FRS ("Paraffin Young").

Significant conservation work was undertaken in the early 1990s.

== Current status ==
The church remains an operational community church with weekly services.

== Ministers ==
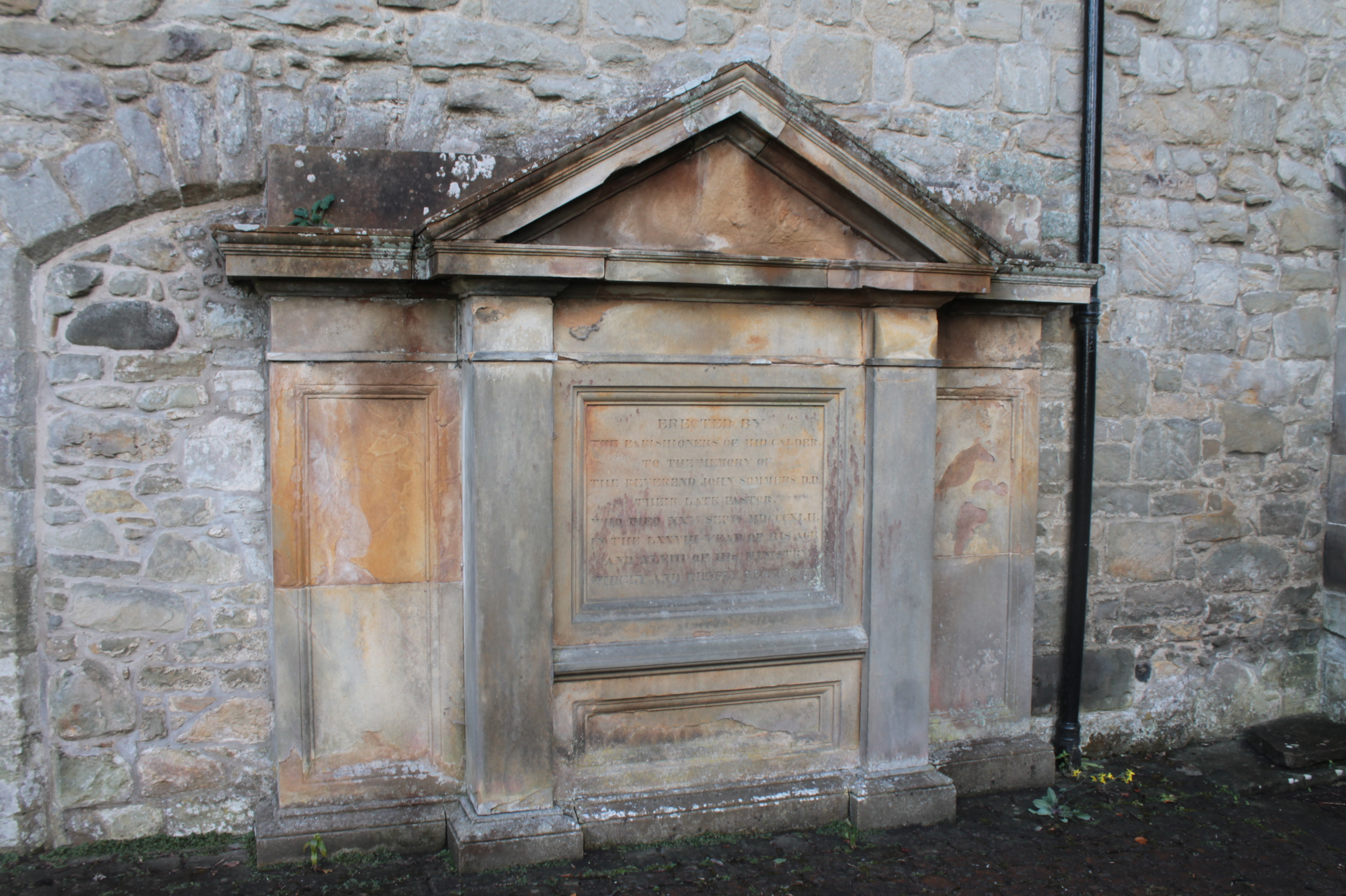
The grave of Rev Dr John Sommers, Kirk of Calder

- John Spotiswood 1560 to 1583
- John Spottiswoode 1583 to 1604
- Robert Gilmour 1604 to 1616
- John Tennent 1617 to 1638
- George Dunbar 1638 to 1641
- Hew Kennedy 1643 to 1660 linked to several witchcraft trials
- John Colvill 1663 to 1671
- John Somerville 1672 to 1674
- Norman Mackenzie 1675 to 1687 abandoned his duties to be a brewer in Edinburgh
- Hew Kennedy 1687 briefly
- William Burnett 1687 to 1696
- John Lookup 1698 to 1758 minister for 60 years
- James Watson 1759 to 1772
- James Dobie 1773 to 1792
- James Wilson 1792 to 1794
- John Sommers 1795 to 1842
- William Walker 1843 to 1882
- Matthew Gardner 1883 to 1893
- David John Moir Porteous 1894 to 1907
- William Weir Clerk 1907 to 1949
- David Rosie 1949 to 1981
- John M Povey 1981 to 2021.
- William D Watt 2025 -

== Notable graves ==
- Peter McLagan MP (1823-1900)
