= Torphichen Preceptory =

Coordinates: 55.93464°N 3.6524°W

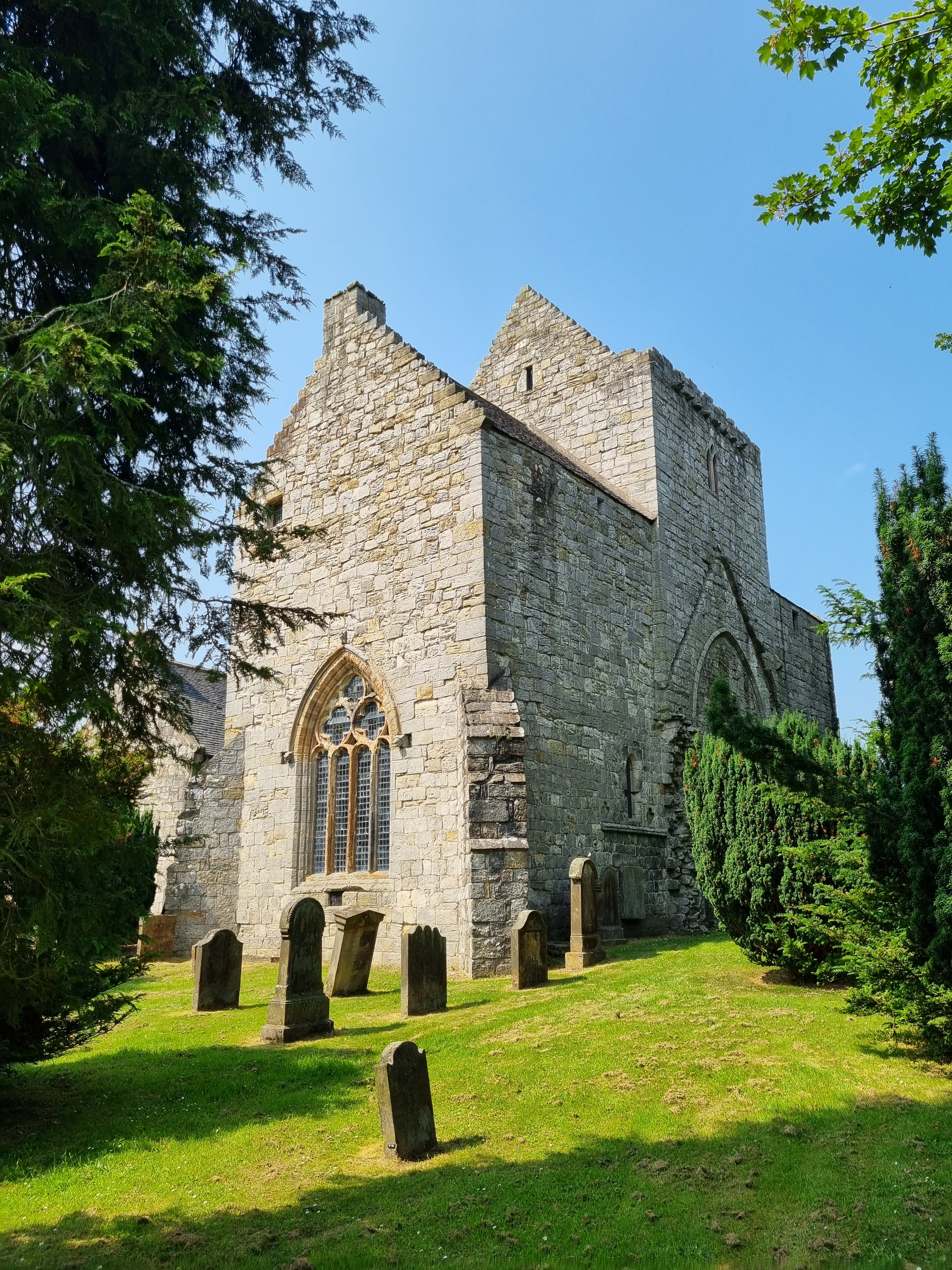

- Location within Scotland Location within the United Kingdom
- Location: Torphichen, West Lothian
- Country: Scotland
- Denomination: Church of Scotland

Architecture
- Years built: 1140s

Torphichen Preceptory is a church in the village of Torphichen, West Lothian, Scotland. It comprises the remains of the preceptory (headquarters) of the Knights Hospitaller of the Order of St John of Jerusalem in Scotland. The placename may be Gaelic in origin, e.g., "Tóir Féichín" (the boundary/sanctuary of St Féichín) or Brythonic, e.g., modern Welsh "tref fechan" (little town). The name "Tóir Féichín" with its Gaelic reference to the Boundary/Sanctuary stones set one mile around the village is most likely the true meaning of the village and Preceptory name rather than the modern Welsh which has no historical precedent that overrides the true meaning of those Neolithic sanctuary stones.

== The Preceptory ==
The Preceptory was built in the 1140s around an existing church, possibly of early Christian origin. During the 13th Century the Preceptory was expanded, and the buildings which still stand were first erected. The complex included a cruciform church, with a nave, central tower, transepts and choir, whose tower and transepts remain, and a number of domestic buildings including a hospital. The church was extended again in the 15th Century, and a cloister completed, of which only the foundations remain. Very unusually, this was situated on the north side of the church (a feature seen elsewhere in Scotland only at Melrose Abbey).

After the Reformation, the nave of the Preceptory church was converted for use as the parish kirk, with the rest of the buildings falling into disrepair. Nevertheless, the surviving crossing of the church (below the central tower) retains some of the best-preserved late 12th-early 13th century masonry in Scotland, with refined architectural detail. In 1756 the nave and domestic buildings were demolished, and a new T-plan kirk built. The kirk is furnished with early 19th Century box pews and galleries. The remnants of the Preceptory were used as a courthouse for a number of years. The central tower was re-roofed in 1947 and is now in the care of Historic Scotland (open in summer; entrance charge).

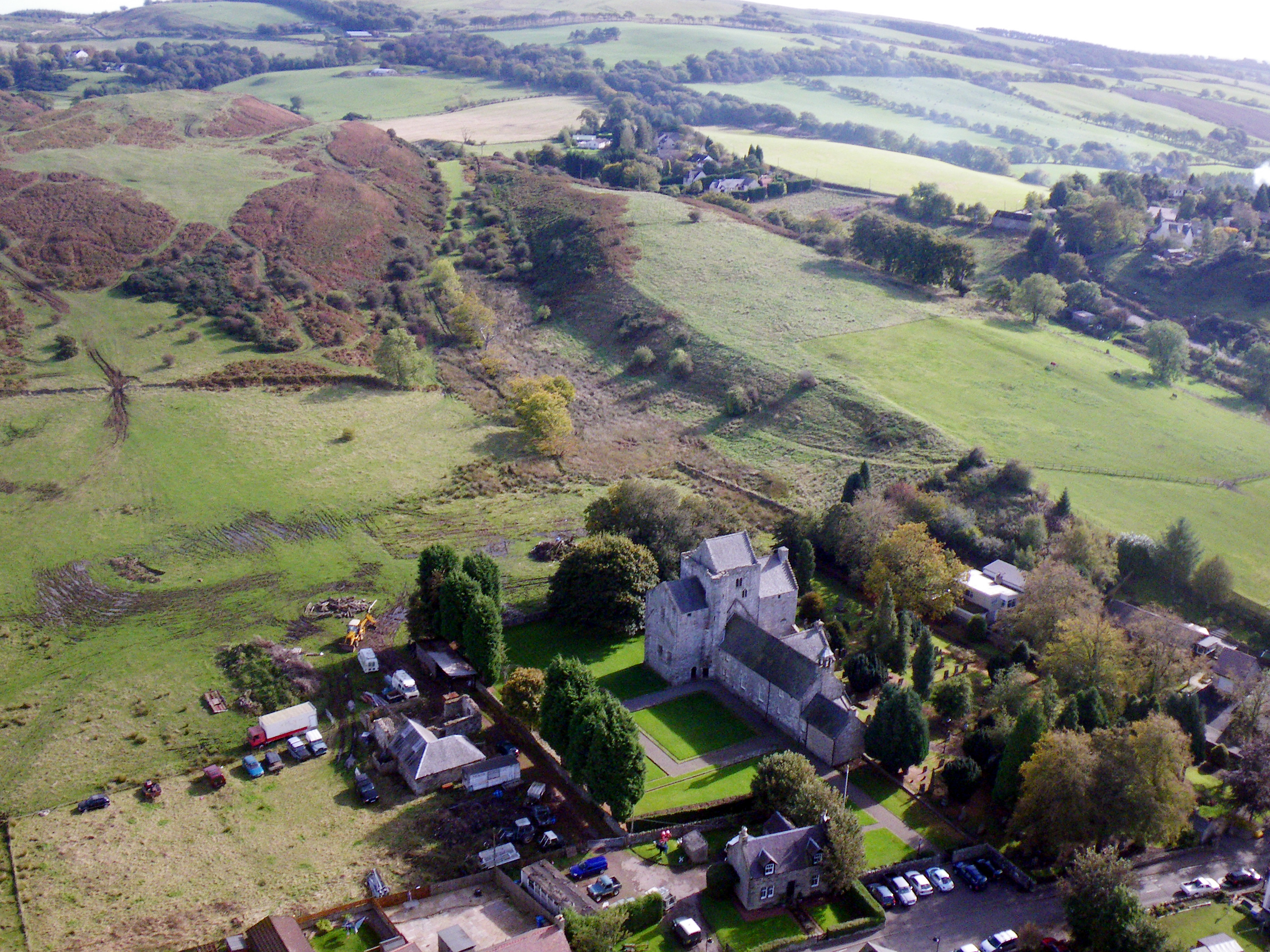
Kite aerial photo of the Preceptory and church.

A 'sanctuary stone' in the kirkyard marks the centre of an 'area of sanctuary' that once extended one Scots mile around. The east and west 'sanctuary stones' still stand in their original positions. It has been suggested that these stones are of much earlier origin than the medieval Preceptory, possibly being related to the important Neolithic henge and burial mound at Cairnpapple Hill, to the east.

The large kirkyard has a collection of 17th–18th century headstones, with much 'folk art', including symbols of mortality, tools representing professions etc.

== The Knights Hospitaller ==
The Knights Hospitaller, established during the Crusades, were invited to Scotland in 1132 by David I. After the suppression of the Knights Templar in 1312, their lands were transferred to the Knights Hospitaller. Torphichen was one of many major Hospitaller sites in Britain, second only to the Priory of Clerkenwell in London, and benefited greatly from this transfer of land.

In 1298, during the Battle of Falkirk, Alexander de Welles, Master of Torphichen Preceptory, was killed. Based on the heraldic evidence there is very little doubt that Alexander de Welles was a member of the Lincolnshire Welle(s) family. Also at Falkirk were Adam de Welle(s) of Lincolnshire and Philip de Welle(s).

The 1764 coat of arms of the Sandilands, Lords Torphichen.

William Wallace held his last parliament here, prior to the Battle of Falkirk in 1298. The only surviving document signed by Wallace as Guardian of Scotland, Custos Regni Scotiae, was prepared here. After the battle, Edward Longshanks (Edward I of England) was brought to the Preceptory for treatment of the injuries caused when his horse stood on him, whilst he was encamped at Polmont before the battle. The Hospitallers fought on the English side during the Wars of Scottish Independence, and withdrew after the Scots victory at Bannockburn, returning during the rule of Robert the Bruce.

The preceptor, Sir William Knollys, served as Lord High Treasurer of Scotland for James III and James IV, was created Lord St. John of Torphichen, and is commonly held to have died at the Battle of Flodden in 1513.

The last Preceptor, Sir James Sandilands, was the second son of James Sandilands, Baron of Calder. Sir James's father and elder brother John had both backed the Lords of the Congregation and were friends of John Knox. In February 1564 Sir James surrendered the Preceptory lands to the Crown, i.e. his relative, Mary, Queen of Scots, whereupon she gave the lands back to him for a payment of 10,000 crowns, with the secular title Lord Torphichen.

The honorary post of Preceptor of Torphichen continues to be used within the modern day Order of St John of Jerusalem.

== See also ==
- Abbeys and priories in Scotland
- Treasurer of Scotland
