= Lord Torphichen =

Title in the Peerage of Scotland

The 1764 coat of arms of Walter Sandilands, Lord Torphichen.

Lord Torphichen or Baron Torphichen (pronounced /ˈtɔːrfɪkən/) is a title in the Peerage of Scotland. It was created by Queen Mary I in 1564 for Sir James Sandilands (to whom she was related) with remainder to heirs and assigns whatsoever.

Some Scottish titles (another title that can choose the heir is Lord Kinloss but there are others) are a rare exception to the typical rule that peerages cannot be transferred and must be inherited. One of the few peerage titles that might be alienated from the bloodline, enabling it to be transferred or passed on to heirs who are not direct descendants.

As of 2017, the title is held by the 15th Lord, who succeeded his father in 1975. He is Chief of Clan Sandilands and also holds the title of Baron of Calder, granted in 1386.

The family seat is Calder House, near Mid Calder, West Lothian.

== History ==
Sir James Sandilands had served as Preceptor to the Knights Hospitaller in Scotland. On 24 January 1564, he received a charter from Queen Mary I that erected his military benefice into a temporal lordship, with remainder to his heirs and assigns whatsoever, after he resigned the entire Torphichen Preceptory in West Lothian to the Crown. This marks him as the inaugural Lord Torphichen.

The newly established lordship encompassed several baronies, including Torphichen, Liston, Balintrode, Tankerton, Denny, Marycoulter, Stenhope, Galtna, and others. These lands were situated across various shires, such as Edinburgh, Peebles, Linlithgow, Stirling, Lanark, and Kincardine, among others. The lordship was officially designated as the Barony and Lordship of Torphichen, complete with the dignities and privileges associated with being a Lord of Parliament.

Following him, all subsequent lords were descendants of the second Lord Torphichen. Notably, the second Lord's great-grandson, who became the seventh Lord, was a fervent advocate for the union with England. His lineage continued to play a significant role in Scottish politics, with his grandson, the ninth Lord, and great-great-grandson, the twelfth Lord, both serving as Scottish representative peers in the House of Lords.

=== Barony of Calder ===
The first Lord was succeeded by his great-nephew, James Sandilands, who held the title of Baron of Calder, making James Sandilands the second Lord. Following this succession, the Lordship of Parliament of Torphichen was officially conjoined with the Barony of Calder, and both titles were descended down the line.

== Lords Torphichen (1564) ==
- James Sandilands, 1st Lord Torphichen (c. 1511–1579), succeeded by his elder brother's grandson
- James Sandilands, 2nd Lord Torphichen (c. 1574–1617)
- James Sandilands, 3rd Lord Torphichen (c. 1597–1622)
- John Sandilands, 4th Lord Torphichen (c. 1598–1637), brother of third Lord
- John Sandilands, 5th Lord Torphichen (1625–1649), died unmarried
- Walter Sandilands, 6th Lord Torphichen (1629–1696), brother of fifth Lord, m. Anne Elphinstone, daughter of Alexander, 6th Lord Elphinstone
- James Sandilands, 7th Lord Torphichen (d. 1753), married Lady Jean Hume, daughter of Patrick, Earl of Marchmont
- Walter Sandilands, 8th Lord Torphichen (1707–1765)
- James Sandilands, 9th Lord Torphichen (1759–1815)
- James Sandilands, 10th Lord Torphichen (1770–1862)
- Robert Sandilands, 11th Lord Torphichen (1807– 24 December 1869), nephew of 10th Lord Torphichen
- James Walter Sandilands, 12th Lord Torphichen (1846–1915)
- John Gordon Sandilands, 13th Lord Torphichen (1886–1973)
- James Bruce Sandilands, 14th Lord Torphichen (1917–1975)
- James Andrew Douglas Sandilands, 15th Lord Torphichen (b. 1946)

The heir presumptive is the present holder's first cousin twice removed Robert Powell Sandilands (b. 1950).
The heir presumptive's heir apparent is his only son Ashton Powell Sandilands (b. 1979).

== Arms ==
Coat of arms of Lord Torphichen
Coronet Coronet of a Baron Crest On a wreath, an eagle displayed pro∣per. Escutcheon Quarterly, 1st and 4th, argent, on a chief azure an imperial crown or, in base a thistle vert flowered gules; 2nd and 3rd, counterquartered; 1st and 4th, argent, a bend azure; 2nd and 3rd, argent, a human heart proper, imperially crowned gules, on a chief azure three mullets of the field. Supporters Two savages wreathed round the loins and temples with oak leaves, holding in the exterior hands clubs all proper. Motto SPERO MELIORA

== See also ==
- Clan Sandilands
- Torphichen Preceptory
