= James Sandilands, 1st Lord Torphichen =

Scottish nobleman (c.1511 – late 16th century)

James Sandilands (c. 1511 – c. 1579 or c. 1596) was a Scottish nobleman. He was the second son of Sir James Sandilands, 7th Baron of Calder. The Barony of Calder had belonged to the Sandilands family since 1348.

== Knight Hospitaller ==
In December 1540 Sandilands was received into the Hospitaller Order of St John of Jerusalem, of Rhodes, and of Malta, which by that time had its headquarters in Malta, and on 3 March 1541 was conferred with the ancientry of Torphichen (and later succeeded to the preceptorship in 1547. The Commander or Prior of the Knights in Scotland was the Preceptor of Torphichen, at that time, Sir Walter Lindsay. Lindsay recommended Sandilands to the Grand Master of the Knights as a potential candidate to succeed him. Sandilands spent the next several years at the headquarters of the Knights at Malta, and validated Lindsay's recommendation. In 1541 he received from the Grand Master the ancianitas (right of expectancy) to the Preceptory and, following the death of Sir Walter Lindsay, succeeded him as Preceptor, authorized by a bull of 2 April 1547. He was invested with both the spirituality and temporality attendant to the position in June 1550.

Despite the religious turmoil of the time, the Knights Hospitaller had managed to retain possession of their benefices in Scotland. In 1560, Sandilands was sent to France by the Parliament of Scotland to present the proposed Treaty of Edinburgh to Mary, Queen of Scots, and obtain her acquiescence in termination of the alliance between France and Scotland. His mission was a failure.

On 24 January 1563, Sandilands appeared before Mary, Queen of Scots, at the behest of the Grand Preceptory, to surrender the lands and possessions of the Order, together with the title of Lord St. John, which he had held as Preceptor. The Queen accepted them and, showing her high regard for him, returned to him at a bargain price the lands of Torphichen, and conferred upon him the title of Lord Torphichen.

== Sandilands and the belongings of Mary, Queen of Scots ==
In April 1573, James Sandilands was summoned by the Lord Advocate to be questioned by the Privy Council of Scotland and Regent Morton about the possessions of Mary, Queen of Scots. Sandilands related that Mary's valet, Servais de Condé had asked him to look after some belongings of the queen's uncle, Francis, the Grand Prior (1534-1563). These items were put in Sandiland's chamber in Holyrood Palace. During a plague scare in the Canongate the items were moved to Sandilands' house at Torphichen. Subsequently, Sandilands was abducted from his house at Torphichen (Calder House, near Mid Calder) with these possessions by the Hamilton family and taken to Hamilton Palace. Regent Moray mentioned this incident in a letter to Elizabeth I on 11 March 1569, as the "taking the Lord of St John, a peaceable and honest gentleman forth of his own house, who also was spoiled of all his goods".

The royal possessions at Hamilton were returned to Holyrood Abbey by the forces of the young James VI and I. Sandilands said that Servais de Condé received, "so many books, and such moveables, which were all dispersed, dimembered, and spoilt by the soldiers, and [by] harling them on sleds through the foul moors and taking no accompt of the keeping of them when they were in Hamilton". The goods included a suite of five pieces of tapestry. Regent Lennox questioned Sandilands about the return of the items that Servais had left with him.

Mary had owed Sandilands some money, and he asked Servais and his nephew Bennoust Garroust to reserve some furnishings at Holyrood to him as security, including the tapestry that had retrieved from Hamilton, parts of black velvet bed, and red bed hangings and red velvet roof for a bed. Sandilands declared that his possessions were now in his lodgings at Leith, in Calder, or at a friends house in Fife. Various witnesses were called to testify about potential royal possessions they had seen in Sandiland's houses. One said that Sandilands always had plenty of books. Another explained that Mary had allowed Sandilands some of her furnishings while she herself was imprisoned at Lochleven Castle, and Sandilands was ill at Holyrood.

== Family ==
James Sandilands married Janet Murray, daughter of William Murray of Polmaise. James died without children at Hallyards Castle on 29 September 1579. Janet Murray remained at Hallyards and married John Graham, who later adopted the title John Graham, Lord Hallyards. He feuded with Sir James Sandilands of Slamannan, who was the legal tutor or guardian of the heir.

James Sandilands is thought to have died in 1579, and was succeeded by his grand-nephew James Sandilands of Calder. Janet Murray died on 29 November 1596, which some historical books have given as an alternative date of James' death.

The title of 'Lord Torphichen' thus passed to the nearest of his designated heirs: the grandson of his elder brother, also named James Sandilands (born 1574), then Baron of Calder, who became the 2nd Lord Torphichen. Thereafter the two titles of Baron of Calder and Lord Torphichen were conjoined, and inherited by the 2nd Lord Torphichen's successors up until the present day (15th Lord Torphichen).

== Notes ==
Peerage of Scotland
New creation	Lord Torphichen; 1564–1579	Succeeded by James Sandilands
