= West Lothian Council elections =

Local government elections in West Lothian, Scotland

West Lothian Council in Scotland holds elections every five years, previously holding them every four years from its creation as a single-tier authority in 1995 to 2007.

== Council elections ==
=== As a district council ===
| Year | SNP | Labour | Conservative | Ratepayers | Independent |
| 1974 | 6 | 12 | 0 | 1 | 2 |
| 1977 | 9 | 9 | 0 | 2 | 1 |
| 1980 | 4 | 15 | 0 | 0 | 2 |
| 1984 (Note: New ward boundaries.) | 2 | 19 | 0 | 2 | 1 |
| 1988 | 7 | 14 | 0 | 1 | 2 |
| 1992 | 11 | 10 | 2 | 0 | 1 |

=== As a unitary authority ===
| Year | SNP | Labour | Conservative | Liberal Democrats | Action to Save St John's Hospital | Independent |
| 1995 | 11 | 15 | 1 | 0 | 0 | 0 |
| 1999 (Note: New ward boundaries.) | 11 | 20 | 1 | 0 | 0 | 0 |
| 2003 | 12 | 18 | 1 | 0 | 0 | 1 |
| 2007 (Note: Change to single transferable vote system and new ward boundaries.) | 13 | 14 | 1 | 0 | 3 | 1 |
| 2012 | 15 | 16 | 1 | 0 | 0 | 1 |
| 2017 (Note: New ward boundaries.) | 13 | 12 | 7 | 0 | 0 | 1 |
| 2022 | 15 | 12 | 4 | 1 | 0 | 1 |

== Results maps ==
2003 results map

2007 results map

2012 results map

2017 results map

2022 results map

== By-elections ==
=== 2012-2017 ===
Armadale and Blackridge By-Election 26 March 2015
| Party | Candidate | FPv% | Count | | | |
| Party | Candidate | FPv% | 1 | 2 | 3 | 4 |
|---|---|---|---|---|---|---|
| SNP | Sarah King | 43.4 | 1,620 | 1,647 | 1,676 | 1,874 |
| Labour | Andrew McGuire | 27.0 | 1,009 | 1,018 | 1,074 | 1,382 |
| Independent | Scott Mackay | 20.3 | 756 | 786 | 868 | |
| Conservative | Ian Burgess | 6.8 | 255 | 264 | | |
| Green | Jenny Johnson | 2.4 | 90 | | | |
| SNP hold | | | | | | |
Valid: 3,730 Spoilt: 46 Quota: 1,866 Turnout: 3,776

Linlithgow By-Election 1 October 2015
| Party | Candidate | FPv% | Count | | | | |
| Party | Candidate | FPv% | 1 | 2 | 3 | 4 | 5 |
|---|---|---|---|---|---|---|---|
| SNP | David Tait | 43.1 | 2,049 | 2,061 | 2,099 | 2,234 | 2,325 |
| Labour | David Manion | 22.9 | 1,088 | 1,131 | 1,175 | 1,279 | 1,644 |
| Conservative | Ian Burgess | 20.5 | 973 | 992 | 1,056 | 1,070 | |
| Green | Maire McCormack | 5.9 | 282 | 303 | 346 | | |
| Independent | Brenda Galloway | 4.8 | 230 | 246 | | | |
| Liberal Democrats | Caron Lindsay | 2.8 | 133 | | | | |
| SNP hold | | | | | | | |
Valid: 4,755 Spoilt: 28 Quota: 2,378 Turnout: 4,783

=== 2017-2022 ===
Livingston South By-Election 11 March 2021
| Party | Candidate | FPv% | Count | | | | | | |
| Party | Candidate | FPv% | 1 | 2 | 3 | 4 | 5 | 6 | 7 |
|---|---|---|---|---|---|---|---|---|---|
| SNP | Maria MacAulay | 43.9 | 2,465 | 2,467 | 2,496 | 2,603 | 2,703 | 2,763 | 3,370 |
| Labour | Gordon Connolly | 24.6 | 1,382 | 1,384 | 1,419 | 1,481 | 1,579 | 2,098 | |
| Conservative | Douglas Smith | 17.6 | 989 | 996 | 1,025 | 1,037 | 1,124 | | |
| Independent | Eddie Millar | 5.9 | 332 | 338 | 365 | 413 | | | |
| Green | Cameron Glasgow | 4.2 | 234 | 234 | 273 | | | | |
| Liberal Democrats | Caron Lindsay | 3.3 | 185 | 186 | | | | | |
| UKIP | John Mumford | 0.5 | 29 | | | | | | |
| SNP hold | | | | | | | | | |
Valid: 5,616 Spoilt: 52 Quota: 2,809 Turnout: 5,668

East Livingston and East Calder By-Election 5 August 2021
| Party | Candidate | FPv% | Count | | | | |
| Party | Candidate | FPv% | 1 | 2 | 3 | 4 | 5 |
|---|---|---|---|---|---|---|---|
| SNP | Thomas Ullathorne | 42.5 | 1,890 | 1,906 | 1,918 | 2,122 | 2,368 |
| Conservative | David Philip | 24.4 | 1,085 | 1,088 | 1,103 | 1,131 | 1,425 |
| Labour | Danny Logue | 21.8 | 969 | 972 | 1,012 | 1,094 | |
| Green | Neal Drummond | 7.6 | 336 | 343 | 377 | | |
| Liberal Democrats | Hans Edginton | 2.7 | 118 | 122 | | | |
| ISP | John Hannah | 1.1 | 47 | | | | |
| SNP gain from Labour | | | | | | | |
Valid: 4,445 Spoilt: 48 Quota: 2,223 Turnout: 4,493

=== 2022-2027 ===
Broxburn, Uphall and Winchburgh By-Election 1 December 2022
| Party | Candidate | FPv% | Count | | | | | | | |
| Party | Candidate | FPv% | 1 | 2 | 3 | 4 | 5 | 6 | 7 | 8 |
|---|---|---|---|---|---|---|---|---|---|---|
| Labour | Tony Boyle | 39.8 | 1,783 | 1,790 | 1,809 | 1,839 | 1,912 | 2,016 | 2,191 | 2,778 |
| SNP | Thomas Ullathorne | 35.2 | 1,576 | 1,605 | 1,671 | 1,703 | 1,728 | 1,772 | 1,792 | |
| Conservative | Douglas Smith | 7.8 | 347 | 348 | 349 | 354 | 381 | 458 | | |
| Independent | Chris Horne | 6.1 | 275 | 285 | 292 | 328 | 353 | | | |
| Liberal Democrats | Peter Clarke | 3.7 | 167 | 168 | 183 | 191 | | | | |
| Independent | Steven Laidlaw | 2.8 | 125 | 132 | 136 | | | | | |
| Green | Chris Cotter | 2.7 | 122 | 126 | | | | | | |
| Alba | Debbie Ewen | 1.8 | 29 | | | | | | | |
| Labour hold | | | | | | | | | | |
Valid: 4,476 Spoilt: 24 Quota: 2,239 Turnout: 4,500

Armadale and Blackridge By-Election 22 August 2024
| Party | Candidate | FPv% | Count | | | | | | |
| Party | Candidate | FPv% | 1 | 2 | 3 | 4 | 5 | 6 | 7 |
|---|---|---|---|---|---|---|---|---|---|
| Labour | Susan Manion | 28.9 | 795 | 814 | 853 | 890 | 955 | 1,103 | 1,427 |
| SNP | Keith Alan Barclay | 28.3 | 777 | 805 | 820 | 903 | 917 | 967 | |
| Reform | David McLennan | 18.9 | 519 | 519 | 534 | 559 | 637 | | |
| Conservative | Douglas Smith | 8.2 | 226 | 227 | 248 | 272 | | | |
| ISP | John Hannah | 8.6 | 236 | 240 | 245 | | | | |
| Liberal Democrats | Douglas Thomas Butler | 4.4 | 122 | 131 | | | | | |
| Green | Adam William Rafferty | 2.7 | 73 | | | | | | |
| Labour gain from Independent | | | | | | | | | |
Electorate: 13,371 Valid: 2,748 Spoilt: 22 Quota: 1,375 Turnout: 2,770

Whitburn and Blackburn By-Election 14 November 2024
| Party | Candidate | FPv% | Count | | | | | | |
| Party | Candidate | FPv% | 1 | 2 | 3 | 4 | 5 | 6 | 7 |
|---|---|---|---|---|---|---|---|---|---|
| Labour | David Russell | 30.9 | 1,093 | 1,108 | 1,126 | 1,164 | 1,283 | 1,424 | 1,778 |
| SNP | Aileen Brown | 28.9 | 1,022 | 1,063 | 1,078 | 1,091 | 1,173 | 1,238 | |
| Reform | David McLennan | 16.3 | 578 | 579 | 586 | 653 | 739 | | |
| Independent | Thomas Robert Lynch | 11.9 | 421 | 429 | 452 | 498 | | | |
| Conservative | Charles Kennedy | 6.7 | 239 | 239 | 259 | | | | |
| Liberal Democrats | Douglas Thomas Butler | 2.7 | 97 | 111 | | | | | |
| Green | Cameron Glasgow | 2.6 | 92 | | | | | | |
| Labour hold | | | | | | | | | |
Valid: 3,542 Spoilt: 35 Quota: 1,772 Turnout: 3,577

Broxburn, Uphall and Winchburgh By-Election 13 March 2025
| Party | Candidate | FPv% | Count | | | | | | |
| Party | Candidate | FPv% | 1 | 2 | 3 | 4 | 5 | 6 | 7 |
|---|---|---|---|---|---|---|---|---|---|
| SNP | Mike Carlin | 31.8 | 1,375 | 1,428 | 1,504 | 1,550 | 1,571 | 1,672 | 2,126 |
| Labour | June Andrews | 29.2 | 1,263 | 1,273 | 1,310 | 1,397 | 1,491 | 1,655 | |
| Reform | David McLennan | 18.7 | 809 | 826 | 832 | 851 | 943 | | |
| Conservative | Mamie Taylor | 7.5 | 324 | 326 | 330 | 363 | | | |
| Liberal Democrats | Oliver Thomas Ferrario | 5.3 | 229 | 235 | 274 | | | | |
| Green | Chris Cotter | 4.3 | 185 | 195 | | | | | |
| Alba | Frank Anderson | 3.1 | 135 | | | | | | |
| SNP hold | | | | | | | | | |
Valid: 4,320 Spoilt: 37 Quota: 2,161 Turnout: 4,357

Whitburn and Blackburn By-Election 11 December 2025
| Party | Candidate | FPv% | Count | | | | | | | |
| Party | Candidate | FPv% | 1 | 2 | 3 | 4 | 5 | 6 | 7 | 8 |
|---|---|---|---|---|---|---|---|---|---|---|
| Reform | David McLennan | 32.0 | 1,177 | 1,180 | 1,185 | 1,191 | 1,231 | 1,321 | 1,411 | 1,653 |
| SNP | Callum Cox | 28.0 | 1,028 | 1,028 | 1,071 | 1,101 | 1,110 | 1,230 | 1,387 | |
| Labour | Samual McCulloch | 17.1 | 627 | 631 | 636 | 655 | 683 | 762 | | |
| Independent | Thomas Robert Lynch | 13.2 | 484 | 497 | 505 | 530 | 549 | | | |
| Conservative | Reece Sinnott | 3.5 | 129 | 129 | 130 | 142 | | | | |
| Liberal Democrats | Douglas Thomas Butler | 2.8 | 102 | 104 | 121 | | | | | |
| Green | Robbie Gerald Walker | 2.7 | 101 | 102 | | | | | | |
| Independent | Eddie Millar | 0.7 | 27 | | | | | | | |
| Reform gain from Labour | | | | | | | | | | |
Valid: 3,675 Spoilt: 44 Quota: 1,838 Turnout: 3,719
