= Action to Save St. John's Hospital =

- Leader: Ashok Joseph Jacob
- Founder: Ernie Walker
- Founded: 2007
- Dissolved: 2021
- Headquarters: 19 Wilton Road, Edinburgh, Midlothian, EH16 5NX
- Ideology: Single-issue
- West Lothian Council: 3 / 32 (2007–2012)
- Politics of Scotland; Political parties; Elections; All uncited information above is from the Electoral Commission.

Action to Save St. John's Hospital was a single-issue political party operating in West Lothian which contested the local council elections in 2007 and 2012. Their sole focus was campaigning against the planned removal of the 24-hour emergency department, paediatric and maternity services from St John's Hospital in Livingston.

== Electoral Performance ==
The party fielded candidates in six out of nine multi-member wards in the 2007 West Lothian Council election, winning three out of the 32 seats on the council to become the third-largest party behind the SNP and Labour. However, they received fewer overall votes than the Conservatives with 3,997 votes versus the Conservatives' 6,142.

The party's three successful candidates were Ellen Glass in Broxburn, Uphall and Winchburgh with 14.2% of first-preference votes (FPV), Gordon Beurskens in Whitburn and Blackburn (11.7% FPV), and John Cochrane in Livingston North (9.9% FPV).

Following the election, the party entered into a coalition administration with the SNP and Conservatives, taking control of West Lothian council from Labour, ending 12 years of Labour majority administration since the councils establishment in 1995.

In the 2012 West Lothian Council election, the party stood candidates in every ward except Armadale and Blackridge. The party saw a 0.6% increase in council-wide vote share. Despite this, they lost all three of their seats. The party vowed to continue their campaign despite the results.

The party did not contest the 2017 West Lothian Council election or any council by-elections and officially deregistered in 2021, ahead of the 2022 West Lothian Council election.

== Dissolution ==
The party voluntarily deregistered on 8 August 2021.

== See also ==
- Borders Party
- Independent Community & Health Concern
- Ratepayers' association
- Aspire (political party)
