= Bathgate (Scottish Parliament constituency) =

Constituency of the Scottish Parliament

- County constituency for the Scottish Parliament
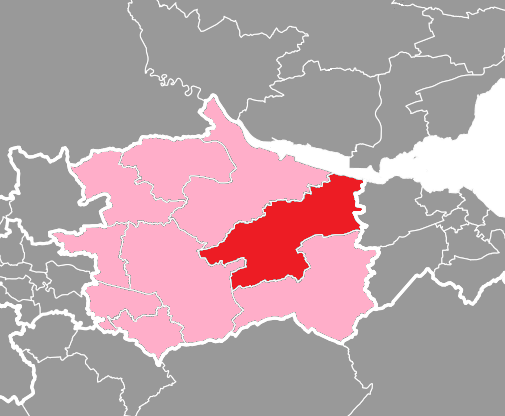

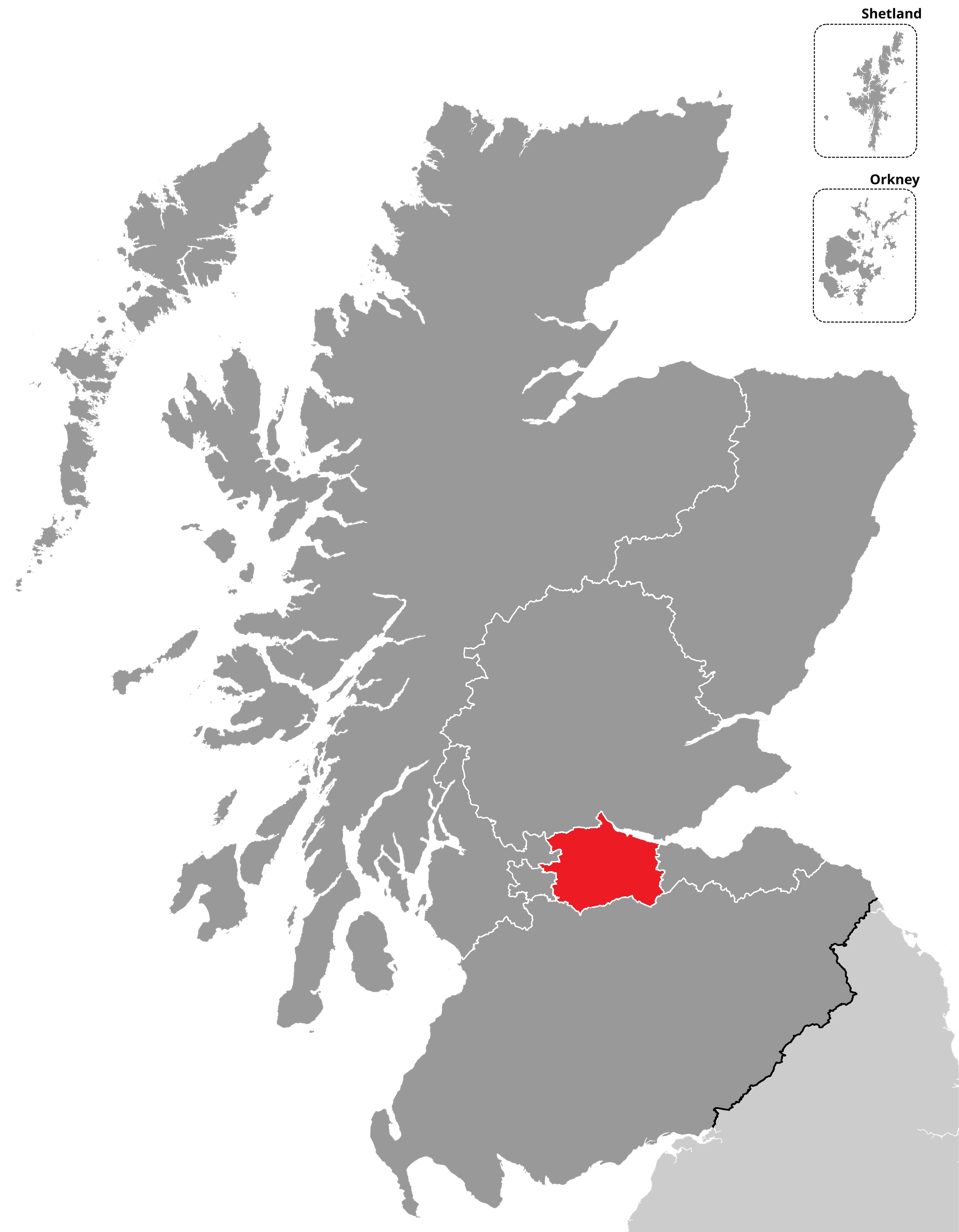
- Bathgate shown within the Central Scotland and Lothians West electoral region, and the region shown within Scotland
- Electoral region: Central Scotland and Lothians West
- Electorate: 68,052 (2026)
- Major settlements: Bathgate

Current constituency
- Created: 2026
- Seats: 1
- Party: Scottish National Party
- MSP: Pauline Stafford
- Council area: West Lothian
- Created from: Linlithgow

Bathgate is a county constituency of the Scottish Parliament covering part of West Lothian. It elects one Member of the Scottish Parliament (MSP) by the first past the post method of election. Under the additional-member electoral system used for elections to the Scottish Parliament, it also forms one of the nine constituencies in the Central Scotland and Lothians West electoral region, which elects seven additional members, in addition to the nine constituency MSPs, to produce a form of proportional representation for the region as a whole.

The constituency was created ahead of the 2026 Scottish Parliament election, and covers areas that were formerly within the Linlithgow constituency. It has been held by Pauline Stafford of the Scottish National Party since its creation.

== Electoral region ==
The other eight constituencies of the Central Scotland and Lothians West region are Airdrie, Almond Valley, Coatbridge and Chryston, Cumbernauld and Kilsyth, Falkirk East and Linlithgow, Falkirk West, Motherwell and Wishaw, and Uddingston and Bellshill. The region includes all of the Falkirk, North Lanarkshire and West Lothian council areas, and parts of the South Lanarkshire council area.

== Constituency boundaries and council area ==
The Bathgate constituency was created by the second periodic review of Scottish Parliament boundaries, and was first contested at the 2026 Scottish Parliament election. It is based on the town of Bathgate, which was formerly in the constituency of Linlithgow; other settlements within the seat include Armadale, Broxburn and Whitburn. It lies entirely within the West Lothian council area, and covers the entirety of the West Lothian Council wards of Broxburn, Uphall and Winchburgh, Whitburn and Blackburn, Bathgate, and Armadale and Blackridge, and part of the Linlithgow ward.

== Member of the Scottish Parliament ==
Election	Member	Party
2026	Pauline Stafford	SNP

== Election results ==
=== 2020s ===
2026 Scottish Parliament election: Bathgate (Note: Note that changes in vote share are shown with respect to the notional result of the 2021 election, calculated to account for boundary changes)
Party	Candidate	Constituency			Regional		
Party	Candidate	Votes	%	±%	Votes	%	±%
SNP	Pauline Stafford	13,594	40.7	▼8.4	9,961	29.7	N/A
Labour	Jenny Young (Note: Elected on the party list)	8,007	24.0	▼2.8	6,548	19.6	N/A
Reform	David McLennan	7,511	22.5	New	7,496	22.5	N/A
Green					3,734	11.2	N/A
Conservative	Peter Heggie	2,091	6.3	▼13.6	2,450	7.3	N/A
Liberal Democrats	Stephen Harte	1,937	5.8	▲1.6	1,812	5.4	N/A
Independent Green Voice					339	1.0	N/A
Scottish Family					275	0.8	N/A
BUP	Gus Ferguson	227	0.7	New			
AtLS					195	0.6	N/A
ISP					165	0.5	N/A
Scottish Socialist					130	0.4	N/A
Abolish the Scottish Parliament					120	0.4	N/A
Workers Party					77	0.2	N/A
Advance UK					56	0.2	N/A
Scottish Libertarian					31	0.1	N/A
UKIP					20	0.1	N/A
Majority		5,587	16.7	N/A			
Valid votes		33,367			33,340		
Invalid votes		112			69		
Turnout		33,432	49.1	N/A	33,409	49.1	N/A
SNP win (new boundaries)							

== See also ==
- List of Scottish Parliament constituencies and electoral regions (2026–)
