= Bathgate and Linlithgow =

UK Parliament constituency (since 2024)

- County constituency for the House of Commons
- Interactive map of boundaries from 2024
- Boundary of Bathgate and Linlithgow in Scotland
- Subdivisions of Scotland: West Lothian and Falkirk
- Electorate: 71,650 (March 2020)
- Major settlements: Bathgate, Linlithgow, Whitburn, Winchburgh

Current constituency
- Created: 2024
- Member of Parliament: Kirsteen Sullivan (Labour)
- Seats: One
- Created from: Linlithgow and East Falkirk & Livingston

Bathgate and Linlithgow is a constituency of the House of Commons in the UK Parliament. Further to the completion of the 2023 review of Westminster constituencies, it was first contested at the 2024 general election, when it was won by Kirsteen Sullivan of the Labour Party.

The constituency name refers to the West Lothian towns of Bathgate and Linlithgow.

== Boundaries ==
The constituency comprises the following:

- In full: the Falkirk Council ward of Bo'ness and Blackness; and the West Lothian Council wards of Armadale and Blackridge, Bathgate, Linlithgow, and Whitburn and Blackburn
- In part: the West Lothian council ward of Broxburn, Uphall and Winchburgh (the village of Winchburgh).

The vast majority of the constituency comes from the abolished constituency of Linlithgow and East Falkirk, with small areas being transferred from Livingston.

== Members of Parliament ==
Election	Member	Party
2024	Kirsteen Sullivan	Labour Co-op

== Election results ==
=== Elections in the 2020s ===
General election 2024: Bathgate and Linlithgow
Party	Candidate	Votes	%	±%
Labour Co-op	Kirsteen Sullivan	19,774	47.0	+28.2
SNP	Martyn Day	11,451	27.2	−15.8
Reform UK	Jamie McNamee	3,524	8.4	+6.5
Conservative	Lynn Munro	3,144	7.5	−17.1
Liberal Democrats	Sally Pattle	2,171	5.2	−3.0
Green	Simon Jay	1,390	3.3	+1.1
ISP	John Hannah	382	0.9	N/A
Independent	Stuart James McArthur	229	0.5	N/A
Majority		8,323	19.8	N/A
Turnout		42,065	58.3	−7.6
Registered electors		72,185		
Labour Co-op gain from SNP		Swing	+12.4	

=== Elections in the 2010s ===
2019 notional result (Note: Estimate of the 2019 general election result as if the revised boundaries recommended under the 2023 boundary review were in place)
Party	Vote	%
SNP	20,306	43.0
Conservative	11,635	24.6
Labour	8,874	18.8
Liberal Democrats	3,881	8.2
Scottish Greens	1,029	2.2
Brexit Party	904	1.9
Other	588	1.2
Majority	8,671	18.4
Turnout	47,217	65.9
Electorate	71,650	
