= Fauldhouse and the Breich Valley (ward) =

Local council ward in Scotland

Location of the ward

Fauldhouse and the Breich Valley is one of the nine wards used to elect members of the West Lothian Council in Scotland. It elects three Councillors.

== Councillors ==
Election	Councillors		
2007	Greg McCarra (SNP)	Cathy Muldoon (Labour)	Neil Findlay (Labour)
2012	Greg McCarra (SNP)	Cathy Muldoon (Labour)	David Dodds (Labour)
2017	Pauline Clark (SNP)	Cathy Muldoon (Labour)	David Dodds (Labour)
2022	Pauline Clark (SNP)	Cathy Muldoon (Labour)	Craig Meek (Labour)

== Election results ==
=== 2022 Election ===
2022 West Lothian Council election

Fauldhouse and the Breich Valley - 3 seats
Party	Candidate	FPv%	Count						
Party	Candidate	FPv%	1	2	3	4	5	6	7
SNP	Pauline Clark (incumbent)	25.47%	1,292						
Labour	Cathy Muldoon (incumbent)	21.94%	1,113	1,114	1,123	1,158	1,202	1,363	
Labour	Craig Meek	18.22%	924	925	930	948	975	1,219	1,295
Conservative	Elaine Fairbairn	14.16%	718	718	720	740	754		
SNP	Greg McCarra	12.85%	652	671	693	700	778	801	804
Scottish Green	Neil Barnes	3.65%	185	186	197	216			
Liberal Democrats	Gillian Pattle	2.33%	118	118	127				
Alba	Hani Mohamed	1.38%	70	70					
Electorate: 12,714 Valid: 5,072 Spoilt: 148 Quota: 1,269 Turnout: 41.1%

=== 2017 election ===
2017 West Lothian Council election

Fauldhouse and the Breich Valley - 3 seats
Party	Candidate	FPv%	Count					
Party	Candidate	FPv%	1	2	3	4	5	6
Labour	David Dodds (incumbent)	29.81%	1,623					
SNP	Pauline Clark	18.53%	1,012	1,022	1,035	1,079	1,781	
Labour	Cathy Muldoon (incumbent)	17.68%	966	1,070	1,206	1,233	1,293	1,417
Conservative	Marion Kerr	15.23%	832	842	867	892	896	920
SNP	Greg McCarra (incumbent)	14.33%	783	787	794	817		
Scottish Green	Pamela Barnes	2.25%	123	128	162			
Liberal Democrats	Kenneth Brown	2.27%	124	127				
Electorate: TBC Valid: 5,463 Spoilt: 159 Quota: 1,366 Turnout: 46.6%

=== 2012 election ===
2012 West Lothian Council election

Fauldhouse and the Breich Valley - 3 seats
Party	Candidate	FPv%	Count					
Party	Candidate	FPv%	1	2	3	4	5	6
Labour	David Dodds	33.30	1,713					
SNP	Garry Knox	17.57	904	929.6	949.1	1,023.6	1,039.2	
Labour	Cathy Muldoon (incumbent)	17.53	902	1,235.7	1,264.5	1,423.6		
SNP	Greg McCarra (incumbent)	17.42	896	905.7	931.2	1,063.7	1,085.5	1,999.8
Action to Save St John's Hospital	Jim Warnock	10.34	532	557.4	647.6			
Conservative	Alastair Lowrie	3.83	197	202.5				
Electorate: 11,239 Valid: 5,144 Spoilt: 106 Quota: 1,287 Turnout: 5,250 (45.77%)

=== 2007 election ===
2007 West Lothian Council election

Fauldhouse and the Breich Valley - 3 seats
Party	Candidate	FPv%	%	Seat	Count
Labour	Neil Findlay	2,137	33.8	1	1
SNP	Greg McCarra	1,669	26.4	2	1
Labour	Cathy Muldoon	1,340	21.1	3	4
Conservative	Shiela Grierson	335	5.3		
Action to Save St John's Hospital	Tom Orr	319	5.0		
Independent	James Ford	203	3.2		
Liberal Democrats	Graham Wenham	184	2.9		
Scottish Socialist	Alun Birrell	139	2.2		
