= 2022 West Lothian Council election =

2022 Scottish local government election

- 5 May 2022

All 33 seats to West Lothian Council 17 seats needed for a majority
| | First party | Second party | Third party |
|---|---|---|---|
| Leader | Janet Campbell | Lawrence Fitzpatrick | Damian Timson |
| Party | SNP | Labour | Conservative |
| Leader's seat | Broxburn, Uphall and Winchburgh | Livingston South | East Calder and East Livingston |
| Last election | 13 seats, 37.3% | 12 seats, 29.0% | 7 seats, 23.2% |
| Seats before | 14 | 10 | 8 |
| Seats won | 15 | 12 | 4 |
| Seat change | ▲2 | Steady | ▼3 |
| Popular vote | 22,424 | 16,921 | 9,427 |
| Percentage | 37.9% | 28.6% | 15.9% |
| Swing | ▲0.6% | ▼0.5% | ▼7.3% |
| | Fourth party | Fifth party |
| Party | Independent | Liberal Democrats |
| Last election | 1 seat, 4.9% | 0 seats, 2.6% |
| Seats before | 1 | 0 |
| Seats won | 1 | 1 |
| Seat change | Steady | ▲1 |
| Popular vote | 3,775 | 2,831 |
| Percentage | 6.4% | 4.8% |
| Swing | ▲1.4% | ▲2.2% |

Council Leader before election
Lawrence Fitzpatrick
Labour
Council Leader after election
Lawrence Fitzpatrick
Labour

The 2022 West Lothian Council election was held on 5 May 2022, on the same day as the 31 other local authorities in Scotland. The election used the nine wards created under the Local Governance (Scotland) Act 2004, with 33 Councillors elected. Each ward elects either 3 or 4 members, using the STV electoral system - a form of proportional representation.

Following the election, it was announced Labour would run the council as a minority administration with loose coalition support from the four Conservative councillors, the independent councillor Stuart Borrowman and Liberal Democrat councillor Sally Pattle.

== Background ==
=== Previous election ===
At the previous election in 2017, the Scottish National Party (SNP) won the most seats, forming the largest block, but were 4 seats short of a majority. Close behind the SNP were Labour, who won the next largest amount of seats, winning 12. The Conservatives won 7 seats, gaining 6 seats and increasing their vote share by 14.3%. The sole independent, Stuart Borrowman also held his seat. Following the result, the Labour and Conservative groups worked together in the chamber to hold a majority, although both parties denied this claim. This agreement led to Labour councillor Lawrence Fitzpatrick being appointed Council Leader and Conservative councillor Tom Kerr was appointed Provost of West Lothian. However, in November 2021, SNP councillors tabled a motion of no-confidence against Cllr Fitzpatrick's administration. The motion failed following support from the Conservatives.

2017 West Lothian Council election result
| Party | Seats | Vote share |
|---|---|---|
| SNP | 13 | 37.3% |
| Labour | 12 | 29.0% |
| Conservative | 7 | 23.2% |
| Independent | 1 | 5.0% |

=== Electoral system ===
The election used the 9 wards created following the fifth statutory review of electoral arrangements conducted by Local Government Boundary Commission for Scotland in 2016, with 33 councillors elected. Each ward elected either three or four councillors, using the single transferable vote (STV) electoral system – a form of proportional representation – where candidates are ranked in order of preference.

=== Composition ===
There were two by-elections in 2021 which saw each main party field candidates. The Livingston South by-election held in March 2021 following the retirement of SNP councillor Peter Johnston resulted in the SNP retaining the seat. Meanwhile in the October 2021 East Livingston and East Calder by-election which was called following the death of Labour councillor Dave King resulted in a gain for the SNP. In the weeks following the by-election Labour councillor Angela Doran-Timson joined the Conservatives.

Composition of West Lothian Council
| Party | 2017 election | Dissolution |
|---|---|---|
| SNP | 13 | 14 |
| Labour | 12 | 10 |
| Conservatives | 7 | 8 |
| Independent | 1 | 1 |

=== Retiring Councillors ===
Retiring councillors
| Council Ward | Party | Retiring Councillor |
|---|---|---|
| Linlithgow | Conservative | Tom Kerr |
| Linlithgow | SNP | David Tait |
| Livingston North | Labour | Dom McGuire |
| Fauldhouse and the Breich Valley | Labour | David Dodds |
| Bathgate | Labour | John McGinty |
| Armadale and Blackridge | SNP | Sarah King |

SNP councillor Frank Anderson was deselected by his party. He announced that he would stand as an independent candidate in East Livingston and East Calder.

=== Candidates ===
The total number of candidates increased from 67 in 2017 to 73. Like in 2017, the SNP stood the most candidates at 17, a decrease of 6, while Labour stood 16. The Conservatives, the Liberal Democrats, and Greens stood 9 candidates each. Unlike in 2017, the Scottish Family Party, Alba and the Independence for Scotland Party stood candidates, standing 5, 3 and 1 respectively. There were 4 independent candidates, an increase of 2.

== Results ==
2022 West Lothian Council election result
| Party | Seats | Gains | Losses | Net gain/loss | Seats % | Votes % | Votes | +/− |
|---|---|---|---|---|---|---|---|---|
| SNP | 15 | 2 | 0 | ▲2 | 45.5 | 37.9 | 22,424 | ▲0.6 |
| Labour | 12 | 0 | 0 | Steady | 36.4 | 28.6 | 16,921 | ▼0.5 |
| Conservative | 4 | 0 | 3 | ▼3 | 12.1 | 15.9 | 9,427 | ▼7.3 |
| Independent | 1 | 0 | 0 | Steady | 3.0 | 6.4 | 3,775 | ▲1.4 |
| Liberal Democrats | 1 | 1 | 0 | ▲1 | 3.0 | 4.8 | 2,831 | ▲2.2 |
| Green | 0 | 0 | 0 | Steady | 0.0 | 5.3 | 3,119 | ▲2.6 |
| Scottish Family | 0 | 0 | 0 | Steady | 0.0 | 0.8 | 457 | New |
| Alba | 0 | 0 | 0 | Steady | 0.0 | 0.4 | 232 | New |
| ISP | 0 | 0 | 0 | Steady | 0.0 | 0.1 | 43 | New |
| Total | 33 | | | | | | 59,229 | |

Note: Votes are the sum of first preference votes across all council wards. The net gain/loss and percentage changes relate to the result of the previous Scottish local elections on 4 May 2017. This is because STV has an element of proportionality which is not present unless multiple seats are being elected. This may differ from other published sources showing gain/loss relative to seats held at the dissolution of Scotland's councils.

=== Ward summary ===
Results of the 2022 West Lothian Council election by ward
| Ward | % | Cllrs | % | Cllrs | % | Cllrs | % | Cllrs | % | Cllrs | % | Cllrs | Total Cllrs |
| Ward | SNP | | Lab | | Green | | Conservative | | Lib Dem | | Others | | Total Cllrs |
|---|---|---|---|---|---|---|---|---|---|---|---|---|---|
| Linlithgow | 26.3 | 1 | 19.5 | 1 | 13.2 | 0 | 19.8 | 0 | 20.3 | 1 | 0.3 | 0 | 3 |
| Broxburn, Uphall and Winchburgh | 41.9 | 2 | 29.6 | 1 | 4.4 | 0 | 17.7 | 1 | 3.7 | 0 | 2.7 | 0 | 4 |
| Livingston North | 48.6 | 2 | 23.8 | 1 | 4.5 | 0 | 20.7 | 1 | 3.9 | 0 | 2.0 | 0 | 4 |
| Livingston South | 39.0 | 2 | 32.4 | 1 | 4.3 | 0 | 11.7 | 1 | 2.2 | 0 | 10.4 | 0 | 4 |
| East Livingston and East Calder | 41.8 | 2 | 21.1 | 1 | 6.6 | 0 | 18.3 | 1 | 3.3 | 0 | 8.9 | 0 | 4 |
| Fauldhouse and the Breich Valley | 38.3 | 1 | 40.2 | 2 | 3.7 | 0 | 14.2 | 0 | 2.33 | 0 | 1.4 | 0 | 3 |
| Whitburn and Blackburn | 38.6 | 2 | 37.4 | 2 | 3.1 | 0 | 18.5 | 0 | 2.4 | 0 | | | 4 |
| Bathgate | 40.4 | 2 | 38.7 | 2 | 3.8 | 0 | 14.1 | 0 | 2.0 | 0 | 0.9 | 0 | 4 |
| Armadale and Blackridge | 22.1 | 1 | 14.1 | 1 | 2.6 | 0 | 10.6 | 0 | 1.0 | 0 | 49.7 | 1 | 3 |
| Total | 37.9 | 15 | 28.6 | 12 | 5.3 | 0 | 15.9 | 4 | 4.8 | 1 | 7.6 | 1 | 33 |

=== Seats changing hands ===
Below is a list of seats which elected a different party or parties from 2017 in order to highlight the change in political composition of the council from the previous election. The list does not include defeated incumbents who resigned or defected from their party and subsequently failed re-election while the party held the seat.

Seats changing hands
| Seat | 2017 | | 2022 | |
| Seat | Party | Member | Party | Member |
|---|---|---|---|---|
| Linlithgow | Conservative | Tom Kerr | Liberal Democrats | Sally Pattle |
| Whitburn and Blackburn | Conservative | Bruce Fairbairn | SNP | Mary Robertson Dickson |
| Bathgate | Conservative | Charles Kennedy | SNP | Pauline Stafford |

== Ward results ==
=== Linlithgow ===
- 2012: 1 x Conservative, 1 x SNP, 1 x Labour
- 2017: 1 x Conservative, 1 x SNP, 1 x Labour
- 2022: 1 x SNP, 1 x Labour, 1 x Liberal Democrat
- 2017-2022 Change: 1 x Liberal Democrat gain from Conservative

Linlithgow - 3 seats
| Party | Candidate | FPv% | Count | | | | |
| Party | Candidate | FPv% | 1 | 2 | 3 | 4 | 5 |
|---|---|---|---|---|---|---|---|
| SNP | Pauline Orr | 26.26% | 1,869 | | | | |
| Liberal Democrats | Sally Pattle | 20.33% | 1,447 | 1,457 | 1,466 | 1,901 | |
| Conservative | Chris Horne | 19.83% | 1,411 | 1,413 | 1,445 | 1,484 | 1,508 |
| Labour | Tom Conn (incumbent) | 19.54% | 1,391 | 1,406 | 1,413 | 1,733 | 1,788 |
| Green | Pamela Barnes | 13.22% | 941 | 988 | 992 | | |
| Scottish Family | Rik Smith | 0.81% | 58 | 59 | | | |
Electorate: 12,435 Valid: 7,117 Spoilt: 53 Quota: 1,780 Turnout: 57.7%

=== Broxburn, Uphall and Winchburgh ===
- 2012: 2 x Labour, 2 x SNP
- 2017: 2 x SNP, 1 x Labour, 1 x Conservative
- 2022: 2 x SNP, 1 x Labour, 1 x Conservative
- 2017-2022 Change: No Change

Broxburn, Uphall and Winchburgh - 4 seats
| Party | Candidate | FPv% | Count | | | | | | | | |
| Party | Candidate | FPv% | 1 | 2 | 3 | 4 | 5 | 6 | 7 | 8 | 9 |
|---|---|---|---|---|---|---|---|---|---|---|---|
| SNP | Diane Calder (incumbent) | 29.04% | 1,990 | | | | | | | | |
| Labour | Ann Davidson | 19.04% | 1,305 | 1,321 | 1,329 | 1,336 | 1,345 | 1,430 | | | |
| Conservative | Angela Doran-Timson (incumbent) | 17.73% | 1,215 | 1,220 | 1,222 | 1,239 | 1,252 | 1,299 | 1,305 | 1,328 | 1,611 |
| SNP | Janet Campbell (incumbent) | 12.84% | 880 | 1,419 | | | | | | | |
| Labour | Hazel McLeod | 10.56% | 724 | 732 | 735 | 745 | 752 | 773 | 819 | 981 | |
| Green | Cam Wright | 4.35% | 298 | 317 | 332 | 345 | 383 | 447 | 449 | | |
| Liberal Democrats | Charles Corser | 3.72% | 255 | 261 | 264 | 275 | 287 | | | | |
| Alba | Phil Noble | 1.39% | 95 | 100 | 103 | 115 | | | | | |
| Scottish Family | Kenneth Sutherland | 1.33% | 91 | 92 | 93 | | | | | | |
Electorate: 16,643 Valid: 6,853 Spoilt: 167 Quota: 1,371 Turnout: 42.2%

=== Livingston North ===
- 2012: 2 x SNP, 2 x Labour
- 2017: 2 x SNP, 1 x Labour, 1 x Conservative
- 2022: 2 x SNP, 1 x Labour, 1 x Conservative
- 2017-2022 Change: No Change

Livingston North - 4 seats
| Party | Candidate | FPv% | Count | | | | | | |
| Party | Candidate | FPv% | 1 | 2 | 3 | 4 | 5 | 6 | 7 |
|---|---|---|---|---|---|---|---|---|---|
| SNP | Robert De Bold (incumbent) | 29.51% | 2,133 | | | | | | |
| SNP | Andrew Miller (incumbent) | 19.09% | 1,380 | 1,945 | | | | | |
| Labour | Anne McMillan | 18.63% | 1,347 | 1,380 | 1,447 | | | | |
| Conservative | Alison Adamson (incumbent) | 17.37% | 1,256 | 1,265 | 1,275 | 1,275 | 1,315 | 1,391 | 1,495 |
| Labour | Michael Rae | 5.12% | 370 | 375 | 399 | 399 | 429 | 538 | |
| Green | Mark Wilkinson | 4.48% | 324 | 351 | 550 | 550 | 572 | 636 | 749 |
| Liberal Democrats | Catrina McDonald | 3.85% | 278 | 288 | 309 | 310 | 329 | | |
| Scottish Family | Robert Bell | 1.95% | 141 | 146 | 158 | 158 | | | |
Electorate: 18,312 Valid: 7,229 Spoilt: 166 Quota: 1,446 Turnout: 40.4%

=== Livingston South ===
- 2012: 2 x Labour, 2 x SNP
- 2017: 2 x SNP, 1 x Labour, 1 x Conservative
- 2021 (by-election): 2 x SNP, 1 x Labour, 1 x Conservative
- 2022: 2 x SNP, 1 x Labour, 1 x Conservative
- 2017-2022 Change: No Change

Livingston South - 4 seats
| Party | Candidate | FPv% | Count | | | | | | | | | |
| Party | Candidate | FPv% | 1 | 2 | 3 | 4 | 5 | 6 | 7 | 8 | 9 | 10 |
|---|---|---|---|---|---|---|---|---|---|---|---|---|
| SNP | Maria Macaulay | 29.76% | 2,252 | | | | | | | | | |
| Labour | Lawrence Fitzpatrick (incumbent) | 26.80% | 2,028 | | | | | | | | | |
| Conservative | Peter Heggie (incumbent) | 11.68% | 884 | 888 | 946 | 954 | 984 | 1,013 | 1,032 | 1,034 | 1,134 | 1,385 |
| SNP | Moira Shemilt (incumbent) | 9.23% | 698 | 1,344 | 1,374 | 1,385 | 1,403 | 1,459 | 1,631 | | | |
| Labour | Craig Smith | 5.58% | 422 | 430 | 736 | 745 | 786 | 841 | 911 | 931 | 1,106 | |
| Independent | Eddie Anderson | 5.08% | 384 | 393 | 422 | 434 | 453 | 601 | 657 | 680 | | |
| Green | Cameron Glasgow | 4.34% | 328 | 360 | 381 | 386 | 424 | 443 | | | | |
| Independent | Eddie Millar | 4.27% | 323 | 333 | 347 | 362 | 373 | | | | | |
| Liberal Democrats | Caron Lindsay | 2.21% | 167 | 171 | 189 | 195 | | | | | | |
| Scottish Family | Margaret Hamilton | 1.06% | 80 | 82 | 87 | | | | | | | |
Electorate: 19,101 Valid: 7,566 Spoilt: 118 Quota: 1,514 Turnout: 40.2%

=== East Livingston and East Calder ===
- 2012: 2 x Labour, 2 x SNP
- 2017: 2 x SNP, 1 x Labour, 1 x Conservative
- 2021 (by-election): 3 x SNP, 1 x Conservative
- 2022: 2 x SNP, 1 x Labour, 1 x Conservative
- 2017-2022 Change: No Change

East Livingston and East Calder - 4 seats
| Party | Candidate | FPv% | Count | | | | | | | |
| Party | Candidate | FPv% | 1 | 2 | 3 | 4 | 5 | 6 | 7 | 8 |
|---|---|---|---|---|---|---|---|---|---|---|
| SNP | Carl John (incumbent) | 26.43% | 1,741 | | | | | | | |
| Conservative | Damian Doran-Timson (incumbent) | 18.29% | 1,205 | 1,213 | 1,239 | 1,279 | 1,288 | 1,310 | 1,317 | 1,377 |
| Labour | Danny Logue | 16.38% | 1,079 | 1,095 | 1,106 | 1,164 | 1,437 | | | |
| SNP | Veronica Smith | 9.44% | 622 | 907 | 915 | 927 | 936 | 946 | 1,287 | 1,499 |
| Independent | Frank Anderson (incumbent) | 7.55% | 497 | 508 | 519 | 539 | 542 | 551 | 583 | |
| Green | Neal Drummond | 6.62% | 436 | 474 | 478 | 534 | 542 | 560 | 585 | 686 |
| SNP | Thomas Ullathorne | 5.92% | 390 | 426 | 426 | 427 | 433 | 435 | | |
| Labour | Andy Rafferty | 4.74% | 312 | 318 | 319 | 330 | | | | |
| Liberal Democrats | Robert Howden | 3.31% | 218 | 224 | 230 | | | | | |
| Scottish Family | Ruth Hutchison | 1.32% | 87 | 88 | | | | | | |
Electorate: 17,970 Valid: 6,587 Spoilt: 121 Quota: 1,318 Turnout: 37.3%

=== Fauldhouse and the Breich Valley ===
- 2012: 2 x Labour, 1 x SNP
- 2017: 2 x Labour, 1 x SNP
- 2022: 2 x Labour, 1 x SNP
- 2017-2022 Change: No Change

Fauldhouse and the Breich Valley - 3 seats
| Party | Candidate | FPv% | Count | | | | | | |
| Party | Candidate | FPv% | 1 | 2 | 3 | 4 | 5 | 6 | 7 |
|---|---|---|---|---|---|---|---|---|---|
| SNP | Pauline Clark (incumbent) | 25.47% | 1,292 | | | | | | |
| Labour | Cathy Muldoon (incumbent) | 21.94% | 1,113 | 1,114 | 1,123 | 1,158 | 1,202 | 1,363 | |
| Labour | Craig Meek | 18.22% | 924 | 925 | 930 | 948 | 975 | 1,219 | 1,295 |
| Conservative | Elaine Fairbairn | 14.16% | 718 | 718 | 720 | 740 | 754 | | |
| SNP | Greg McCarra | 12.85% | 652 | 671 | 693 | 700 | 778 | 801 | 804 |
| Green | Neil Barnes | 3.65% | 185 | 186 | 197 | 216 | | | |
| Liberal Democrats | Gillian Pattle | 2.33% | 118 | 118 | 127 | | | | |
| Alba | Hani Mohamed | 1.38% | 70 | 70 | | | | | |
Electorate: 12,714 Valid: 5,072 Spoilt: 148 Quota: 1,269 Turnout: 41.1%

=== Whitburn and Blackburn ===
- 2012: 2 x Labour, 2 x SNP
- 2017: 2 x Labour, 1 x SNP, 1 x Conservative
- 2022: 2 x Labour, 2 x SNP
- 2017-2022 Change: 1 x SNP gain from Conservative

Whitburn and Blackburn - 4 seats
| Party | Candidate | FPv% | Count | | | | | |
| Party | Candidate | FPv% | 1 | 2 | 3 | 4 | 5 | 6 |
|---|---|---|---|---|---|---|---|---|
| SNP | Jim Dickson (incumbent) | 28.26% | 1,734 | | | | | |
| Labour | George Paul (incumbent) | 20.16% | 1,237 | | | | | |
| Conservative | Bruce Fairbairn (incumbent) | 18.50% | 1,135 | 1,139 | 1,139 | 1,175 | 1,187 | |
| Labour | Kirsteen Sullivan | 17.21% | 1,056 | 1,069 | 1,076 | 1,122 | 1,189 | 1,747 |
| SNP | Mary Robertson Dickson | 10.37% | 636 | 1,085 | 1,085 | 1,095 | 1,196 | 1,230 |
| Liberal Democrats | Derek Pattle | 2.41% | 148 | 152 | 152 | | | |
| Green | Carole Racionzer | 3.10% | 190 | 203 | 204 | 231 | | |
Electorate: 16,945 Valid: 6,136 Spoilt: 204 Quota: 1,228 Turnout: 37.4%

=== Bathgate ===
- 2012: 2 x Labour, 2 x SNP
- 2017: 2xLabour; 1 x SNP; 1 x Conservative
- 2022: 2 x Labour, 2 x SNP
- 2017-2022 Change: 1 x SNP gain from Conservative

Bathgate - 4 seats
| Party | Candidate | FPv% | Count | | | | | | | |
| Party | Candidate | FPv% | 1 | 2 | 3 | 4 | 5 | 6 | 7 | 8 |
|---|---|---|---|---|---|---|---|---|---|---|
| Labour | Harry Cartmill (incumbent) | 33.67% | 2,496 | | | | | | | |
| SNP | William Boyle (incumbent) | 24.36% | 1,806 | | | | | | | |
| SNP | Pauline Stafford | 16.05% | 1,190 | 1,265 | 1,507 | | | | | |
| Conservative | Charles Kennedy (incumbent) | 14.14% | 1,048 | 1,162 | 1,167 | 1,168 | 1,174 | 1,208 | 1,236 | |
| Labour | Tony Pearson | 5.06% | 375 | 1,015 | 1,023 | 1,027 | 1,034 | 1,094 | 1,246 | 1,774 |
| Green | Siobhan Flannigan | 3.79% | 281 | 323 | 351 | 360 | 392 | 425 | | |
| Liberal Democrats | John Mackenzie | 2.02% | 150 | 186 | 191 | 192 | 195 | | | |
| Alba | Gordon Dent | 0.90% | 67 | 74 | 83 | 85 | | | | |
Electorate: 18,082 Valid: 7,413 Spoilt: 138 Quota: 1,483 Turnout: 41.8%

=== Armadale and Blackridge ===
- 2012: 1 x Independent, 1 x Labour, 1 x SNP
- 2017: 1 x Independent, 1 x Labour, 1 x SNP
- 2022: 1 x Independent, 1 x Labour, 1 x SNP
- 2017-2022 Change: No Change

Armadale and Blackridge - 3 seats
| Party | Candidate | FPv% | Count | | | | | |
| Party | Candidate | FPv% | 1 | 2 | 3 | 4 | 5 | 6 |
|---|---|---|---|---|---|---|---|---|
| Independent | Stuart Borrowman (incumbent) | 48.92% | 2,571 | | | | | |
| SNP | Lynda Kenna | 22.05% | 1,159 | 1,407 | | | | |
| Labour | Andrew McGuire (incumbent) | 14.12% | 742 | 1,110 | 1,130 | 1,148 | 1,196 | 1,319 |
| Conservative | Chris Terry | 10.56% | 555 | 789 | 790 | 794 | 820 | 834 |
| Green | Sophie Brodie | 2.59% | 136 | 232 | 264 | 291 | 308 | |
| Liberal Democrats | Helen Mackenzie | 0.95% | 50 | 107 | 110 | 121 | | |
| ISP | John Hannah | 0.82% | 43 | 78 | 91 | | | |
Electorate: 13,162 Valid: 5,256 Spoilt: 58 Quota: 1,315 Turnout: 40.4%

== Aftermath ==
Although the SNP won the most seats, Labour were chosen to run the council after doing a deal with the Conservatives. The council resembles the set up after the previous election, with Labour running a minority administration with loose coalition support from the four Conservative councillors, the Independent Stuart Borrowman and Liberal Democrat, Sally Pattle.

In response to the announcement, former Labour councillor and MSP Neil Findlay, who represented Fauldhouse and the Breich Valley from 2003 to 2012, called his own party "shameful [for] voting Tories into office", saying the Conservatives were "the enemy of my class".

=== 2022 Broxburn, Uphall and Winchburgh by-election ===
In September 2022, Broxburn, Uphall and Winchburgh Labour councillor Ann Davidson died. A by-election was held on 1 December 2022 and was won by Labour candidate Tony Boyle.

Broxburn, Uphall and Winchburgh by-election (1 December 2022) - 1 seat
| Party | Candidate | FPv% | Count | | | | | | | |
| Party | Candidate | FPv% | 1 | 2 | 3 | 4 | 5 | 6 | 7 | 8 |
|---|---|---|---|---|---|---|---|---|---|---|
| Labour | Tony Boyle | 39.8 | 1,783 | 1,790 | 1,809 | 1,839 | 1,912 | 2,016 | 2,191 | 2,778 |
| SNP | Thomas Ullathorne | 35.2 | 1,576 | 1,605 | 1,671 | 1,703 | 1,728 | 1,772 | 1,792 | |
| Conservative | Douglas Smith | 7.8 | 347 | 348 | 349 | 354 | 381 | 458 | | |
| Independent | Chris Horne | 6.1 | 275 | 285 | 292 | 328 | 353 | | | |
| Liberal Democrats | Peter Clarke | 3.7 | 167 | 168 | 183 | 191 | | | | |
| Independent | Steven Laidlaw | 2.8 | 125 | 132 | 136 | | | | | |
| Green | Chris Cotter | 2.7 | 122 | 126 | | | | | | |
| Alba | Debbie Ewen | 1.8 | 29 | | | | | | | |
Electorate: 16,545 Valid: 4,476 Spoilt: 24 Quota: 2,239 Turnout: 27.2%

=== Armadale and Blackridge by-election ===
In May 2024, independent councillor Stuart Borrowman died. A by-election was held on 22 August 2024 to elect his replacement, and was won by Labour candidate Susan Manion.

Armadale and Blackridge by-election (22 August 2024) - 1 seat
| Party | Candidate | FPv% | Count | | | | | | |
| Party | Candidate | FPv% | 1 | 2 | 3 | 4 | 5 | 6 | 7 |
|---|---|---|---|---|---|---|---|---|---|
| Labour | Susan Manion | 28.9 | 795 | 814 | 853 | 890 | 955 | 1,103 | 1,427 |
| SNP | Keith Alan Barclay | 28.3 | 777 | 805 | 820 | 903 | 917 | 967 | |
| Reform | David McLennan | 18.9 | 519 | 519 | 534 | 559 | 637 | | |
| ISP | John Hannah | 8.6 | 236 | 240 | 245 | | | | |
| Conservative | Douglas Smith | 8.2 | 226 | 227 | 248 | 272 | | | |
| Liberal Democrats | Douglas Thomas Butler | 4.4 | 122 | 131 | | | | | |
| Green | Adam William Rafferty | 2.7 | 73 | | | | | | |
Electorate: 13,371 Valid: 2,748 Spoilt: 22 Quota: 1,375 Turnout: 20.7%

=== 2024 Whitburn and Blackburn by-election ===
In September 2024, Labour councillor Kirsteen Sullivan resigned after being elected as the Member of Parliament for the Bathgate and Linlithgow constituency at the 2024 general Election. A by-election was held on 14 November 2024 to elect her replacement, and was won by Labour candidate David Russell.

Whitburn and Blackburn by-election (14 November 2024) - 1 seat
| Party | Candidate | FPv% | Count | | | | | | |
| Party | Candidate | FPv% | 1 | 2 | 3 | 4 | 5 | 6 | 7 |
|---|---|---|---|---|---|---|---|---|---|
| Labour | David Blackie Russell | 30.9 | 1,093 | 1,108 | 1,126 | 1,164 | 1,283 | 1,424 | 1,778 |
| SNP | Aileen Brown | 28.9 | 1,022 | 1,063 | 1,078 | 1,091 | 1,173 | 1,238 | |
| Reform | David McLennan | 16.3 | 578 | 579 | 586 | 653 | 739 | | |
| Independent | Thomas Robert Lynch | 11.9 | 421 | 429 | 452 | 498 | | | |
| Conservative | Charles Kennedy | 6.7 | 239 | 239 | 259 | | | | |
| Liberal Democrats | Douglas Thomas Butler | 2.7 | 97 | 111 | | | | | |
| Green | Cameron Glasgow | 2.6 | 92 | | | | | | |
Electorate: 17,247 Valid: 3,542 Spoilt: 35 Quota: 1,772 Turnout: 20.7%

=== 2025 Broxburn, Uphall and Winchburgh by-election ===
In February 2025, SNP councillor Diane Calder resigned to retire. A by-election was held on 13 March 2025 to elect her replacement, and was won by SNP candidate Mike Carlin.

Broxburn, Uphall and Winchburgh by-election (13 March 2025) - 1 seat
| Party | Candidate | FPv% | Count | | | | | | |
| Party | Candidate | FPv% | 1 | 2 | 3 | 4 | 5 | 6 | 7 |
|---|---|---|---|---|---|---|---|---|---|
| SNP | Mike Carlin | 31.8 | 1,375 | 1,428 | 1,504 | 1,550 | 1,571 | 1,672 | 2,126 |
| Labour | June Andrews | 29.2 | 1,263 | 1,273 | 1,310 | 1,397 | 1,491 | 1,655 | |
| Reform | David McLennan | 18.7 | 809 | 826 | 832 | 851 | 943 | | |
| Conservative | Mamie Taylor | 7.5 | 324 | 326 | 330 | 363 | | | |
| Liberal Democrats | Oliver Thomas Ferrario | 5.3 | 229 | 235 | 274 | | | | |
| Green | Chris Cotter | 4.3 | 185 | 195 | | | | | |
| Alba | Frank Anderson | 3.1 | 135 | | | | | | |
Electorate: 17,404 Valid: 4,320 Spoilt: 37 Quota: 2,161 Turnout: 25.0%

=== 2025 Whitburn and Blackburn by-election ===
On 22 October 2025, Labour councillor David Russell resigned after just over 11 months in the job. A by-election, held on 11 December 2025 was won by Reform UK candidate David McLennan. It became first Reform UK seat to be won in a by-election in Scotland.

Whitburn and Blackburn by-election (11 December 2025) - 1 seat
| Party | Candidate | FPv% | Count | | | | | | | |
| Party | Candidate | FPv% | 1 | 2 | 3 | 4 | 5 | 6 | 7 | 8 |
|---|---|---|---|---|---|---|---|---|---|---|
| Reform | David McLennan | 32.0 | 1,177 | 1,180 | 1,185 | 1,191 | 1,231 | 1,321 | 1,411 | 1,653 |
| SNP | Callum Cox | 28.0 | 1,028 | 1,028 | 1,071 | 1,101 | 1,110 | 1,230 | 1,387 | |
| Labour | Samual McCulloch | 17.1 | 627 | 631 | 636 | 655 | 683 | 762 | | |
| Independent | Thomas Robert Lynch | 13.2 | 484 | 497 | 505 | 530 | 549 | | | |
| Conservative | Reece Sinnott | 3.5 | 129 | 129 | 130 | 142 | | | | |
| Liberal Democrats | Douglas Thomas Butler | 2.8 | 102 | 104 | 121 | | | | | |
| Green | Robbie Gerald Walker | 2.7 | 101 | 102 | | | | | | |
| Independent | Eddie Millar | 0.7 | 27 | | | | | | | |
Electorate: 16,764 Valid: 3,675 Spoilt: 44 Quota: 1,838 Turnout: 22.2%

== Notes ==
1. BRO: Sitting councillor for Broxburn, Uphall and Winchburgh.
2. LAB: On 26 October 2021 Broxburn, Uphall and Winchburgh Labour Cllr Angela Doran-Timson left the Labour Party and joined the Conservatives.
3. SNP: Deselected by the Scottish National Party
