= Livingston North (ward) =

Location of the ward

Livingston North is one of the nine wards used to elect members of the West Lothian Council. It elects four Councillors.

== Councillors ==
Election	Councillors			
2007	Robert de Bold (SNP)	Andrew Miller (SNP)	Bruce Ferrie (Labour)	John Cochrane (Action to Save St John's Hospital)
2012	Robert de Bold (SNP)	Andrew Miller (SNP)	Anne McMillan (Labour)	Angela Moohan (Labour)
2017	Robert de Bold (SNP)	Andrew Miller (SNP)	Dom McGuire (Labour)	Alison Adamson (Conservative)
2022	Robert de Bold (SNP)	Andrew Miller (SNP)	Anne McMillan (Labour)	Alison Adamson (Conservative)

== Election results ==
=== 2017 Election ===
2017 West Lothian Council election

Livingston North - 4 seats
Party	Candidate	FPv%	Count						
Party	Candidate	FPv%	1	2	3	4	5	6	7
Conservative	Alison Adamson	25.45%	1,940						
Labour	Dom McGuire	13.03	993	1,077	1,092	1,209	1,898		
SNP	Robert De Bold (incumbent)	16.31%	1,243	1,254	1,279	1,303	1,327	1,347	2,161
SNP	Andrew Miller (incumbent)	15.35%	1,170	1,175	1,207	1,235	1,260	1,297	1,606
SNP	Lorna Menzies Craig	14.53%	1,107	1,115	1,141	1,163	1,181	1,210	
Labour	Anne McMillan (incumbent)	9.52%	726	764	782	853			
Liberal Democrats	Caron Lindsay	3.28%	250	360	417				
Green	Mark Wilkinson	2.53%	193	213					
Electorate: TBC Valid: 7,622 Spoilt: 123 Quota: 1,525 Turnout: 43.5%

=== 2012 Election ===
2012 West Lothian Council election

Livingston North - 4 seats
Party	Candidate	FPv%	Count							
Party	Candidate	FPv%	1	2	3	4	5	6	7	8
SNP	Robert De Bold (incumbent)	25.30	1,551							
Labour	Anne McMillan	21.95	1,346							
SNP	Andrew Miller (incumbent)	18.14	1,112	1,353.5						
Labour	Angela Moohan	11.27	691	700.2	710.2	813.9	839.3	944.7	1,101.9	1,222.6
Conservative	Alison Adamson	7.81	479	486.9	490.4	493.9	523.6	607.5		
SNP	Annmargaret Watson	7.01	430	457.8	550.9	552	562	642.7	678.9	
Action to Save St John's Hospital	Claire Lynch	6.36	390	405.2	412.9	415.9	453.5			
Liberal Democrats	Caron Marianne Howden	2.15	132	139.1	141.5	143.1				
Electorate: 16,271 Valid: 6,131 Spoilt: 90 Quota: 1,227 Turnout: 6,221 (37.68%)

=== 2007 Election ===
2007 West Lothian Council election

West Lothian Council election, 2007: Livingston North
Party	Candidate	FPv%	%	Seat	Count
SNP	Robert de Bold	1,856	23.6	1	1
Labour	Bruce Ferrie	1,630	20.7	2	1
SNP	Andrew Miller	1,316	16.7	3	5
Labour	Irfan Arif	976	12.4		
Action to Save St John's Hospital	John Cochrane	784	9.9	4	7
Conservative	Alison Adamson-Ross	704	8.9		
Liberal Democrats	Ross McLaren	518	6.6		
Scottish Socialist	Derek Murray	96	1.2		
