= Bathgate (ward) =

Electoral ward of West Lothian Council, Scotland

Location of the ward

Bathgate is one of the nine wards used to elect members of the West Lothian Council. It elects four Councillors.

== Councillors ==
Election	Councillors			
2007	William Boyle (SNP)	James Walker (SNP)	John McGinty (Labour)	3 seats
2012	William Boyle (SNP)	James Walker (SNP)	John McGinty (Labour)	Harry Cartmill (Labour)
2017	William Boyle (SNP)	Charles Kennedy (Conservative)	John McGinty (Labour)	Harry Cartmill (Labour)
2022	William Boyle (SNP)	Pauline Stafford (SNP)	Tony Pearson (Labour)	Harry Cartmill (Labour)

== Election results ==
=== 2022 Election ===
2022 West Lothian Council election

Bathgate – 4 seats
Party	Candidate	FPv%	Count							
Party	Candidate	FPv%	1	2	3	4	5	6	7	8
Labour	Harry Cartmill (incumbent)	33.67%	2,496							
SNP	William Boyle (incumbent)	24.36%	1,806							
SNP	Pauline Stafford	16.05%	1,190	1,265	1,507					
Conservative	Charles Kennedy (incumbent)	14.14%	1,048	1,162	1,167	1,168	1,174	1,208	1,236	
Labour	Tony Pearson	5.06%	375	1,015	1,023	1,027	1,034	1,094	1,246	1,774
Green	Siobhan Flannigan	3.79%	281	323	351	360	392	425		
Liberal Democrats	John Mackenzie	2.02%	150	186	191	192	195			
Alba	Gordon Dent	0.90%	67	74	83	85				
Electorate: 18,082 Valid: 7,413 Spoilt: 138 Quota: 1,483 Turnout: 41.8%

=== 2017 Election ===
2017 West Lothian Council election

Bathgate – 4 seats
Party	Candidate	FPv%	Count						
Party	Candidate	FPv%	1	2	3	4	5	6	7
SNP	William Hannah Boyle (incumbent)	20.20%	1,554						
Labour	Harry Cartmill (incumbent)	21.40%	1,646						
Labour	John McGinty (incumbent)	14.98%	1,152	1,227	1,228	1,257	1,278	1,291	1,597
Conservative	Charles Kennedy	17.93%	1,379	1,388	1,389	1,400	1,409	1,413	1,574
SNP	Barry Burrows	8.49%	653	658	668	675	709	1,031	1,176
Independent	James Walker	9.68%	745	752	752	765	795	806	
SNP	Lisa McArthur	4.50%	346	347	350	355	380		
Green	Dale McDowell	1.56%	120	122	123	143			
Liberal Democrats	Fiona Ann Stevens	1.26%	97	98	98				
Electorate: TBC Valid: 7,692 Spoilt: 174 Quota: 1,539 Turnout: 45.1%

=== 2012 Election ===
2012 West Lothian Council election

Bathgate – 4 seats
Party	Candidate	FPv%	Count						
Party	Candidate	FPv%	1	2	3	4	5	6	7
Labour	John McGinty (incumbent)	22.59	1,314						
SNP	Jim Walker (incumbent)	22.04	1,282						
Labour	Harry Cartmill	19.56	1,138	1,231.1					
SNP	William H. Boyle (incumbent)	18.69	1,087	1,094.8	1,123.8	1,127.9	1,135.2	1,174.7	1,215.1
Independent	Jamie Firth	6.63	453	214.7	218.4	222.3	236.9	293.7	
Conservative	Charles Kennedy	5.93	345	347.5	349.9	352.8	371	405.4	455.9
SNP	Calum Laurie	5.14	299	303.6	347.8	349.7	355.2	371.1	397.4
Action to Save St John's Hospital	Douglas Banks	3.35	195	198.5	201.9	207.8	224.3		
UKIP	Alistair Forrest	1.34	78	79	79.8	80.8			
Electorate: 13,933 Valid: 5,817 Spoilt: 108 Quota: 1,164 Turnout: 5,925 (41.75%)

=== 2007 Election ===
2007 West Lothian Council election

West Lothian Council election, 2007: Bathgate
Party	Candidate	FPv%	%	Seat	Count
Labour	John McGinty	1,521	22.2	2	5
SNP	William Boyle	1,494	21.8	1	5
Labour	Harry Cartmill	1,366	20.0		
SNP	James Walker	1,308	19.1	3	5
Conservative	Donald MacDonald	425	6.2		
Action to Save St John's Hospital	Gary Montgomery	371	5.4		
Liberal Democrats	Charles Corser	265	3.9		
Scottish Socialist	Ally Hendry	93	1.4		
