= 2012 West Lothian Council election =

Scottish local election

- 3 May 2012

All 33 seats to West Lothian Council 17 seats needed for a majority
	First party	Second party
Leader	John McGinty	Peter Johnston
Party	Labour	SNP
Leader's seat	Bathgate	Livingston South
Last election	14 seats, 36.6%	13 seats, 36.3%
Seats before	14	13
Seats won	16	15
Seat change	▲2	▲2
Popular vote	19,909	21,083
Percentage	38.1%	40.4%
Swing	▲1.5%	▲4.1%
	Third party	Fourth party
Leader	Tom Kerr	N/A
Party	Conservative	Independent
Leader's seat	Linlithgow	Armadale and Blackridge
Last election	1 seat, 9.4%	1 seat, 4.6%
Seats before	1	1
Seats won	1	1
Seat change	Steady	Steady
Popular vote	4,591	2,752
Percentage	8.8%	5.3%
Swing	▼0.6%	▲0.7%
- The 9 multi-member wards

- Council composition following the election
Council Leader before election
Peter Johnston
SNP
Council Leader after election
John McGinty
Labour

The 2012 West Lothian Council election took place on 3 May 2012 to elect members of West Lothian Council. The election used the 9 wards created as a result of the Local Governance (Scotland) Act 2004, with each ward electing three or four Councillors using the single transferable vote system form of proportional representation, with 33 Councillors being elected. The Bathgate Ward gained an additional seat for the 2012 elections. The election saw Labour remain the largest party on the Council as they gained 2 seats. The Scottish National Party (SNP) also made 2 net gains and significantly increased their vote share, outpolling Labour in terms of votes cast. The Conservatives retained their single seat on the Council and so to did the Independents. The Action to Save St. John's Hospital group were completely wiped out from the authority losing all of their 3 seats.

Following the election the Labour Party formed a minority administration with the support of the Conservative and Independent Councillors. This replaced the SNP minority administration which had been supported by the Conservative and Action to Save St. John's Hospital group Councillors from 2007-2012.

== Results ==
2012 West Lothian Council election result
Party	Seats	Gains	Losses	Net gain/loss	Seats %	Votes %	Votes	+/−
Labour	16	2	0	▲2	48.5	38.1	19,909	▲1.5
SNP	15	2	0	▲2	45.5	40.4	21,083	▲4.1
Conservative	1	0	0	Steady	3.0	8.8	4,591	▼0.6
Independent	1	0	0	Steady	3.0	5.3	2,752	▲0.7
Action to Save St John's	0	0	3	▼3	0.0	6.7	3,474	▲0.6
Liberal Democrats	0	0	0	Steady	0.0	0.4	200	▼4.7
National Front	0	0		Steady	0.0	0.2	120	New
UKIP	0	0	0	Steady	0.0	0.1	78	New

Note: Bathgate ward is represented by four councillors, rather than three from 2012. "Votes" are the first preference votes. The net gain/loss and percentage changes relate to the result of the previous Scottish local elections on 3 May 2007. This may differ from other published sources showing gain/loss relative to seats held at dissolution of Scotland's councils.

== Ward results ==
=== Linlithgow ===
- 2007: 1xCon; 1xSNP; 1xLab
- 2012: 1xCon; 1xSNP; 1xLab
- 2007-2012 Change: No change

Linlithgow - 3 seats
Party	Candidate	FPv%	Count				
Party	Candidate	FPv%	1	2	3	4	5
Conservative	Tom Kerr (incumbent)	33.18	2,112				
SNP	Martyn Day (incumbent)††	28.70	1,827				
Labour	Tom Conn (incumbent)	20.30	1,292	1,453	1,478.7	1,483.2	1,627.9
SNP	David Tait	13.02	829	920.3	1,101.4	1,106.9	1,186.9
Action to Save St John's	Cherie Finlay	4.40	280	396.7	413.6	423.8	
National Front	Ernest Wilson	0.39	25	30.2	30.6		
Electorate: 11,944 Valid: 6,365 Spoilt: 44 Quota: 1,592 Turnout: 6,409 (53.29%)

=== Broxburn, Uphall and Winchburgh ===
- 2007: 2xLab; 1xSNP; 1xASSH
- 2012: 2xLab; 2xSNP
- 2007-2012 Change: SNP gain one seat from ASSH

Broxburn, Uphall and Winburgh - 4 seats
Party	Candidate	FPv%	Count					
Party	Candidate	FPv%	1	2	3	4	5	6
SNP	Diane Calder	28.21	1,551					
Labour	Tony Boyle	21.11	1,161					
Labour	Alex Davidson	19.79	1,088	1,107.2				
Action to Save St John's	Ellen Glass (incumbent)	13.93	766	791.6	816.1	818.7	996.9	
SNP	Janet Campbell (incumbent)	11.22	617	1,006.4	1,013.2	1,014.1	1,054.3	1,411.2
Conservative	George Thompson	5.75	316	320.7	324.1	324.6		
Electorate: 13,558 Valid: 5,499 Spoilt: 99 Quota: 1,100 Turnout: 5,598 (40.56%)

=== Livingston North ===
- 2007: 2xSNP; 1xLab; 1xASSH
- 2012: 2xSNP; 2xLab
- 2007-2012 Change: Lab gain one seat from ASSH

Livingston North - 4 seats
Party	Candidate	FPv%	Count							
Party	Candidate	FPv%	1	2	3	4	5	6	7	8
SNP	Robert De Bold (incumbent)	25.30	1,551							
Labour	Anne McMillan	21.95	1,346							
SNP	Andrew Miller (incumbent)	18.14	1,112	1,353.5						
Labour	Angela Moohan	11.27	691	700.2	710.2	813.9	839.3	944.7	1,101.9	1,222.6
Conservative	Alison Adamson	7.81	479	486.9	490.4	493.9	523.6	607.5		
SNP	Annmargaret Watson	7.01	430	457.8	550.9	552	562	642.7	678.9	
Action to Save St John's	Claire Lynch	6.36	390	405.2	412.9	415.9	453.5			
Liberal Democrats	Caron Marianne Howden	2.15	132	139.1	141.5	143.1				
Electorate: 16,271 Valid: 6,131 Spoilt: 90 Quota: 1,227 Turnout: 6,221 (37.68%)

=== Livingston South ===
- 2007: 2xLab; 2xSNP
- 2012: 2xLab; 2xSNP
- 2007-2012 Change: No change

Livingston South - 4 seats
Party	Candidate	FPv%	Count					
Party	Candidate	FPv%	1	2	3	4	5	6
Labour	Lawrence Fitzpatrick (incumbent)	34.89	2,395					
SNP	Peter Johnston (incumbent)	24.34	1,671					
Labour	Danny Logue (incumbent)	13.01	893	1,631.7				
SNP	John Muir (incumbent)	11.92	818	867.1	966.2	986	1,015.6	1,534.4
SNP	John Lindsay	5.84	401	444.9	603.8	622.1	648.5	
Conservative	Nick Davis	5.45	374	425.2	428.8	448.9		
Action to Save St John's	Derreck Allen McCullough	4.55	312	376.9	392.4	458.9	679.3	731.3
Electorate: 16,441 Valid: 6,864 Spoilt: 73 Quota: 1,373 Turnout: 6,937 (41.75%)

=== East Livingston and East Calder ===
- 2007: 2xLab; 2xSNP
- 2012: 2xLab; 2xSNP
- 2007-2012 Change: No change

East Livingston and East Calder - 4 seats
Party	Candidate	FPv%	Count				
Party	Candidate	FPv%	1	2	3	4	5
Labour	Dave King (incumbent)	32.14	1,914				
SNP	Frank Anderson (incumbent)	19.26	1,147	1,161.7	1,164.8	1,180.9	1,398.6
SNP	Carl John (incumbent)	16.89	1,006	1,058.4	1,061.2	1,094.1	1,304.3
Labour	Frank Toner	11.45	682	1,237.6			
SNP	Lis Bardell	7.62	454	462.3	464.5	485.9	
Action to Save St John's	Jean Ann Finch	6.38	380	407.9	419.3	607.3	637.3
Conservative	Evelyn Stirling	6.25	372	386.7	389.9		
Electorate: 14,346 Valid: 5,955 Spoilt: 92 Quota: 1,192 Turnout: 6,047 (41.51%)

=== Fauldhouse and the Breich Valley ===
- 2007: 2xLab; 1xSNP
- 2012: 2xLab; 1xSNP
- 2007-2012 Change: No change

Fauldhouse and the Breich Valley - 3 seats
Party	Candidate	FPv%	Count					
Party	Candidate	FPv%	1	2	3	4	5	6
Labour	David Dodds	33.30	1,713					
SNP	Garry Knox	17.57	904	929.6	949.1	1,023.6	1,039.2	
Labour	Cathy Muldoon (incumbent)	17.53	902	1,235.7	1,264.5	1,423.6		
SNP	Greg McCarra (incumbent)	17.42	896	905.7	931.2	1,063.7	1,085.5	1,999.8
Action to Save St John's	Jim Warnock	10.34	532	557.4	647.6			
Conservative	Alastair Lowrie	3.83	197	202.5				
Electorate: 11,239 Valid: 5,144 Spoilt: 106 Quota: 1,287 Turnout: 5,250 (45.77%)

=== Whitburn and Blackburn ===
- 2007: 2xLab; 1xSNP; 1xASSH
- 2012: 2xLab; 2xSNP
- 2007-2012 Change: SNP gain one seat from ASSH

Whitburn and Blackburn - 4 seats
Party	Candidate	FPv%	Count							
Party	Candidate	FPv%	1	2	3	4	5	6	7	8
Labour	George Paul (incumbent)	32.59	1,896							
SNP	Jim Dickson (incumbent)	27.68	1,610							
Labour	Barry Robertson	11.96	696	1,356.2						
Action to Save St John's	George Beurskens (incumbent)	10.64	619	639.8	668.9	712.4	729.7	760.3	886.4	
SNP	Mary Dickson	9.66	562	575.1	964	986.7	996.9	1,012.3	1,058.5	1,317.4
Conservative	Stuart Martin	4.66	271	273.3	277.5	287.6	312.2	337.1		
National Front	Neil McIvor	1.63	95	98.5	100.7	104.5	108.6			
Liberal Democrats	Robert Durie Howden	1.17	68	72.2	75.8	83.7				
Electorate: 11,239 Valid: 5,817 Spoilt: 108 Quota: 1,164 Turnout: 5,925 (41.75%)

=== Bathgate ===
- 2007: 2xSNP; 1xLab
- 2012: 2xLab; 2xSNP
- 2007-2012 Change: No change Lab gain extra seat

Bathgate - 4 seats
Party	Candidate	FPv%	Count						
Party	Candidate	FPv%	1	2	3	4	5	6	7
Labour	John McGinty (incumbent)	22.59	1,314						
SNP	Jim Walker (incumbent)	22.04	1,282						
Labour	Harry Cartmill	19.56	1,138	1,231.1					
SNP	William H. Boyle (incumbent)	18.69	1,087	1,094.8	1,123.8	1,127.9	1,135.2	1,174.7	1,215.1
Independent	Jamie Firth	6.63	453	214.7	218.4	222.3	236.9	293.7	
Conservative	Charles Kennedy	5.93	345	347.5	349.9	352.8	371	405.4	455.9
SNP	Calum Laurie	5.14	299	303.6	347.8	349.7	355.2	371.1	397.4
Action to Save St John's	Douglas Banks	3.35	195	198.5	201.9	207.8	224.3		
UKIP	Alistair Forrest	1.34	78	79	79.8	80.8			
Electorate: 13,933 Valid: 5,817 Spoilt: 108 Quota: 1,164 Turnout: 5,925 (41.75%)

=== Armadale and Blackridge ===
- 2007: 1xIndependent; 1xLab; 1xSNP
- 2012: 1xIndependent; 1xSNP; 1xLab
- 2007-2012 Change: No change

Armadale and Blackridge - 3 seats
Party	Candidate	FPv%	Count	
Party	Candidate	FPv%	1	2
Independent	Stuart Borrowman (incumbent)	56.68	2,541	
SNP	Isabel Hutton (incumbent)†	19.21	861	1,217.5
Labour	Jim Dixon (incumbent)	17.58	788	1,283.1
SNP	Dean Williamson	3.75	168	229.5
Conservative	Marion Kerr	2.79	125	246.8
Electorate: 11,247 Valid: 4,483 Spoilt: 49 Quota: 1,121 Turnout: 4,532 (39.86%)

== Aftermath ==
=== Armadale and Blackridge by-election ===
Armadale and Blackridge SNP Cllr Isabel Hutton was disqualified for non-attendance on 16 February 2015. The by-election was held on 26 March 2015 and the seat was won by the SNP's Sarah King.

Armadale and Blackridge by-election (26 March 2015) - 1 Seat
Party	Candidate	FPv%	Count			
Party	Candidate	FPv%	1	2	3	4
SNP	Sarah King	43.4%	1,620	1,647	1,676	1,874
Labour	Andrew McGuire	27.0%	1,009	1,018	1,074	1,382
Independent	Scott Mackay	20.3%	756	786	868	
Conservative	Ian Burgess	6.8%	255	264		
Green	Jenny Johnson	2.4%	90			
Electorate: 12,315 Valid: 3,730 Spoilt: 46 Quota: 1,866 Turnout: 3,776 (30.7%)

=== Linlithgow by-election ===
Linlithgow SNP Cllr Martyn Day was elected MP for Linlithgow and East Falkirk on 7 May 2015. He resigned his Council seat in July 2015 and a by-election was held on 1 October 2015 and the seat was held by the party's David Tait

Linlithgow by-election (1 October 2015) - 1 seat
Party	Candidate	FPv%	Count				
Party	Candidate	FPv%	1	2	3	4	5
SNP	David Tait	43.1%	2,049	2,061	2,099	2,234	2,325
Labour	David Manion	22.9%	1,088	1,131	1,175	1,279	1,644
Conservative	Ian Burgess	20.5%	973	992	1,056	1,070	
Green	Maire McCormack	5.9%	282	303	346		
Independent	Brenda Galloway	4.8%	230	246			
Liberal Democrats	Caron Lindsay	2.8%	133				
Electorate: 12,516 Valid: 4,755 Spoilt: 28 Quota: 2,378 Turnout: 4,783 (38.2%)
