= East Livingston and East Calder (ward) =

Electoral ward in West Lothian, Scotland

Location of the ward

East Livingston and East Calder is one of the nine wards used to elect members of the West Lothian Council. It elects four Councillors.

== Councillors ==
Election	Councillors			
2007	Frank Anderson (SNP)	Carl John (SNP)	Willie Dunn (Labour)	Dave King (Labour)
2012	Frank Anderson (SNP)	Carl John (SNP)	Frank Toner (Labour)	Dave King (Labour)
2017	Frank Anderson (SNP)	Carl John (SNP)	Damian Timson (Conservative)	Dave King (Labour)
2021	Frank Anderson (SNP)	Carl John (SNP)	Damian Timson (Conservative)	Thomas George Ullathorne (SNP)
2022	Veronica Smith (SNP)	Carl John (SNP)	Damian Timson (Conservative)	Danny Logue (Labour)

== Upcoming Elections ==
=== 2021 By-Election ===
Following the death of Labour Councillor and Depute Provost Dave King a by-election was called and is due to take place on August 5, 2021.

East Livingston and East Calder - 1 seat
Neal Drummond	Scottish Green Party
Hans Edgington	Scottish Liberal Democrats
John Hannah	Independence for Scotland Party
Danny Logue	Scottish Labour Party
David Philip	Scottish Conservative and Unionist Party
Thomas George Ullathorne	Scottish National Party (SNP)

== Election results ==
=== 2022 Election ===
2022 West Lothian Council election

East Livingston and East Calder - 4 seats
Party	Candidate	FPv%	Count							
Party	Candidate	FPv%	1	2	3	4	5	6	7	8
SNP	Carl John (incumbent)	26.43%	1,741							
Conservative	Damian Doran-Timson (incumbent)	18.29%	1,205	1,213	1,239	1,279	1,288	1,310	1,317	1,377
Labour	Danny Logue	16.38%	1,079	1,095	1,106	1,164	1,437			
SNP	Veronica Smith	9.44%	622	907	915	927	936	946	1,287	1,499
Independent	Frank Anderson (incumbent)	7.55%	497	508	519	539	542	551	583	
Green	Neal Drummond	6.62%	436	474	478	534	542	560	585	686
SNP	Thomas Ullathorne	5.92%	390	426	426	427	433	435		
Labour	Andy Rafferty	4.74%	312	318	319	330				
Liberal Democrats	Robert Howden	3.31%	218	224	230					
Scottish Family	Ruth Hutchison	1.32%	87	88						
Electorate: 17,970 Valid: 6,587 Spoilt: 121 Quota: 1,318 Turnout: 37.3%

=== 2017 Election ===
2017 West Lothian Council election

East Livingston and East Calder - 4 seats
Party	Candidate	FPv%	Count						
Party	Candidate	FPv%	1	2	3	4	5	6	7
Labour	Dave King (incumbent)	23.75%	1,749						
Conservative	Damian Timson	22.00%	1,620						
SNP	Frank Anderson (incumbent)	20.09%	1,479						
SNP	Carl John (incumbent)	13.20%	972	994	998	1,002	1,014	1,105	1,648
Labour	Scott Rogers	7.13%	525	724	765	766	829	918	941
SNP	Veronica Smith	7.54%	555	561	564	565	578	652	
Green	Neal Drummond	3.60%	265	274	284	285	366		
Liberal Democrats	Charles Corser	2.69%	198	208	239	239			
Electorate: TBC Valid: 7,363 Spoilt: 141 Quota: 1,473 Turnout: 45.9%

=== 2012 Election ===
2012 West Lothian Council election

East Livingston and East Calder - 4 seats
Party	Candidate	FPv%	Count				
Party	Candidate	FPv%	1	2	3	4	5
Labour	Dave King (incumbent)	32.14	1,914				
SNP	Frank Anderson (incumbent)	19.26	1,147	1,161.7	1,164.8	1,180.9	1,398.6
SNP	Carl John (incumbent)	16.89	1,006	1,058.4	1,061.2	1,094.1	1,304.3
Labour	Frank Toner	11.45	682	1,237.6			
SNP	Lis Bardell	7.62	454	462.3	464.5	485.9	
Action to Save St John's Hospital	Jean Ann Finch	6.38	380	407.9	419.3	607.3	637.3
Conservative	Evelyn Stirling	6.25	372	386.7	389.9		
Electorate: 14,346 Valid: 5,955 Spoilt: 92 Quota: 1,192 Turnout: 6,047 (41.51%)

=== 2007 Election ===
2007 West Lothian Council election

West Lothian Council election, 2007: East Livingston and East Calder
Party	Candidate	FPv%	%	Seat	Count
SNP	Frank Anderson	1,918	24.6	1	1
Labour	Willie Dunn	1,733	22.3	2	1
Labour	Dave King	1,569	20.2	3	1
SNP	Carl John	795	10.2	4	7
Action to Save St John's Hospital	Lorraine Robertson	625	8.0		
Conservative	Andy Murray	591	7.6		
Liberal Democrats	James Chapman	421	5.4		
Scottish Socialist	Helen Donnelly	133	1.7		
