= Livingston South (ward) =

Electoral jurisdiction in Scotland

Location of the ward

Livingston South is one of the nine wards used to elect members of the West Lothian Council. It elects four Councillors. In April 2020, Peter Johnson retired from West Lothian Council triggering a by-election on the 11th March 2021 where Maria MacAulay (SNP) was duly elected.

== Councillors ==
Election	Councillors			
2007	Peter Johnson (SNP)	John Muir (SNP)	Danny Logue (Labour)	Lawrence Fitzpatrick (Labour)
2012	Peter Johnson (SNP)	John Muir (SNP)	Danny Logue (Labour)	Lawrence Fitzpatrick (Labour)
2017	Peter Johnson (SNP)	Moira Shemilt (SNP)	Peter Heggie (Conservative)	Lawrence Fitzpatrick (Labour)
2022	Maria Macaulay (SNP)	Moira Shemilt (SNP)	Peter Heggie (Conservative)	Lawrence Fitzpatrick (Labour)

== Election results ==
=== 2022 Election ===
2022 West Lothian Council election

Livingston South - 4 seats
Party	Candidate	FPv%	Count									
Party	Candidate	FPv%	1	2	3	4	5	6	7	8	9	10
SNP	Maria Macaulay	29.76%	2,252									
Labour	Lawrence Fitzpatrick (incumbent)	26.80%	2,028									
Conservative	Peter Heggie (incumbent)	11.68%	884	888	946	954	984	1,013	1,032	1,034	1,134	1,385
SNP	Moira Shemilt (incumbent)	9.23%	698	1,344	1,374	1,385	1,403	1,459	1,631			
Labour	Craig Smith	5.58%	422	430	736	745	786	841	911	931	1,106	
Independent	Eddie Anderson	5.08%	384	393	422	434	453	601	657	680		
Green	Cameron Glasgow	4.34%	328	360	381	386	424	443				
Independent	Eddie Millar	4.27%	323	333	347	362	373					
Liberal Democrats	Caron Lindsay	2.21%	167	171	189	195						
Scottish Family	Margaret Hamilton	1.06%	80	82	87							
Electorate: 19,101 Valid: 7,566 Spoilt: 118 Quota: 1,514 Turnout: 40.2%

=== 2017 Election ===
2017 West Lothian Council election

Livingston South - 4 seats
Party	Candidate	FPv%	Count						
Party	Candidate	FPv%	1	2	3	4	5	6	7
Labour	Lawrence Fitzpatrick (incumbent)	27.12%	2,228						
SNP	Peter Johnston (incumbent)	20.69%	1,700						
Conservative	Peter Heggie	19.40%	1,594	1,673					
SNP	Moira Shemilt	13.02%	1,070	1,109	1,151	1,151	1,169	1,268	1,827
Labour	Danny Logue (incumbent)	8.41%	691	1,080	1,083	1,091	1,137	1,216	1,241
SNP	Annmargaret Watson	7.17%	589	593	598	599	602	620	
Green	Jayne Glass	2.44%	200	221	223	225	275		
Liberal Democrats	Jill Pattle	1.75%	144	154	155	160			
Electorate: TBC Valid: 8,216 Spoilt: 140 Quota: 1,644 Turnout: 46.3%

=== 2012 Election ===
2012 West Lothian Council election

Livingston South - 4 seats
Party	Candidate	FPv%	Count					
Party	Candidate	FPv%	1	2	3	4	5	6
Labour	Lawrence Fitzpatrick (incumbent)	34.89	2,395					
SNP	Peter Johnston (incumbent)	24.34	1,671					
Labour	Danny Logue (incumbent)	13.01	893	1,631.7				
SNP	John Muir (incumbent)	11.92	818	867.1	966.2	986	1,015.6	1,534.4
SNP	John Lindsay	5.84	401	444.9	603.8	622.1	648.5	
Conservative	Nick Davis	5.45	374	425.2	428.8	448.9		
Action to Save St John's Hospital	Derreck Allen McCullough	4.55	312	376.9	392.4	458.9	679.3	731.3
Electorate: 16,441 Valid: 6,864 Spoilt: 73 Quota: 1,373 Turnout: 6,937 (41.75%)

=== 2007 Election ===
2007 West Lothian Council election

West Lothian Council election, 2007: Livingston South
Party	Candidate	FPv%	%	Seat	Count
Labour	Lawrence Fitzpatrick	2,584	30.4	1	1
SNP	Peter Johnson	2,543	30.0	2	1
Labour	Danny Logue	1,081	12.7	3	3
SNP	John Muir	879	10.4	4	5
Conservative	Marion Kerr	527	6.2		
Liberal Democrats	Evan Bell	420	4.9		
Independent	Eddie Anderson	341	4.0		
Scottish Socialist	Mary Kerr	115	1.4		
