= Kirsteen Sullivan =

British politician

Kirsteen Sullivan MP
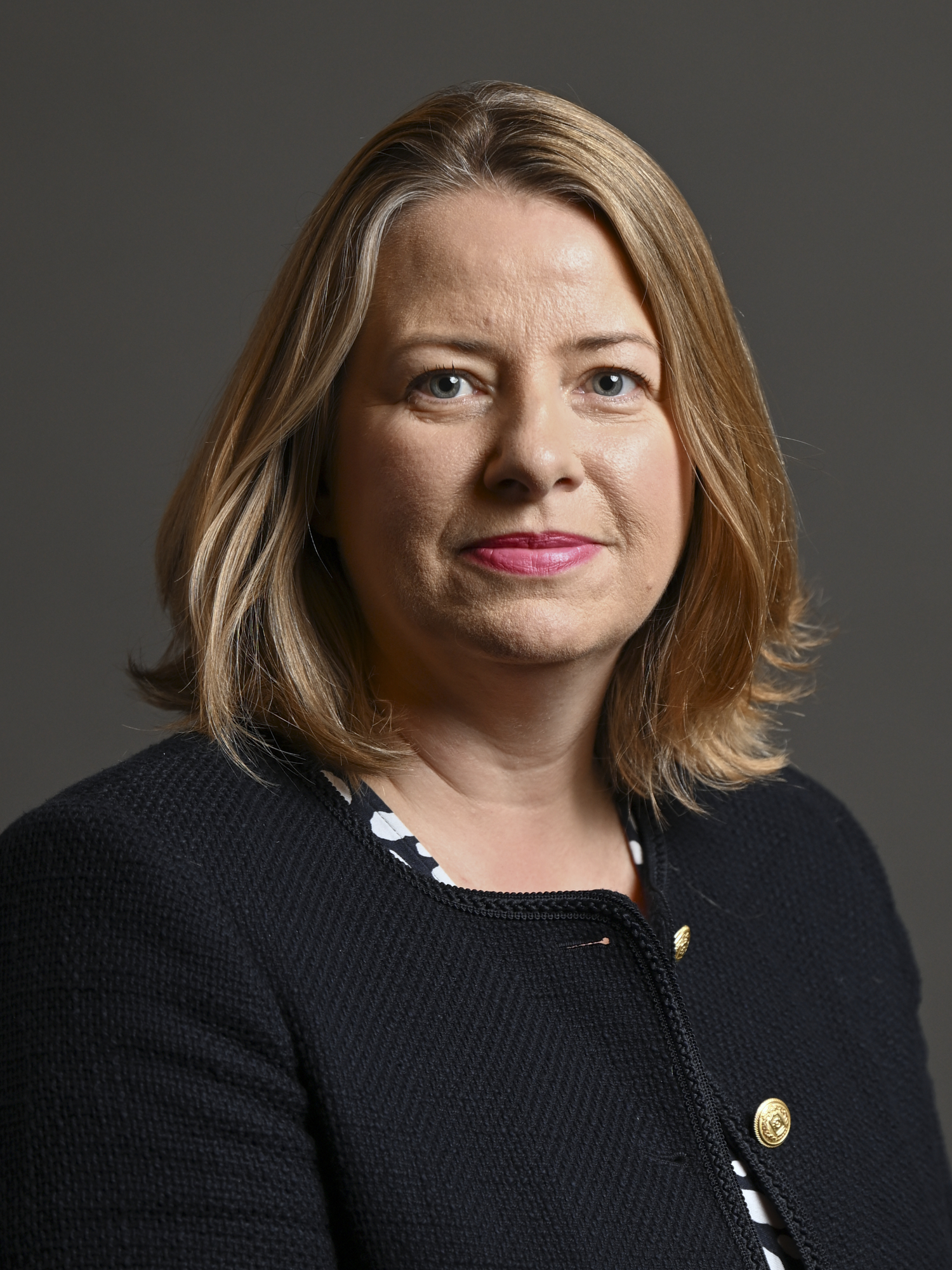
- Official portrait, 2024

Member of Parliament for Bathgate and Linlithgow
- Incumbent
- Assumed office 4 July 2024
- Preceded by: Constituency established
- Majority: 8,323 (19.8%)

Personal details
- Born: Kirsteen Ann Sullivan; July 1975 (age 51) Glasgow, Scotland
- Party: Labour Co-op
- Children: 3
- Education: St Ninian's High School; Glasgow University (MA); University of Strathclyde (MSc)
- Occupation: Politician; business analyst

Kirsteen Ann Sullivan is a Scottish politician who has been the Member of Parliament for Bathgate and Linlithgow since 2024. A member of the Scottish Labour and Co-operative Party, she gained the seat from Martyn Day, a member of the Scottish National Party.

== Education ==
Sullivan studied at Glasgow University and Strathclyde Business School.

== Career ==
Sullivan has worked as a business analyst for several private companies, including Scottish Widows. Prior to becoming an MP, Sullivan served as a councillor for Whitburn and Blackburn on West Lothian Council. Sullivan served as Labour depute leader of West Lothian Council from 2017 to 2024.

=== Parliamentary career ===
On 4 July 2024, she was elected as MP for Bathgate and Linlithgow. She received 19,774 votes (47%) in the general election in a new constituency formed as a result of the 2023 Periodic Review of Westminster constituencies. On 26 July 2024, she made her maiden speech in the House of Commons during a debate on "Making Britain a Clean Energy Superpower".

== Personal life ==
Sullivan lives in Bathgate and is originally from Glasgow which is where she was born. She has three children. As of 2024 she owns a second home in Spain.

Parliament of the United Kingdom
New constituency	Member of Parliament for Bathgate and Linlithgow; 2024–present	Incumbent
