= Linlithgow (ward) =

Electoral ward in West Lothian, Scotland

Location of the ward

Linlithgow is one of the nine wards used to elect members of the West Lothian Council. It elects four Councillors. In 2019, the population of the ward was 16,499.

== Councillors ==
Election	Councillors		
2007	Martyn Day (SNP)	Tom Conn (Labour)	Tom Kerr (Conservative)
2012	Martyn Day (SNP)	Tom Conn (Labour)	Tom Kerr (Conservative)
2017	David Tait (SNP)	Tom Conn (Labour)	Tom Kerr (Conservative)
2022	Pauline Orr (SNP)	Tom Conn (Labour)	Sally Pattle (Liberal Democrats)

== Election results ==
=== 2022 Election ===
2022 West Lothian Council election

Linlithgow - 3 seats
Party	Candidate	FPv%	Count				
Party	Candidate	FPv%	1	2	3	4	5
SNP	Pauline Orr	26.26%	1,869				
Liberal Democrats	Sally Pattle	20.33%	1,447	1,457	1,466	1,901	
Conservative	Chris Horne	19.83%	1,411	1,413	1,445	1,484	1,508
Labour	Tom Conn (incumbent)	19.54%	1,391	1,406	1,413	1,733	1,788
Green	Pamela Barnes	13.22%	941	988	992		
Scottish Family	Rik Smith	0.81%	58	59			
Electorate: 12,435 Valid: 7,117 Spoilt: 53 Quota: 1,780 Turnout: 57.7%

=== 2017 Election ===
2017 West Lothian Council election

Linlithgow - 3 seats
Party	Candidate	FPv%	Count						
Party	Candidate	FPv%	1	2	3	4	5	6	7
Conservative	Tom Kerr (incumbent)	41.92%	3,037						
Labour	Tom Conn (incumbent)	14.63%	1,060	1,425	1,450	1,558	1,956		
SNP	David Tait (incumbent)	16.01%	1,160	1,215	1,217	1,310	1,390	1,405	2,529
SNP	Sue Friel	15.06%	1,091	1,126	1,129	1,246	1,319	1,341	
Liberal Democrats	Sally Pattle	5.26%	381	692	714	872			
Green	Maire McCormack	6.57%	476	535	541				
UKIP	Alan Cooper	0.55%	40	113					
Electorate: TBC Valid: 7,245 Spoilt: 74 Quota: 1,812 Turnout: 59.0%

=== 2012 Election ===
2012 West Lothian Council election

Linlithgow - 3 seats
Party	Candidate	FPv%	Count				
Party	Candidate	FPv%	1	2	3	4	5
Conservative	Tom Kerr (incumbent)	33.18	2,112				
SNP	Martyn Day (incumbent)††	28.70	1,827				
Labour	Tom Conn (incumbent)	20.30	1,292	1,453	1,478.7	1,483.2	1,627.9
SNP	David Tait	13.02	829	920.3	1,101.4	1,106.9	1,186.9
Action to Save St John's Hospital	Cherie Finlay	4.40	280	396.7	413.6	423.8	
National Front	Ernest Wilson	0.39	25	30.2	30.6		
Electorate: 11,944 Valid: 6,365 Spoilt: 44 Quota: 1,592 Turnout: 6,409 (53.29%)

=== 2007 Election ===
2007 West Lothian Council election

West Lothian Council election, 2007: Linlithgow
Party	Candidate	FPv%	%	Seat	Count
Conservative	Tom Kerr	2,120	26.9	1	1
SNP	Martyn Day	1,792	22.7	2	6
SNP	Tam Smith	1,340	17.0		
Labour	Tom Conn	1,328	16.9	3	6
Liberal Democrats	Geoff King	739	9.4		
Green	Simon King-Spooner	316	4.0		
Conservative	Sandy Pagan	194	2.4		
Scottish Socialist	Eddy Cornock	49	2.5		
