= 1995 West Lothian Council election =

1995 Scottish local government election

- 6 April 1995

All 27 seats to West Lothian Council 14 seats needed for a majority
	First party	Second party	Third party
Party	Labour	SNP	Conservative
Last election	10 seats, 38.5%	11 seats, 43.0%	2 seats, 12.2%
Seats won	15	11	1
Seat change	▲5	Steady	▼1
Popular vote	24,445	23,230	2,168
Percentage	46.9%	44.6%	4.2%
Swing	▲8.4%	▲1.6%	▼8.0%
- Map of ward results

- Council composition following the election

Elections to West Lothian Council were held on 6 April 1995, on the same day as the other Scottish local government elections. This was the first election to the unitary council following the implementation of the Local Government etc. (Scotland) Act 1994.

The election used the 27 wards created by the Formation Electoral Arrangements in 1994. Each ward elected one councillor using first-past-the-post voting.

== Results ==
1995 West Lothian Council election result
Party	Seats	Gains	Losses	Net gain/loss	Seats %	Votes %	Votes	+/−
Labour	15			▲5	55.6	46.9	24,445	▲8.4
SNP	11			Steady	40.7	44.6	23,230	▲1.6
Conservative	1			▼1	3.7	4.2	2,168	▼8.0
Independent	0			▼1	0.0	2.4	1,236	▼1.7
Liberal Democrats	0			Steady	0.0	2.0	1,022	▼0.4
