= Pauline Stafford (politician) =

Scottish politician and musician

Pauline Stafford MSP
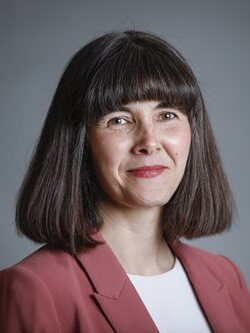
- Official Portrait, 2026

Member of the Scottish Parliament for Bathgate
- Incumbent
- Assumed office 7 May 2026
- Preceded by: Constituency established
- Majority: 5,587 (16.7%)

Personal details
- Party: Scottish National Party

Pauline Stafford is a Scottish politician and classical pianist who has served as the Member of the Scottish Parliament (MSP) for Bathgate since 2026, representing the Scottish National Party (SNP).

== Career ==
=== Music ===
Stafford is a professional classical pianist who has worked with the National Youth Choir of Scotland (NYCOS). NYCOS is Scotland's national youth singing organisation, providing opportunities for young people from age 0 to 25 across its national and regional choirs, and operating a West Lothian regional choir among fourteen choirs across the country.

=== West Lothian Council ===
Stafford was elected as a SNP councillor for Bathgate Ward (Ward 8) on West Lothian Council at the 2022 Scottish local elections. The ward covers the town of Bathgate and returned four councillors using the single transferable vote system. She subsequently served as Depute Leader of the SNP opposition group on the council. During her time on the council she campaigned against closures of nurseries, community centres and swimming pools in the area, and against restrictions to the West Lothian Scottish Welfare Payment by the Labour and Conservative-run administration.

== Personal life ==
Stafford lives in Bathgate, West Lothian, where she was born and raised. She has spoken of her pride in West Lothian's musical tradition, citing the Boghall and Bathgate Pipe Band, Whitburn Brass Band and singer Lewis Capaldi among the area's musical connections.

== Political career ==
=== SNP candidate selection ===
In April 2025, Stafford was confirmed as the SNP candidate for the newly created Bathgate constituency. She also topped the SNP's regional list for the new Central Scotland and Lothians West region, ahead of Neil Gray, the party's Health Secretary.

=== 2026 Scottish Parliament election ===
At the 2026 Scottish Parliament election on 7 May 2026, Stafford was elected as the first MSP for the Bathgate constituency, defeating Labour's Jenny Young into second place. The full result was:

Candidate	Party	Votes	%
Pauline Stafford	Scottish National Party	13,594	40.8
Jenny Young	Scottish Labour Party	8,007	24.0
David McLennan	Reform UK	7,511	22.5
Peter Heggie	Scottish Conservative and Unionist Party	2,091	6.3
Stephen Harte	Scottish Liberal Democrats	1,937	5.8
Gus Ferguson	British Unionist Party	227	0.7
SNP majority		5,587	16.7
Total valid votes		33,367	
Turnout		49.1%	

On declaring her victory, Stafford said the result was a win for "hope over hate". The Bathgate constituency was created from the former Linlithgow seat as part of the Second Periodic Review of Scottish Parliament Boundaries, with the remainder of the old Linlithgow area joining part of former Falkirk East to form the new Falkirk East and Linlithgow constituency. Its predecessor constituency Linlithgow had been held by Fiona Hyslop for the SNP since 2011, who did not stand again at the 2026 election.

== External list ==
- Scottish Parliament profiles of MSPs: Pauline Stafford

Scottish Parliament
Preceded by Constituency established	Member of the Scottish Parliament for Bathgate; 2026–present	Incumbent
