= Whitburn and Blackburn (ward) =

Electoral ward in West Lothian, Scotland

Location of the ward

Whitburn and Blackburn is one of the nine wards used to elect members of the West Lothian Council. It elects four Councillors.

== Councillors ==
Election	Councillors			
2007	James Dickson (SNP)	Jim Swan (Labour)	George Paul (Labour)	Gordon Beurskens (Action to save St. John's Hospital)
2012	James Dickson (SNP)	Barry Robertson (Labour)	George Paul (Labour)	Mary Dickson (SNP)
2017	James Dickson (SNP)	Kirsteen Sullivan (Labour)	George Paul (Labour)	Bruce Fairbairn (Conservative)
2022	James Dickson (SNP)	Kirsteen Sullivan (Labour)	George Paul (Labour)	Mary Dickson (SNP)
2024 by	James Dickson (SNP)	David Russell (Labour)	George Paul (Labour)	Mary Dickson (SNP)
2025 by	James Dickson (SNP)	David McLennan (Reform UK)	George Paul (Labour)	Mary Dickson (SNP)

== Election results ==
=== 2025 by-election ===
Whitburn and Blackburn By-Election 11 December 2025
Party	Candidate	FPv%	Count							
Party	Candidate	FPv%	1	2	3	4	5	6	7	8
Reform	David McLennan	32.0	1,177	1,180	1,185	1,191	1,231	1,321	1,411	1,653
SNP	Callum Cox	28.0	1,028	1,028	1,071	1,101	1,110	1,230	1,387	
Labour	Samual McCulloch	17.1	627	631	636	655	683	762		
Independent	Thomas Robert Lynch	13.2	484	497	505	530	549			
Conservative	Reece Sinnott	3.5	129	129	130	142				
Liberal Democrats	Douglas Thomas Butler	2.8	102	104	121					
Green	Robbie Gerald Walker	2.7	101	102						
Independent	Eddie Millar	0.7	27							
Reform gain from Labour										
Valid: 3,675 Spoilt: 44 Quota: 1,838 Turnout: 3,719

=== 2024 by-election ===
Whitburn and Blackburn By-Election 14 November 2024
Party	Candidate	FPv%	Count						
Party	Candidate	FPv%	1	2	3	4	5	6	7
Labour	David Russell	30.9	1,093	1,108	1,126	1,164	1,283	1,424	1,778
SNP	Aileen Brown	28.9	1,022	1,063	1,078	1,091	1,173	1,238	
Reform	David McLennan	16.3	578	579	586	653	739		
Independent	Thomas Robert Lynch	11.9	421	429	452	498			
Conservative	Charles Kennedy	6.7	239	239	259				
Liberal Democrats	Douglas Thomas Butler	2.7	97	111					
Green	Cameron Glasgow	2.6	92						
Labour hold									
Valid: 3,542 Spoilt: 35 Quota: 1,772 Turnout: 3,577

=== 2022 Election ===
2022 West Lothian Council election

Whitburn and Blackburn - 4 seats
Party	Candidate	FPv%	Count					
Party	Candidate	FPv%	1	2	3	4	5	6
SNP	Jim Dickson (incumbent)	28.26%	1,734					
Labour	George Paul (incumbent)	20.16%	1,237					
Labour	Kirsteen Sullivan	17.21%	1,056	1,069	1,076	1,122	1,189	1,747
Conservative	Bruce Fairbairn (incumbent)	18.50%	1,135	1,139	1,139	1,175	1,187	
SNP	Mary Robertson Dickson	10.37%	636	1,085	1,085	1,095	1,196	1,230
Liberal Democrats	Derek Pattle	2.41%	148	152	152			
Green	Carole Racionzer	3.10%	190	203	204	231		
Electorate: 16,945 Valid: 6,136 Spoilt: 204 Quota: 1,228 Turnout: 37.4%

=== 2017 Election ===
2017 West Lothian Council election

Whitburn and Blackburn - 4 seats
Party	Candidate	FPv%	Count						
Party	Candidate	FPv%	1	2	3	4	5	6	7
Labour	George Paul (incumbent)	28.08%	1,822						
SNP	Jim Dickson (incumbent)	24.44%	1,586						
Conservative	Bruce Fairbairn	21.99%	1,427						
Labour	Kirsteen Sullivan	8.59%	557	1,015	1,020	1,054	1,149	1,209	1,486
SNP	Mary Dickson (incumbent)	7.75%	503	519	742	744	766	1,129	
SNP	John Leslie	6.47%	420	426	468	470	481		
Liberal Democrats	Bob Howden	2.68%	174	182	186	224			
Electorate: TBC Valid: 6,489 Spoilt: 175 Quota: 1,298 Turnout: 42.6%

=== 2012 Election ===
2012 West Lothian Council election

Whitburn and Blackburn - 4 seats
Party	Candidate	FPv%	Count							
Party	Candidate	FPv%	1	2	3	4	5	6	7	8
Labour	George Paul (incumbent)	32.59	1,896							
SNP	Jim Dickson (incumbent)	27.68	1,610							
Labour	Barry Robertson	11.96	696	1,356.2						
Action to Save St John's Hospital	Gordon Beurskens (incumbent)	10.64	619	639.8	668.9	712.4	729.7	760.3	886.4	
SNP	Mary Dickson	9.66	562	575.1	964	986.7	996.9	1,012.3	1,058.5	1,317.4
Conservative	Stuart Martin	4.66	271	273.3	277.5	287.6	312.2	337.1		
National Front	Neil McIvor	1.63	95	98.5	100.7	104.5	108.6			
Liberal Democrats	Robert Durie Howden	1.17	68	72.2	75.8	83.7				
Electorate: 11,239 Valid: 5,817 Spoilt: 108 Quota: 1,164 Turnout: 5,925 (41.75%)

=== 2007 Election ===
2007 West Lothian Council election

West Lothian Council election, 2007: Whitburn and Blackburn
Party	Candidate	FPv%	%	Seat	Count
SNP	James Dickson	1,981	27.1	1	1
Labour	Jim Swan	1,528	20.9	2	1
Labour	George Paul	1,367	18.7	3	5
Action to Save St John's Hospital	Gordon Beurskens	851	11.7	4	8
SNP	Mary Dickson	507	6.9		
Conservative	Alistair Lowrie	435	6.0		
Independent	Tony Fairley	309	4.2		
Liberal Democrats	Bob Howden	222	3.0		
Scottish Socialist	Mark Eccles	98	1.3		
