= Martyn Day (politician) =

Scottish SNP politician

Martyn Day MSP
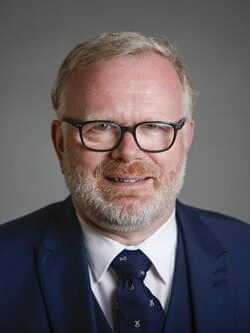
- Official portrait, 2026

SNP Spokesperson for Health in the House of Commons
- In office 14 December 2021 – 4 September 2023
- Leader: Ian Blackford; Stephen Flynn
- Preceded by: Philippa Whitford
- Succeeded by: Amy Callaghan

Member of Parliament for Linlithgow and East Falkirk
- In office 7 May 2015 – 30 May 2024
- Preceded by: Michael Connarty
- Succeeded by: Constituency abolished

Member of the Scottish Parliament for Falkirk East and Linlithgow
- Incumbent
- Assumed office 7 May 2026
- Preceded by: Constituency established
- Majority: 5,435 (14.5%)

Personal details
- Born: 26 March 1971 (age 55) Falkirk, Scotland
- Party: Scottish National Party
- Website: www.martynday.scot

Martyn Day (born 26 March 1971) is a Scottish National Party (SNP) politician, who has served as a Member of the Scottish Parliament for Falkirk East and Linlithgow since May 2026. He was previously the Member of Parliament (MP) for Linlithgow and East Falkirk from 2015 until 2024. He served as SNP Spokesperson for Health from December 2021 to September 2023.

== Early life and education ==
Born in Falkirk, Martyn Day was brought up in Linlithgow and attended Linlithgow Academy. Prior to his political career, he worked for the Bank of Scotland as a personal banking manager.

== Political career ==
He was first elected to West Lothian Council at the 1999 Scottish local elections representing the Linlithgow ward. From 2007–12 the SNP led the administration of West Lothian Council and Day held the portfolio of Development and Transport on the Council Executive, and served on over 40 committees and outside bodies. After the 2012 Scottish local elections, the SNP found themselves in opposition in West Lothian and Day took on the post of spokesperson for Development and Transport and group whip.

Day was selected to contest the Linlithgow and East Falkirk constituency at the 2015 general election, when he defeated the sitting Labour MP, Michael Connarty. He received 32,055 votes and a 52.0% share of the vote. He retained his seat at the 2017 snap election, but with a greatly reduced majority of 2,919 votes.

At the 2019 general election, Day was re-elected again, with an increased majority of 11,266 votes, with Charles Kennedy of the Conservatives finishing in second place.

At the 2024 general election, Day contested the seat of Bathgate and Linlithgow. He was defeated by Kirsteen Sullivan of Scottish Labour, losing by a majority of 8,323, and finished in second place.

In the 2026 Scottish Parliament election, he was elected to represent Falkirk East and Linlithgow.

== Post-parliamentary career ==
Following his defeat at the 2024 UK General Election, Day has found employment as a videographer at SPVR Filming and a caseworker for Gordon MacDonald MSP. He is also Co-convener of the Scottish Independence Convention.

Parliament of the United Kingdom
Preceded by Michael Connarty	Member of Parliament for Linlithgow and East Falkirk; 2015–2024	Constituency abolished
