= Broxburn, Uphall and Winchburgh (ward) =

Electoral ward in West Lothian, Scotland

Location of the ward

Broxburn, Uphall and Winchburgh is one of the nine wards used to elect members of the West Lothian Council. It elects four Councillors.

== Councillors ==
Election	Councillors			
2007	Janet Campbell (SNP)	Graeme Morrice (Labour)	Alex Davidson (Labour)	Ellen Glass (Action to Save St John's Hospital)
2012	Janet Campbell (SNP)	Tony Boyle (Labour)	Alex Davidson (Labour)	Diane Calder (SNP)
2017	Janet Campbell (SNP)	Chris Horne (Conservative)	Angela Doran (Labour)	Diane Calder (SNP)
2022	Janet Campbell (SNP)	Ann Davidson (Labour)	Angela Doran (Labour)	Diane Calder (SNP)
Dec 2022	Janet Campbell (SNP)	Tony Boyle (Labour)	Angela Doran (Labour)	Diane Calder (SNP)
2025	Janet Campbell (SNP)	Tony Boyle (Labour)	Angela Doran (Labour)	Mike Carlin (SNP)

== Election results ==
=== December 2022 by-election ===
Following the death of Scottish Labour councillor, Ann Davidson, a by-election was triggered and was held on 1 December 2022, where Tony Boyle won for Scottish Labour.

Broxburn, Uphall and Winchburgh - 4 seats
Party	Candidate	FPv%	Count							
Party	Candidate	FPv%	1	2	3	4	5	6	7	8
Labour	Tony Boyle	39.08%	1,783	1,790	1,809	1,839	1,912	2,016	2,191	2,778
SNP	Thomas Ullathorne	35.02%	1,576	1,605	1,671	1,703	1,728	1,772	1,792	
Conservative	Douglas Smith	7.08%	347	348	349	354	381	458		
Independent	Chris Horne	6.01%	275	285	292	328	358			
Liberal Democrats	Peter Clarke	3.07%	167	168	183	191				
Independent	Steven Laidlaw	2.08%	298	305	136					
Green	Chris Cotter	2.07%	122	126						
Alba	Debbie Ewen	1.80%	81							
Electorate: 16,545 Valid: 4,500 Spoilt: 24 Quota: 2,239 Turnout: 27.2%

=== 2022 Election ===
2022 West Lothian Council election

Broxburn, Uphall and Winchburgh - 4 seats
Party	Candidate	FPv%	Count								
Party	Candidate	FPv%	1	2	3	4	5	6	7	8	9
SNP	Diane Calder (incumbent)	29.04%	1,990								
Labour	Ann Davidson	19.04%	1,305	1,321	1,329	1,336	1,345	1,430			
Conservative	Angela Doran-Timson (incumbent)	17.73%	1,215	1,220	1,222	1,239	1,252	1,299	1,305	1,328	1,611
SNP	Janet Campbell (incumbent)	12.84%	880	1,419							
Labour	Hazel McLeod	10.56%	724	732	735	745	752	773	819	981	
Green	Cam Wright	4.35%	298	317	332	345	383	447	449		
Liberal Democrats	Charles Corser	3.72%	255	261	264	275	287				
Alba	Phil Noble	1.39%	95	100	103	115					
Scottish Family	Kenneth Sutherland	1.33%	91	92	93						
Electorate: 16,643 Valid: 6,853 Spoilt: 167 Quota: 1,371 Turnout: 42.2%

=== 2017 Election ===
2017 West Lothian Council election

Broxburn, Uphall and Winchburgh - 4 seats
Party	Candidate	FPv%	Count								
Party	Candidate	FPv%	1	2	3	4	5	6	7	8	9
SNP	Diane Calder (incumbent)	27.24%	1,898								
Conservative	Chris Horne	27.23%	1,897								
Labour	Angela Doran	19.00%	1,324	1,340	1,448						
SNP	Janet Campbell (incumbent)	8.37%	583	868	880	882	894	961	990	1,057	1,666
SNP	Pippa Plevin	6.06%	422	571	577	577	580	626	668	739	
Labour	Audrey Middleton	4.49%	313	318	368	410	423	467	628		
Liberal Democrats	John Woods	3.12%	217	224	350	352	368	454			
Green	June Douglas	3.67%	256	274	297	299	313				
TUSC	Elaine Mallon	0.82%	57	59	72	74					
Electorate: TBC Valid: 6,967 Spoilt: 165 Quota: 1,394 Turnout: 46.2%

=== 2012 Election ===
2012 West Lothian Council election

Broxburn, Uphall and Winchburgh - 4 seats
Party	Candidate	FPv%	Count					
Party	Candidate	FPv%	1	2	3	4	5	6
SNP	Diane Calder	28.21	1,551					
Labour	Tony Boyle	21.11	1,161					
Labour	Alex Davidson	19.79	1,088	1,107.2				
Action to Save St John's Hospital	Ellen Glass (incumbent)	13.93	766	791.6	816.1	818.7	996.9	
SNP	Janet Campbell (incumbent)	11.22	617	1,006.4	1,013.2	1,014.1	1,054.3	1,411.2
Conservative	George Thompson	5.75	316	320.7	324.1	324.6		
Electorate: 13,558 Valid: 5,499 Spoilt: 99 Quota: 1,100 Turnout: 5,598 (40.56%)

=== 2007 Election ===
2007 West Lothian Council election

West Lothian Council election, 2007: Broxburgh, Uphall and Winchburgh
Party	Candidate	FPv%	%	Seat	Count
Labour	Alexander Davidson	1,668	22.6	1	1
SNP	Janet Campbell	1,562	21.1	2	1
Labour	Graeme Morrice	1,139	15.4	4	5
Action to Save St John's Hospital	Ellen Glass	1,047	14.2	3	5
SNP	Eddie Malcolm	987	13.3		
Conservative	Jack Thompson	559	7.6		
Liberal Democrats	Patricia Chapman	431	5.8		
