= 2007 West Lothian Council election =

2007 Scottish local government election

- 3 May 2007

All 32 seats to West Lothian Council 17 seats needed for a majority
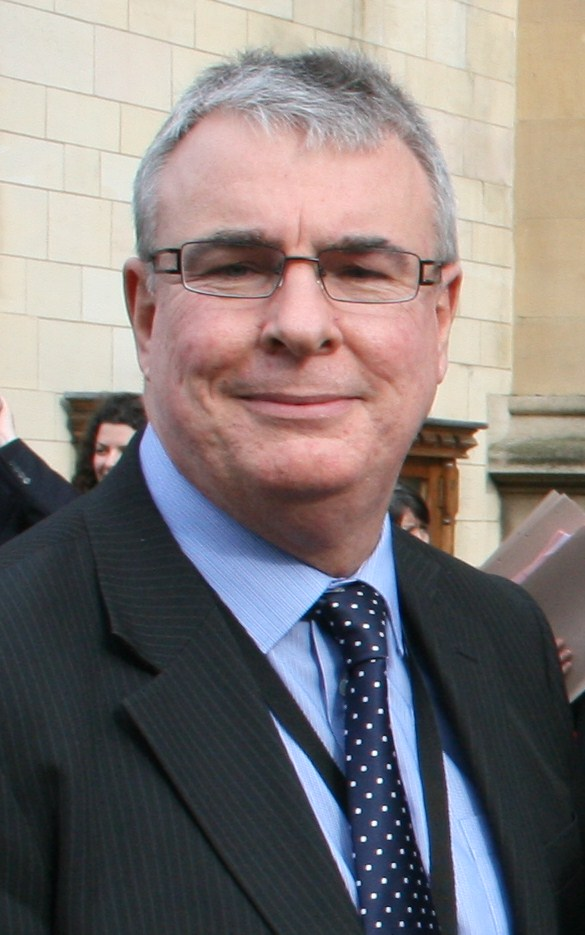
| | First party | Second party | Third party |
|---|---|---|---|
| | | SNP | ASSJH |
| Leader | Graeme Morrice | Peter Johnston | Gordon Beurskens |
| Party | Labour | SNP | Action to Save St John's |
| Leader's seat | Broxburn, Uphall and Winchburgh | Livingston South | Whitburn and Blackburn |
| Last election | 18 seats, 43.5% | 12 seats, 36.3% | Did not contest |
| Seats won | 14 | 13 | 3 |
| Seat change | ▼4 | ▲1 | ▲3 |
| Popular vote | 23,833 | 23,620 | 3,997 |
| Percentage | 36.6% | 36.3% | 6.1% |
| Swing | ▼6.9% | Steady | New |
| | Fourth party | Fifth party |
| | Con | Ind |
| Leader | Tom Kerr (Note: Only Conservative elected) | N/A |
| Party | Conservative | Independent |
| Leader's seat | Linlithgow | Armadale and Blackridge |
| Last election | 1 seat, 9.2% | 1 seat, 2.5% |
| Seats won | 1 | 1 |
| Seat change | Steady | ▲1 |
| Popular vote | 6,142 | 3,018 |
| Percentage | 9.4% | 4.6% |
| Swing | ▲0.2% | ▲2.1% |
- The 9 new multi-member wards

- Council composition following the election
Council Leader before election
Grame Morrice
Labour
Council Leader after election
Pete Johnston
SNP

Elections to West Lothian Council were held on 3 May 2007, the same day as the other Scottish local government elections and the Scottish Parliament general election. The election was the first to use nine new wards created as a result of the Local Governance (Scotland) Act 2004, each ward elects three or four councillors using the single transferable vote system, a form of proportional representation. The new wards replace 32 single-member wards which used the plurality (first past the post) system of election.

== Results ==
2007 West Lothian Council election result
| Party | Seats | Gains | Losses | Net gain/loss | Seats % | Votes % | Votes | +/− |
|---|---|---|---|---|---|---|---|---|
| Labour | 14 | - | - | ▼4 | 43.8 | 36.6 | 23,833 | ▼6.9 |
| SNP | 13 | - | - | ▲1 | 40.6 | 36.3 | 23,620 | Steady |
| Action to Save St John's | 3 | - | - | ▲3 | 9.4 | 6.1 | 3,997 | New |
| Conservative | 1 | - | - | Steady | 3.1 | 9.4 | 6,142 | ▲0.2 |
| Independent | 1 | - | - | Steady | 3.1 | 4.6 | 3,018 | ▲2.1 |
| Liberal Democrats | 0 | - | - | Steady | 0.0 | 5.1 | 3,337 | ▼1.9 |
| Scottish Socialist | 0 | - | - | Steady | 0.0 | 1.2 | 778 | ▼0.2 |
| Green | 0 | - | - | Steady | 0.0 | 0.5 | 316 | New |

== Ward results ==
2007 West Lothian Council election: Linlithgow
| Party | Candidate | FPv% | % | Seat | Count |
|---|---|---|---|---|---|
| Conservative | Tom Kerr | 2,120 | 26.9 | 1 | 1 |
| SNP | Martyn Day | 1,792 | 22.7 | 2 | 6 |
| SNP | Tam Smith | 1,340 | 17.0 | | |
| Labour | Tom Conn | 1,328 | 16.9 | 3 | 6 |
| Liberal Democrats | Geoff King | 739 | 9.4 | | |
| Green | Simon King-Spooner | 316 | 4.0 | | |
| Conservative | Sandy Pagan | 194 | 2.4 | | |
| Scottish Socialist | Eddy Cornock | 49 | 2.5 | | |

2007 West Lothian Council election: Broxburn, Uphall and Winchburgh
| Party | Candidate | FPv% | % | Seat | Count |
|---|---|---|---|---|---|
| Labour | Alexander Davidson | 1,668 | 22.6 | 1 | 1 |
| SNP | Janet Campbell | 1,562 | 21.1 | 2 | 1 |
| Labour | Graeme Morrice | 1,139 | 15.4 | 4 | 5 |
| Action to Save St. John's Hospital | Ellen Glass | 1,047 | 14.2 | 3 | 5 |
| SNP | Eddie Malcolm | 987 | 13.3 | | |
| Conservative | Jack Thompson | 559 | 7.6 | | |
| Liberal Democrats | Patricia Chapman | 431 | 5.8 | | |

2007 West Lothian Council election: Livingston North
| Party | Candidate | FPv% | % | Seat | Count |
|---|---|---|---|---|---|
| SNP | Robert de Bold | 1,856 | 23.6 | 1 | 1 |
| Labour | Bruce Ferrie | 1,630 | 20.7 | 2 | 1 |
| SNP | Andrew Miller | 1,316 | 16.7 | 3 | 5 |
| Labour | Irfan Arif | 976 | 12.4 | | |
| Action to Save St John's Hospital | John Cochrane | 784 | 9.9 | 4 | 7 |
| Conservative | Alison Adamson-Ross | 704 | 8.9 | | |
| Liberal Democrats | Ross McLaren | 518 | 6.6 | | |
| Scottish Socialist | Derek Murray | 96 | 1.2 | | |

2007 West Lothian Council election: Livingston South
| Party | Candidate | FPv% | % | Seat | Count |
|---|---|---|---|---|---|
| Labour | Lawrence Fitzpatrick | 2,584 | 30.4 | 1 | 1 |
| SNP | Peter Johnson | 2,543 | 30.0 | 2 | 1 |
| Labour | Danny Logue | 1,081 | 12.7 | 3 | 3 |
| SNP | John Muir | 879 | 10.4 | 4 | 5 |
| Conservative | Marion Kerr | 527 | 6.2 | | |
| Liberal Democrats | Evan Bell | 420 | 4.9 | | |
| Independent | Eddie Anderson | 341 | 4.0 | | |
| Scottish Socialist | Mary Kerr | 115 | 1.4 | | |

2007 West Lothian Council election: East Livingston and East Calder
| Party | Candidate | FPv% | % | Seat | Count |
|---|---|---|---|---|---|
| SNP | Frank Anderson | 1,918 | 24.6 | 1 | 1 |
| Labour | Willie Dunn | 1,733 | 22.3 | 2 | 1 |
| Labour | Dave King | 1,569 | 20.2 | 3 | 1 |
| SNP | Carl John | 795 | 10.2 | 4 | 7 |
| Action to Save St John's Hospital | Lorraine Robertson | 625 | 8.0 | | |
| Conservative | Andy Murray | 591 | 7.6 | | |
| Liberal Democrats | James Chapman | 421 | 5.4 | | |
| Scottish Socialist | Helen Donnelly | 133 | 1.7 | | |

2007 West Lothian Council election: Fauldhouse and the Breich Valley
| Party | Candidate | FPv% | % | Seat | Count |
|---|---|---|---|---|---|
| Labour | Neil Findlay | 2,137 | 33.8 | 1 | 1 |
| SNP | Greg McCarra | 1,669 | 26.4 | 2 | 1 |
| Labour | Cathy Muldoon | 1,340 | 21.1 | 3 | 4 |
| Conservative | Sheila Grierson | 335 | 5.3 | | |
| Action to Save St John's Hospital | Tom Orr | 319 | 5.0 | | |
| Independent | James Ford | 203 | 3.2 | | |
| Liberal Democrats | Graham Wenham | 184 | 2.9 | | |
| Scottish Socialist | Alun Birrell | 139 | 2.2 | | |

2007 West Lothian Council election: Whitburn and Blackburn
| Party | Candidate | FPv% | % | Seat | Count |
|---|---|---|---|---|---|
| SNP | James Dickson | 1,981 | 27.1 | 1 | 1 |
| Labour | Jim Swan | 1,528 | 20.9 | 2 | 1 |
| Labour | George Paul | 1,367 | 18.7 | 3 | 5 |
| Action to Save St John's Hospital | Gordon Beurskens | 851 | 11.7 | 4 | 8 |
| SNP | Mary Dickson | 507 | 6.9 | | |
| Conservative | Alistair Lowrie | 435 | 6.0 | | |
| Independent | Tony Fairley | 309 | 4.2 | | |
| Liberal Democrats | Bob Howden | 222 | 3.0 | | |
| Scottish Socialist | Mark Eccles | 98 | 1.3 | | |

2007 West Lothian Council election: Bathgate
| Party | Candidate | FPv% | % | Seat | Count |
|---|---|---|---|---|---|
| Labour | John McGinty | 1,521 | 22.2 | 2 | 5 |
| SNP | William Boyle | 1,494 | 21.8 | 1 | 5 |
| Labour | Harry Cartmill | 1,366 | 20.0 | | |
| SNP | James Walker | 1,308 | 19.1 | 3 | 5 |
| Conservative | Donald MacDonald | 425 | 6.2 | | |
| Action to Save St John's Hospital | Gary Montgomery | 371 | 5.4 | | |
| Liberal Democrats | Charles Corser | 265 | 3.9 | | |
| Scottish Socialist | Ally Hendry | 93 | 1.4 | | |

2007 West Lothian Council election: Armadale and Blackridge
| Party | Candidate | FPv% | % | Seat | Count |
|---|---|---|---|---|---|
| Independent | Stuart Borrowman | 1,385 | 24.7 | 1 | 3 |
| Labour | Jim Dixon | 1,330 | 23.7 | 2 | 5 |
| SNP | Isabel Hutton | 1,156 | 20.6 | 3 | 7 |
| Independent | Duncan MacLean | 780 | 13.9 | | |
| SNP | Grant McLennan | 517 | 9.2 | | |
| Conservative | Lindsay Butchart | 252 | 4.5 | | |
| Liberal Democrats | Caron Howden | 137 | 2.4 | | |
| Scottish Socialist | Steve Nimmo | 55 | 1.0 | | |
