= Armadale and Blackridge (ward) =

Electoral ward in West Lothian, Scotland

Location of the ward

Armadale and Blackridge is one of nine wards used to elect members of the West Lothian Council. It elects three Councillors.

== Councillors ==
Election	Councillors		
2007	Isabel Hutton (SNP)	Stuart Borrowman (Independent)	Jim Dixon (Labour)
2012	Isabel Hutton (SNP)	Stuart Borrowman (Independent)	Jim Dixon (Labour)
2017	Sarah King (SNP)	Stuart Borrowman (Independent)	Andrew McGuire (Labour)
2022	Lynda Kenna (SNP)	Stuart Borrowman (Independent)	Andrew McGuire (Labour)
2024 by	Lynda Kenna (SNP)	Susan Manion (Labour)	Andrew McGuire (Labour)

== Election results ==
=== 2024 by-election ===
In May 2024, independent councillor Stuart Borrowman died. A by-election was held on 22 August 2024 to elect his replacement, and was won by Labour candidate Susan Manion.

Armadale and Blackridge by-election (22 August 2024) - 1 seat
Party	Candidate	FPv%	Count						
Party	Candidate	FPv%	1	2	3	4	5	6	7
Labour	Susan Manion	28.9	795	814	853	890	955	1,103	1,427
SNP	Keith Alan Barclay	28.3	777	805	820	903	917	967	
Reform	David McLennan	18.9	519	519	534	559	637		
ISP	John Hannah	8.6	236	240	245				
Conservative	Douglas Smith	8.2	226	227	248	272			
Liberal Democrats	Douglas Thomas Butler	4.4	122	131					
Green	Adam William Rafferty	2.7	73						
Electorate: 13,371 Valid: 2,748 Spoilt: 22 Quota: 1,375 Turnout: 20.7%

=== 2022 election ===
2022 West Lothian Council election

Armadale and Blackridge - 3 seats
Party	Candidate	FPv%	Count					
Party	Candidate	FPv%	1	2	3	4	5	6
Independent	Stuart Borrowman (incumbent)	48.92%	2,571					
SNP	Lynda Kenna	22.05%	1,159	1,407				
Labour	Andrew McGuire (incumbent)	14.12%	742	1,110	1,130	1,148	1,196	1,319
Conservative	Chris Terry	10.56%	555	789	790	794	820	834
Green	Sophie Brodie	2.59%	136	232	264	291	308	
Liberal Democrats	Helen Mackenzie	0.95%	50	107	110	121		
ISP	John Hannah	0.82%	43	78	91			
Electorate: 13,162 Valid: 5,256 Spoilt: 58 Quota: 1,315 Turnout: 40.4%

=== 2017 election ===
2017 West Lothian Council election

Armadale and Blackridge - 3 seats
Party	Candidate	FPv%	Count					
Party	Candidate	FPv%	1	2	3	4	5	6
Independent	Stuart Borrowman (incumbent)	45.02%	2,343					
SNP	Sarah King (incumbent)	25.41%	1,322					
Labour	Andrew McGuire	13.59%	707	1,012	1,016	1,056	1,131	1,589
Conservative	Ian Burgess	13.89%	723	1,016	1,017	1,035	1,057	
Green	Paula Stokes	1.19%	62	149	157	189		
Liberal Democrats	Chris Smillie	0.90%	47	117	118			
Electorate: TBC Valid: 5,204 Spoilt: 56 Quota: 1,302 Turnout: 42.20%

=== 2012 election ===
2012 West Lothian Council election

Armadale and Blackridge - 3 seats
Party	Candidate	FPv%	Count	
Party	Candidate	FPv%	1	2
Independent	Stuart Borrowman (incumbent)	56.68	2,541	
SNP	Isabel Hutton (incumbent)†	19.21	861	1,217.5
Labour	Jim Dixon (incumbent)	17.58	788	1,283.1
SNP	Dean Williamson	3.75	168	229.5
Conservative	Marion Kerr	2.79	125	246.8
Electorate: 11,247 Valid: 4,483 Spoilt: 49 Quota: 1,121 Turnout: 4,532 (39.86%)

=== 2007 election ===
2007 West Lothian Council election

2007 West Lothian Council election: Armadale and Blackridge
Party	Candidate	FPv%	%	Seat	Count
Independent	Stuart Borrowman	1,385	24.7	1	3
Labour	Jim Dixon	1,330	23.7	2	5
SNP	Isabel Hutton	1,156	20.6	3	7
Independent	Duncan MacLean	780	13.9		
SNP	Grant McLennan	517	9.2		
Conservative	Lindsay Butchart	252	4.5		
Liberal Democrats	Caron Howden	137	2.4		
Scottish Socialist	Steve Nimmo	55	1.0		
