= 2017 West Lothian Council election =

2017 Scottish local government election

- 4 May 2017

All 33 seats to West Lothian Council 17 seats needed for a majority
	First party	Second party
Leader	Peter Johnston	John McGinty
Party	SNP	Labour
Leader's seat	Livingston South	Bathgate
Last election	15 seats, 40.4%	16 seats, 38.1%
Seats before	15	16
Seats won	13	12
Seat change	▼2	▼4
Popular vote	23,218	18,082
Percentage	37.3%	29.0%
Swing	▼3.1%	▼9.1%
	Third party	Fourth party
Leader	Damian Timson	Stuart Borrowman
Party	Conservative	Independent
Leader's seat	East Calder and East Livingston	Armadale and Blackridge
Last election	1 seat, 3.1%	1 seat, 5.3%
Seats before	1	1
Seats won	7	1
Seat change	▲6	Steady
Popular vote	14,449	3,088
Percentage	23.2%	5.0%
Swing	▲14.3%	▼0.3%

Council Leader before election
John McGinty
Labour
Council Leader after election
Lawrence Fitzpatrick
Labour

The 2017 West Lothian Council election took place on 4 May 2017. The election used the 9 wards created as a result of the Local Governance (Scotland) Act 2004, with each ward electing three or four Councillors using the single transferable vote system form of proportional representation, with 33 Councillors being elected. The election resulted in no overall party majority, leading to the Labour Party and the Conservative Party forming a coalition administration.

== Results ==
2017 West Lothian local election result
Party	Seats	Gains	Losses	Net gain/loss	Seats %	Votes %	Votes	+/−
SNP	13	0	2	▼2	39.4	37.3	23,218	▼3.1
Labour	12	0	4	▼4	36.4	29.0	18,082	▼9.1
Conservative	7	6	0	▲6	21.2	23.2	14,449	▲14.3
Independent	1	0	0	Steady	3.0	5.0	3,088	▼0.3
Green	0	0	0	Steady	0.0	2.7	1,695	New
Liberal Democrats	0	0	0	Steady	0.0	2.6	1,632	▲2.2
TUSC	0	0	0	Steady	0.0	0.1	57	New
UKIP	0	0	0	Steady	0.0	0.1	40	▼0.1

Note: "Votes" are the first preference votes. The net gain/loss and percentage changes relate to the result of the previous Scottish local elections in 2012. This may differ from other published sources showing gain/loss relative to seats held at dissolution of Scotland's councils.

== Ward results ==
=== Linlithgow ===
- 2012: 1 x Conservative, 1 x SNP, 1 x Labour
- 2017: 1 x Conservative, 1 x SNP, 1 x Labour
- 2012-2017 Change: No Change

Linlithgow - 3 seats
Party	Candidate	FPv%	Count						
Party	Candidate	FPv%	1	2	3	4	5	6	7
Conservative	Tom Kerr (incumbent)	41.92%	3,037						
Labour	Tom Conn (incumbent)	14.63%	1,060	1,425	1,450	1,558	1,956		
SNP	David Tait (incumbent)	16.01%	1,160	1,215	1,217	1,310	1,390	1,405	2,529
SNP	Sue Friel	15.06%	1,091	1,126	1,129	1,246	1,319	1,341	
Liberal Democrats	Sally Pattle	5.26%	381	692	714	872			
Green	Maire McCormack	6.57%	476	535	541				
UKIP	Alan Cooper	0.55%	40	113					
Electorate: TBC Valid: 7,245 Spoilt: 74 Quota: 1,812 Turnout: 59.0%

=== Broxburn, Uphall and Winchburgh ===
- 2012: 2 x Labour, 2 x SNP
- 2017: 2 x SNP, 1 x Labour, 1 x Conservative
- 2012-2017 Change: 1 x Conservative gain from Labour

Broxburn, Uphall and Winchburgh - 4 seats
Party	Candidate	FPv%	Count								
Party	Candidate	FPv%	1	2	3	4	5	6	7	8	9
SNP	Diane Calder (incumbent)	27.24%	1,898								
Conservative	Chris Horne	27.23%	1,897								
Labour	Angela Doran†††	19.00%	1,324	1,340	1,448						
SNP	Janet Campbell (incumbent)	8.37%	583	868	880	882	894	961	990	1,057	1,666
SNP	Pippa Plevin	6.06%	422	571	577	577	580	626	668	739	
Labour	Audrey Middleton	4.49%	313	318	368	410	423	467	628		
Liberal Democrats	John Woods	3.12%	217	224	350	352	368	454			
Green	June Douglas	3.67%	256	274	297	299	313				
TUSC	Elaine Mallon	0.82%	57	59	72	74					
Electorate: TBC Valid: 6,967 Spoilt: 165 Quota: 1,394 Turnout: 46.2%

=== Livingston North ===
- 2012: 2 x SNP, 2 x Labour
- 2017: 2 x SNP, 1 x Labour, 1 x Conservative
- 2012-2017 Change: 1 x Conservative gain from Labour

Livingston North - 4 seats
Party	Candidate	FPv%	Count						
Party	Candidate	FPv%	1	2	3	4	5	6	7
Conservative	Alison Adamson	25.45%	1,940						
Labour	Dom McGuire	13.03%	993	1,077	1,092	1,209	1,898		
SNP	Robert De Bold (incumbent)	16.31%	1,243	1,254	1,279	1,303	1,327	1,347	2,161
SNP	Andrew Miller (incumbent)	15.35%	1,170	1,175	1,207	1,235	1,260	1,297	1,606
SNP	Lorna Menzies Craig	14.53%	1,107	1,115	1,141	1,163	1,181	1,210	
Labour	Anne McMillan (incumbent)	9.52%	726	764	782	853			
Liberal Democrats	Caron Lindsay	3.28%	250	360	417				
Green	Mark Wilkinson	2.53%	193	213					
Electorate: TBC Valid: 7,622 Spoilt: 123 Quota: 1,525 Turnout: 43.5%

=== Livingston South ===
- 2012: 2 x Labour, 2 x SNP
- 2017: 2 x SNP, 1 x Labour, 1 x Conservative
- 2012-2017 Change: 1 x Conservative gain from Labour

Livingston South - 4 seats
Party	Candidate	FPv%	Count						
Party	Candidate	FPv%	1	2	3	4	5	6	7
Labour	Lawrence Fitzpatrick (incumbent)	27.12%	2,228						
SNP	Peter Johnston (incumbent) †	20.69%	1,700						
Conservative	Peter Heggie	19.40%	1,594	1,673					
SNP	Moira Shemilt	13.02%	1,070	1,109	1,151	1,151	1,169	1,268	1,827
Labour	Danny Logue (incumbent)	8.41%	691	1,080	1,083	1,091	1,137	1,216	1,241
SNP	Annmargaret Watson	7.17%	589	593	598	599	602	620	
Green	Jayne Glass	2.44%	200	221	223	225	275		
Liberal Democrats	Jill Pattle	1.75%	144	154	155	160			
Electorate: TBC Valid: 8,216 Spoilt: 140 Quota: 1,644 Turnout: 46.3%

=== East Livingston and East Calder ===
- 2012: 2 x Labour, 2 x SNP
- 2017: 2 x SNP, 1 x Labour, 1 x Conservative
- 2012-2017 Change: 1 x Conservative gain from Labour

East Livingston and East Calder - 4 seats
Party	Candidate	FPv%	Count						
Party	Candidate	FPv%	1	2	3	4	5	6	7
Labour	Dave King (incumbent)††	23.75%	1,749						
Conservative	Damian Timson	22.00%	1,620						
SNP	Frank Anderson (incumbent)	20.09%	1,479						
SNP	Carl John (incumbent)	13.20%	972	994	998	1,002	1,014	1,105	1,648
Labour	Scott Rogers	7.13%	525	724	765	766	829	918	941
SNP	Veronica Smith	7.54%	555	561	564	565	578	652	
Green	Neal Drummond	3.60%	265	274	284	285	366		
Liberal Democrats	Charles Corser	2.69%	198	208	239	239			
Electorate: TBC Valid: 7,363 Spoilt: 141 Quota: 1,473 Turnout: 45.9%

=== Fauldhouse and the Breich Valley ===
- 2012: 2 x Labour, 1 x SNP
- 2017: 2 x Labour, 1 x SNP
- 2012-2017 Change: No Change

Fauldhouse and the Breich Valley - 3 seats
Party	Candidate	FPv%	Count					
Party	Candidate	FPv%	1	2	3	4	5	6
Labour	David Dodds (incumbent)	29.81%	1,623					
SNP	Pauline Clark	18.53%	1,012	1,022	1,035	1,079	1,781	
Labour	Cathy Muldoon (incumbent)	17.68%	966	1,070	1,206	1,233	1,293	1,417
Conservative	Marion Kerr	15.23%	832	842	867	892	896	920
SNP	Greg McCarra (incumbent)	14.33%	783	787	794	817		
Green	Pamela Barnes	2.25%	123	128	162			
Liberal Democrats	Kenneth Brown	2.27%	124	127				
Electorate: TBC Valid: 5,463 Spoilt: 159 Quota: 1,366 Turnout: 46.6%

=== Whitburn and Blackburn ===
- 2012: 2 x Labour, 2 x SNP
- 2017: 2 x Labour, 1 x SNP, 1 x Conservative
- 2012-2017 Change: 1 x Conservative gain from SNP

Whitburn and Blackburn - 4 seats
Party	Candidate	FPv%	Count						
Party	Candidate	FPv%	1	2	3	4	5	6	7
Labour	George Paul (incumbent)	28.08%	1,822						
SNP	Jim Dickson (incumbent)	24.44%	1,586						
Conservative	Bruce Fairbairn	21.99%	1,427						
Labour	Kirsteen Sullivan	8.59%	557	1,015	1,020	1,054	1,149	1,209	1,486
SNP	Mary Dickson (incumbent)	7.75%	503	519	742	744	766	1,129	
SNP	John Leslie	6.47%	420	426	468	470	481		
Liberal Democrats	Bob Howden	2.68%	174	182	186	224			
Electorate: TBC Valid: 6,489 Spoilt: 175 Quota: 1,298 Turnout: 42.6%

=== Bathgate ===
- 2012: 2 x Labour, 2 x SNP
- 2017: 2xLabour; 1xSNP; 1xConservative
- 2012-2017 Change: Conservative gain one seat from SNP

Bathgate - 4 seats
Party	Candidate	FPv%	Count						
Party	Candidate	FPv%	1	2	3	4	5	6	7
SNP	William Hannah Boyle (incumbent)	20.20%	1,554						
Labour	Harry Cartmill (incumbent)	21.40%	1,646						
Labour	John McGinty (incumbent)	14.98%	1,152	1,227	1,228	1,257	1,278	1,291	1,597
Conservative	Charles Kennedy	17.93%	1,379	1,388	1,389	1,400	1,409	1,413	1,574
SNP	Barry Burrows	8.49%	653	658	668	675	709	1,031	1,176
Independent	James Walker	9.68%	745	752	752	765	795	806	
SNP	Lisa McArthur	4.50%	346	347	350	355	380		
Green	Dale McDowell	1.56%	120	122	123	143			
Liberal Democrats	Fiona Ann Stevens	1.26%	97	98	98				
Electorate: TBC Valid: 7,692 Spoilt: 174 Quota: 1,539 Turnout: 45.1%

=== Armadale and Blackridge ===
- 2012: 1 x Independent, 1 x Labour, 1 x SNP
- 2017: 1 x Independent, 1 x Labour, 1 x SNP
- 2012-2017 Change: No Change

Armadale and Blackridge - 3 seats
Party	Candidate	FPv%	Count					
Party	Candidate	FPv%	1	2	3	4	5	6
Independent	Stuart Borrowman (incumbent)	45.02%	2,343					
SNP	Sarah King (incumbent)	25.41%	1,322					
Labour	Andrew McGuire	13.59%	707	1,012	1,016	1,056	1,131	1,589
Conservative	Ian Burgess	13.89%	723	1,016	1,017	1,035	1,057	
Green	Paula Stokes	1.19%	62	149	157	189		
Liberal Democrats	Chris Smillie	0.90%	47	117	118			
Electorate: TBC Valid: 5,204 Spoilt: 56 Quota: 1,302 Turnout: 42.20%

== Aftermath ==
On 26 October 2021 Broxburn, Uphall and Winchburgh Labour councillor Angela Doran-Timson left the Labour Party and joined the Conservatives.

=== Livingston South by-election ===
On 29 March 2020, Livingston South SNP councillor Peter Johnston resigned his seat due to illness. The by-election was postponed due to the ongoing Coronavirus Pandemic. The by-election was held on 11 March 2021 and was won by SNP candidate, Maria MacAulay.

Livingston South by-election (11 March 2021) - 1 seat
Party	Candidate	FPv%	Count						
Party	Candidate	FPv%	1	2	3	4	5	6	7
SNP	Maria MacAulay	43.9%	2,465	2,467	2,496	2,603	2,703	2,763	3,370
Labour	Gordon Connolly	24.6%	1,382	1,384	1,419	1,481	1,579	2,098	
Conservative	Douglas Smith	17.6%	989	996	1,025	1,037	1,124		
Independent	Eddie Millar	5.9%	332	338	365	413			
Green	Cameron Glasgow	4.2%	234	234	273				
Liberal Democrats	Caron Lindsay	3.3%	185	186					
UKIP	John Mumford	0.5%	29						
Electorate: 18,784 Valid: 5,616 Spoilt: 52 Quota: 2,809 Turnout: 30.2%

=== East Livingston and East Calder by-election ===
On 11 May 2021, East Livingston and East Calder Labour councillor Dave King died. A by-election was held on 5 August 2021 and was won by SNP candidate, Thomas Ullathorne.

East Livingston and East Calder by-election (5 August 2021) - 1 seat
Party	Candidate	FPv%	Count				
Party	Candidate	FPv%	1	2	3	4	5
SNP	Thomas Ullathorne	42.5	1,890	1,906	1,918	2,122	2,368
Conservative	David Philip	24.4	1,085	1,088	1,103	1,131	1,425
Labour	Danny Logue	21.8	969	972	1,012	1,094	
Green	Neal Drummond	7.6	336	343	377		
Liberal Democrats	Hans Edginton	2.7	118	122			
ISP	John Hannah	1.1	47				
Electorate: 17,866 Valid: 4,445 Spoilt: 48 Quota: 2,223 Turnout: 25.1%
