= Linlithgow Burgh Halls =

Municipal building in Linlithgow, Scotland

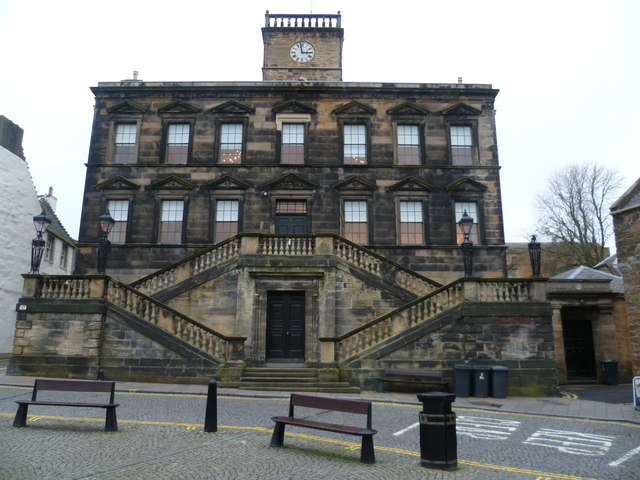
- Linlithgow Burgh Halls

- Shown in West Lothian
- 55.9774°N 3.6006°W
- Location: The Cross, Linlithgow

History
- Built: 1670

Site notes
- Architect: John Smith
- Architectural style: Neoclassical style

Listed Building – Category A
- Official name: The Cross and Kirkgate, Burgh Halls (former town house and old county hall)
- Designated: 22 February 1971
- Reference no.: LB37362

Listed Building – Category B
- Official name: The Cross and Kirkgate, Burgh Halls (former town house and old county hall)
- Designated: 22 February 1971
- Reference no.: LB37465

Linlithgow Burgh Halls is a municipal structure at The Cross, Linlithgow, Scotland. The complex includes the Town House, the former headquarters of Linlithgow Burgh Council, which is a Category A listed building, and the Old County Hall, the former headquarters of West Lothian County Council, which is a Category B listed building.

== History ==
The first municipal building in the town was a medieval tolbooth with a large bell tower: it was demolished on the orders of the Lord Protector, Oliver Cromwell, to provide improved access to Linlithgow Palace, in 1650.

Following the Stuart Restoration, burgh leaders decided to commission a new town house: the new building was designed by John Smith in the neoclassical style, built by Robert Mylne in ashlar stone and was completed in late 1670. The design involved a symmetrical main frontage with seven bays facing onto The Cross; the central bay featured a square headed doorway on the first floor which was originally accessed by a single flight of stone steps and was surmounted by a pediment with the burgh coat of arms in the tympanum. The town house was fenestrated on the first and second floors by sash windows which were surmounted by pediments containing crowns, fleurs-de-lys, thistles and roses. Internally, the ground floor was used as a weigh house and as a prison while the upper floors were used as reception rooms.

A six-stage tower, which, as well as being balustraded, was originally surmounted by a belfry and weather vane, was erected to the immediate north of the town house in 1678. The steps to the first floor of the town house were replaced by a wrought iron loggia, which facilitated access to the market hall, in 1810, and a northern wing, designed by William Burn and built behind the right hand three bays of the town house at a cost of £1,706, was completed in 1821. Following a serious fire in 1847, the town house was restored to a design by Thomas Brown in 1848. A clock, designed and manufactured by Messrs Mackenzie of Glasgow, was installed in to tower in 1857: it was the first turret clock in Scotland to use the same gravity escapement principles that had been developed for the clock in the tower at the Palace of Westminster. Court hearings, which had previously taken place within the building, were relocated to the new Linlithgow Sheriff Court on the south side of the High Street in 1863.

Following the implementation of the Local Government (Scotland) Act 1889 which established a uniform system of county councils in Scotland, the new West Lothian County Council established its headquarters in the northern wing which became known as the county hall. The wrought iron loggia was replaced by stone double staircase which was designed by William Malcolm Scott and completed in 1907.

The northern wing was vacated by West Lothian County Council when it moved to the new county hall on the south side of The Cross in 1940 and Queen Elizabeth II, accompanied by the Duke of Edinburgh, visited the town house and signed the visitors' book in July 1955. Much of the original interior of the complex was removed in a modernisation project carried out to a design by Rowand Anderson Kininmonth & Paul in 1962; following the works, the complex, consisting of the town house and the northern wing, became known as the Linlithgow Burgh Halls.

The complex continued to serve as the headquarters of the burgh council for much of the 20th century but ceased to be local seat of government after the enlarged West Lothian District Council was formed at Bathgate in 1975. It was in the Burgh Halls that, in January 1979, the Scottish National Party launched its "Yes for Scotland" campaign in anticipation of the forthcoming Scottish devolution referendum.

An extensive programme of works, undertaken to a design by Malcolm Fraser, funded in part by Heritage Lottery Fund and costing £5.2 million, was completed in September 2011: the works led to the creation of an art gallery on the first floor, two function rooms and a roof terrace. The two function rooms were named the Baillie Hardie Hall (on the second floor of the old town house) and the Provost Lawrie Hall (in the northern wing). (Note: James Lawrie served as provost from 1961 to 1964 during the period of modernisation.) The building was also used as a location for the legal drama Garrow's Law in 2011.

== See also ==
- List of listed buildings in Linlithgow, West Lothian
- List of Category A listed buildings in West Lothian
