= List of listed buildings in Linlithgow, West Lothian =

Linlithgow parish shown within West Lothian

This is a list of listed buildings in the parish of Linlithgow in West Lothian, Scotland.

== List ==
Name	Location	Date listed	Geo-coordinates	Notes	Category	LB number	Image
26, 28 High Street			55°58′37″N 3°35′50″W		C(S)	37435	Upload Photo
74, 76 High Street			55°58′37″N 3°35′56″W		C(S)	37446	Upload Photo
Linlithgow Palace, Gate-House			55°58′41″N 3°36′03″W		A	37470	Upload another image See more images
19 Lion Well Wynd And Boundary Wall			55°58′32″N 3°36′15″W		C(S)	37475	Upload Photo
2 Royal Terrace			55°58′31″N 3°36′11″W		C(S)	37491	Upload Photo
Edinburgh Road, St Magdalene's Distillery East Barns			55°58′36″N 3°35′27″W		C(S)	37370	Upload Photo
Friarsbrae, Rivaldsgreen House With Gatepiers And Boundary Walls			55°58′21″N 3°36′11″W		B	37377	Upload Photo
Friarsbrae, Victoria Place With Boundary Walls			55°58′27″N 3°36′07″W		B	37380	Upload Photo
High Street, Court House			55°58′35″N 3°36′05″W		B	37400	Upload another image
103, 105 High Street			55°58′35″N 3°36′07″W		C(S)	37402	Upload Photo
169-173 (Odd Nos) High Street			55°58′34″N 3°36′17″W		C(S)	37417	Upload Photo
201,203, 205 High Street			55°58′33″N 3°36′21″W		C(S)	37420	Upload Photo
217-221 (Odd Nos) High Street			55°58′33″N 3°36′22″W		C(S)	37422	Upload Photo
293 High Street			55°58′33″N 3°36′33″W		B	37429	Upload another image
2, 4 High Street			55°58′37″N 3°35′47″W		C(S)	37432	Upload Photo
Hiltly Farm With Gatepiers And Enclosing Walls			55°57′42″N 3°35′43″W		B	12975	Upload Photo
Linlithgow Bridge, 2-14 (Even Nos) Main Street, Chalmers Cottages			55°58′34″N 3°37′34″W		B	12976	Upload Photo
Preston House Lodge With Gates And Gatepiers			55°57′59″N 3°36′18″W		B	12984	Upload Photo
Bonnytoun Cottages			55°59′23″N 3°35′27″W		C(S)	7470	Upload Photo
Bridgend Farm			55°58′08″N 3°32′04″W		B	7472	Upload Photo
Champfleurie Home Farm			55°58′17″N 3°32′50″W		B	7477	Upload Photo
Champfleurie House With Lodge, Gatepiers And Boundary Wall			55°58′14″N 3°32′51″W		B	7478	Upload Photo
Edinburgh Road Kingscavil Cottages, Including Former Schoolhouse			55°58′18″N 3°33′20″W		A	7482	Upload another image
36, 36A High Street			55°58′37″N 3°35′51″W		B	37437	Upload another image
50 High Street Red Lion Inn			55°58′37″N 3°35′53″W		B	37440	Upload Photo
100 High Street			55°58′38″N 3°35′59″W		C(S)	37450	Upload Photo
114 High Street			55°58′38″N 3°36′00″W		C(S)	37452	Upload Photo
232, 234 And 236 High Street			55°58′34″N 3°36′19″W		B	37459	Upload another image
2 Kirkgate			55°58′39″N 3°36′04″W		B	37463	Upload Photo
Kirkgate, Walls			55°58′40″N 3°36′03″W		B	37467	Upload Photo
Manse Road, Canal Basin, Cottages And Stables			55°58′30″N 3°35′54″W		B	37479	Upload Photo
Manse Road Canal House With Gig House Gatepiers And Boundary Wall			55°58′30″N 3°35′56″W		B	37480	Upload Photo
Manse Road, Edinburgh And Glasgow Union Canal Bridge 43			55°58′31″N 3°35′50″W		B	37482	Upload another image See more images
5 Union Road With Boundary Wall			55°58′32″N 3°36′17″W		C(S)	37502	Upload Photo
26 West Port			55°58′34″N 3°36′43″W		C(S)	37507	Upload Photo
Bathgate Road, Ashley Hall			55°58′30″N 3°36′42″W		B	37355	Upload Photo
23 High Street			55°58′36″N 3°35′51″W		C(S)	37384	Upload Photo
49, 51 High Street			55°58′36″N 3°35′56″W		B	37389	Upload another image
63 High Street With Railings			55°58′36″N 3°35′59″W		B	37393	Upload another image
107, 109 High Street			55°58′35″N 3°36′07″W		C(S)	37403	Upload Photo
111, 113 High Street, Football And Cricketers Arms			55°58′35″N 3°36′08″W		C(S)	37404	Upload another image See more images
115 High Street, Football And Cricketers Arms			55°58′35″N 3°36′08″W		C(S)	37405	Upload another image See more images
129 High Street			55°58′34″N 3°36′11″W		B	37407	Upload another image
137-141 (Odd Nos) High Street			55°58′33″N 3°36′12″W		C(S)	37409	Upload Photo
Grange House With Conservatory, Terrace Garden, Pavilions, Loggia And Sundial			55°59′29″N 3°36′15″W		A	12972	Upload Photo
Linlithgow Bridge, Main Street, Public Hall (Community Centre)			55°58′33″N 3°37′35″W		B	12977	Upload Photo
Woodcockdale, Edinburgh And Glasgow Union Canal Stables And Cottages			55°57′54″N 3°38′32″W		A	12989	Upload another image See more images
Burghmuir Farmhouse And Steading With Horsemill			55°59′06″N 3°34′10″W		C(S)	7475	Upload Photo
Easter Carribber Farmhouse And Steading			55°57′26″N 3°39′05″W		B	7481	Upload Photo
Union Road, Railway Wall (To N Of Track) Including Rail Bridge To E			55°58′33″N 3°36′02″W		C(S)	46268	Upload Photo
70, 72 High Street			55°58′37″N 3°35′55″W		C(S)	37445	Upload Photo
212, 214 High Street			55°58′35″N 3°36′16″W		B	37453	Upload another image
246, 248 High Street			55°58′34″N 3°36′21″W		C(S)	37461	Upload Photo
Kirkgate, Rosegarden, Statue Of 1St Marquess Of Linlithgow			55°58′40″N 3°36′00″W		B	37466	Upload another image
13 Lion Well Wynd			55°58′33″N 3°36′15″W		B	37473	Upload Photo
The Maltings, Corner Mains Road And Moray Drive, Mains And Cottages			55°58′21″N 3°37′15″W		C(S)	37478	Upload Photo
Manse Road, Clarendon House With Gatepiers, Boundary Walls, And Stables			55°58′24″N 3°35′38″W		B	37481	Upload Photo
7, 7A Royal Terrace With Coach House, Outbuildings, Gates, Gatepiers, Railings And Boundary Wall			55°58′29″N 3°36′15″W		B	37493	Upload Photo
St Michael's Parish Church (Church Of Scotland) With Gateway And Livingston Burial Vault			55°58′41″N 3°36′01″W		A	37499	Upload another image See more images
Union Road, St John's Evangelical Church			55°58′30″N 3°36′26″W		C(S)	37505	Upload Photo
12, 14 West Port The Black Bitch Hotel			55°58′33″N 3°36′40″W		C(S)	37506	Upload another image
Bonnytoun House With Walled Garden And Ornamental Stack			55°59′08″N 3°35′11″W		B	37360	Upload Photo
Braehead, Edinburgh And Glasgow Union Canal Bridge 46			55°58′07″N 3°36′49″W		B	37361	Upload another image
9-17 And 19-21 (Odd Nos) High Street			55°58′36″N 3°35′49″W		B	37382	Upload another image
69, 71 High Street			55°58′36″N 3°36′00″W		C(S)	37395	Upload Photo
High Street, Police Station			55°58′34″N 3°36′05″W		C(S)	37401	Upload another image
123-127 (Odd Nos) High Street			55°58′35″N 3°36′10″W		B	37406	Upload another image
131-135 High Street			55°58′34″N 3°36′11″W		B	37408	Upload another image
143 High Street, Annet House			55°58′34″N 3°36′12″W		B	37410	Upload another image
149 High Street			55°58′34″N 3°36′14″W		C(S)	37413	Upload Photo
High Street, St Peter`S (Episcopal) Church			55°58′34″N 3°36′14″W		B	37414	Upload another image
175 High Street			55°58′34″N 3°36′17″W		C(S)	37418	Upload Photo
263, 265 (Odd Nos) High Street			55°58′33″N 3°36′28″W		B	37425	Upload another image
10-18 (Even Nos) High Street			55°58′37″N 3°35′48″W		C(S)	37433	Upload Photo
Gateside Steading			55°57′56″N 3°31′28″W		B	12971	Upload another image
Williamcraigs House, Garden Pavilion And Gatepiers			55°57′38″N 3°37′35″W		B	12987	Upload Photo
20-24 (Even Nos) High Street			55°58′37″N 3°35′50″W		B	37434	Upload Photo
30-34 (Even Nos) High Street			55°58′37″N 3°35′51″W		B	37436	Upload Photo
52 And 54 High Street			55°58′37″N 3°35′53″W		B	37441	Upload Photo
82-86 (Even Nos) High Street			55°58′37″N 3°35′57″W		C(S)	37448	Upload Photo
222, 224 High Street			55°58′35″N 3°36′17″W		C(S)	37457	Upload Photo
238 High Street			55°58′34″N 3°36′20″W		C(S)	37460	Upload Photo
258, 260 High Street			55°58′34″N 3°36′22″W		C(S)	37462	Upload Photo
Learmonth Gardens, Dovecot			55°58′32″N 3°35′54″W		A	37468	Upload another image See more images
Linlithgow Palace And Fountain			55°58′43″N 3°36′03″W		A	37469	Upload another image See more images
Lion Well Wynd Walls			55°58′33″N 3°36′16″W		C(S)	37477	Upload Photo
Manse Road, Friarbank With Gates, Gatepiers And Boundary Wall			55°58′23″N 3°35′51″W		B	37483	Upload Photo
Manse Road, Nether Parkley			55°58′21″N 3°35′54″W		B	37485	Upload Photo
Manse Road, Nether Parkley Lodge, Gatepiers And Boundary Walls			55°58′19″N 3°35′51″W		B	37486	Upload Photo
Preston Road, Poldrait			55°58′11″N 3°36′19″W		B	37489	Upload Photo
13 Royal Terrace With Boundary Walls And Piers			55°58′28″N 3°36′17″W		C(S)	37496	Upload Photo
14 Royal Terrace With Boundary Walls And Piers			55°58′29″N 3°36′18″W		B	37497	Upload Photo
St Michael's Wynd Rear 23 High Street			55°58′35″N 3°35′51″W		C(S)	37500	Upload Photo
4, 4A, 5, 5A Strawberry Bank			55°58′31″N 3°36′08″W		C(S)	37501	Upload Photo
The Cross And Kirkgate, Burgh Halls (Former Town House And Old Country Hall)			55°58′39″N 3°36′02″W		A	37362	Upload another image
13, 14 The Cross			55°58′38″N 3°36′00″W		C(S)	37366	Upload Photo
Edinburgh Road, Edinburgh And Glasgow Union Canal Aqueduct			55°58′33″N 3°35′05″W		B	37368	Upload Photo
Falkirk Road, St Ninian's Craigmailen Church, Boundary Wall And Gatepiers			55°58′34″N 3°36′49″W		B	37373	Upload Photo
Falkirk Road, Westerpark With Former Coach-House			55°58′31″N 3°36′53″W		C(S)	37374	Upload Photo
Friarsbrae, Douglas Cottage (Former Douglas Cottage School)			55°58′28″N 3°36′06″W		B	37375	Upload Photo
Friarsbrae, Rosemount			55°58′27″N 3°36′04″W		B	37379	Upload Photo
33-37 (Odd Nos) High Street			55°58′36″N 3°35′54″W		C(S)	37386	Upload Photo
65, 67 High Street, The Four Marys			55°58′36″N 3°35′59″W		C(S)	37394	Upload another image See more images
161, 161C, 163 High Street			55°58′34″N 3°36′16″W		C(S)	37415	Upload Photo
High Street, New Well			55°58′33″N 3°36′25″W		C(S)	37423	Upload Photo
303 To 313 And 315 And 325 (Odd Nos) High Street And Gateway			55°58′32″N 3°36′38″W		B	37431	Upload another image
Ochiltree Castle & Castlegate (Former Ochiltree Place) With Boundary Wall			55°57′22″N 3°33′03″W		A	12978	Upload Photo
Pardovan, Edinburgh And Glasgow Union Canal Bridge 40			55°58′36″N 3°32′21″W		B	12979	Upload Photo
Park, Edinburgh And Glasgow Union Canal Bridge 41			55°58′34″N 3°33′28″W		B	12980	Upload another image See more images
Philipstoun Main Street Pardovan Church			55°58′36″N 3°31′42″W		B	12982	Upload Photo
48 Woodcockvale, Edinburgh And Glasgow Union Canal Bridge 48			55°57′52″N 3°38′42″W		B	12988	Upload Photo
Belsyde House With Lodge, Gatepiers And Boundary Walls			55°57′41″N 3°38′39″W		B	7469	Upload Photo
Falkirk Road, Longcroft House			55°58′40″N 3°37′02″W		B	7483	Upload Photo
Linlithgow Palace, Lodge			55°58′41″N 3°36′05″W		C(S)	37471	Upload another image
Linlithgow Railway Station			55°58′35″N 3°35′45″W		C(S)	37472	Upload another image See more images
17 Lion Well Wynd And Boundary Wall			55°58′33″N 3°36′15″W		B	37474	Upload Photo
10 And 11 Royal Terrace With Boundary Walls And Gatepiers			55°58′30″N 3°36′16″W		B	37495	Upload Photo
Wilcoxholm, Edinburgh And Glasgow Union Canal Bridge 42			55°58′38″N 3°34′21″W		B	37508	Upload another image See more images
11 The Cross			55°58′38″N 3°36′01″W		C(S)	37364	Upload Photo
The Cross, Cross Well With Pedestal And Commemorative Stone			55°58′38″N 3°36′02″W		B	37367	Upload another image
Falkirk Road, Longcroft House Gatepiers And Boundary Wall			55°58′33″N 3°36′47″W		C(S)	37372	Upload Photo
Friarsbrae, Edinburgh And Glasgow Union Canal Bridge 44			55°58′28″N 3°36′10″W		B	37376	Upload another image
Friarsbrae, Rivaldsgreen Coach House			55°58′21″N 3°36′10″W		C(S)	37378	Upload Photo
39,41 High Street			55°58′36″N 3°35′54″W		B	37387	Upload another image
43-47 (Odd Nos) High Street			55°58′36″N 3°35′56″W		B	37388	Upload another image
High Street, County Buildings With Screen Wall Lamp Standards And Provost's Lamp			55°58′35″N 3°36′03″W		B	37399	Upload another image
213, 215 High Street			55°58′33″N 3°36′21″W		B	37421	Upload another image
297, 299 High Street, West Port House With Retaining Walls			55°58′33″N 3°36′34″W		A	37430	Upload another image
Grange House Stables And Cottage			55°59′32″N 3°36′17″W		C(S)	12973	Upload Photo
Wairdlaw Lime Kilns			55°56′24″N 3°36′36″W		B	12986	Upload Photo
Avon Aqueduct, Edinburgh And Glasgow Union Canal Aqueduct			55°57′51″N 3°39′22″W		A	7468	Upload Photo
Burgh Mill Lane, Burgh Mill House And Adjoining Outbuilding			55°58′29″N 3°37′52″W		C(S)	7474	Upload Photo
Cauldhame Farmhouse, Steading And Horsemill			55°57′42″N 3°34′59″W		B	7476	Upload Photo
259, 261 High Street			55°58′33″N 3°36′28″W		B	47560	Upload another image
78, 80 High Street			55°58′37″N 3°35′56″W		B	37447	Upload Photo
3 Kirkgate			55°58′39″N 3°36′04″W		B	37464	Upload another image
Blackness Road, St Michael's Church And Presbytery (Roman Catholic)			55°58′44″N 3°35′41″W		B	37359	Upload another image See more images
12 The Cross			55°58′38″N 3°36′01″W		C(S)	37365	Upload Photo
Edinburgh Road, Rosebank			55°58′35″N 3°35′10″W		C(S)	37369	Upload Photo
High Street, St Michael's Well			55°58′36″N 3°35′51″W		A	37383	Upload another image
29, 31 High Street Post Office			55°58′35″N 3°35′52″W		B	37385	Upload another image
89, 91 High Street			55°58′37″N 3°36′02″W		B	37398	Upload another image
145 High Street			55°58′34″N 3°36′13″W		C(S)	37411	Upload Photo
257 High Street			55°58′33″N 3°36′28″W		B	37424	Upload another image
275 High Street And 18, 20 St John's Avenue			55°58′33″N 3°36′30″W		B	37428	Upload another image
Grange House, Walled Garden			55°59′27″N 3°36′24″W		C(S)	12974	Upload Photo
Airngarth Hill, Hope Monument			55°59′37″N 3°36′00″W		B	7467	Upload Photo
Bonnytoun Home Farm And Adjoining Steading			55°59′15″N 3°35′28″W		B	7471	Upload Photo
East Belsyde, Edinburgh And Glasgow Union Canal Bridge 47			55°58′01″N 3°38′14″W		B	7480	Upload another image See more images
56-60 (Even Nos) High Street			55°58′37″N 3°35′53″W		C(S)	37442	Upload Photo
62, 64 High Street			55°58′37″N 3°35′54″W		C(S)	37443	Upload Photo
212, 214 Rear High Street, Former Tannery			55°58′36″N 3°36′16″W		C(S)	37454	Upload Photo
220 High Street			55°58′35″N 3°36′17″W		C(S)	37456	Upload Photo
High Street, Baird Hall			55°58′34″N 3°36′18″W		C(S)	37458	Upload Photo
Kirkgate And The Cross, Burgh Halls (Former Town House And Old County Hall)			55°58′39″N 3°36′02″W		B	37465	Upload Photo
16 Lion Well Wynd And Boundary Wall			55°58′32″N 3°36′16″W		C(S)	37476	Upload Photo
Manse Road, Glebe House, Former Linlithgow Manse With Gatepiers And Boundary Wall			55°58′10″N 3°35′48″W		B	37484	Upload Photo
1 Royal Terrace With Boundary Wall			55°58′31″N 3°36′10″W		C(S)	37490	Upload Photo
6 Royal Terrace			55°58′30″N 3°36′13″W		B	37492	Upload Photo
8, 9 Royal Terrace With Boundary Walls And Gatepiers			55°58′30″N 3°36′15″W		B	37494	Upload Photo
Union Road, Lindisfarne With Boundary Walls And Gate			55°58′30″N 3°36′27″W		B	37504	Upload Photo
Bell's Burn, Baron's Hill			55°58′43″N 3°35′33″W		B	37356	Upload Photo
57, 59 High Street			55°58′36″N 3°35′58″W		C(S)	37391	Upload Photo
147 High Street			55°58′34″N 3°36′13″W		C(S)	37412	Upload Photo
165 High Street			55°58′34″N 3°36′16″W		B	37416	Upload another image
177, 179 (Odd Nos) High Street The Crown Arms			55°58′33″N 3°36′18″W		B	37419	Upload another image
Philipstoun, Edinburgh And Glasgow Union Canal Aqueduct			55°58′32″N 3°31′30″W		B	12981	Upload Photo
Preston House Including Screen Wall And Coach Archway			55°57′54″N 3°36′37″W		A	12983	Upload Photo
38-44 (Even Nos) High Street, Hamilton's Land			55°58′37″N 3°35′52″W		A	37438	Upload another image
46, 48 High Street, Hamiltons' Land			55°58′37″N 3°35′52″W		A	37439	Upload Photo
66, 68 High Street			55°58′37″N 3°35′54″W		C(S)	37444	Upload Photo
96, 98 High Street			55°58′38″N 3°35′58″W		C(S)	37449	Upload Photo
102, 104 High Street			55°58′38″N 3°35′59″W		C(S)	37451	Upload Photo
216, 218 High Street			55°58′35″N 3°36′16″W		C(S)	37455	Upload Photo
Market Lane, Masonic Lodge Of Linlithgow			55°58′39″N 3°36′01″W		C(S)	37487	Upload another image
1-3 (Odd Nos) Preston Road			55°58′32″N 3°36′39″W		B	37488	Upload Photo
20 Royal Terrace With Retaining Wall And Railings			55°58′29″N 3°36′23″W		C(S)	37498	Upload Photo
6 Union Road And Lion Well Wynd			55°58′31″N 3°36′16″W		C(S)	37503	Upload Photo
Back Station Road, Edinburgh And Glasgow Union Canal Aqueduct			55°58′33″N 3°35′42″W		B	37354	Upload Photo
Blackness Road, Boghall Lodge			55°59′03″N 3°34′48″W		B	37357	Upload Photo
Blackness Road, Low Port Primary School, (Former Linlithgow Academy)			55°58′42″N 3°35′48″W		B	37358	Upload another image
5 The Cross, Cross House			55°58′38″N 3°36′04″W		A	37363	Upload another image
Edinburgh Road, St Magdalene's Distillery Malting Barn And Double Kiln			55°58′35″N 3°35′33″W		C(S)	37371	Upload another image See more images
1 High Street, The Star And Garter Hotel			55°58′37″N 3°35′47″W		B	37381	Upload another image See more images
53, 55 High Street With Gateways, Gatepiers, Gates And Railings The Royal Bank Of Scotland			55°58′36″N 3°35′57″W		B	37390	Upload another image
61 High Street			55°58′36″N 3°35′58″W		C(S)	37392	Upload Photo
73,75 High Street			55°58′36″N 3°36′00″W		C(S)	37396	Upload Photo
77, 79 High Street			55°58′37″N 3°36′01″W		C(S)	37397	Upload Photo
267, 269 High Street			55°58′33″N 3°36′29″W		C(S)	37426	Upload Photo
271, 273 High Street The Portcullis			55°58′33″N 3°36′29″W		C(S)	37427	Upload Photo
Gateside Farmhouse With Gig-House And Boundary Wall			55°57′56″N 3°31′26″W		C(S)	12970	Upload Photo
River Avon, Edinburgh To Glasgow Railway Viaduct			55°58′29″N 3°38′00″W		A	12985	Upload another image See more images
Bridgend Farmhouse			55°58′09″N 3°32′00″W		B	7473	Upload Photo

== Key ==
The scheme for classifying buildings in Scotland is:

- Category A: "buildings of national or international importance, either architectural or historic; or fine, little-altered examples of some particular period, style or building type."
- Category B: "buildings of regional or more than local importance; or major examples of some particular period, style or building type, which may have been altered."
- Category C: "buildings of local importance; lesser examples of any period, style, or building type, as originally constructed or moderately altered; and simple traditional buildings which group well with other listed buildings."

In March 2016 there were 47,288 listed buildings in Scotland. Of these, 8% were Category A, and 50% were Category B, with the remaining 42% being Category C.
