= Scottish Institute of Theatre, Dance, Film and Television =

Educational institution in Livingston, Scotland

Coordinates: 55.8791°N 3.5265°W

- Former name: MGA Academy of Performing Arts
- Type: Private
- Active: 2006–2025
- Affiliations: Council for Dance, Drama and Musical Theatre
- Principal: Mark Langley
- Location: Livingston, West Lothian, Scotland
- Campus: 30,000 sq ft; Urban

The Scottish Institute of Theatre, Dance, Film and Television was a specialist private educational college and institute of further education in Livingston, West Lothian, Scotland. The Institute went into liquidation on 6 May 2025 and ceased trading. Degrees were awarded by Bath Spa University and the closure meant many students were unable to complete their studies. The institute had received funding from West Lothian Council, Creative Scotland and the Scottish Government. The institute was associated with Silver Rock Film Studios in Ireland. Until its closure, the institute was the only school in Scotland accredited by the Council for Dance, Drama and Musical Theatre (CDMT).

== History ==
Established in 2006, the institute was founded as the 'MGA Academy of Performing Arts' in Edinburgh, with its main campus being situated in Balgreen. In September 2023, the academy moved to a new 30,000 square foot campus in Livingston. In November 2023, the Institute held its first public open day at its new campus.

In April 2024, it was renamed The Scottish Institute of Theatre, Dance, Film and Television. On 25 April 2024, the Livingston campus of the institute was officially opened. The Principal of the institute was Mark Langley, who was appointed in May 2024.

Despite taking new students in March 2025, the Institute ceased operation in May 2025 due to insolvency and entered liquidation under Middlebrooks Business Recovery.

== Courses ==
The institute offered undergraduate and postgraduate courses in the performing arts, including courses in music, dance, theatre and drama, as well as film and television studies.
