= Pates Hill Wind Farm =

Wind farm in West Lothian, Scotland

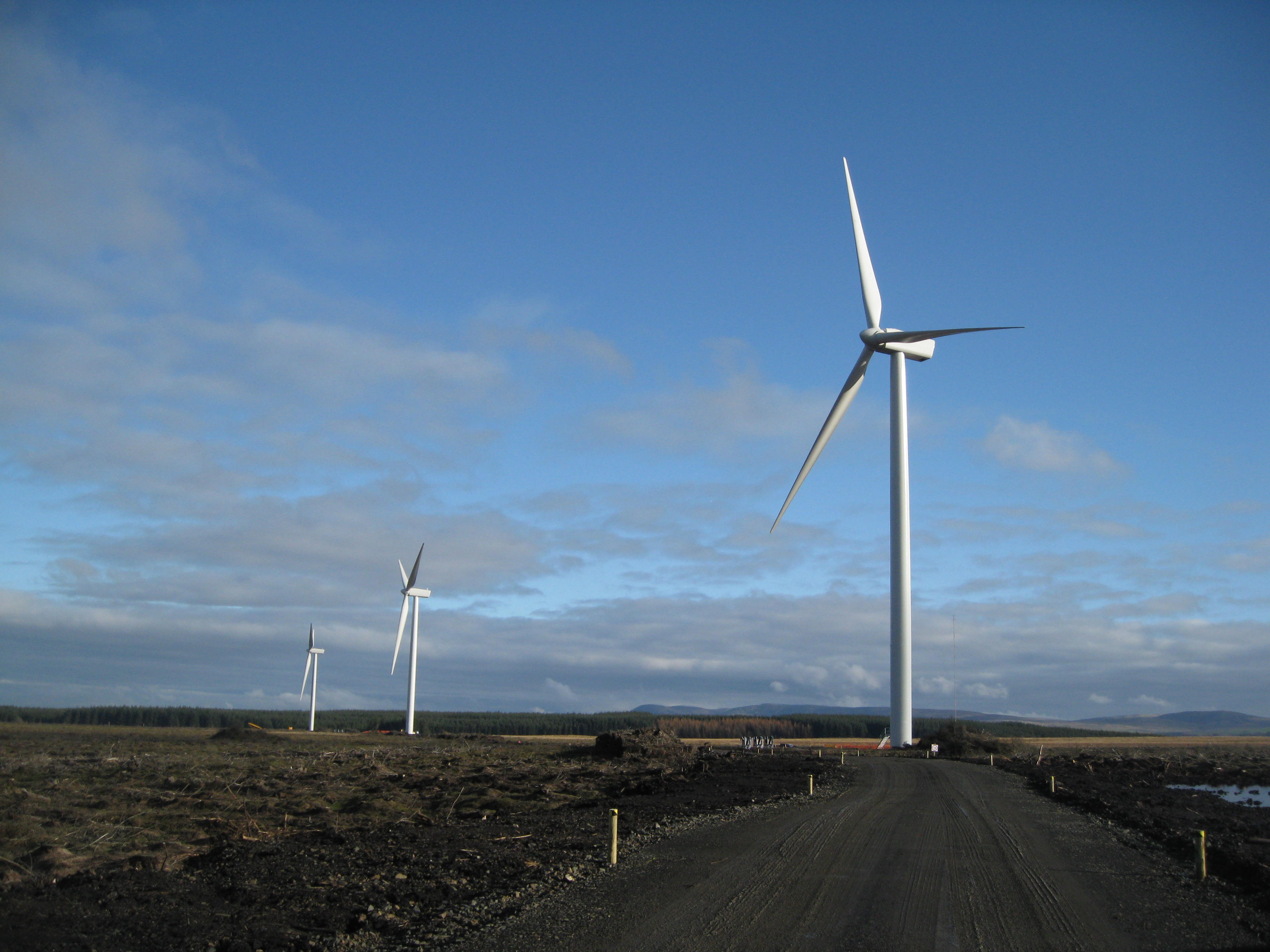
- Pates Hill Wind Farm during Construction
- Location of Pates Hill Wind Farm in Scotland
- Country: United Kingdom, Scotland
- Location: near West Calder, West Lothian
- Coordinates: 55°48′32″N 3°35′57″W
- Status: Operational
- Commission date: January 2010
- Owner: Pates Hill Wind Energy Limited
- Operator: Entap Limited

Power generation
- Units operational: 7
- Make and model: Vestas: V80-2.0MW
- Nameplate capacity: 14 MW

External links
- Commons: Related media on Commons

Pates Hill Wind Farm is located near the village of West Calder in West Lothian, Scotland. It consists of 7 Vestas V-80 wind turbines, measuring 107 metres to the blade tip. It became operational in February 2010 and is expected to generate electricity equivalent to the needs of approximately 8,000 households annually.

The wind farm is managed by Engineering Renewables Limited on behalf of Pates Hill Wind Energy Limited.

The West Lothian Council granted planning permission in June 2007 for a 25-year period. The balance of plant contract for the civil and electrical works was awarded to Lagan Construction Limited. Windhoist were contracted to erect the turbines

Construction started in February 2009 and was completed on schedule in February 2010. Vestas is the largest wind turbine manufacturer in the world, based in Denmark. Each turbine is 2 MW, giving the wind farm total installed capacity of 14 MW.

The wind farm will contribute £70,000 each year to the local community for energy efficiency initiatives over the 25 years, totaling £1.75 million.

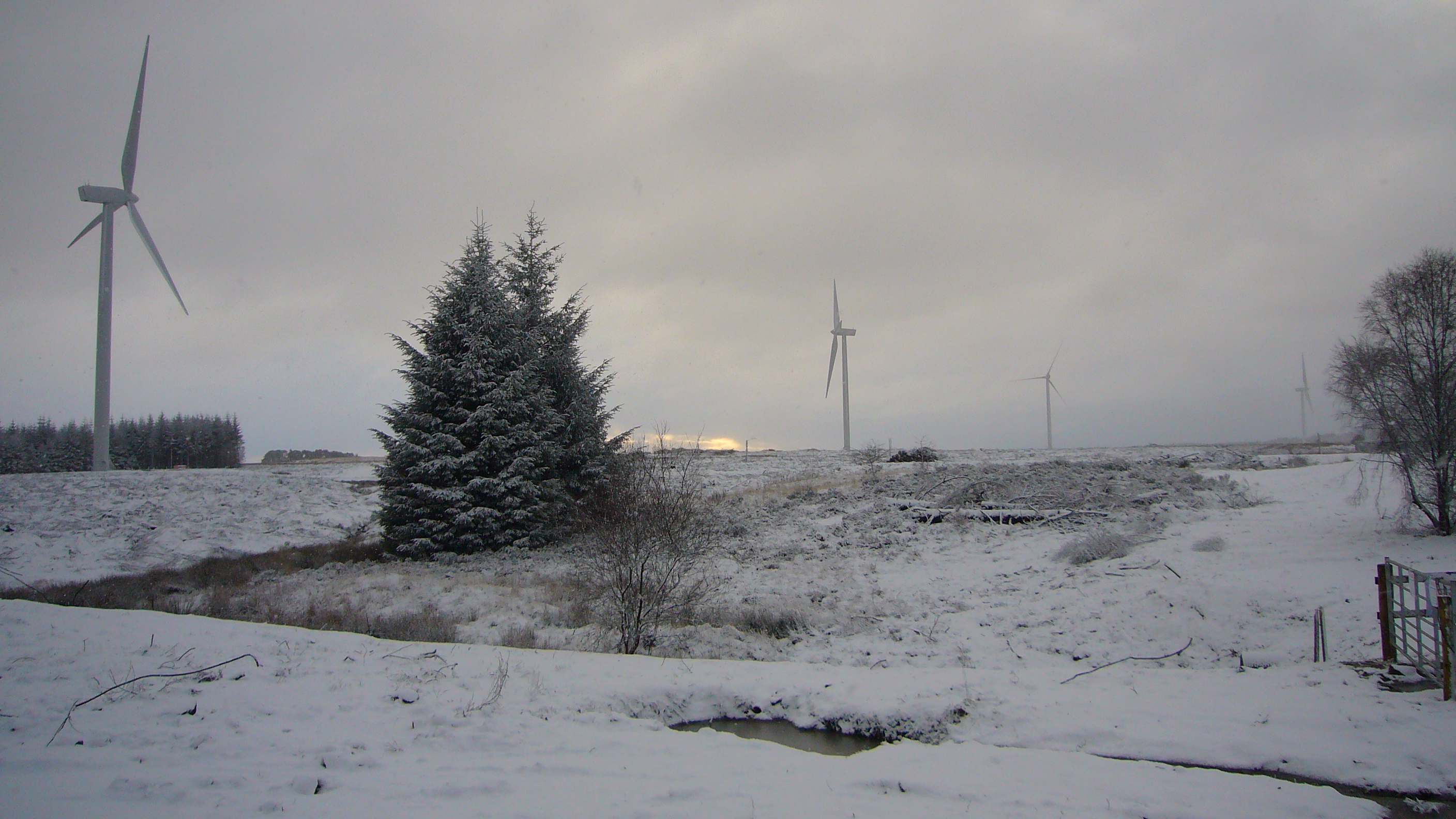
Pates Hill Wind Farm, January 2010
