= Thomas Brown (prison architect) =

Scottish architect (1806–1872)

Thomas Brown (12 April 1806 – 23 August 1872) was a Scottish architect operating throughout Scotland in the mid-19th century, primarily involved with prison design. Despite training under Thomas Brown Senior he was not related to him.

== Life ==
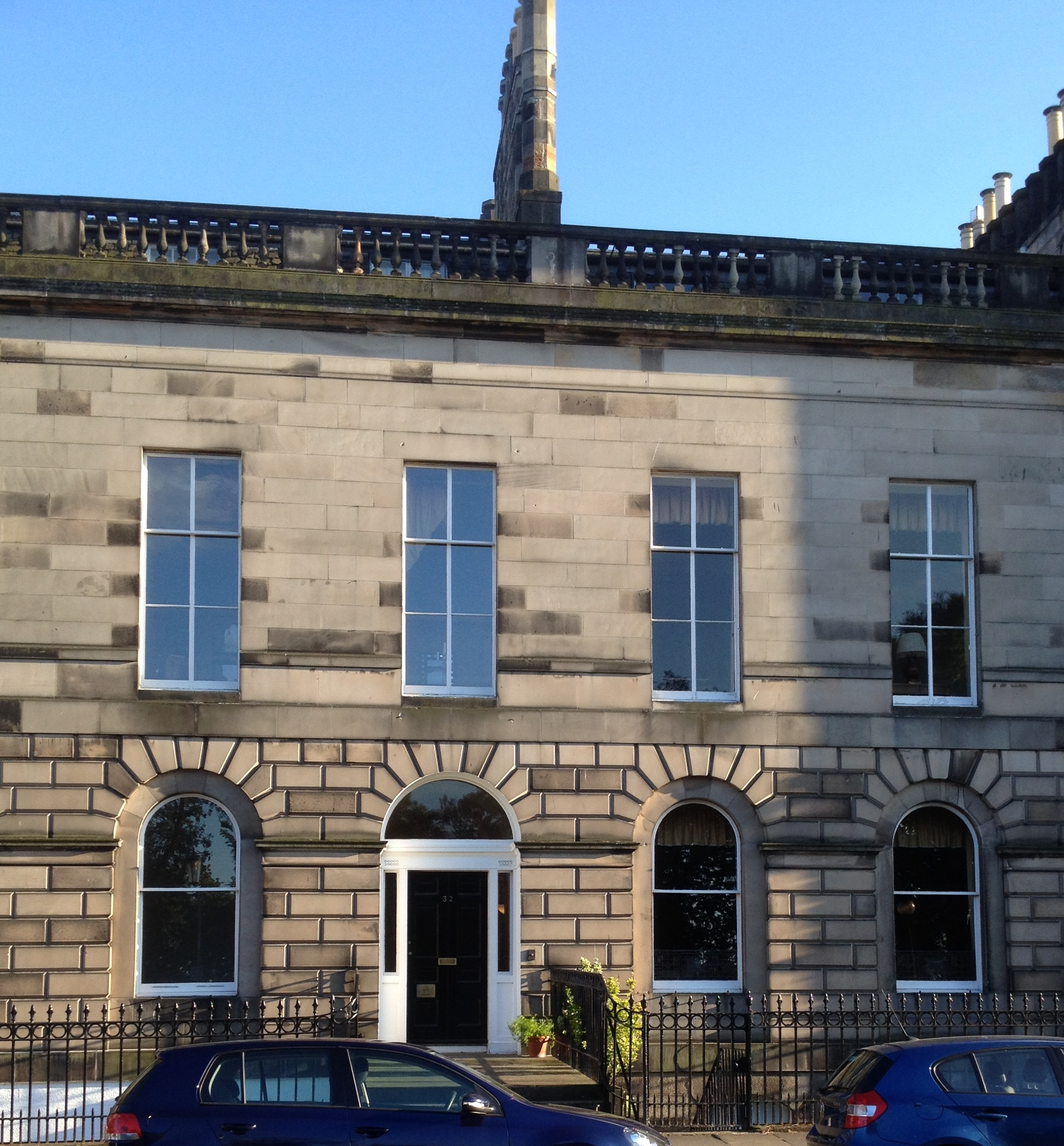
32 Royal Terrace, Edinburgh

Thomas was the third son of Thomas Brown an architect/builder in Uphall, just south of Edinburgh and Janet Neil.

Thomas trained first under Thomas Brown and then under William Burn in Edinburgh, and his early work show much stylistic influence from Burn. In 1837 he received a very prestigious appointment as architect to the Prison Board of Scotland, a newly formed board tasked with replacing many ancient and ruinous tolbooths and prisons with new and generally larger facilities, partly inspired by the hugely successful prison for Napoleonic prisoners of war at Perth, which was quickly converted to standard prison use after that war, and was held as an exemplar. He had a prestigious office at 3 North Charlotte Street, just off Charlotte Square.

The production of prisons in the 1840s was huge, each working to a reasonably simple formula in design terms.

In 1849 he entered into partnership with James Maitland Wardrop to create Brown & Wardrop who thereafter practiced from 19 St Andrew Square.

In the same year Brown married Helen Neill, and they lived at 27 Royal Terrace on Calton Hill. They had one daughter, Janetta, who died aged six.

Brown died at 32 Royal Terrace. Thereafter the practice took Charles Reid as a partner and became known as Wardrop & Reid.

== Works ==
see

- Church and Session House, Temple, Midlothian (1830)
- St. Nicholas Parish Church, Uphall, West Lothian (1832)
- Elgin Prison, Morayshire (1839)
- Debtor’s Prison, Calton, Edinburgh (1841) demolished
- New front, Luffness Castle, East Lothian (1841)
- Stonehaven Prison, Kincardineshire (1841)
- Dingwall Prison and Courthouse (1842)
- Dornoch Prison, Sutherland (1842)
- Dunfermline Prison (1843)
- Stornoway Sheriff Court and Prison, Ross and Cromarty (1843)
- Tain Courthouse and Prison, Ross and Cromarty (1843)
- Berwick Courthouse and Prison, Berwick-upon-Tweed (1844)
- Cromarty Courthouse (1844)
- Inveraray Courthouse and Prison (1844) (now a fully preserved “living museum”)
- Rebuilding of Kilberry Castle to create Kilberry House (1844)
- Peebles Courthouse and Prison (1844)
- Ayr Prison (1845) (altering existing prison)
- Campbeltown Prison (1845)
- Ingliston House (1846)
- Inverness Prison (1846)
- Dornoch Sheriff Court (1850)
- Wigtown County Buildings (1862)
- County Buildings, Alloa (1863)
- Linlithgow Sheriff Court (1863)
- Stirling Sheriff Court (1864)
- Falkirk Sheriff Court (1868)
- Stranraer Sheriff Court (1872)
