= West Lothian Civic Centre =

Judicial building in Livingston, Scotland

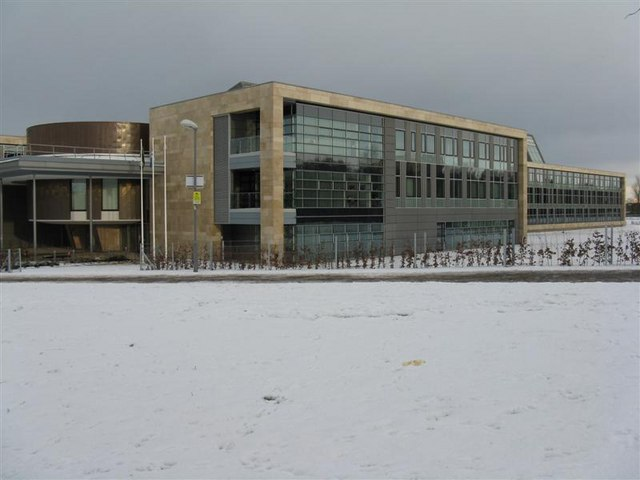
- The building in 2009

- Shown in West Lothian
- 55.8871°N 3.5158°W
- Location: Howden South Road, Livingston

History
- Built: 2009

Site notes
- Architect: BDP
- Architectural style: Modern style

West Lothian Civic Centre is a municipal building on Howden South Road in Livingston, West Lothian in Scotland. The building serves as the offices and meeting place of West Lothian Council as well as the venue for hearings of Livingston Sheriff Court.

== History ==
Until the early 21st century, West Lothian Council was based at County Buildings in Linlithgow, which had been built as the headquarters for the old West Lothian County Council in 1935. However, the council also owned Lindsay House on South Bridge Street, Bathgate, which had been built as the Burgh Chambers for the old Bathgate Town Council in 1966, and West Lothian House on Almondvale Boulevard in Livingston, which had been built as the headquarters of the Livingston Development Corporation in 1981. The council wanted to consolidate its activities at one location: the site it selected was just north of Livingston town centre on the bank of the River Almond.

The building was designed by BDP in the Modern style, built by Laing O'Rourke with a steel frame and limestone cladding at a cost of £53 million, and was completed in July 2009. It was officially opened by First Minister, Alex Salmond, on 25 November 2009.

The design involved an asymmetrical main frontage facing west onto Hochsauerland Brae. The layout involved three main sections: a clearly visible circular council chamber, and offices for council officers and their staff, to the south, a divisional headquarters for Police Scotland to the centre, and six courtrooms for Livingston Sheriff Court as well as offices for the procurator fiscal and the Scottish Children's Reporter Administration to the north.

Linlithgow Sheriff Court, which the complex also replaced, closed in August 2009. Lindsay House and West Lothian House were both demolished shortly after the new Civic Centre opened.

In November 2025, the site was subjected to a firebombing attack with minimal damage caused.
