= County Buildings, Linlithgow =

County building in Linlithgow, Scotland

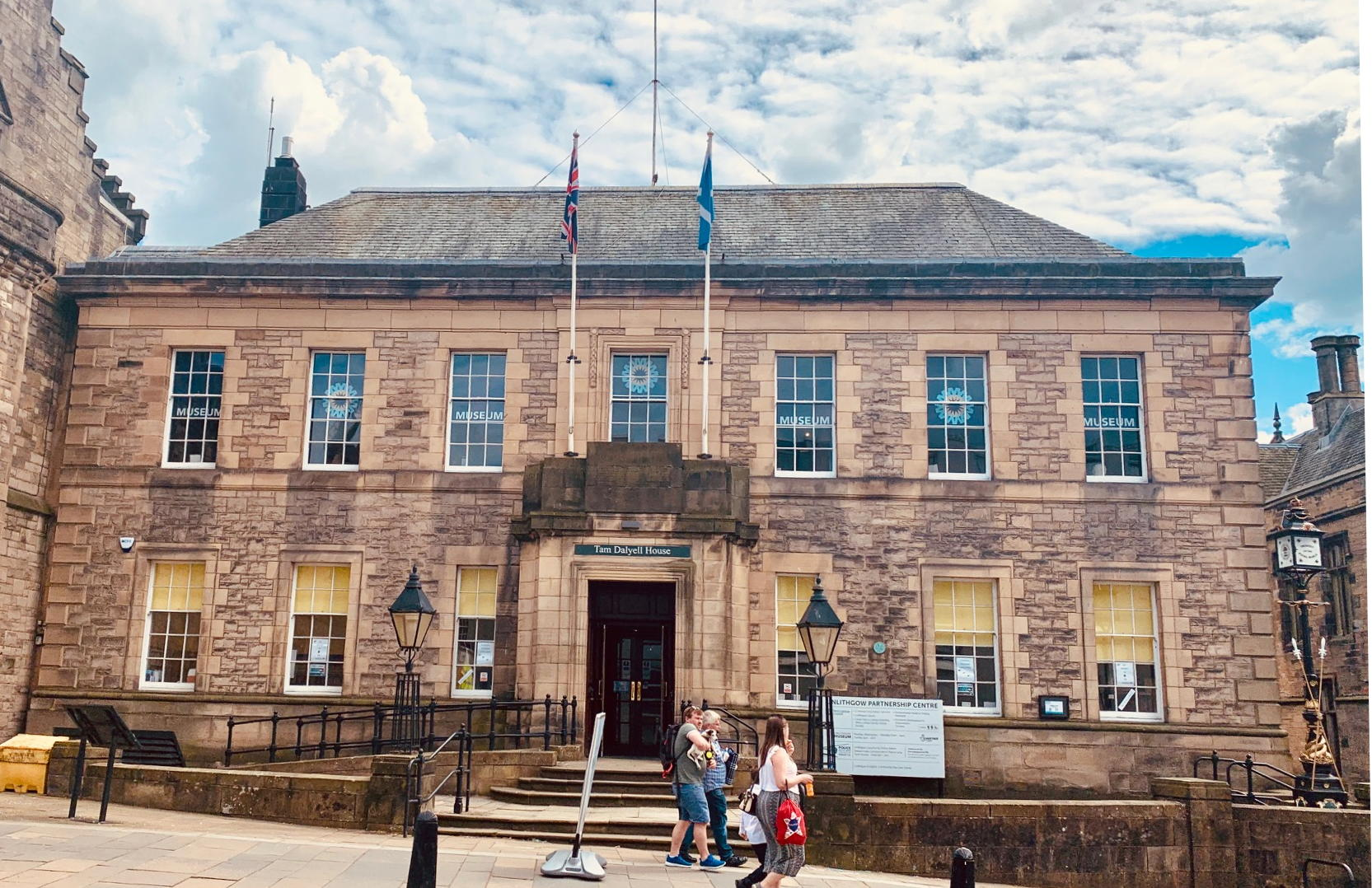
- County Buildings, Linlithgow

- Shown in West Lothian
- 55.9767°N 3.6009°W
- Location: High Street, Linlithgow

History
- Built: 1935

Site notes
- Architect: Dick Peddie & Walker Todd
- Architectural style: Neo-Georgian style

Listed Building – Category B
- Official name: High Street, County Buildings with screen wall lamp standards and Provost's lamp
- Designated: 16 March 1992
- Reference no.: LB37399

The County Buildings are in the High Street, Linlithgow, Scotland. The complex, which was the headquarters of West Lothian County Council, is a Category B listed building.

== History ==
Following the implementation of the Local Government (Scotland) Act 1889 which established a uniform system of county councils in Scotland, the new West Lothian County Council established its headquarters in the northern wing of the complex now known as the Linlithgow Burgh Halls. As the administration of the county grew, the county leaders decided to commission a dedicated county hall: the site they selected, just to the west of Linlithgow Sheriff Court, was occupied by a residential property known as Templars' Tenements.

Construction of the new building commenced in 1935. It was designed by Walker Todd of Dick Peddie & Walker Todd in the Neo-Georgian style, built in ashlar stone and was opened in 1940. The design involved a symmetrical main frontage with seven bays facing onto the High Street; the central bay featured, on the ground floor, an architraved doorway surmounted by blocking course and a blind panel and, on the first floor, an architraved sash window surrounded by carvings depicting garlands of bay leafs. The other bays were fenestrated by sash windows.

Following the abolition of West Lothian County Council in 1975, the complex passed to the new West Lothian District Council, which chose to use the former Burgh Chambers of Bathgate Town Council (built in 1966) as its headquarters, extending the building in 1976 and renaming it Lindsay House. The district council retained the county buildings in Linlithgow as additional office space. In November 2009, the new unitary authority, West Lothian Council, centralised its services at the new West Lothian Civic Centre in Livingston and much of the space in the county buildings in Linlithgow fell vacant.

A major programme of refurbishment works at the county buildings, which was undertaken by Maxi Construction at a cost of £4 million, commenced in May 2016. The works created new premises for the Linlithgow Library, the Local History Library and the Council Information Services, as well as meeting rooms for the Family History Society, Linlithgow Heritage Trust and the Linlithgow & District Community Day Care Centre. The complex was renamed the "Linlithgow Partnership Centre – Tam Dalyell House" to commemorate the life of the former local member of parliament, Tam Dalyell, and was officially reopened by the Leader of West Lothian Council, Lawrence Fitzpatrick, and Dalyell's widow, Kathleen Dalyell, in January 2018. An annexe, attached to the eastern gable of the building, was sold to developer for hotel use in May 2019. The Linlithgow Museum relocated from Annet House to the main county buildings complex later in the year.

Works of art in the county buildings include a portrait by Henry Raeburn of John Hope, 4th Earl of Hopetoun, a portrait by Robert Brough of John Hope, 7th Earl of Hopetoun and a portrait by John Watson Gordon of General Sir Alexander Hope as well as a portrait by Victoria Crowe of Tam Dalyell.

== See also ==
- List of listed buildings in Linlithgow, West Lothian
