= Wilkieston =

Village in West Lothian, Scotland

Coordinates: 55.9015°N 3.4071°W

Wilkieston: Scots: Wilkiestoun
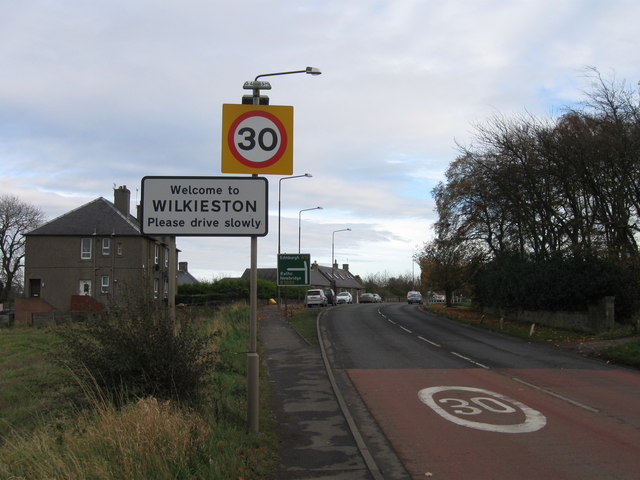
- The road into Wilkieston

- Location within West Lothian
- Population: 147
- OS grid reference: NT122685
- Civil parish: Kirknewton
- Council area: West Lothian
- Lieutenancy area: West Lothian
- Country: Scotland
- Sovereign state: United Kingdom
- Post town: KIRKNEWTON
- Postcode district: EH27
- Dialling code: 01506
- Police: Scotland
- Fire: Scottish
- Ambulance: Scottish
- UK Parliament: Livingston
- Scottish Parliament: Almond Valley

Wilkieston is a small village in West Lothian, Scotland. It is located on the A71 road, 0.93 miles (1.5 km) north of Kirknewton, 1.2 miles (2 km) south-west of Ratho and 6.2 miles (10 km) east of Livingston.

To the north-west of the village is Bonnington House, a 19th-century country house.

To the north-east of the village are the remains of Hatton House, medieval home of the Lauder family, which was demolished in 1955.

Linburn Park was a country house and estate in Wilkeston, located to the south of the village that was demolished in 1955. The estate is now home to the Linburn Centre, which is run by charity Scottish War Blinded. The centre provides assistance to adults who have been members of the armed forces and now have a visual impairment.

Military Museum Scotland is a military history museum in Wilkieston that covers Scottish military history from the First World War to the present day.
