= Linburn Centre =

- Scottish War Blinded
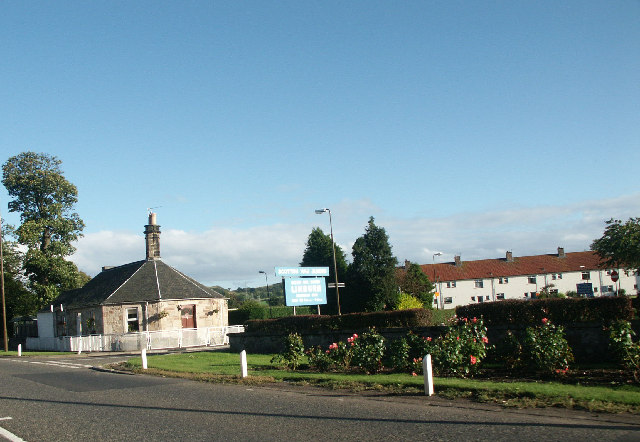
- Main entrance

- Shown in West Lothian

Geography
- Location: Wilkieston, West Lothian, Scotland, United Kingdom
- Coordinates: 55.900°N 3.407°W

Organisation
- Care system: Private
- Type: Specialist

Services
- Speciality: Blind people

History
- Founded: 1944

Links
- Lists: Hospitals in Scotland

The Linburn Centre is a day centre for blinded war veterans at Wilkieston in West Lothian, Scotland, around 6 kilometres (3.7 mi) west of the city of Edinburgh. The centre is located within the estate of Linburn House, a country house which was demolished in 1955. It is operated by the charity Scottish War Blinded.

== History ==
The Scottish National Institution for the War Blinded was established in 1915 to care for servicemen blinded in the First World War. The Institution purchased the Linburn estate in 1944 and developed housing, workshops and recreational facilities within the grounds of the house. Linburn House itself was used as a hospital before being demolished in 1955. 16 purpose-built homes were constructed for blinded veterans and their families.

In 2002 the hostel at Linburn, which provided nursing accommodation for blind veterans, was closed and the residents re-housed. In 2009 it was announced that a new centre would be built and that the design of the centre, by Page\Park Architects, had been inspired by a Chinese dragon on display in the old building. The new building was officially opened by the Duke of Gloucester in June 2011.

== Services ==
The centre incorporates a wide range of facilities to equip members with the skills and opportunities they require to maintain and improve the quality of their life. It is a center of activity and socialisation for members within the local area, but is also ideal for occasional short course use for members from further afield.

== See also ==
- Royal Blind School
