= Linlithgow Sheriff Court =

Judicial building in Linlithgow, Scotland

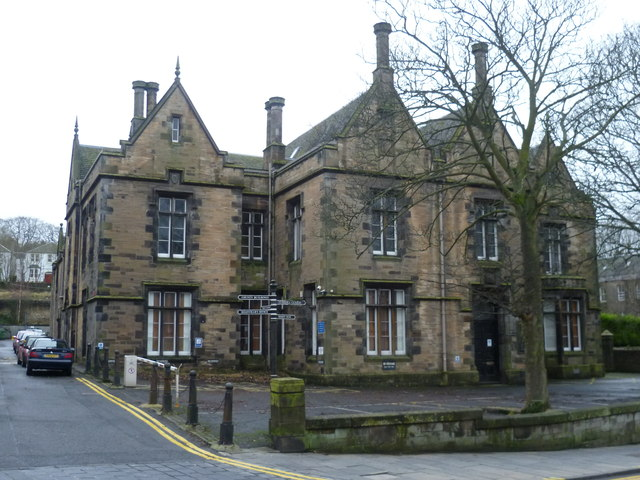
- The building in 2011

- Shown in West Lothian
- 55.9765°N 3.6014°W
- Location: High Street, Linlithgow

History
- Built: 1863

Site notes
- Architect(s): Thomas Brown II and James Maitland Wardrop
- Architectural style: Tudor Revival style

Listed Building – Category B
- Official name: The Court Residence (Former Linlithgow Sheriff Court), including boundary walls and gatepiers, 1 Court Square, High Street, Linlithgow
- Designated: 17 October 1989
- Reference no.: LB37400

Linlithgow Sheriff Court is a former judicial building on the High Street in Linlithgow in Scotland. The building, which has been converted for residential use, is a Category B listed building.

== History ==
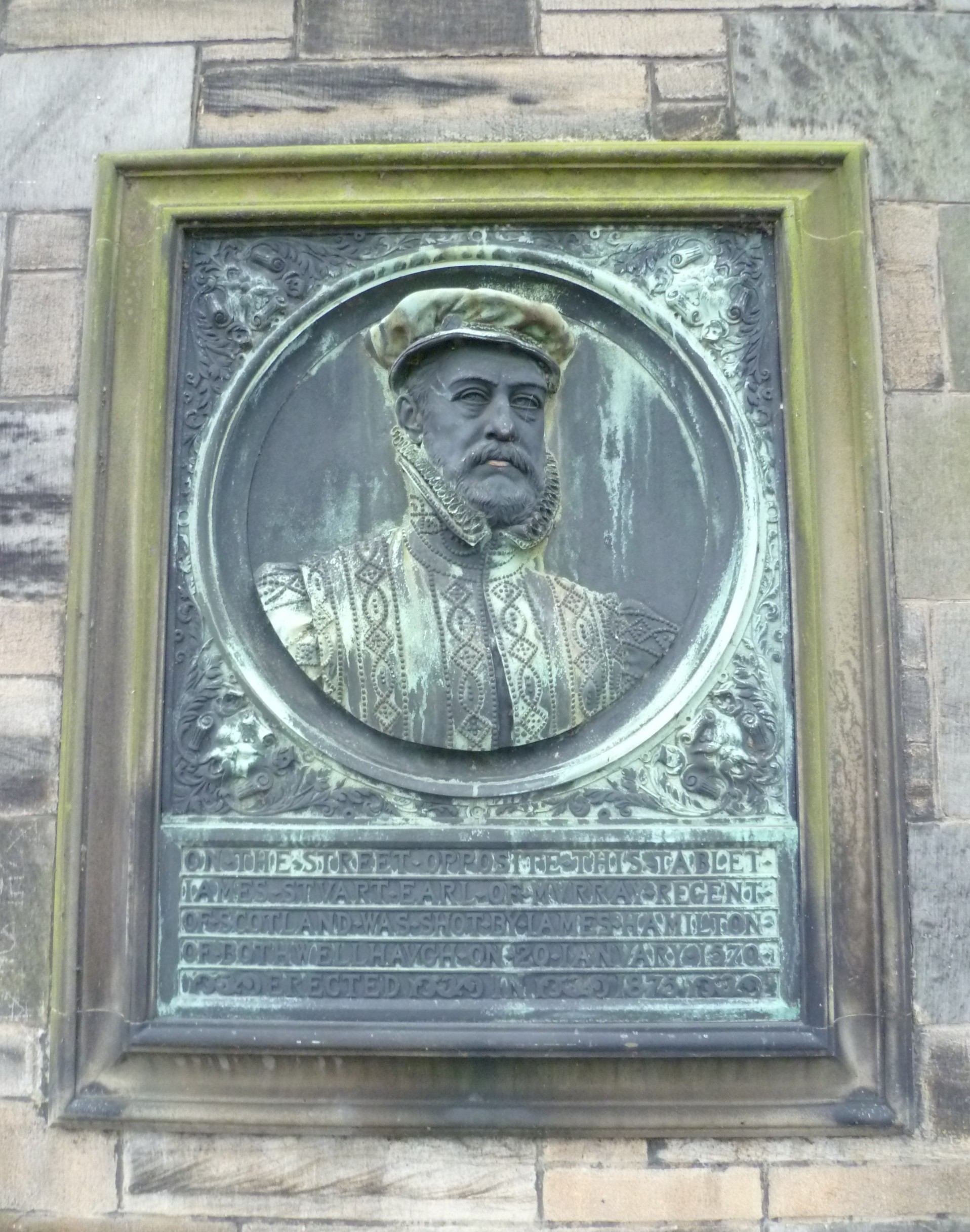
Plaque on the front of the building

Until the mid-19th century, court hearings were held in the old town house in Linlithgow. After finding this arrangement unsatisfactory, court officials decided to commission a dedicated courthouse: the site they selected, on the south side of the High Street, had been occupied by Archbishop John Hamilton's house in the 16th century. The new building was designed by Thomas Brown II and James Maitland Wardrop in the Tudor Revival style, built in rubble masonry and was completed in 1863.

The design involved an asymmetrical main frontage of six bays facing onto the High Street. The windows were all mullioned and transomed. The first and last bays were gabled, with lancet windows in the gables, and finials at the apex of the gables. The second and fifth bays were narrow connecting bays with bipartite windows on both floors, and the third and fourth bays were projected forward, gabled and featured tall chimney stacks. The first and third bays were fenestrated with tri-partite windows on the ground floor and bipartite windows on the first floor, while the fourth bay featured an arched doorway with a hood mould on the ground floor and a bipartite window on the first floor. The last bay was fenestrated by a bay window on the ground floor and a bipartite window on the first floor. Internally, the principal rooms were the main courtroom, with a timber boarded ceiling, on the first floor, and the record room, with a triple vaulted ceiling, on the ground floor.

In 1875, a plaque was erected on the front of the building, to the right of the doorway, to record the assassination of the Regent of Scotland, James Stewart, 1st Earl of Moray, by James Hamilton on the site in 1570.

After the new Livingston Sheriff Court at West Lothian Civic Centre was completed in July 2009, Linlithgow Sheriff Court closed in August 2009. The courthouse was subsequently acquired by a developer and converted into 21 short-term accommodation suites.

== See also ==
- List of listed buildings in Linlithgow, West Lothian
