= West Lothian Council =

Local authority for West Lothian, Scotland

West Lothian Council Comhairle Lodainn an Iar
- Coat of Arms

- West Lothian Council logo

Type
- Type: Unitary authority

History
- Preceded by: West Lothian District Council (1975-1996)

Leadership
- Provost: Cathy Muldoon, Labour since 24 May 2022
- Leader: Lawrence Fitzpatrick, Labour since 25 May 2017
- Chief Executive: Graham Hope since September 2010

Structure
- Seats: 33 councillors
- Political groups: Administration (11) Labour (11) Other parties (22) SNP (14) Conservative (4) Reform (1) Liberal Democrats (1) Independent (2)

Elections
- Voting system: Single transferable vote
- Last election: 5 May 2022
- Next election: 6 May 2027

Meeting place
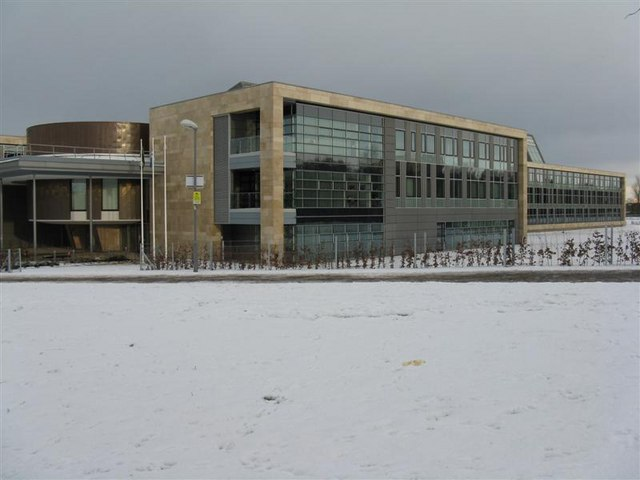
- West Lothian Civic Centre, Howden South Road, Livingston, EH54 6FF

Website
- www.westlothian.gov.uk

West Lothian Council (Scottish Gaelic: Comhairle Lodainn an Iar) is the local government authority for West Lothian council area.

== History ==
=== West Lothian District Council ===
Local government across Scotland was reorganised in 1975 under the Local Government (Scotland) Act 1973, which replaced the counties and burghs with a two-tier structure of upper-tier regions and lower-tier districts. West Lothian became a district within the Lothian region. Under that system, the authority was named West Lothian District Council. West Lothian district took its name from the historic county of West Lothian, which had covered a similar but not identical area.

=== West Lothian Council ===
Local government was reorganised again in 1996 under the Local Government etc. (Scotland) Act 1994, which abolished the regions and districts created in 1975 and established 32 single-tier council areas across Scotland, one being West Lothian.

In 2025, parts of the council were affected by a significant cyber attack.

== Political control ==
The council has been under no overall control since 2007, with a Labour leader since 2012.

The first election to West Lothian District Council was held in 1974, initially operating as a shadow authority alongside the outgoing authorities until the new system came into force on 16 May 1975. A shadow authority was again elected in 1995 ahead of the reforms which came into force on 1 April 1996. Political control of the council since 1975 has been as follows:

West Lothian District Council

| Party in control | Years |
|---|---|
| Labour | 1975–1977 |
| No overall control | 1977–1980 |
| Labour | 1980–1992 |
| No overall control | 1992–1996 |

West Lothian Council

| Party in control | Years |
|---|---|
| Labour | 1996–2007 |
| No overall control | 2007– |

=== Leadership ===
The role of provost is largely ceremonial in West Lothian. Political leadership is provided by the leader of the council. The leaders since 1996 have been:

| Councillor | Party | From | To |
|---|---|---|---|
| Graeme Morrice | Labour | 1 April 1996 | May 2007 |
| Peter Johnston | SNP | 10 May 2007 | May 2012 |
| John McGinty | Labour | 10 May 2012 | May 2017 |
| Lawrence Fitzpatrick | Labour | 25 May 2017 | |

=== Composition ===
Following the 2022 election and subsequent by-elections and changes of allegiance up to July 2026, the composition of the council was:

| Party | Seats |
|---|---|
| Labour | 11 |
| SNP | 14 |
| Conservative | 4 |
| Reform | 1 |
| Liberal Democrats | 1 |
| Independent | 2 |
| Total | 33 |

The next full council election is due in 2027.

== Elections ==
Since 2007 elections have been held every five years under the single transferable vote system, introduced by the Local Governance (Scotland) Act 2004. Election results since 1995 have been as follows:

| Year | Seats | SNP | Labour | Conservative | Liberal Democrats | Independent / Other | Notes |
|---|---|---|---|---|---|---|---|
| 1995 | 27 | 11 | 15 | 1 | 0 | 0 | Labour majority |
| 1999 | 32 | 11 | 20 | 1 | 0 | 0 | New ward boundaries. Labour majority |
| 2003 | 32 | 12 | 18 | 1 | 0 | 1 | Labour majority |
| 2007 | 32 | 13 | 14 | 1 | 0 | 4 | New ward boundaries. SNP-Conservative-Action to Save St. John's Hospital |
| 2012 | 33 | 15 | 16 | 1 | 0 | 1 | Increase in number of councillors. Labour minority. |
| 2017 | 33 | 13 | 12 | 7 | 0 | 1 | Labour minority with Conservative support. |
| 2022 | 33 | 15 | 12 | 4 | 1 | 1 | Labour minority with Conservative-Independent-Liberal Democrat support. |

== Premises ==
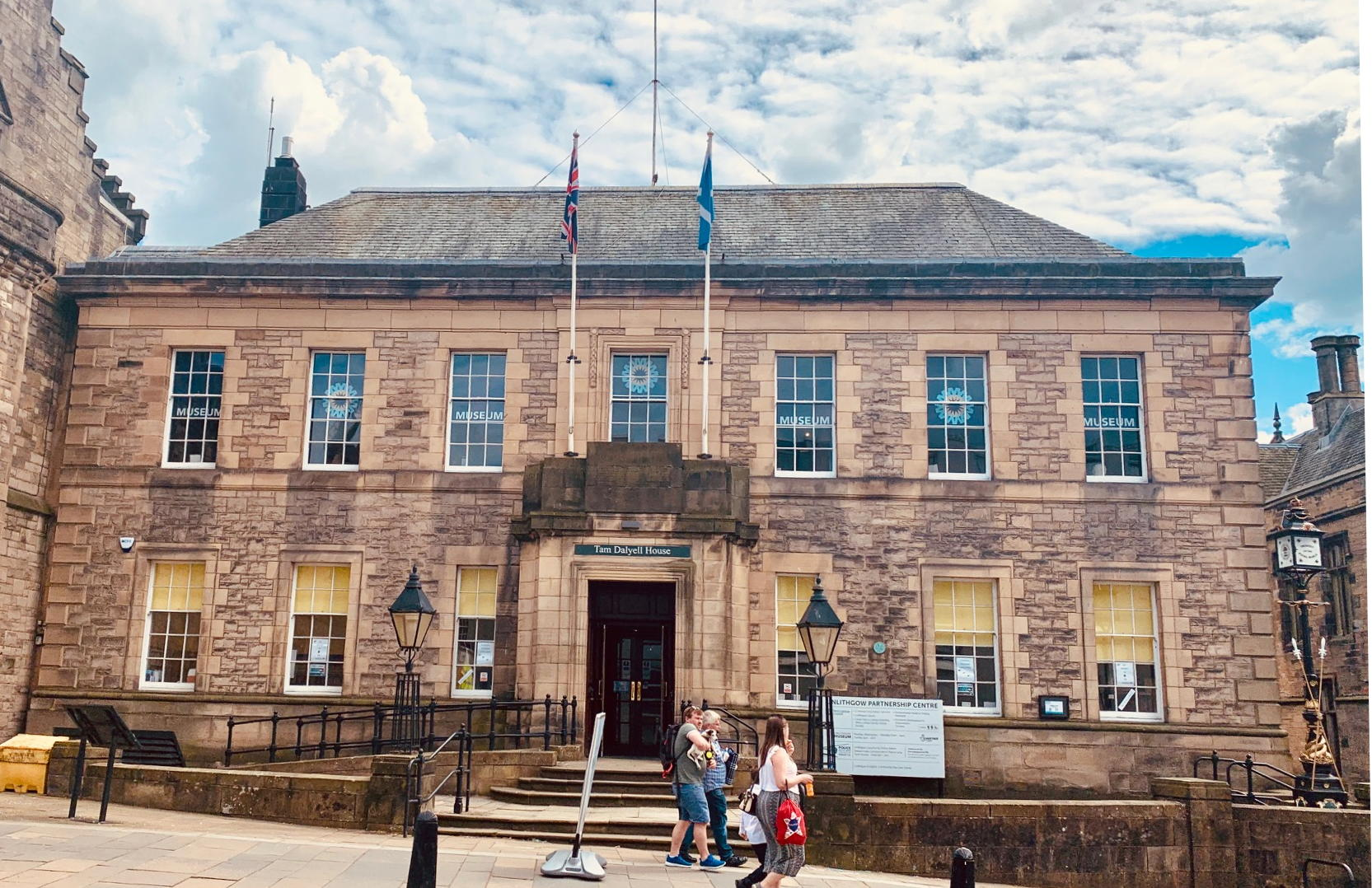
Former County Buildings, Linlithgow: One of the council's former offices

The council is based at the West Lothian Civic Centre in Livingston. The building was built in 2009 at a cost of £50 million to serve as a police headquarters and courthouse as well as offices for the council. Prior to 2009 the council's offices had been divided between various buildings, including:

- County Buildings in Linlithgow, which had been built in 1935 as the headquarters for the old West Lothian County Council.
- Lindsay House on South Bridge Street, Bathgate, built in 1966 as the Burgh Chambers for the old Bathgate Town Council.
- West Lothian House on Almondvale Boulevard in Livingston, which had been built in 1981 as Sidlaw House and had been the headquarters of the Livingston Development Corporation.

Lindsay House and West Lothian House were both demolished shortly after the new Civic Centre opened in 2009.

== Services ==
Like all Scottish Councils, West Lothian Council provides services such as Education, Social Work, Housing, Highways, Street lighting and Cleansing.

The council is responsible for the co-ordination of the planning and provision of public services in West Lothian. It works closely with other public bodies such as police, fire and health, through its community planning partnership.

West Lothian Council operates country parks at Beecraigs, Polkemmet, and Almondell & Calderwood.

== Wards ==
Map of the area's wards (2007 to 2017 configuration)

During elections West Lothian Council is divided geographically into 9 wards which then elect either three or four councillors each by the Single Transferable Vote system. The electoral system of local councils in Scotland is governed by the Local Governance (Scotland) Act 2004, an Act of the Scottish Parliament which first introduced proportional representation to councils. These electoral wards are as follows:

West Lothian Council Wards
| Ward Number | Ward Name | Location | Elected Members |
|---|---|---|---|
| 1 | Linlithgow | | 3 |
| 2 | Broxburn, Uphall and Winchburgh | | 4 |
| 3 | Livingston North | | 4 |
| 4 | Livingston South | | 4 |
| 5 | East Livingston and East Calder | | 4 |
| 6 | Fauldhouse and the Breich Valley | | 3 |
| 7 | Whitburn and Blackburn | | 4 |
| 8 | Bathgate | | 4 |
| 9 | Armadale and Blackridge | | 3 |
