= West Lothian =

Council area of Scotland

West Lothian: Lodainn an Iar (Scottish Gaelic); Wast Lowden (Scots)
- Lieutenancy and council area
- Coat of arms

- West Lothian shown within Scotland
- Coordinates: 55°55′N 3°30′W
- Sovereign state: United Kingdom
- Country: Scotland
- Unitary authority: 1 April 1996
- Administrative HQ: West Lothian Civic Centre

Government
  - Type: Council
  - Body: West Lothian Council
  - Control: No overall control
  - MPs: 2 MPs: Kirsteen Sullivan (L); Gregor Poynton (L)
  - MSPs: 2 MSPs: Angela Constance (SNP); Fiona Hyslop (SNP)

Area
  - Total: 165 sq mi (428 km^{2})
  - Rank: 20th

Population (2025)
  - Total: 187,240
  - Rank: 10th
  - Density: 1,130/sq mi (438/km^{2})
- Time zone: UTC+0 (GMT)
  - Summer (DST): UTC+1 (BST)
- ISO 3166 code: GB-WLN
- GSS code: S12000040
- Website: westlothian.gov.uk

West Lothian (Scots: Wast Lowden; Scottish Gaelic: Lodainn an Iar) is one of the 32 council areas of Scotland, bordering (in a clockwise direction) the City of Edinburgh council area, Scottish Borders, South Lanarkshire, North Lanarkshire and Falkirk. The modern council area was formed in 1975 when the historic county of West Lothian, also known as Linlithgowshire, was reshaped substantially as part of local government reforms; some areas that had formerly been part of Midlothian were added to a new West Lothian District within the Region of Lothian, whilst some areas in the north-west were transferred to the Falkirk District and areas in the north-east were transferred to the City of Edinburgh District. In 1996 West Lothian became a unitary authority area, using the same name and territory as in 1975.

West Lothian lies on the southern shore of the Firth of Forth and is predominantly rural, though there were extensive coal, iron, and shale oil mining operations in the 19th and 20th centuries which created distinctive red-spoil heaps (locally known as "bings") throughout the council area. The old county town was the royal burgh of Linlithgow, but the largest town (and the second-largest town in the Lothian region after Edinburgh) is now Livingston, where West Lothian Council has been based since 2009 having previously used facilities across three sites. Other large towns in the county include Bathgate (a town with medieval origins that developed extensively during the industrial revolution) and the historic mining settlements of Armadale, Fauldhouse, Whitburn, West Calder, Uphall, and Broxburn.

== History ==
In 1975, as a result of the Local Government (Scotland) Act 1973, the boundaries of West Lothian were adjusted: the 1973 Act abolished the traditional counties and burghs, instead creating a system of Regions and Districts. West Lothian was made a district of Lothian Region but lost the burgh of Bo'ness and the district of Bo'ness to Falkirk District of Central Region, and the burgh of Queensferry and the district of Kirkliston plus part of Winchburgh to the Edinburgh district of Lothian Region. It gained East Calder and West Calder districts from Midlothian. The two-tier system was abolished by the Local Government etc. (Scotland) Act 1994, and the district of West Lothian was made into a unitary council area named West Lothian Council.

== Government and politics ==
=== Council ===
West Lothian Council is the local authority for the West Lothian area and has 33 elected members. Councillors are generally elected every five years, with the next election falling in Spring 2027.

The current council composition is:

Party	Councillors
Scottish National Party	15
Labour	11
Conservative	4
Liberal Democrats	1
Independent	2

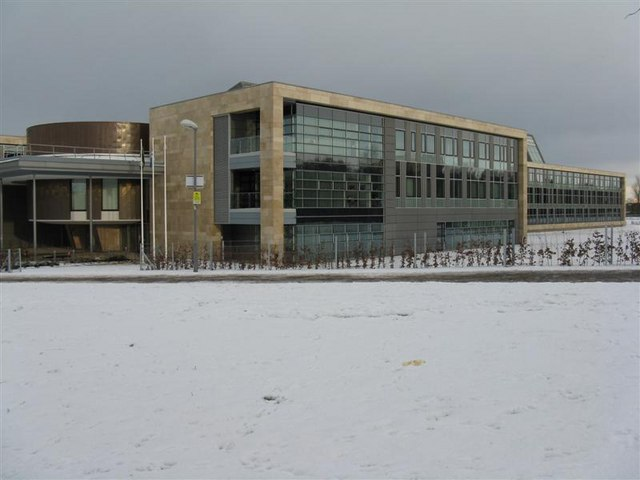
West Lothian Civic Centre

Following the abolition of West Lothian County Council in 1975, the new West Lothian District Council chose to use the former Burgh Chambers of Bathgate Town Council (built in 1966) as its headquarters, extending the building in 1976 and renaming it Lindsay House. The district council retained the county buildings in Linlithgow as additional office space. In November 2009, the new unitary authority, West Lothian Council, centralised its services at the new West Lothian Civic Centre in Livingston.

=== Parliamentary representation ===
West Lothian is represented in the Scottish Parliament by two constituency members and seven regional members of the Scottish Parliament (MSPs).

In the Parliament of the United Kingdom West Lothian is represented by two members of Parliament. Labour Party Member of Parliament (MP) Gregor Poynton represents the Livingston constituency. Kirsteen Sullivan represents the Bathgate and Linlithgow (UK Parliament constituency) Until 2024, the area included the Linlithgow and East Falkirk (UK Parliament constituency).

The West Lothian question, referring to whether Scottish, Welsh, and Northern Irish MPs should be allowed to vote on English laws, is so named because it was supposedly first raised by Tam Dalyell while he was MP for West Lothian.

== Settlements ==
The largest settlements in West Lothian

The creation of the modern council area in 1975 drastically altered West Lothian's boundaries. Significant towns not included in the modern county are the coastal burghs of Bo'ness and Queensferry and the inland town of Kirkliston. Large parts of the southern urban area of Livingston which were historically within Midlothian were, however, transferred to West Lothian.

Largest settlements by population:

Settlement	Population (2020)
Livingston	56,840
Bathgate	23,600
Broxburn	15,970
Linlithgow	12,840
Armadale	12,720
Whitburn	11,490
East Calder	6,430
Blackburn	5,730
Fauldhouse	4,900
Winchburgh	3,840

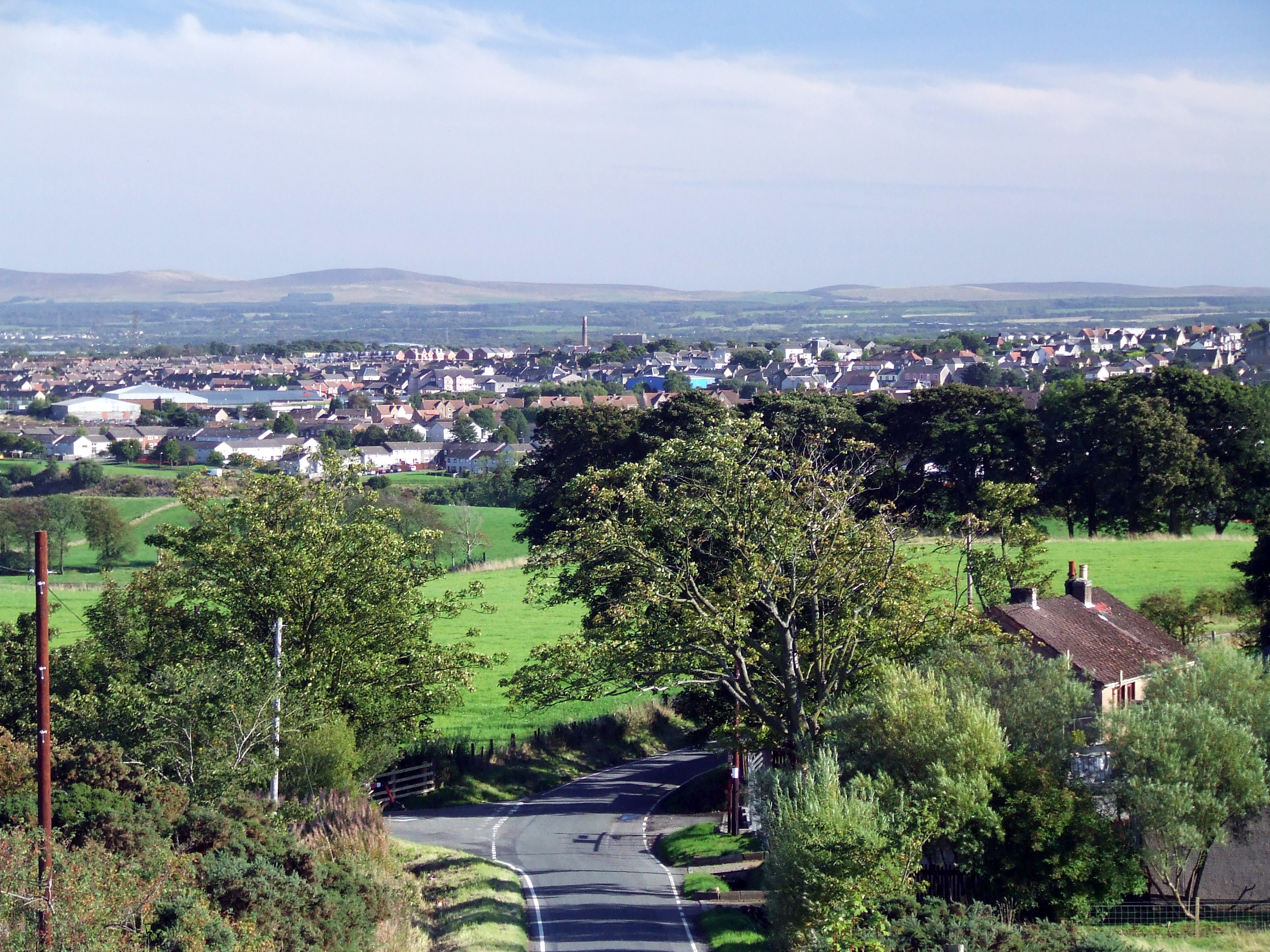
The town of Armadale

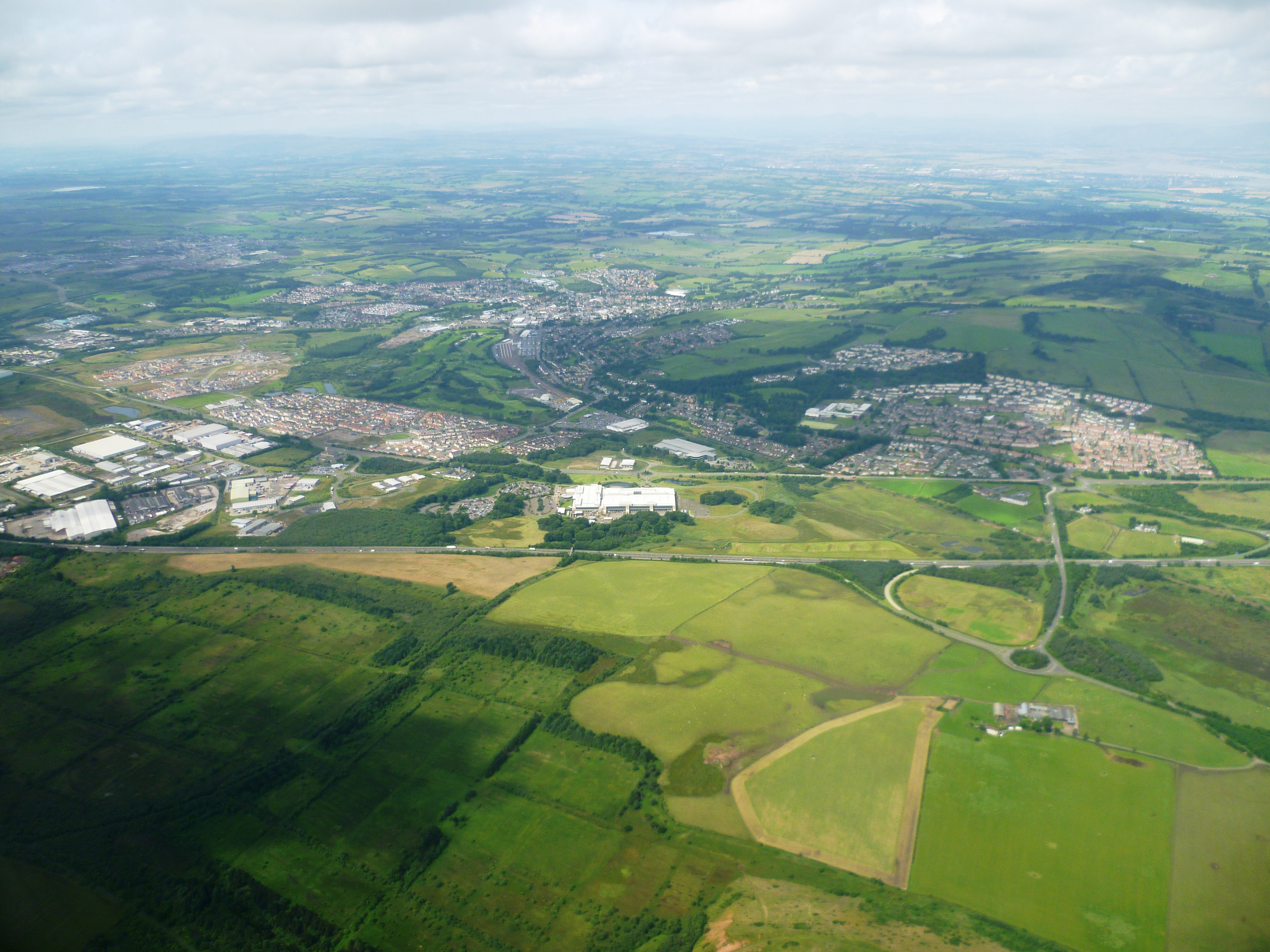
The town of Bathgate seen from the air

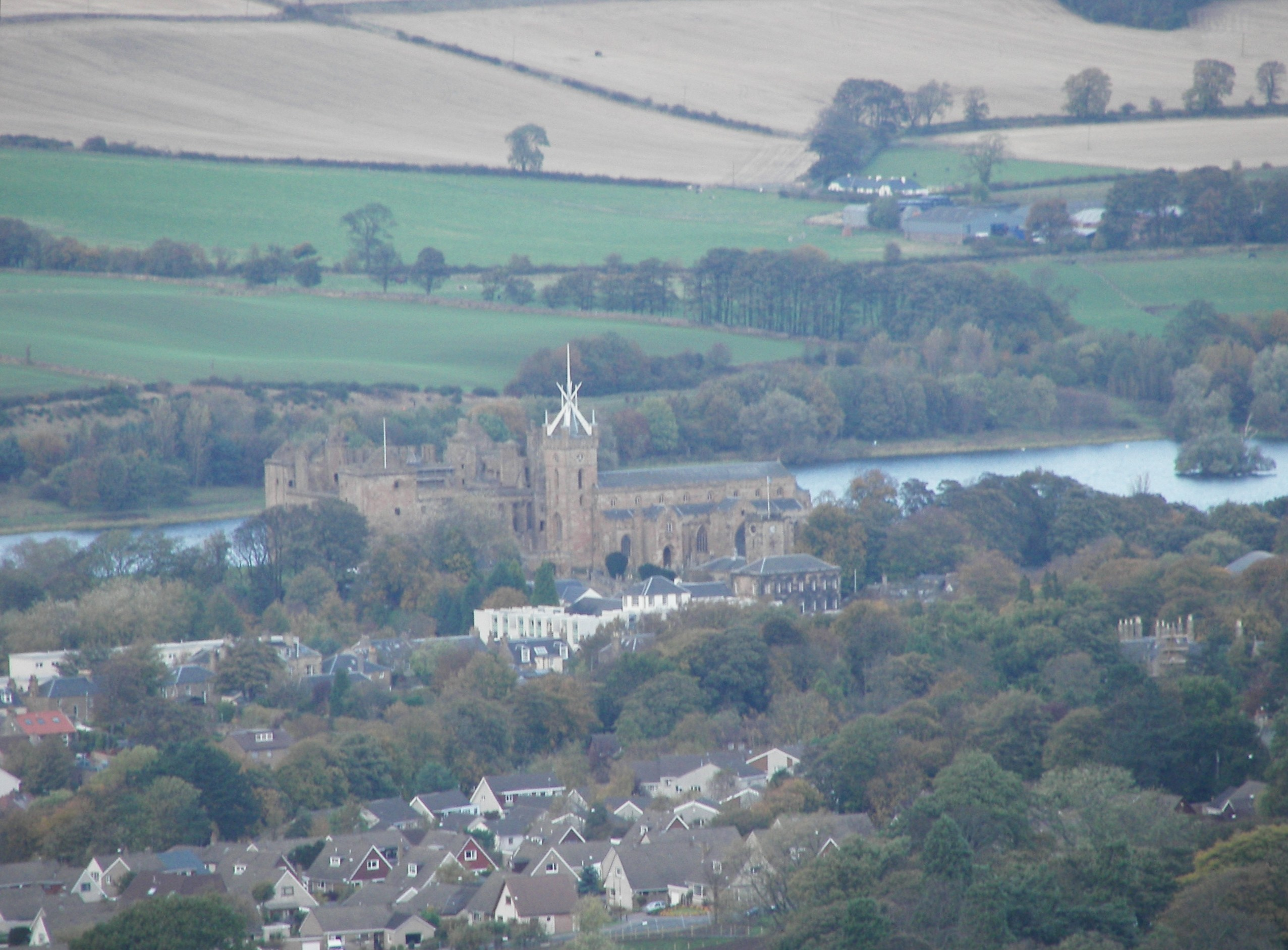
Linlithgow Palace in Linlithgow, seen from Cockleroy Hill

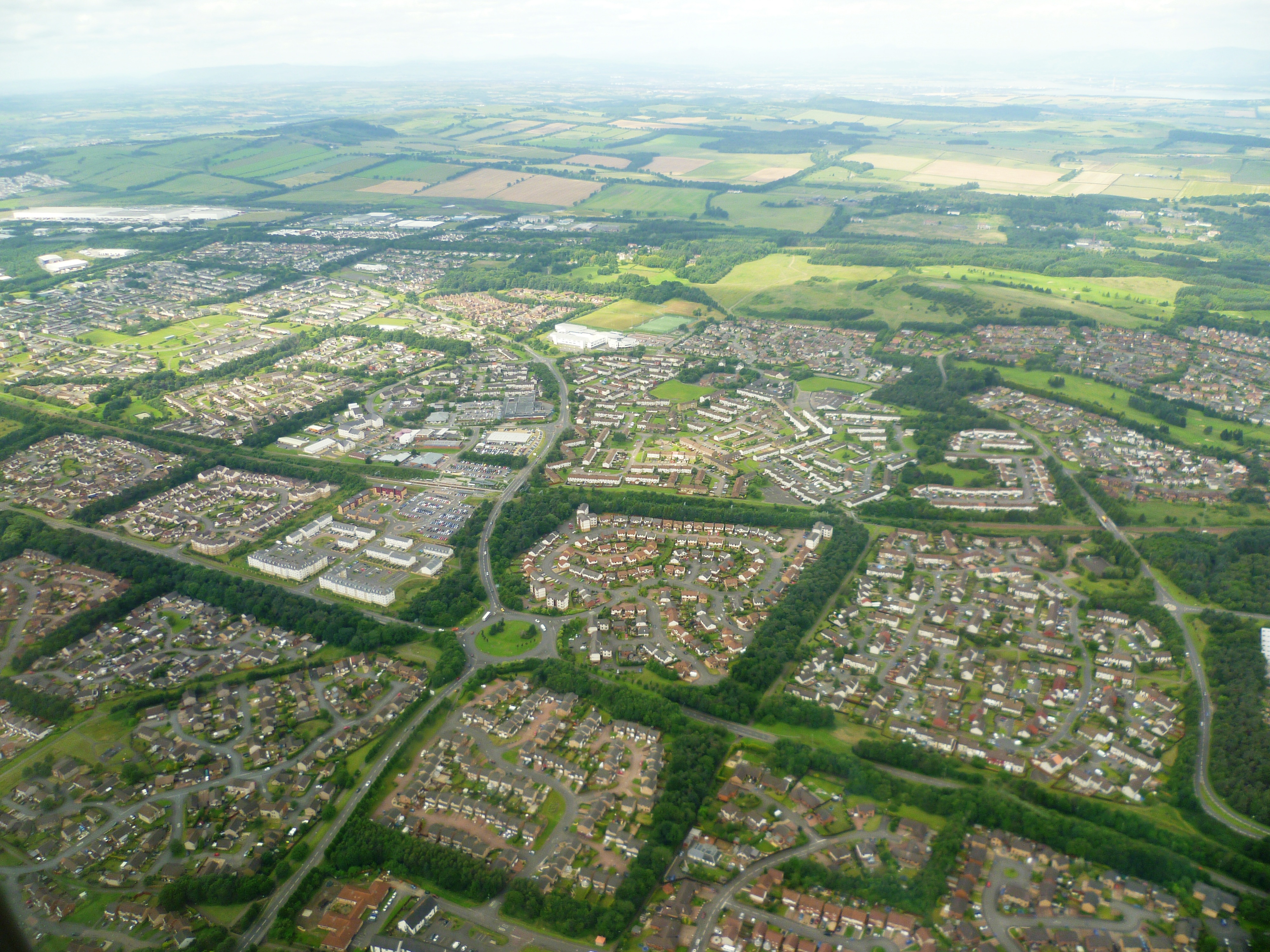
The town of Livingston seen from the air

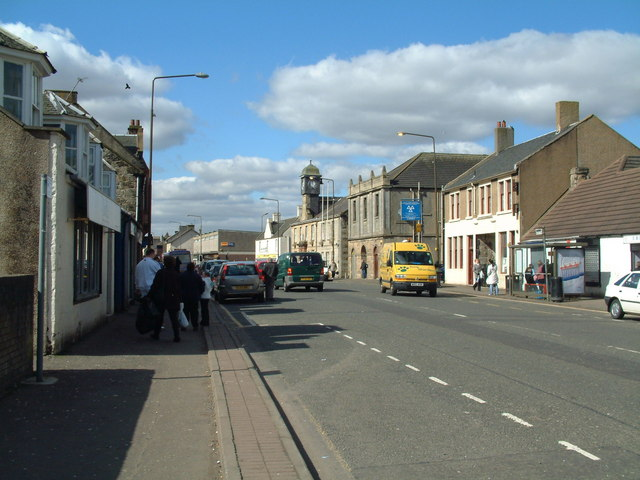
The town of Whitburn

== Demographics ==
Ethnic Group	2001		2011		2022	
Ethnic Group	Number	%	Number	%	Number	%
White: Total	156,581	98.66%	170,850	97.56%	171,816	94.78%
White: Scottish	144,533	91.07%	153,815	87.84%	147,073	81.13%
White: Other British	9,281	5.85%	10,204	5.83%	12,959	7.15%
White: Irish	1,169	0.74%	1,209	0.69%	1,290	0.71%
White: Gypsy/Traveller (Note: New category created for the 2011 census)	–	–	79	–	70	–
White: Polish	–	–	3,273	1.87%	5,568	3.07%
White: Other	1,598	1.01%	2,270	1.30%	4,853	2.68%
Asian, Asian Scottish or Asian British: Total	1,345	0.85%	2,941	1.68%	5,056	2.79%
Asian, Asian Scottish or Asian British: Indian	184	0.12%	641	0.37%	1,315	0.73%
Asian, Asian Scottish or Asian British: Pakistani	795	0.50%	1,420	0.81%	2,338	1.29%
Asian, Asian Scottish or Asian British: Bangladeshi	10	–	11	–	45	–
Asian, Asian Scottish or Asian British: Chinese	248	0.16%	498	0.28%	810	0.45%
Asian, Asian Scottish or Asian British: Asian Other	108	0.07%	371	0.21%	548	0.30%
Black, Black Scottish or Black British (Note: Category restructured for the 2011 census)	26	–	–	–	–	–
African: Total	65	–	457	0.26%	1,439	0.79%
African: African, African Scottish or African British	–	–	445	0.25%	165	0.09%
African: Other African	–	–	12	–	1,274	0.70%
Caribbean or Black: Total	–	–	118	0.07%	163	0.09%
Caribbean	47	–	50	–	68	–
Black	–	–	50	–	15	–
Caribbean or Black: Other	–	–	18	–	80	–
Mixed or multiple ethnic groups: Total	338	0.21%	534	0.30%	1,912	1.05%
Other: Total	312	02.0%	218	0.12%	888	0.49%
Other: Arab	–	–	104	0.06%	329	0.18%
Other: Any other ethnic group	–	–	114	0.07%	559	0.31%
Total:	158,714	100.00%	175,118	100.00%	181,278	100.00%

=== Languages ===
The 2022 Scottish Census reported that out of 175,963 residents aged three and over, 61,440 (34.9%) considered themselves able to speak or read the Scots language.

The 2022 Scottish Census reported that out of 175,966 residents aged three and over, 1,439 (0.8%) considered themselves able to speak or read Gaelic.

== Culture, landmarks and community ==
=== Landmarks ===
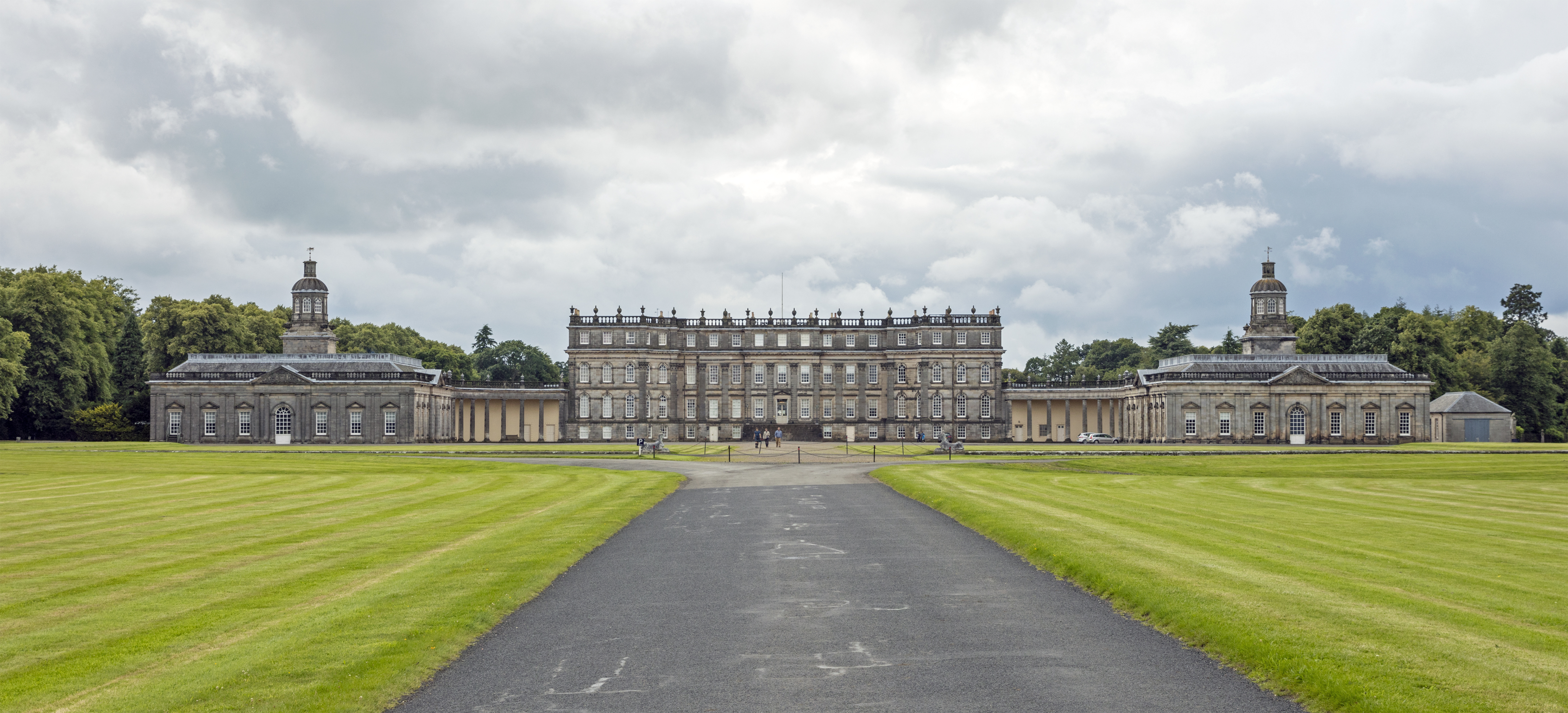
Hopetoun House built between 1699 and 1701 sits within West Lothian

Cairnpapple Hill is a scheduled ancient monument and hill with a dominating position in central lowland Scotland with extensive views.

Torphichen Preceptory is a 12th-century church in the village of Torphichen. It comprises the remains of the preceptory (headquarters) of the Knights Hospitaller of the Order of St John of Jerusalem in Scotland.

Historic houses in West Lothian include Linlithgow Palace, a ruined palace that was one of the principal residences of the monarchs of Scotland in the 15th and 16th centuries and is the birthplace of Mary, Queen of Scots. It is now a visitor attraction in the care of Historic Environment Scotland.

The House of the Binns is an early 17th century historic house and estate near Philpstoun. The house is the historic home of the Binn family whose owners included Sir Thomas Dalyell a Scottish Royalist general in the Wars of the Three Kingdoms, and Sir Tam Dalyell, a member of the House of Commons from 1962 to 2005.

Hopetoun House is a large country house and estate near South Queensferry that was built between 1699 and 1701, and was designed by Sir William Bruce. The house was then hugely extended from 1721 by William Adam until his death in 1748, being one of his most notable projects. The interior was completed by his sons John Adam and Robert Adam. Midhope Castle is a 16th-century tower house on the Hopetoun estate that was used as a location in the Outlander TV series on Starz as the main character, Jamie Fraser's family home called Lallybroch (Broch Tuarach).

==== Castles ====
There are a variety of castles and other historic fortifications in West Lothian, including medieval mottes, tower houses and Renaissance laird's houses, as well as relatively modern castellated mansions. Examples include Cairns Castle, Duntarvie Castle, Midhope Castle and Staneyhill Tower.

=== Community facilities ===
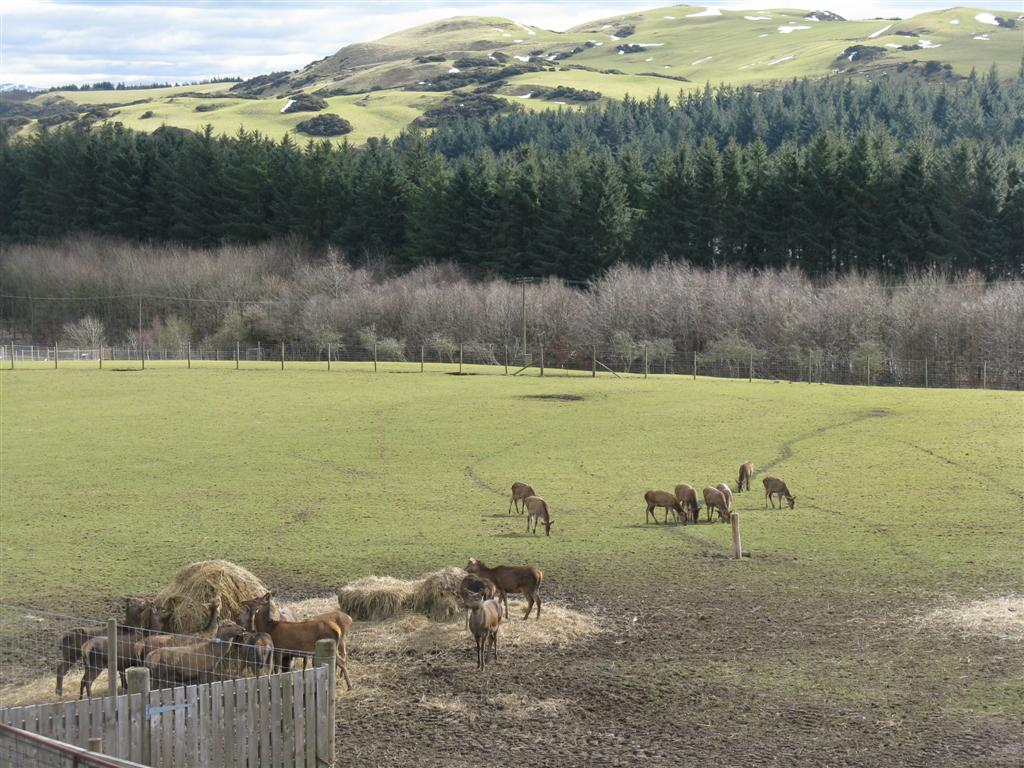
Beecraigs Country Park in the Bathgate Hills

There are several public country parks in West Lothian, including Beecraigs Country Park (a 370 hectare park between Bathgate and Linlithgow with forests, a visitor centre and a loch), Polkemmet Country Park (a 68 hectare park near Whitburn with woodlands, river walks and outdoor facilities), and Almondell and Calderwood Country Park along the Almond river valley near Mid Calder.

Blawhorn Moss is a raised bog located near Blackridge that has been a national nature reserve since 1980 and is the largest and least disturbed raised bog in the Lothians.

==== Health ====
Public healthcare in West Lothian is administered by NHS Lothian within NHS Scotland.

The main hospital for West Lothian is St John's Hospital in Livingston. The hospital has a dedicated Accident and Emergency department with 550 beds and opened in 1989. St Johns is a teaching hospital for the University of Edinburgh Medical School. Other public hospitals include Tippethill House Hospital a community hospital in Armadale and St Michael's Hospital, a community hospital in Linlithgow.

West Lothian previously had a psychiatric hospital with general hospital in the Dechmont area called Bangour Village Hospital. The hospital opened in 1904 and eventually had beds for 55 officers and 2571 other ranks. The hospital started closing in the 1990s and closed completely in 2004 after the remaining services were transferred to St John's Hospital.

The Linburn Centre is a health centre for blinded war veterans at Wilkieston. The centre is located within the estate of Linburn House, a country house which was demolished in 1955.

==== Museums ====
The Museum of the Scottish Shale Oil Industry was created in 1990, to preserve the history of the shale industry in West Lothian and beyond. It is sited on a former mill at Millfield, near Livingston and is attached to the Almond Valley Heritage Centre, a large farm and play area.

In Bathgate, the Bennie Museum is a museum of local history and heritage that is run by volunteers under the management of a charitable trust. It opened in 1989 and is housed used in two former derelict cottages donated by the Bennie family to the local community in 1980.

The Linlithgow Museum is a volunteer-run local history museum in Linlithgow. The museum is housed in the Linlithgow Partnership Centre, along with the West Lothian Family History Society and library.

Military Museum Scotland is a military history museum in Wilkieston that covers Scottish military history from the First World War to the present day.

The Museum of Scottish Railways is a railway museum located within the station yard of Bo'ness at the Bo'ness and Kinneil Railway.

==== Zoo ====
Five Sisters Zoo is a privately owned zoo located in Polbeth, West Calder opened in 2005. The zoo has grown into one of West Lothian's top visitor attractions and was awarded ‘Best Family Day Out’ at the 2024 Scottish Entertainment and Hospitality Awards.

== Economy ==
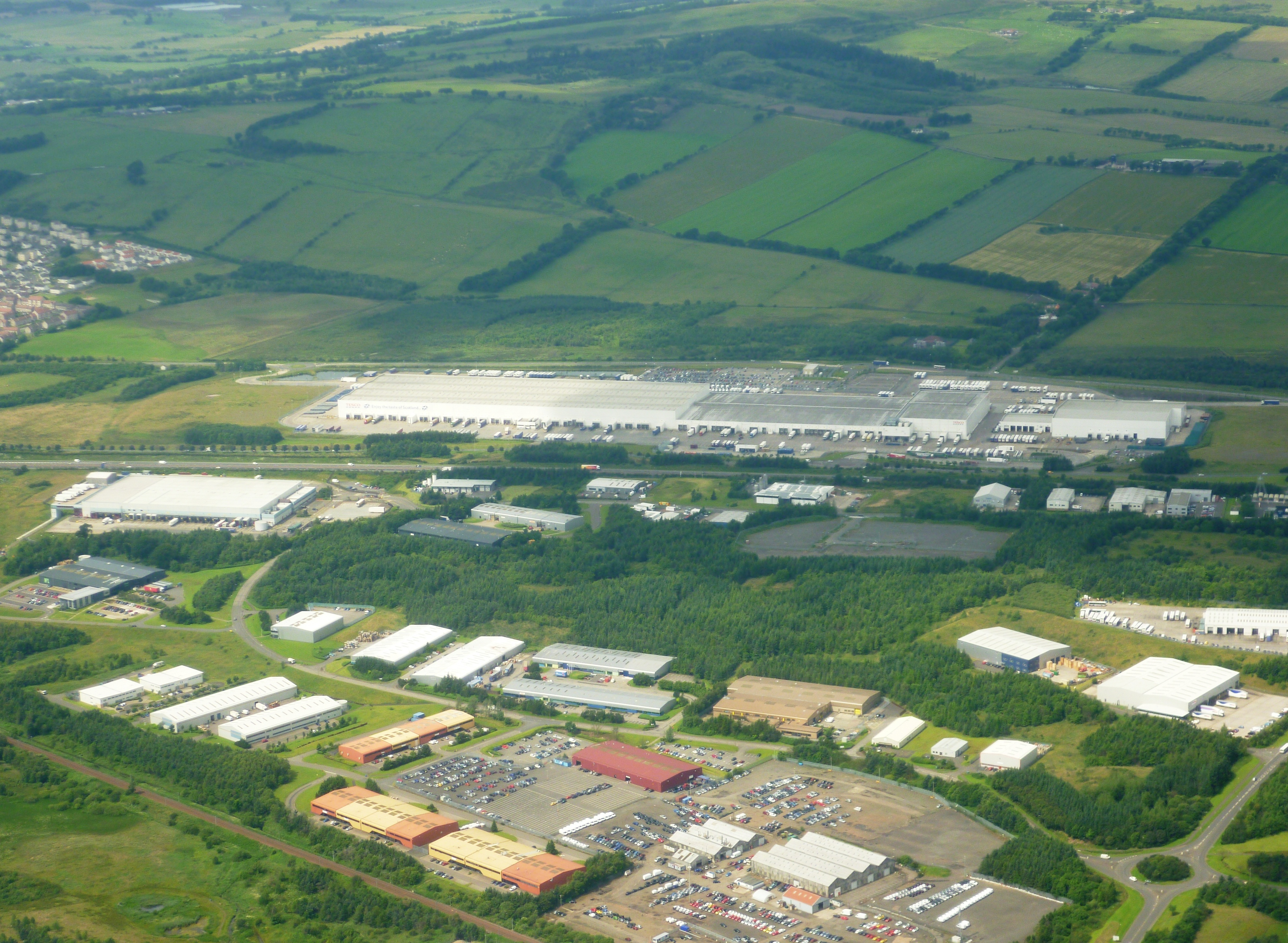
Tesco's Distribution Centre for Scotland and Northern Ireland between Livingston and Bathgate

West Lothian has a diverse economy and as of 2020 had approximately 4,500 businesses providing almost 72,000 jobs in the area. In 2014, West Lothian Council reported that the five largest employment sectors in the council area were healthcare, construction, retail, manufacturing, and business administration and support services. While historically, mining and shale oil production were key employers in the region, as of 2014 they only accounted for 0.7% of persons employed in West Lothian. The ten largest private employers in West Lothian are Sky UK, Tesco, Mitsubishi Electric, IQVIA (formerly Quintiles/Q2 Solutions), Asda, Morrisons, Johnson & Johnson, Schuh, Jabil and Shin-Etsu Europe. The two largest public sector employers in the county are West Lothian Council and NHS Scotland.

The Starlaw distillery is a Scotch whisky grain distillery at Bathgate that is owned by French drinks group La Martiniquaise. The distillery opened in 2010 and can produce 25 million litres annually and has 29 ageing warehouses (cellars) across 75 hectares at the distillery to allow for the maturation of over 600,000 barrels. Glenmorangie, the whisky distillers have offices and a bottling facility in Livingston that was opened in 2011.

West Lothian has several shopping centres, the largest of which are located in Livingston, including 'The Centre' (comprising more than 1,000,000 square foot of retail space) and Livingston Designer Outlet (the largest outlet mall in Scotland). The combined retail spaces of central Livingston form the largest indoor shopping location in Scotland and the 10th largest in the UK.

There are several large scale wind farms in West Lothian, predominantly in the south-west of the county, used to produce electricity across the region, including Pates Hill wind farm, Harburnhead wind farm, and Black Law wind farm.

== Transport ==
=== Road ===
The main trunk roads in West Lothian are:

- The M9 Motorway from the border with Edinburgh, bypassing north of the town of Linlithgow towards Falkirk.
- The A89 road from Glasgow that passes through Caldercruix, Blackridge, Armadale, Bathgate, Dechmont, Uphall, Broxburn before terminating at a roundabout in Newbridge near Edinburgh.
- The M8 motorway that connects Glasgow and Edinburgh passes across West Lothian connecting communities including Livingston and Bathgate.

Other principal A roads in West Lothian include the A71 road (which passes through the south of the county connecting settlements including Livingston, Polbeth, West Calder and Breich), the A899 and A705 in Livingston, and the A801 road which runs from east of Polmont to Whitburn.

=== Rail ===
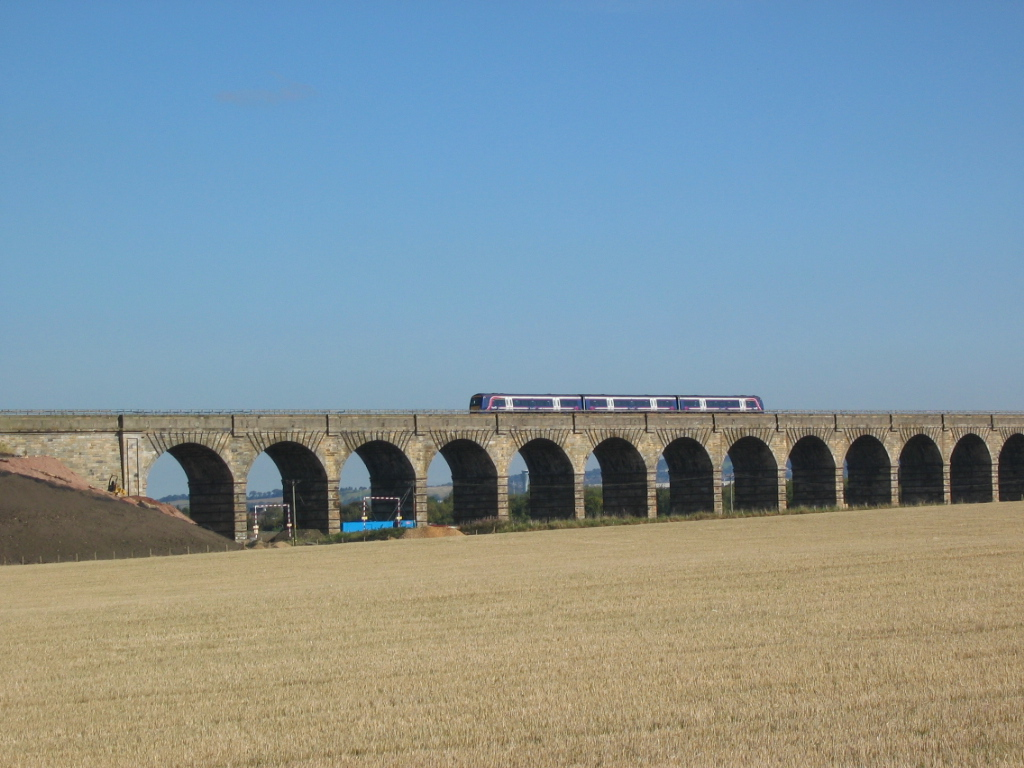
Almond Valley Viaduct in West Lothian between Broxburn and Ratho

Several railway routes run through West Lothian. These include:

- The North Clyde Line between Glasgow and Edinburgh via stations such as Livingston North, Bathgate, Armadale and Blackridge.
- The Shotts Line between Glasgow and Edinburgh via stations such as Faulhouse, Breich, Addiewell, West Calder, Livingston South and Kirknewtown.
- The Glasgow–Edinburgh via Falkirk line via Linlithgow railway station.

West Lothian has a number of former, disused and defunct railway lines, principally branch lines that originated in connection with oil, mineral and shale mining activities in the 19th century but were later closed as traffic diminished and industrial operations ceased.

Many of the railways in West Lothian use significant viaducts to cross rivers, ravines and other difficult terrain. One prominent example is the Almond Valley Viaduct built by railway engineer John Miller to carry the Glasgow–Edinburgh via Falkirk line and completed in 1842. The viaduct is 1.5 miles long with 36 masonry arches, is Category A listed and features as the logo of West Lothian Council.

=== Air ===
West Lothian has no airport or airfields in current operation. The county has a few historic airfields, now defunct, including a temporary airfield that once existed in Bathgate. While the village of Kirknewtown is inside West Lothian, the nearby RAF Kirknewton airfield lies inside the boundary of Edinburgh. The nearest airport in operation to West Lothian is Edinburgh Airport.

== Education ==
West Lothian has 11 secondary schools, 12 special schools, 67 primary schools, and 60 nurseries. While West Lothian has no university, further and adult education facilities are provided at West Lothian College based in Livingston. The college has sports facilities, a library, a training restaurant for hospitality students, and a salon/spa. The college provides educational services to over 8,000 students a year and has 350 staff.

Scotland's Rural College (SRUC) has a campus in Livingston at Oatridge, near Ecclesmachan providing courses on subjects such as agriculture, veterinary medicine, conservation, horticulture, and landscaping. The Scottish Institute of Theatre, Dance, Film and Television has its main educational campus in Livingston.

West Lothian has 14 public libraries. A local and regional history library which includes items on the history of West Lothian and Linlithgowshire is located in Linlithgow.

== Sports ==
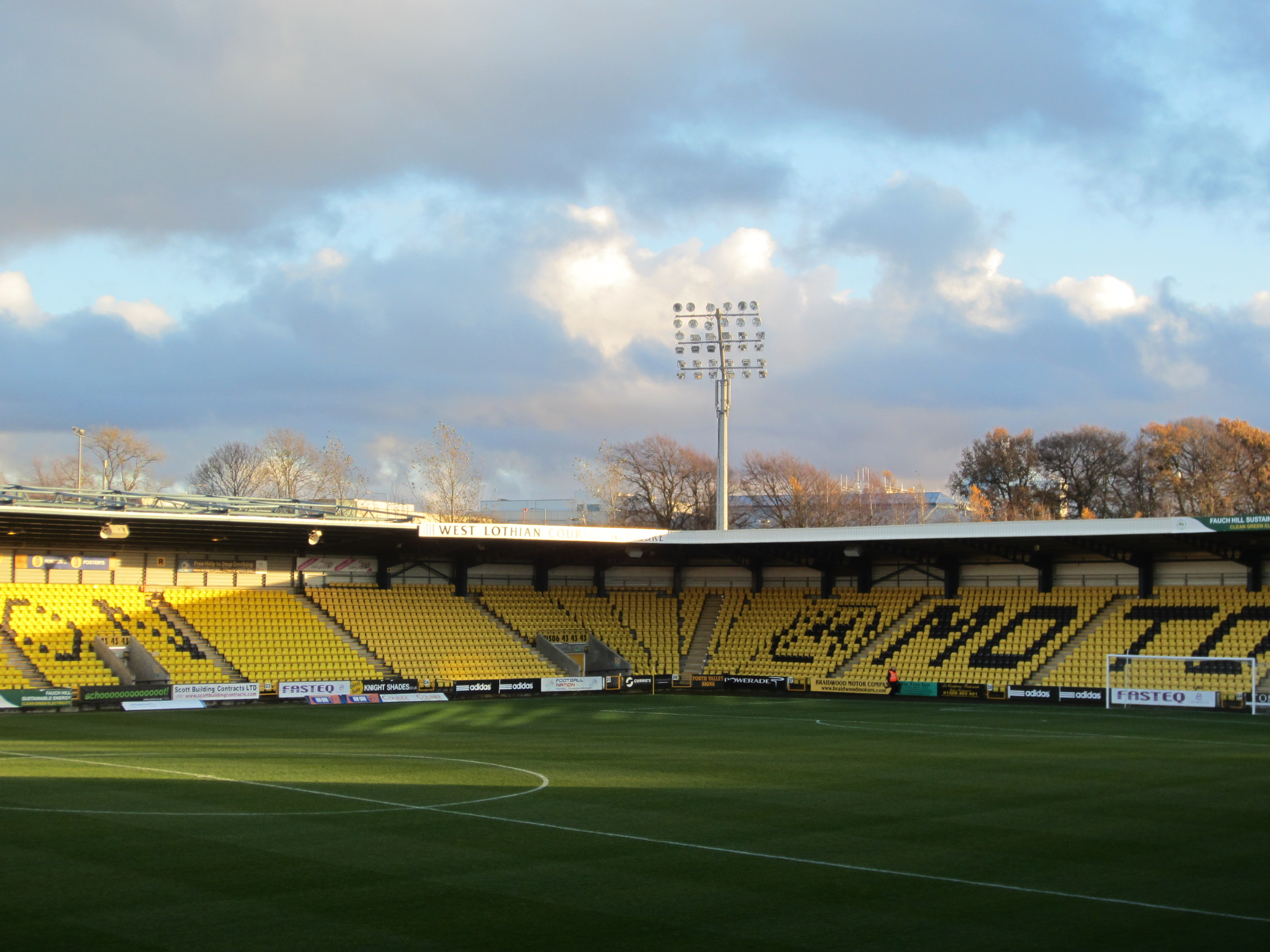
Almondvale Stadium, the home of Livingston F.C. in Livingston

West Lothian has 12 football teams playing across a variety of leagues (tiers) in the Scottish football league system. In the SPFL, Livingston who relocated to Livingston in 1995 to the Almondvale Stadium, represent the county. Linlithgow Rose and Broxburn Athletic currently compete in the Lowland Football League. Meanwhile, previous SJFA league clubs now play across the East of Scotland Football League. These clubs include; Armadale Thistle, Bathgate Thistle, Blackburn United, Fauldhouse United, Livingston United, Pumpherston Juniors, Stoneyburn, West Calder United and Whitburn Juniors.

The West Lothian Sports Council represents a variety of sports clubs and organisations in West Lothian. Other sports teams in West Lothian include Linlithgow RFC, a Scottish Rugby Union club who play in East Regional League Division One, Livingston RFC, and the Edinburgh Monarchs, a Scottish Speedway team, based in Armadale who compete in the SGB Championship. Cricket is played at a local level at sites such as Boghall Cricket Club Ground in Linlithgow.

Swimming facilities are located across West Lothian in most of the towns and Swim West Lothian is an organisation, operating in partnership with West Lothian Council and Scottish Swimming that organises local swimming clubs, training and swimming galas.

== Notable residents ==
Notable residents of West Lothian include monarchs and political figures including Mary Queen of Scots (born at Linlithgow Palace), King James the Fifth (born at Linlithgow Palace), Robin Cook (the Member of Parliament for Livingston from 1983 to 2005), Alex Salmond (from Linlithgow, the former First Minister of Scotland), and Sir Tom Dalyell (the Member of Parliament for Linlithgow from 1962 to 2005).

West Lothian sports personalities include Dario Franchitti (from Whitburn, four-time Indy Car series champion, and three-time winner of the Indianapolis 500), Paul di Resta (from Uphall, DTM race driver for Mercedes-Benz, and the cousin of Dario Franchitti), and Peter 'Snakebite' Wright (born in Livingston, PDC World darts champion).

Actors, musicians and entertainers include Susan Boyle (from Blackburn, a singer who achieved fame on the TV series Britain's Got Talent), Lewis Capaldi (a singer/songwriter from Whitburn and Bathgate), Ian Colquhoun (from Livingston, author and actor), Leon Jackson (from Whitburn, winner of The X Factor in 2007) and David Tennant (from Bathgate, actor)

Figures from industry and academia include John Fleming (from Bathgate, a naturalist, zoologist and geologist), Sir Charles Wyville Thomson (from Linlithgow, a natural historian and marine zoologist), and James Young Simpson (an obstetrician and significant figure in the history of medicine).

== See also ==
- List of places in West Lothian
