= Fred Benham =

Scottish cricketer (1903-1985)

Personal information
- Full name: Frederick Charles Benham
- Born: 18 December 1903; Bexley, Kent, England
- Died: 29 November 1985 (aged 81); Broxburn, West Lothian, Scotland
- Batting: Right-handed
- Relatives: Charles Benham (father)

Domestic team information
- Years: Team
- 1949: Scotland

Career statistics
Competition	First-class
Matches	1
Runs scored	9
Batting average	9.00
100s/50s	–/–
Top score	9
Catches/stumpings	–/–
- Source: Cricinfo, 29 July 2022

Frederick Charles Benham (18 December 1903 — 29 November 1985) was an English-born Scottish first-class cricketer and groundskeeper.

The son of the cricketer Charles Benham, he was born at Bexley in December 1903. He moved to Scotland as a young child, when his father's career as a professional cricketer took him there. Benham was offered a trial by Kent County Cricket Club in 1932, but turned down the offer to remain in Scotland playing club cricket for West Lothian. He played for West Lothian throughout the 1920s and 1930s, during which time he broke his leg while playing in a charity football match in 1934. He continued his association with the club following the Second World War. Benham made a single appearance in first-class cricket for Scotland against Yorkshire at Hull during Scotland's 1949 tour of England. Batting twice in the match, he was dismissed for 9 runs in the Scottish first innings by Ellis Robinson, while in their second innings he ended the Scottish innings not out on 0, with the match ending in a draw. He later coached West Lothian in the 1970s. Outside of playing, Benham was a groundsman, where he was credited with keeping the wicket at Linlithgow as one of the best in Scotland. He died at Bangour General Hospital in November 1985.
