= Sandy Paris =

Scottish cricketer

Personal information
- Full name: Alexander Paris
- Born: 29 August 1908; Torphichen, West Lothian, Scotland
- Died: 19 August 1990 (aged 81); Bathgate, West Lothian, Scotland
- Batting: Right-handed
- Bowling: Right-arm medium

Domestic team information
- Years: Team
- 1937–1938: Scotland

Career statistics
Competition	First-class
Matches	3
Runs scored	40
Batting average	8.00
100s/50s	–/–
Top score	24
Balls bowled	458
Wickets	12
Bowling average	17.50
5 wickets in innings	1
10 wickets in match	–
Best bowling	6/35
Catches/stumpings	2/–
- Source: Cricinfo, 31 October 2022

Alexander 'Sandy' Paris (29 August 1908 – 19 August 1990) was a Scottish first-class cricketer and schoolmaster.

Paris was born in August 1908 at Torphichen, West Lothian. He was educated at Linlithgow Academy, before matriculating to the Edinburgh College of Art. A club cricketer for West Lothian, Paris made his debut in first-class cricket for Scotland against Ireland at Belfast in 1937. He made two further first-class appearances for Scotland, against Yorkshire at Harrogate in 1937, and Ireland at Glasgow in 1938. Playing the Scottish side as a right-arm medium pace bowler, he took 12 wickets at an average of 17.50; he took one five wicket haul, with figures of 6 for 35 on debut against Ireland. As a lower order batsman, he scored 40 runs with a highest score of 24. In January 1957, Paris was appointed president of the West Lothian County Cricket Association.

Outside of cricket, Paris was a schoolmaster who taught arts and crafts. He taught art at Broxburn, before being appointed art master at Bathgate Academy. He spent the next 19 years teaching at Bathgate, before being appointed to the same role at Whitburn Academy in January 1965. Paris died at Bathgate in August 1990.
