= Charles Benham (cricketer) =

Scottish cricketer

Charles Edward Benham (24 June 1880 – 13 December 1961) was a Scottish first-class cricketer who played for Essex and Scotland. A right-arm fast bowler and lower-order right-hand bat, Benham played between 1904 and 1912. His most successful season - 1908 - saw him score two half-centuries with the bat and take thirty wickets at 26.96 apiece. He played two matches for Scotland, scoring 62 runs and taking five wickets.

Benham was born in East Ham, Essex, and he died in Broxburn, West Lothian in Scotland. His son, Fred Benham, also played for Scotland.
