= General Post Office, Edinburgh =

British former post office building

Coordinates: 55.9530°N 3.1884°W

General Post Office
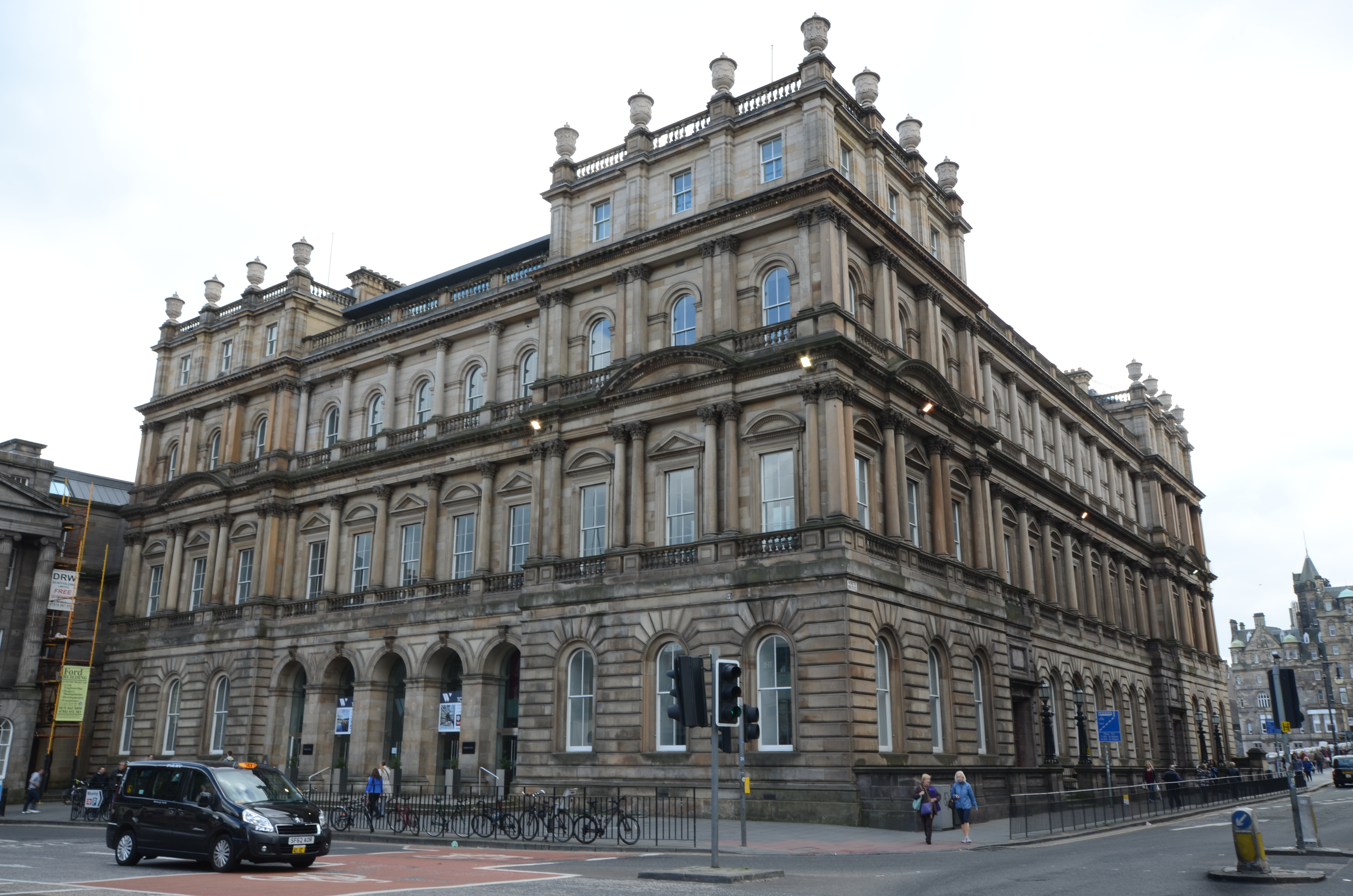
- Interactive map of the General Post Office area

General information
- Type: Post office
- Location: Edinburgh, Scotland

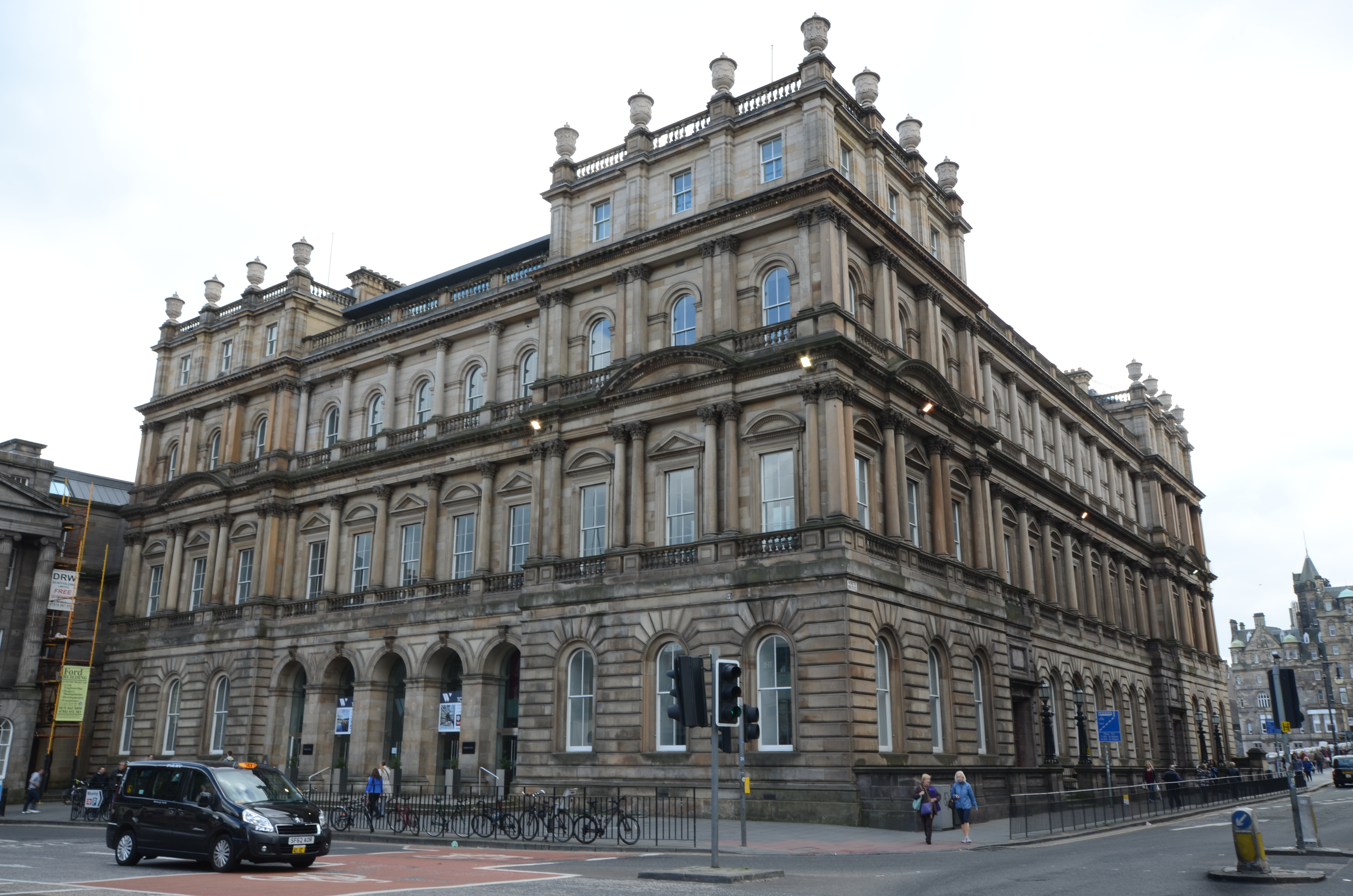
North facade of the former GPO from General Register House on Princes Street

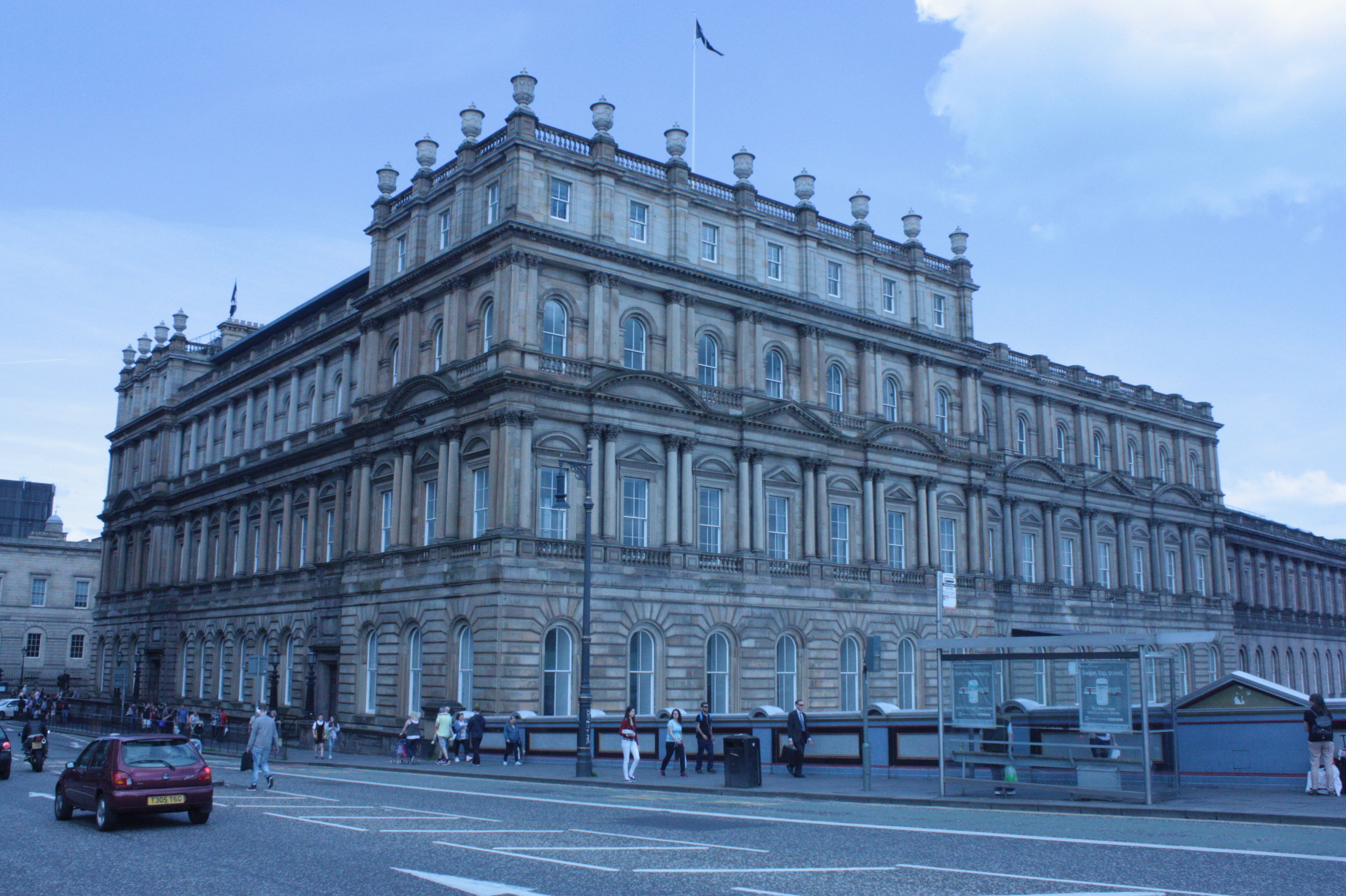
The south facade of the former GPO from North Bridge

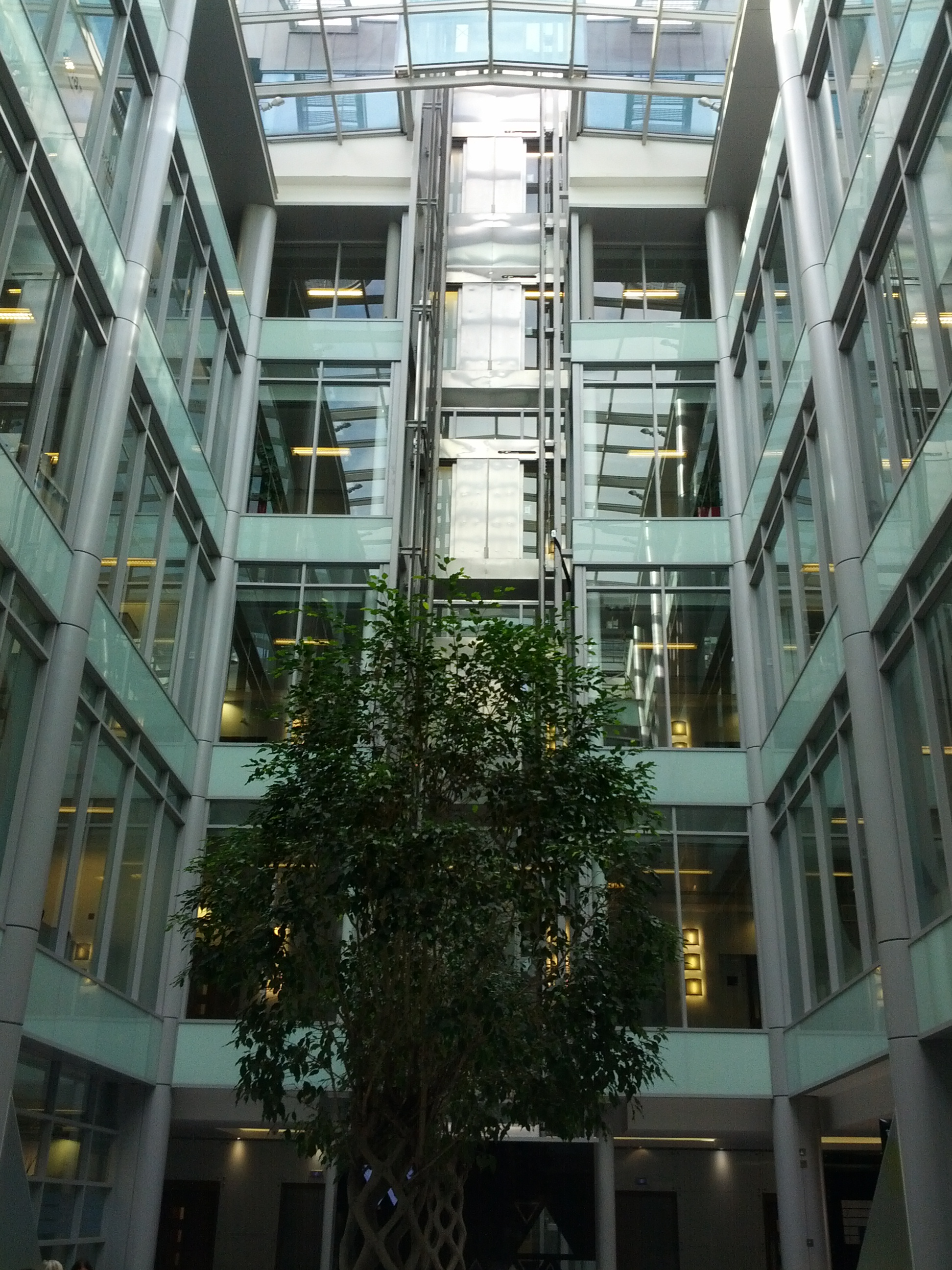
Inner courtyard of the Waverlygate office development

The General Post Office (GPO) is a former post office building in Edinburgh, Scotland. It was built 1861–65 on the site of the Old Theatre Royal, between Waterloo Place and North Bridge, Edinburgh, to the design of architect and Clerk of Works for Scotland, Robert Matheson. In 1861, Albert, Prince Consort laid the foundation stone. The ceremony took place on the same day as the first stone was laid for the new Royal Museum of Scotland (now the National Museum).

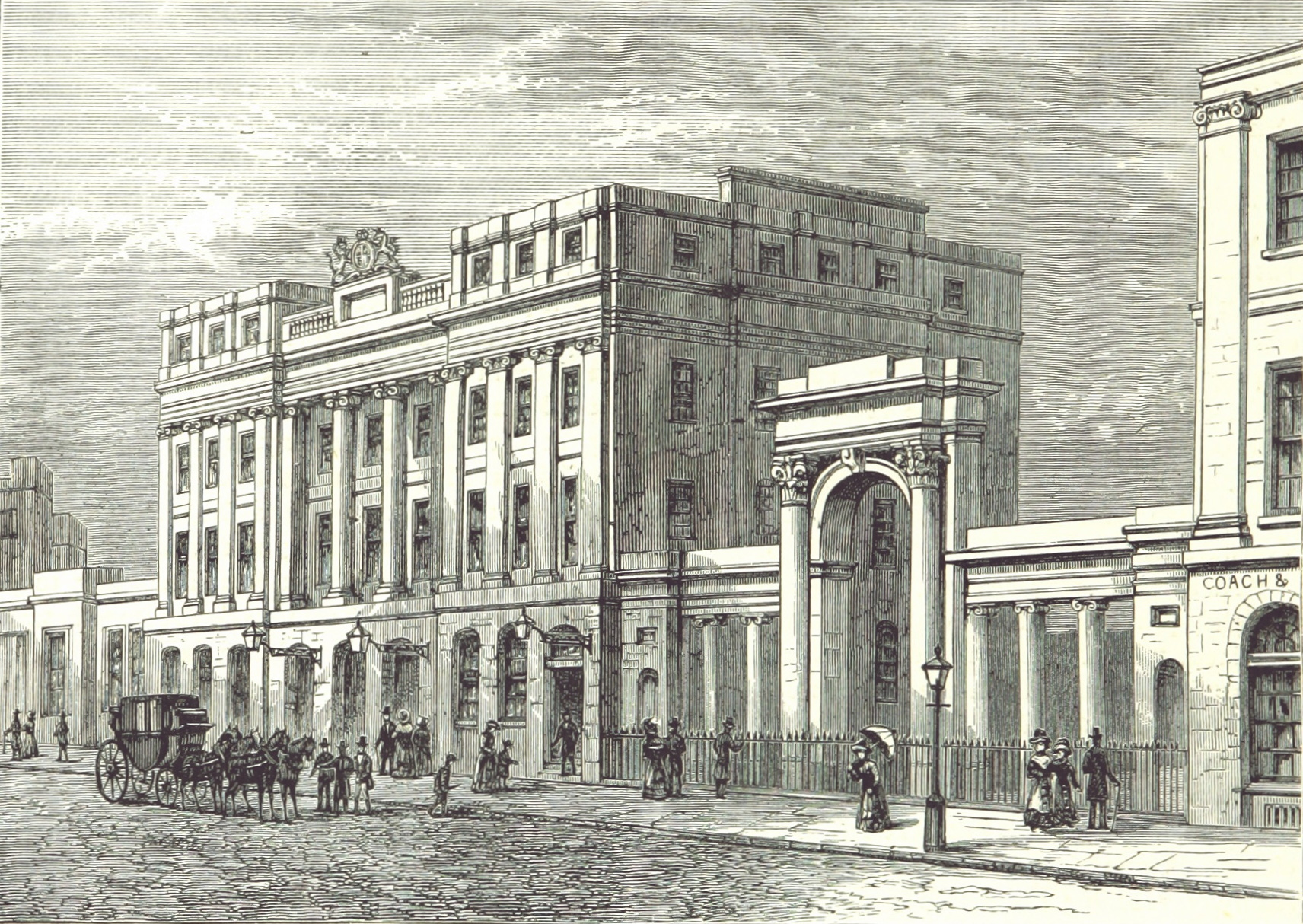
The new GPO replaced the former one opposite beside Regent Bridge at 16–20 Waterloo Place (built 1861–1880)

The GPO adjoined the offices of the Inland Revenue on Waterloo Place and housed offices for other public bodies, including the Commissioners in Lunacy for Scotland and the Scottish Meteorological Society. The new building replaced the post office built 1815–19 on Waterloo Place beside Regent Bridge, and it was twice extended to meet increasing volumes of demand, first from 1890 by Walter W. Robertson and then 1908–09 by William Thomas Oldrieve. In 2000 the interior was removed, to be replaced by commercial office space, leaving only the High Renaissance-style facade.
