= David Fleming (cricketer) =

Scottish cricketer

Personal information
- Full name: David Fleming
- Born: 7 April 1964 (age 62); Broxburn, West Lothian, Scotland
- Batting: Right-handed
- Role: Wicket-keeper

Domestic team information
- Years: Team
- 1986: Scotland

Career statistics
Competition	First-class	List A
Matches	1	4
Runs scored	0	4
Batting average	–	2.00
100s/50s	–/–	–/–
Top score	–	4
Catches/stumpings	3/–	2/–
- Source: Cricinfo, 16 July 2022

David Fleming (born 7 April 1964) is a Scottish former cricketer.

Fleming was born at Broxburn in April 1964. He was educated at the Linlithgow Academy. A club cricketer for West Lothian Cricket Club, he made his debut for Scotland as a wicket-keeper in a first-class match against Ireland at Glasgow in 1986. He later played four List A one-day matches in 1988, making three appearances in the Benson & Hedges Cup and one appearance in the NatWest Trophy against Glamorgan. In these he scored four runs and took two catches. Following a successful club season in 2000, he pushed for a return to the Scottish side following a twelve-year absence, but he was ultimately not recalled. A corner of West Lothian's home ground, Boghall, was affectionately known as "Davie's Corner", so-called due to Fleming's reputation for scoring heavily in that particular corner of the ground. Outside of cricket, Fleming worked as a salesman for a Broxburn meat company.
