= William Thomas Oldrieve =

British architect (1853–1922)

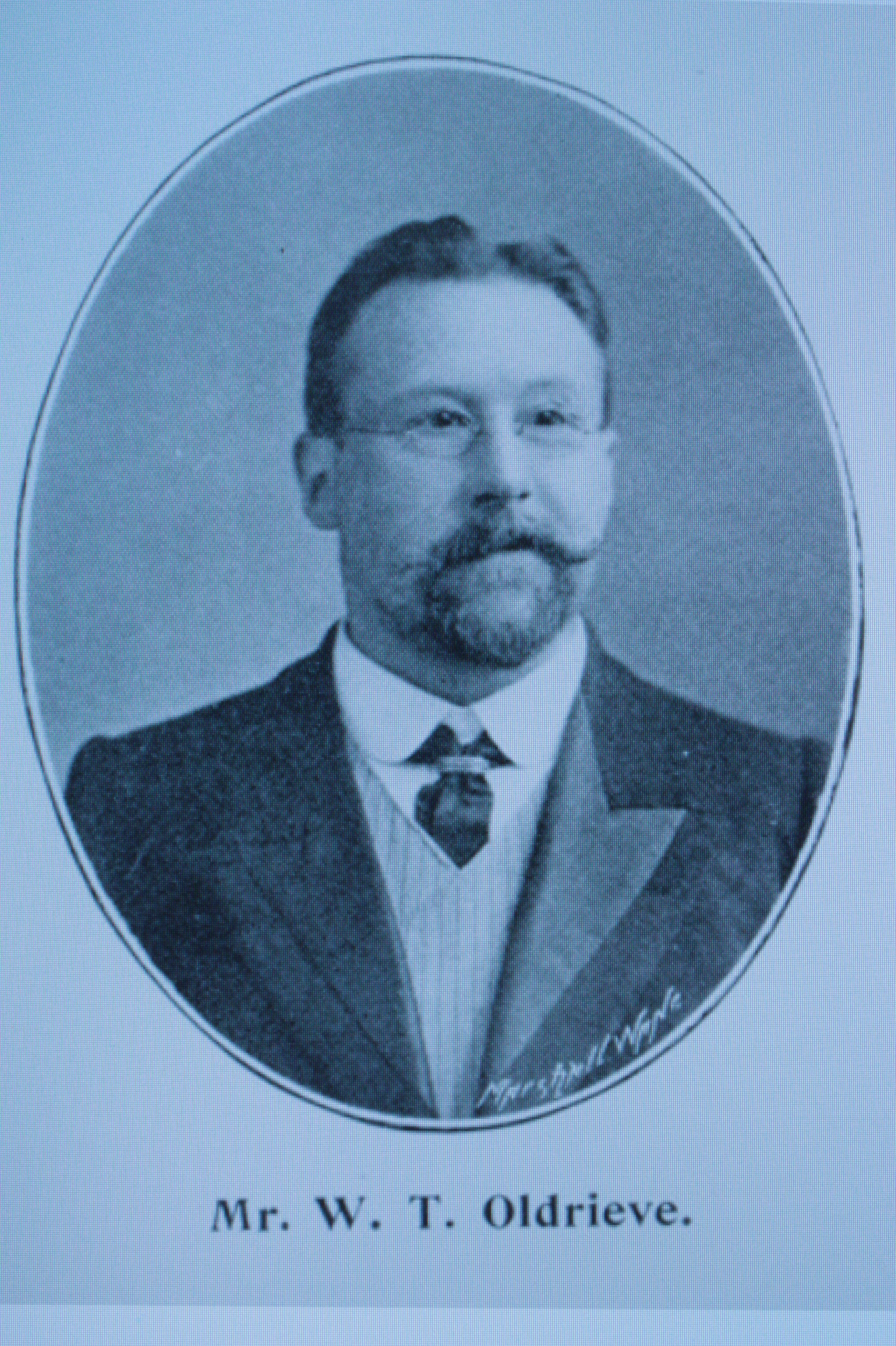
William Thomas Oldrieve

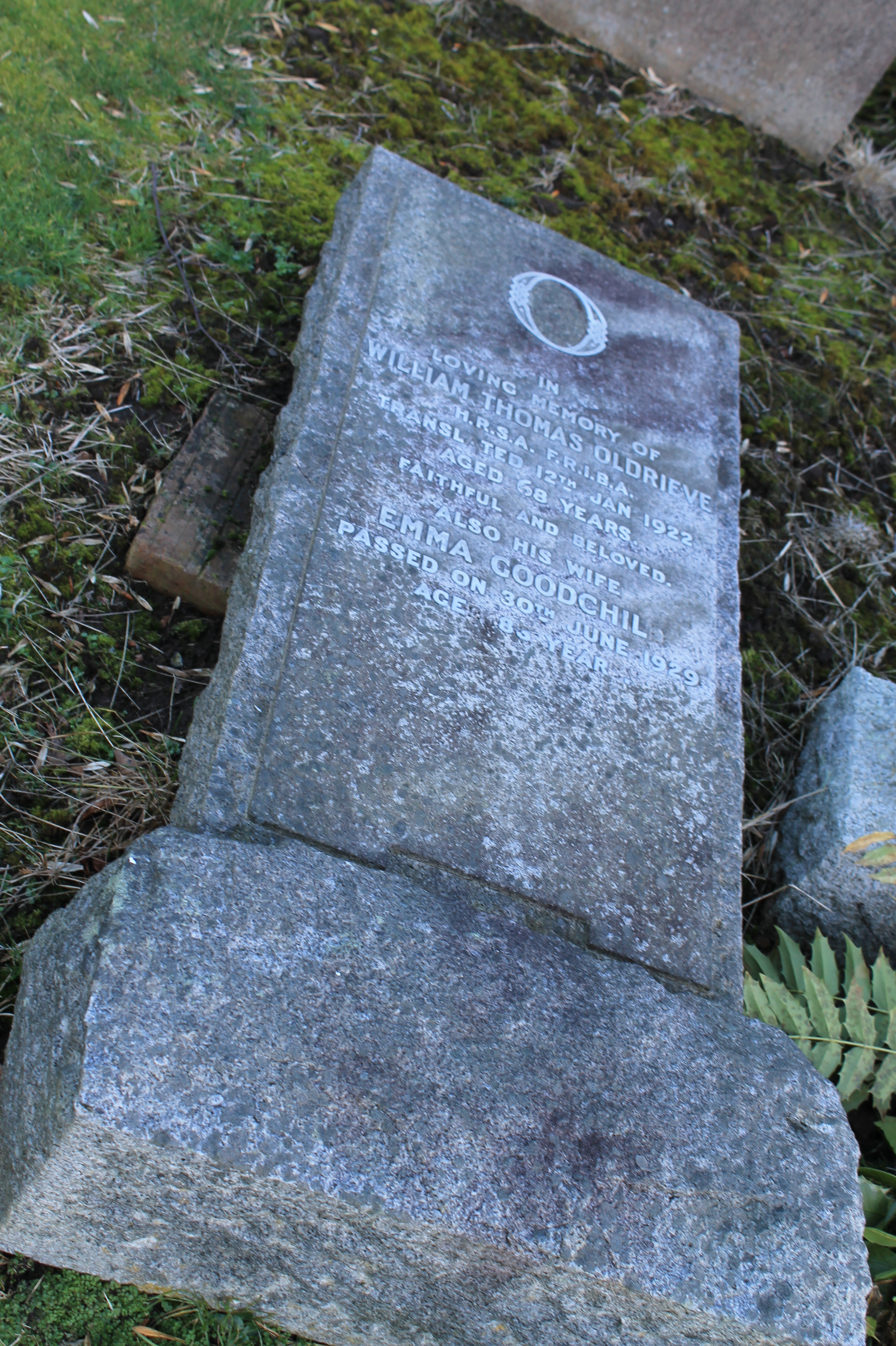
The grave of William Thomas Oldrieve, Morningside Cemetery

William Thomas Oldrieve HRSA FRIBA (15 December 1853 – 12 January 1922) was an English-born architect and scholar primarily associated with public buildings in his role as Architect for Scotland within the Office of Works. His predominant style would be termed "Edwardian Classic".

== Life ==
Oldrieve was from a deeply religious Baptist family. He was born in Totnes, Devon the son of William Oldrieve, Clerk of Works and Elizabeth Tyler.

He was educated at Mansfield Grammar School in Nottinghamshire then served an apprenticeship (1868–71) with his father at Thoresby Hall in Budby, Nottinghamshire, under Anthony Slavin. He then moved to the engineering offices of William Cubitt & Co (1871-3) working under Joseph Cubitt. From there he obtained a post in the War Office attached in a design role to the Royal Engineers, and establishing a lifelong link as an architect/engineer in a civil service capacity.

He remained attached to the Royal Engineers until 1881, during which time he was posted to Edinburgh Castle, a building with which he continued a permanent interest alongside his given role of maintaining its fabric. Soon after he began a deeper interest in design and began to study architecture under Professor Baldwin Brown. He was a gifted student and won several prizes including a travelling scholarship to Europe, where he took a particular interest in Post Office design, a field in which he chose to specialise. He was impressed by designs he found in Berlin, Hamburg, Vienna and Paris.

On his return he was appointed Architect for Provincial Post Offices in England and Wales. This role gave a great deal of freedom as to whether these buildings should be functional or done with flair. Oldrieve chose the latter.

In 1904 (following the retirement of Walter W. Robertson) he was appointed Principal Architect for Scotland, an extremely prestigious role. Oddly this predated his actual acceptance into the professional body, the RIBA, by two years. His role brought him closer to the duty of protecting ancient monuments in Britain and his research work deepened, resulting in a paper in 1908 on The Royal Palaces of Scotland, and papers on the archaeological investigations then ongoing at Holyrood Abbey in Edinburgh.

He retired from public work in 1914 but continued in a consultative role in a newly formed partnership entitled Oldrieve Bell & Paterson. This was with William Wilson Paterson a former Office of Works colleague, and Andrew W Bell the former Dunfermline Burgh Engineer.

In 1917, during the First World War, he was appointed Secretary for the Ministry of Munitions. He was at the same time undergoing a major study, the National Art Survey for Scotland, with the aid of Robert Rowand Anderson and Thomas Ross.

On his Christian side he also played a major role. In Edinburgh he was an elder of the Morningside Baptist Church, President of the Baptist Union (1915), President of Carrubbers Close Mission, and a director of the National Bible Society for Scotland.

His last known address is 11 Merchiston Gardens in south-west Edinburgh.

He died of stomach cancer on 12 January 1922. He is buried in Morningside Cemetery, Edinburgh. The grave lies in a north west row towards the south-west. It is currently lying flat, having been vandalised.

== Family ==
He was married to Emma Goodchild (d.1929).

Their son, Frank Oldrieve, trained as a minister and became Secretary of the Leper Mission in India.

== Principal Works ==
- Remodelling of Glasgow General Post Office, Ingram Street (1892)
- Falkirk Post Office (1893)
- Manchester Parcel Post Office (1894)
- Inland Revenue Offices, Manchester (1896)
- Post Office, Hyde, Cheshire (1899)
- Post Office, Weston super Mare (1900)
- Post office, Aldershot (1900)
- Post Office, Hinckley (1901)
- Post Office, Bridgnorth (1902)
- Post Office, Chatham (1902)
- Post Office, Plymouth (1902)
- Sasine Office at General Register House, Edinburgh (1902)
- Glasgow Parcel Office (1902)
- Merthyr Post Office (1903)
- Southampton Post Office (1903)
- Baptist Tabernacle, Blackpool, Lancashire (1903)
- Musselburgh Post Office (1903)
- Central Telephone Exchange, Edinburgh (1904) (rear building only)
- Alterations and restoration of the Wardlaw Vault, Dunfermline Abbey (1904)
- Eskdalemuir Royal Magnetic Observatory (1904)
- Head Post Office, Aberdeen (1904)
- Post Office, Bootle, Lancashire (1905)
- Banff Post Office (1906)
- North Berwick Post Office (1906)
- Crieff Post Office (1906)
- New water reservoir, Edinburgh Castle (1907)
- Major extensions and remodelling of the General Post Office, Edinburgh (1907-9)
- Stornoway Post Office (1907) (plus later alterations in 1912)
- Montrose Post Office (1907)
- Kilmarnock Post Office (1907)
- Broughty Ferry Post Office (1907)
- Remodelling of Ayr Post Office (1907)
- Remodelling of the interior entrance lobby and hallways in the Inner House of the Scottish Law Courts, Edinburgh (1908)
- Oban Post Office (1908)
- Haddington Post Office (1908)
- Lerwick Post Office (1908)
- St Andrews Cathedral Museum (1908)
- Ornamental lamps in courtyard and gardens of Holyrood Palace (1908)
- Remodelling of the former Edinburgh Life Assurance Offices on the corner of George Street and Hanover Street to accommodate the Royal Society of Edinburgh (1909)
- Major internal refit of the Royal Scottish Academy in Edinburgh (1909–11) including a new staircase and upper galleries.
- 17th-century style oak panelling in west drawing room of Holyrood Palace (1910)
- Bridgeton Telephone Exchange, Glasgow (1910)
- Kelso Post Office (1910)
- Brechin Post Office (1910)
- Glasgow Central Telephone Exchange (1910)
- Remodelling and extension to Glasgow General Post Office (1911)
- Helensburgh Telephone Exchange (1911)
- Major internal refit of the National Gallery of Scotland in Edinburgh (1911–12)
- South extension to Head Post Office in Paisley (1912)
- Wick Post Office (1912)
- Design for offices to accommodate the Scottish Office on Calton Hill. Now the site of St Andrews House, Oldrieve’s 1912 design was never built, the whole concept being delayed and rethought over the course of the First World War.
- New roof and ceiling for Glasgow Cathedral (1913)
- Dundee Labour Exchange
- Bathgate Post Office (1913)
- Early restoration works at Iona Abbey (1921)
