= Robert Matheson (architect) =

Scottish architect (1808–1877)

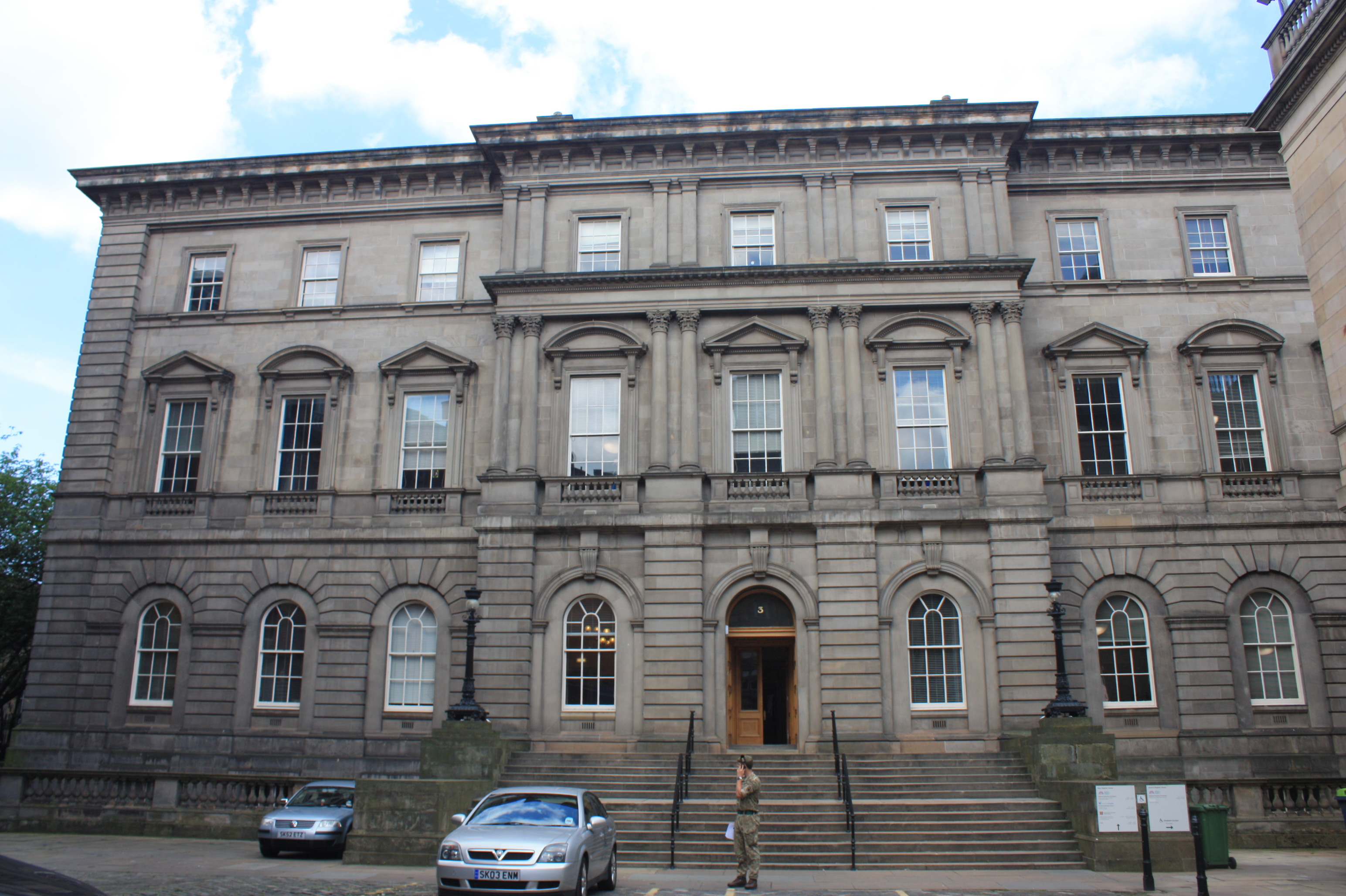
New Register House, Edinburgh

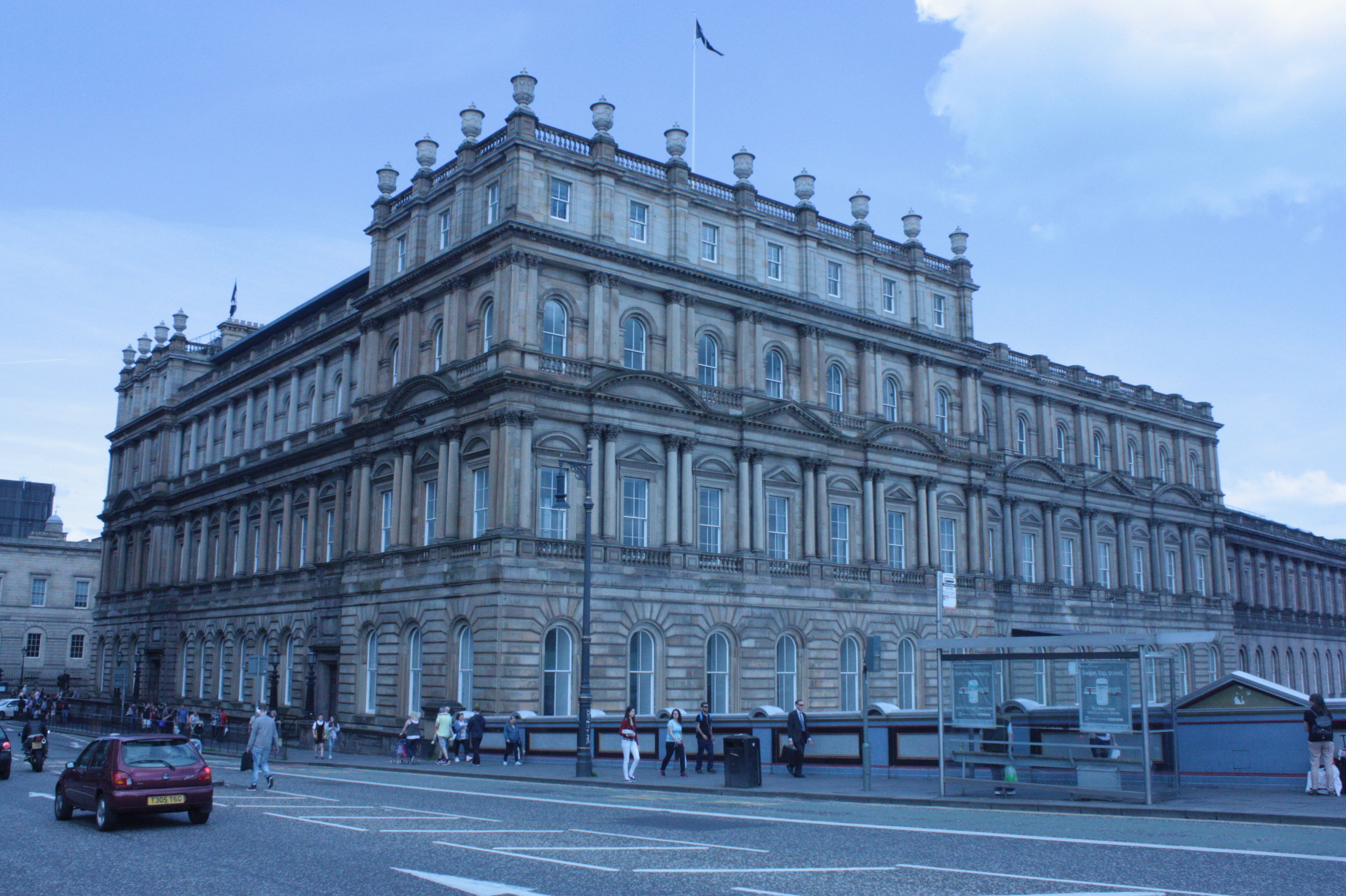
Former General Post Office, Edinburgh

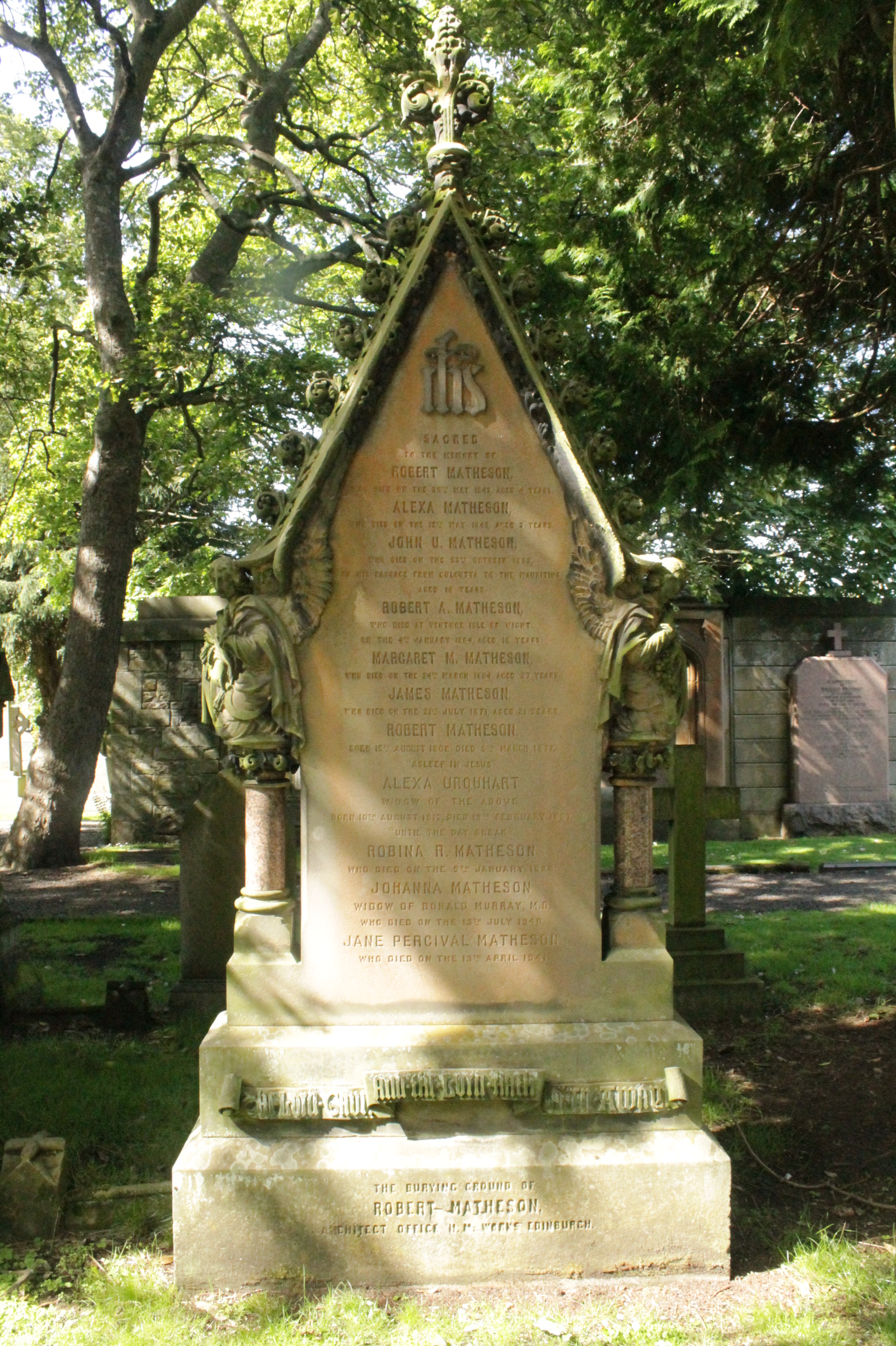
The grave of Robert Matheson, Dean Cemetery, Edinburgh

Robert Matheson (1808–1877) was a Scottish architect operating for some time as Clerk of Works for Scotland and playing a major design role in many buildings, especially within Edinburgh. He was a great master of the Italian Renaissance style.

== Life ==
Robert Matheson was born on 15 August 1808 (date on his tombstone, illustrated in this article) in Tain in the far north of Scotland, which explains later links to this otherwise remote location (see Works). He was the son of James Matheson, a cabinet maker, and Alexie Urquhart. The mother’s name might be wrong as it is curiously similar to the name of Matheson's wife, Alexa Urquhart (1812 - 1897, also mentioned on the tomb stone), or it could be a strange but not impossible coincidence: Matheson could easily have married a cousin, who, given the traditional adherence to a recurring set of first names within a family or clan, might well have had a name similar to his mother's.

In any case, other sources identifying the architect in question as a Robert Matheson, born 29 November 1807 in Edinburgh, the son of Robert Matheson and Elizabeth Fraser, are discredited by the inscription on the tomb stone.

Early life is unclear but in 1828 he became apprenticed to Robert Reid, one of the foremost Edinburgh architects of the period.

In 1848 through a series of events he came to be appointed Clerk of Works for Scotland, a very prestigious role. The role was later renamed Principal Architect and Surveyor for Scotland.

In later life he helped to train James Graham Fairley.

He died at home, 25 Abercromby Place in Edinburgh and is buried in the Dean Cemetery. His stone is fairly elaborate with angels on its shoulders and in a Gothic style very distant from his own style. He is buried with his children (three of whom died very young) and his wife Alexa Urquhart (1812-1897). It lies in the north-west section of the original section, just west of Sir Thomas Bouch's grave.

His role as Principal Architect and Surveyor was filled by Walter W. Robertson.

== Principal works ==
- Restoration of Dunfermline Abbey (1845)
- Restoration of Paisley Abbey (c.1850)
- Restoration of Glasgow Cathedral (1848–55)
- Lodge (now visitor centre) at Linlithgow Palace (1850)
- Restoration of Fortrose Cathedral (1853)
- Palm House in the Royal Botanic Gardens, Edinburgh (1854)
- Refitting of Throne Room at Holyrood Palace (1855)
- Remodelling of Perth Prison (1857)
- Lodges and cottages in Holyrood Park (1857) (as instructed by Queen Victoria)
- Law Room, Supreme Courts of Scotland, Parliament House, Edinburgh (1857)
- New Register House (Sasine Office) Edinburgh (1857-60)
- Central courtyard fountain, Holyrood Palace (1858)
- General Post Office, Edinburgh (1859)
- King’s College, Aberdeen (1859) (library added 1868)
- Restoration of St Duthac’s Church, Tain (1859)
- Internal replanning and new stable block, gatehouse and guardroom Holyrood Palace (1860-1)
- Head Post Office, Perth (1861)
- Restoration of St Salvator’s Chapel, University of St. Andrews (1861)
- Redesign of central garden in Charlotte Square, changing from circular to square form, including new tree planting and a memorial to Prince Albert in the centre (1861 but not built until 1873)
- Lansdowne Crescent/Grosvenor Street development, Edinburgh (1863-5)
- Head Post Office, Dundee (1863)
- Head Post Office, Paisley (c. 1863)
- Restoration of Dunblane Cathedral (1866–73)
- Layout of East Queen Street Gardens, Edinburgh (1867)
- Restoration of Parliament House, Edinburgh (1868)
- Rear Dome and Record Hall added to Register House, Edinburgh (1869-71)
- Overseeing of the completion of Captain Francis Fowke’s design for the Edinburgh Industrial Museum, begun in 1861 (now the Royal Scottish Museum) (1865-70) (following the death of Fowke)
- Internal refit of St Michaels Parish Church in Linlithgow (1871)
- Leith Post Office (1873)
- Head Post Office, Aberdeen (1875)
- Head Post Office, Glasgow (1875–78)
