= Linlithgow Academy =

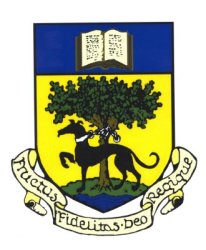

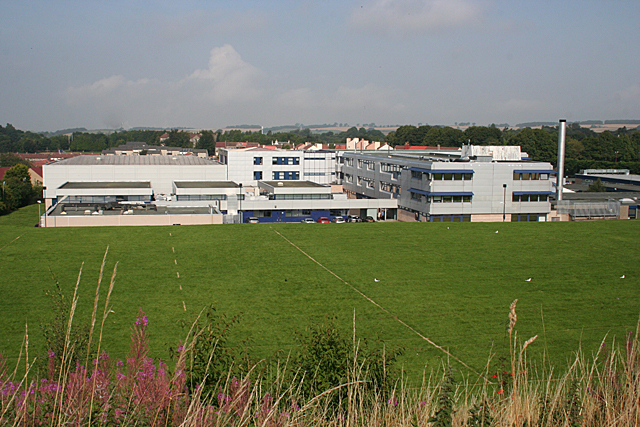
- Linlithgow Academy in 2013

Location
- Braehead Road; Linlithgow, West Lothian, EH49 6EH; Scotland; 55.971°N 3.612°W

Information
- Type: Secondary school
- Established: 1894; 132 years ago
- Local authority: West Lothian Council
- Head teacher: Grant Abbot
- Gender: Mixed
- Website: linlithgowacademy.westlothian.org.uk

Linlithgow Academy is a secondary school in Linlithgow, West Lothian, Scotland. The original academy was built in 1900 to a design by James Graham Fairley and replaced an earlier kirk institution, known as "Sang Schule".

== School leadership ==
=== Headmaster ===
The headmaster of the Academy, Grant Abbot, joined the school in August 2021, replacing the previous head, Karen Jarvis. Prior to his appointment, Mr. Abbot was the headmaster of Bathgate Academy.

=== Depute heads ===
There are three active depute headteachers at Linlithgow Academy; Alison Bulloch, Suzanne Dyer and Ed Marsh.

=== Other members of school management ===
- Margo Brewster (Business Support Manager)
- Scott Brown (Pupil Support Manager)
- James McGrath (Acting PT Math)
- Jackie Campbell (Acting PT Computing Science)
- Sarah Carney (PTC English, Languages & Drama)
- Alison Neilson (PTC Creative (PE, Music/ Art & Design) and Acting PTC Technologies (CDT/HE/Business Education))
- David Rodger (PTC Science)
- Kate Dickson (PTC Humanities)

== Curriculum ==
The school has a heavy focus on arts, sciences and maths, having received a significant funding boost to upgrade science classrooms as well as introducing a new drama classroom and improving upon media and technological capabilities.

== History ==
=== Building ===
The present academy and allocated building were completed in 1968 and has been extended several times since. Most notably the building received a large extension to the physical education department to house the gymnasium, fitness suite, gym halls, changing rooms and swimming pool as well as having capacity for an additional three classrooms and a new staff base. During this extension project the Linlithgow Academy building was found to contain asbestos.

Departments such as the science, craft and design and history departments have also recently received upgrades such as newer Promethean World smart boards

=== Houses ===
The school has three houses. 'Watt', with head of house Stuart Forrester, is named after James Watt and has the colour red. 'Bell', with acting head of house Ruth Thomson, is named after Alexander Graham Bell and has the colour yellow. 'Kelvin', with head of house Diana Mason, is named after William Thomson, 1st Baron Kelvin and has the colour green.

== Catchment and admissions ==
Admissions to Linlithgow Academy are primarily from Linlithgow, but include a number of smaller villages surrounding the town to the east as far as Winchburgh, some six miles away. As the West Lothian/Falkirk council boundary lies just to the west of Linlithgow Bridge, a relatively small number of pupils attend from this direction. Similarly, high schools in Bathgate to the south, and Bo'ness to the north, limit the natural catchment in those directions. However, as the school featured prominently in league tables compared to other state schools, especially those nearby, many people from the surrounding area wish their children to attend Linlithgow Academy in preference to their local high school. This, and the increasing population of Linlithgow as a whole in the past 30 years, have led to severe demands on the school's roll. However, over recent years the school roll has been fairly steady with 1,230 reported in 2003 and steady at 1,192 between 2008 and 2010.

A review of the Linlithgow Academy catchment area by West Lothian Council was completed in October 2010, and Torphichen and Westfield Primary Schools were re-zoned into Linlithgow from the 2011 academic year. This change was required due to a new build housing program in Bathgate involving many large developers and approved by West Lothian Council over a number of years.

The current roll is mostly from the following local primary schools:

- Linlithgow Primary School
- Linlithgow Bridge Primary School
- Low Port Primary School
- Springfield Primary School
- Bridgend Primary School
- Winchburgh Primary School (legacy since Winchburgh Academy opened)
- Torphichen Primary School (from 2011)
- Westfield Primary School (from 2011)

The catchment change proposal included approved additional building works to Linlithgow Academy.

== Media coverage ==
Linlithgow Academy was featured in the BBC Two TV show Teen Canteen which aired in early 2013 and featured the then sixth year cooking for the public and learning the importance of business.

== Notable staff ==
- Alasdair Morgan

== Notable alumni ==
Notable people who attended the school include:

- John Stewart Black, (1865 – 12 April 1930), Scottish lawyer, judge and diplomat
- Sarah Calvert, (2001- ), middle-distance runner
- Martyn Day, (1971- ), Scottish politician, MP for Linlithgow and East Falkirk 2015–2014
- David Fleming, (1964- ) Scotland cricketer
- James Fleming, (1901-1962) Scotland cricketer and curler
- William Frater, (1890–1974), stained-glass designer and modernist painter
- William Ellis, (1923-2015) Scotland cricketer
- Sara Ishaq, (1982- ) film director
- Andrew Johnston, (1916-1993) Scotland cricketer
- Calum Johnston, (1992- ) épée fencer
- Margaret Kidd, (1900–1989) Scottish legal advocate, editor and politician
- Kenny MacAskill (1958- ) Scottish politician, Cabinet Secretary for Justice and Home Affairs 2007–2014
- William McIntyre, (1960- ) Scottish novelist and lawyer
- Sandy Paris, (1908-1990) Scotland cricketer
- Alex Salmond, (1954-2024) Scottish politician, First Minister of Scotland 2007–2014
- Ken Scott, (1964- ) Scottish cricketer
- Colin Stein, (1947- ) Scottish international footballer
