= John Stewart Black =

British barrister, judge and diplomat (1865-1930)

- Born: 1865; Scotland
- Died: 12 April 1930 (aged 64–65)
- Education: University of St Andrews
- Occupations: Barrister, judge and diplomat
- Children: 1 daughter

John Stewart Black (1865 – 12 April 1930) was a British barrister, judge and diplomat in Siam.

== Early life and education ==
Black was born in 1865 in Scotland. He was educated at Linlithgow Burgh School, West Lothian, and University of St Andrew's. He was called to the Bar of the Inner Temple in 1902.

== Career ==
Black joined the Consular Service and went to Siam as a Student Interpreter in 1888, being appointed Assistant in 1893, and promoted to First Assistant three years later. He was appointed Vice-Consul at Bangkok in 1897, and Acting Consul and Judge of the British Consular Court at Bangkok in 1901. In 1902, he resigned from Consular Service to become Judicial Adviser to the Ministry of Justice of Siam (1902–1910), and the same year was appointed as Judge of the Supreme Court of Appeal, Bangkok, and Judicial Commissioner for the Provinces. He assisted in drawing up a new Penal Code, and later he assisted in negotiating the Anglo-Siamese Treaty (1909) for which he was mentioned in dispatches.

In 1914, after he left Siam, he settled in Wrotham, Kent where he was head of the special police. During the First World War, he worked at the Ministry of Munitions (1917), and was Assistant Director (Rationing Branch) Ministry of Food (1918).

== Personal life and death ==
Black married Edith Moore in 1898 and they had one daughter. Black was a Fellow of the Royal Geographical Society, and contributed several papers to its journal about Siam. He died on 12 April 1930.

== Honours ==
Black was appointed Knight Commander of the Order of the White Elephant in 1909.
