= William McIntyre (novelist) =

Scottish novelist

William H. S. McIntyre
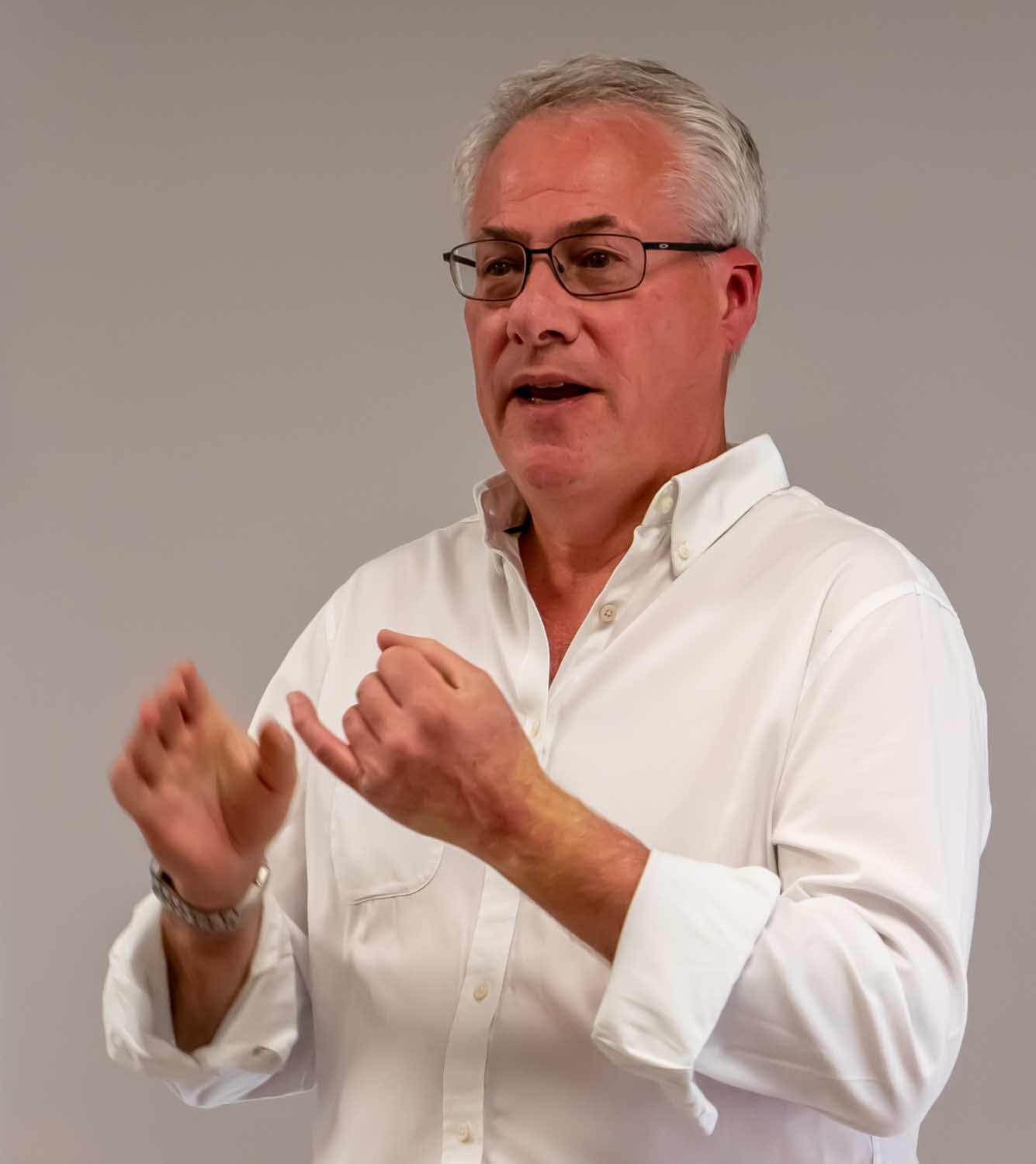
- Author William McIntyre speaking at a BookCrossing Convention, Falkirk June 2023
- Born: 25 March 1960 (age 66); Linlithgow, Scotland
- Occupations: Novelist, criminal defence lawyer
- Spouse: Gillian McIntyre
- Writing career
- Genres: Crime Fiction, Thrillers
- Subject: Criminal Defence
- Website: www.bestdefence.biz

William H. S. McIntyre (born 25 March 1960) is a Scottish novelist whose novels mix comedy, legal procedure, social comment and action. His debut novel was Relatively Guilty and subsequent works have included Duty Man and Sharp Practice. He is a lawyer working in criminal defence.

== Biography ==
McIntyre was born in Linlithgow attending Linlithgow Primary School and Linlithgow Academy. He studied law at the University of Edinburgh. He has been a partner of Russel + Aitken LLP since 1988.

McIntyre is married and has four sons. He writes in his spare time, blogs for the Scottish Legal News and coaches East Stirlingshire F.C.'s 1999 youth (under 16) football team.

== Bibliography ==
=== Fiction ===
- Relatively Guilty (2012), (Vinci Books)
- Duty Man (2012), (Vinci Books)
- Sharp Practice (2013) (Vinci Books)
- Killer Contract (2013) (Vinci Books)
- Crime Fiction (2014) (Vinci Books)
- Last Will (2015) (Vinci Books)
- Present Tense (2016) (Vinci Books)
- Good News Bad News (2017) (Vinci Books)
- Stitch Up (16 August 2018) (Vinci Books)
- Fixed Odds (4 July 2019) (Vinci Books)
- Bad Debt (22 October 2020) (Vinci Books)
- Best Defence (1 January 2022) (Vinci Books)
- How Come? (15 June 2023) (Vinci Books)
- No Problem (June 2024) (Vinci Books)
- Judge Not (June 2025) (Vinci Books)
- Illicit Still (18 June 2026) (Vinci Books)

=== Nonfiction ===
- Alex Munro's Whisky Tour

Written by McIntyre's alter ego, a character from the fictional Best Defence Series, this is a guide to some of the best and most readily available Scots single malt whiskies.

== Recurring characters ==
Some of the recurring characters in the Best Defence series are listed below:

- Robbie Munro, a Scots criminal defence lawyer
- Alex Munro, Robbie's father, ex-police officer, disapproving of his son's profession
- Malky Munro, Robbie's elder brother, former football legend and apple of his father's eye
- Grace-Mary, Robbie's long suffering secretary.
- Jake Turpie, Robbie's landlord and well known local crook.
- Sheriff Albert Brechin, A judge with few doubts, and even fewer reasonable ones
- Fiona Faye Q.C., Robbie's first choice Silk, .
- Cameron Crowe Q.C. Advocate depute, 'Nosferatu in Pinstripes'
- Sandy, Café owner and purveyor of West Lothian's finest bacon roll
- Jill Green, breaker of Robbie's heart
- Andy Ingram, Robbie's annoyingly ethical legal assistant
- Joanna Jordon, Robbie's new legal assistant
- Tina Munro, Robbie's surprise offspring

== Award nomination ==
- Relatively Guilty was shortlisted for the Dundee International Book Prize 2012.
- Bad Debt was longlisted for the McIlvanney Prize 2021.
