= William Ellis (Scottish cricketer) =

Scottish cricketer

Personal information
- Full name: William Arnot Ellis
- Born: 16 September 1923; Bo'ness, West Lothian, Scotland
- Died: 25 April 2015 (aged 91); Larbert, Stirlingshire, Scotland
- Batting: Right-handed

Domestic team information
- Years: Team
- 1954: Scotland

Career statistics
Competition	First-class
Matches	1
Runs scored	6
Batting average	6.00
100s/50s	–/–
Top score	6
Catches/stumpings	1/–
- Source: Cricinfo, 15 July 2022

William Arnot Ellis (16 September 1923 – 25 April 2015) was a Scottish first-class cricketer.

Ellis was born in September 1923 at Bo'ness, West Lothian. He was educated at Linlithgow Academy. A club cricketer for Carlton Cricket Club, Ellis made a single appearance in first-class cricket for Scotland against Ireland at Paisley in 1954. Batting once in the match, he was dismissed for 6 runs in the Scottish first innings by Godfrey Graham, with the match ending in a draw. Outside of cricket, Ellis was a finance clerk. He died in April 2015 at Larbert, Stirlingshire.
