= James Fleming (cricketer) =

Scottish cricketer and curler

Personal information
- Full name: James Millar Fleming
- Born: 5 September 1901; Philpstoun, West Lothian, Scotland
- Died: 4 September 1962 (aged 60); Murrayfield, Midlothian, Scotland
- Batting: Right-handed
- Role: Wicket-keeper

Domestic team information
- Years: Team
- 1926: Scotland

Career statistics
Competition	First-class
Matches	1
Runs scored	51
Batting average	–
100s/50s	–/1
Top score	51*
Catches/stumpings	4/1
- Source: Cricinfo, 17 July 2022

James Millar Fleming (5 September 1901 – 4 September 1962) was a Scottish first-class cricketer and curler.

Fleming was born at Philpstoun in September 1901. He was educated at the Linlithgow Academy. A club cricketer for West Lothian Cricket Club, Fleming was considered one of the best all-round cricketers in Scotland. On the back of this, he was selected to play for Scotland in a first-class match against Ireland at Greenock in 1926. In the only innings in which he batted, he scored an unbeaten 51 batting at number 10. In that same season, he played for Scotland in a minor match at Edinburgh against the touring Australians, captained by Herbie Collins. Later, during the Second World War, Fleming did much to attract first-class cricketers to Scotland and organised Scottish cricket tours.

In 1948, Fleming took up curling and a year later he was a member of the team which won the 1949 Worlds Curling Championships. Fleming was known for his large collection of books on cricket, in addition to his collecting, he also wrote the book Through Wales With Bat and Bottle. He founded the Scottish Cricket Society in 1952. Fleming died at Murrayfield a day before his 61st birthday, following a long illness.
