= Andrew Johnston (cricketer) =

Scottish cricketer

Personal information
- Full name: Andrew Johnston
- Born: 26 February 1916; Linlithgow, West Lothian, Scotland
- Died: 12 April 1993 (aged 77); Kilmarnock, Ayr, Scotland
- Batting: Right-handed
- Bowling: Right-arm off break

Domestic team information
- Years: Team
- 1947–1951: Scotland

Career statistics
Competition	First-class
Matches	2
Runs scored	82
Batting average	27.33
100s/50s	–/1
Top score	50*
Balls bowled	108
Wickets	3
Bowling average	25.66
5 wickets in innings	–
10 wickets in match	–
Best bowling	2/30
Catches/stumpings	2/–
- Source: Cricinfo, 15 July 2022

Andrew Johnston (26 February 1916 — 12 April 1993) was a Scottish first-class cricketer.

Johnston was born at Linlithgow in February 1916, where he was educated at the Linlithgow Academy. A club cricketer for Kilmarnock and West Lothian Cricket Club's, Johnston made two appearances in first-class cricket for Scotland on two separate tours of England. The first came against Warwickshire at Edgbaston in 1947, with the second coming against Yorkshire at Scarborough in 1951. He scored 82 runs in his two matches, with a highest score of 50 not out against Yorkshire. With his off break bowling, he took 3 wickets with best figures of 2 for 30. Outside of cricket, he was employed as a clerk. Johnston died suddenly at his Kilmarnock residence in April 1993.
