= James Graham Fairley =

Scottish architect (1846-1934)

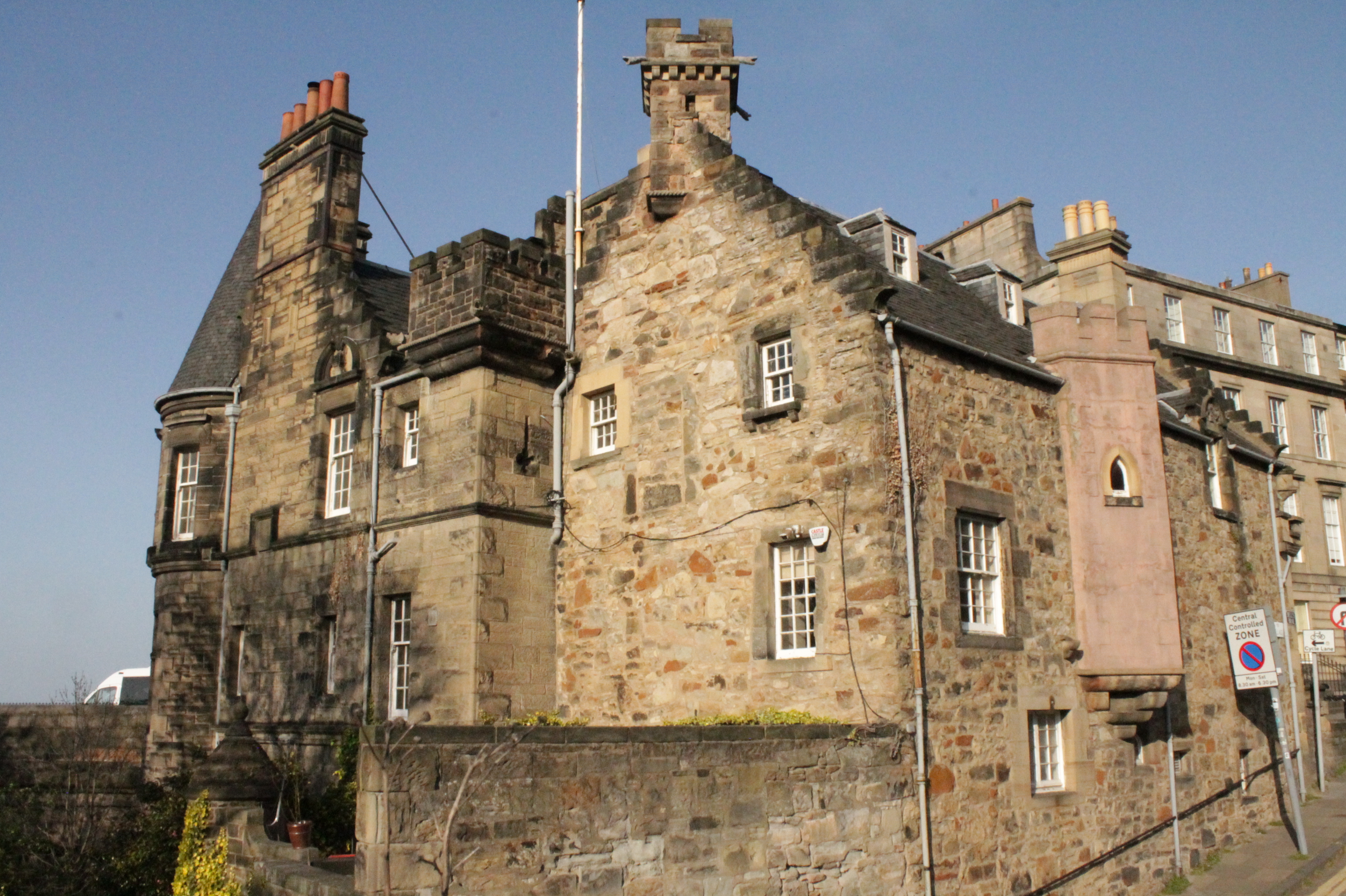
Deanbrae House, Edinburgh

James Graham Fairley FRIBA MSGS (1846–1934) was a 19th/20th century Scottish architect working mainly in the West Lothian area, specialising in churches and schools.

== Life ==
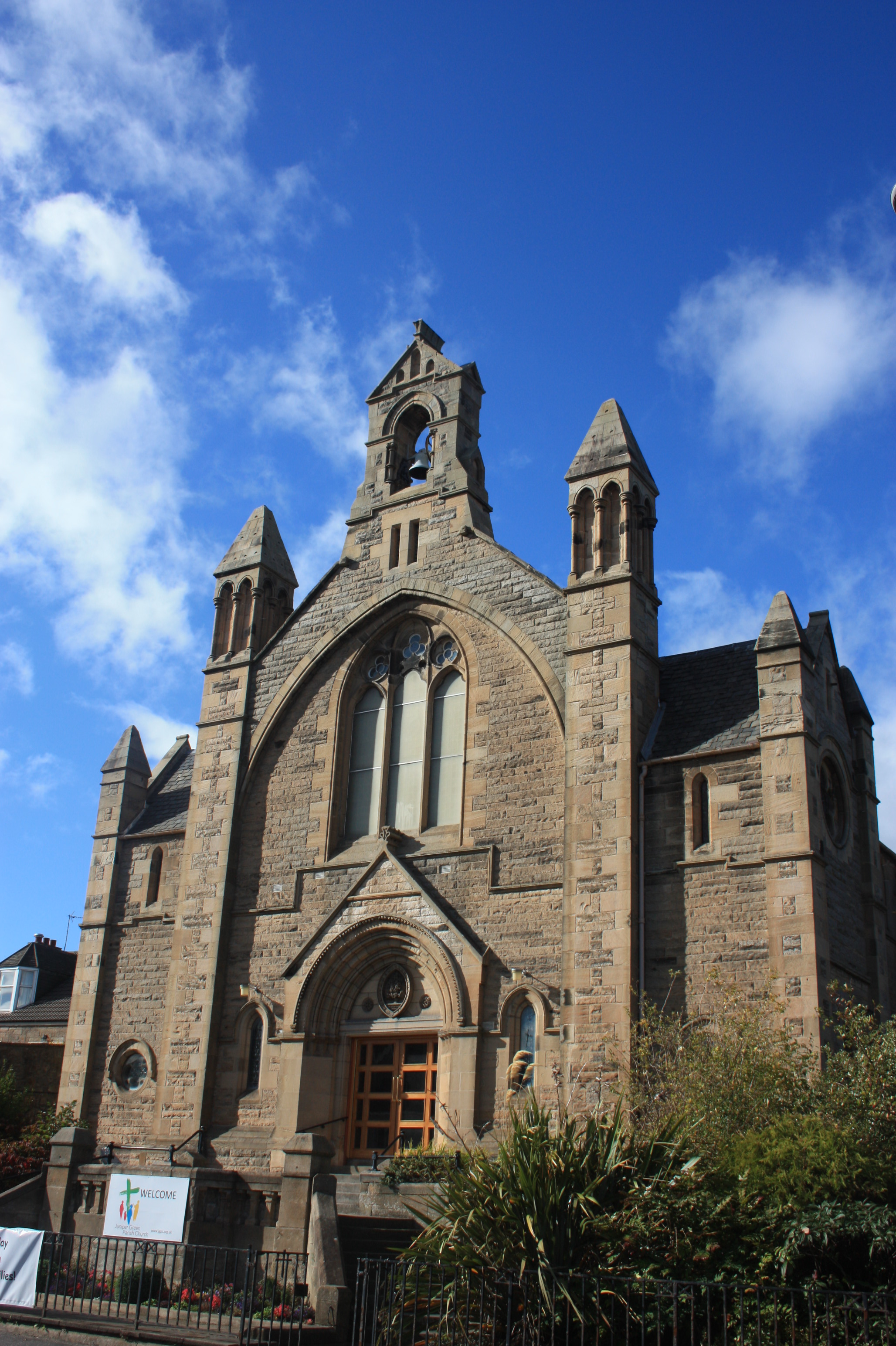
Juniper Green Parish Church

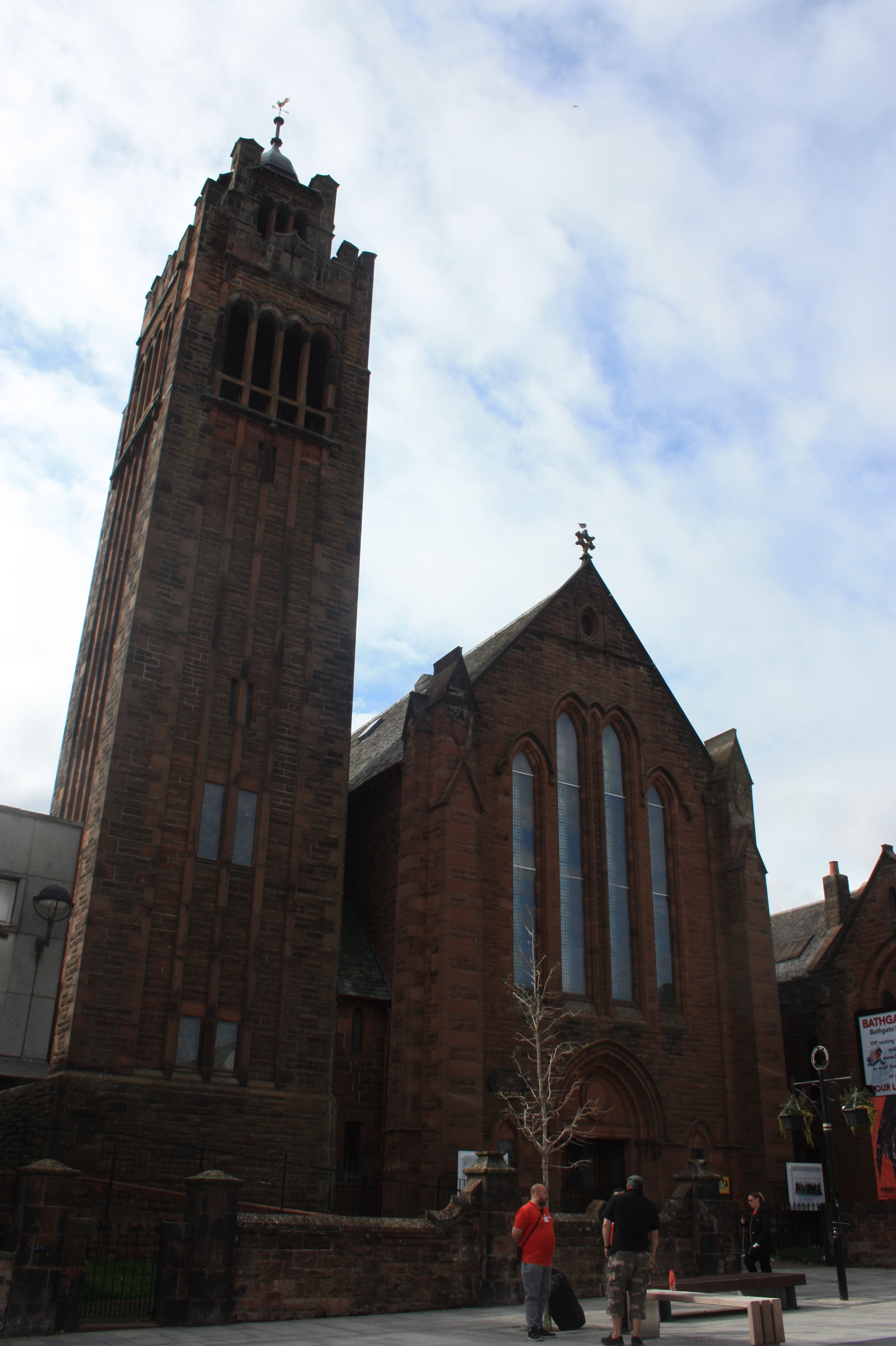
St David's Church. George Street, Bathgate

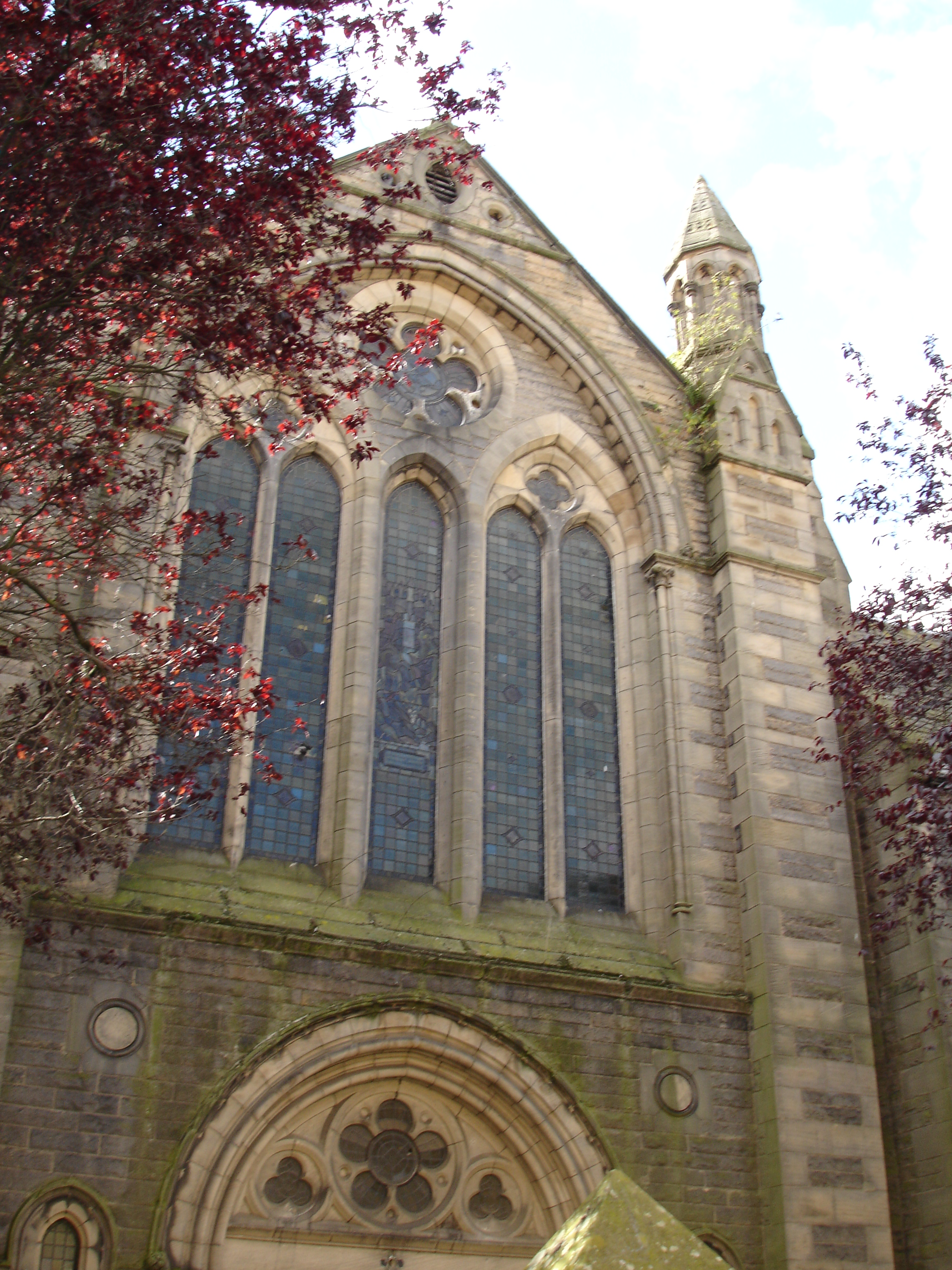
Lorne Street Church, Leith

He was born in West Calder in West Lothian the son of William Fairley, a mill-wright and engineer, and his wife, Elizabeth Graham. He was educated at Edinburgh Academy. He was then apprenticed as an architect to Robert Thornton Shiells at 7 Gilmore Place in Edinburgh. He did further training in the City Engineer's Department under Robert Matheson, whilst also taking engineering classes at the University of Edinburgh alongside Robert Louis Stevenson (who briefly trained as an engineer in his family's tradition). He then went to London for six months in 1873, working under Sir Edmund Frederick du Cane, before returning to Edinburgh to set up his own practice at 21 Rintoul Place in the Stockbridge Colonies.

In 1875 he moved to larger and grander offices at 1 India Buildings at the head of Victoria Street.

He was a member of the Scottish Geographical Society, the Old Edinburgh Club and the Rymour Club.

He died at home, 47 Abercorn Terrace (built to his own design) in Portobello, Edinburgh, on 6 April 1934.

== Known works ==
see

- UP Church and manse, West Calder (1871)
- Broxburn village hall and institute (1874)
- Victoria Hall, Dundee (1875)
- Rattray Street Baptist Church, Dundee (1876)
- Armadale School (1876)
- Trinity EU Church, Dundee (1876)
- Dundee Improvement Act tenements, Victoria Rd etc. (1877)
- School for Benhar Coal Corporation, Polkemmet (1878)
- West Calder School (1878)
- Juniper Green Free Church (1879) (now the Parish Church)
- Colinton/Currie Free Church (1880)
- St Mary's RC Church, Ratho (1880)
- Bathgate Public School (1882)
- RC Chapel Ratho (1883)
- West Calder Co-operative Stores (1883)
- St Paul's Church, Lorne Street, Leith (1884 and extended in 1903)
- Bathgate RC School (1885)
- Buccleuch Memorial Science and Art School, Hawick (1886)
- Girls' School, High School of Dundee (1886)
- Balerno Parish Church (1888)
- Remodelling Broxburn Parish Church (1889)
- St Nicholas United Free Church of Scotland, Broxburn (1890)
- Ward Road Public Gymnasium, Dundee (1890)
- Carshongal (villa) West Calder (1891)
- Glen Lodge, West Lothian (1891)
- St John's RC School Fauldhouse (1891)
- Kirkbrae House, Liberton (1892)
- Deanbrae House, Dean Bridge, Edinburgh (1892)
- West Calder Infant School (1893)
- Remodelling of Broxburn Parish Church (1893)
- Addiewell Board School (1894)
- EU Congregational Church, Bathgate (1894)
- Free Church Mission Hall, Uphall (1894)
- UP Church, Mayfield, Edinburgh (1896 to 1910)
- St David's Church, George St, Bathgate (1896) (now a cinema)
- Sacred Heart RC Church, Cramond (1897)
- Villa in Massachusetts (1897)
- High altar and sanctuary, St Patrick's Church, Edinburgh (1898)
- Suburban villa, Washington D. C. (1898)
- Meadowhead House, West Calder (1899)
- UP Church, Broxburn (1900)
- Linlithgow Academy (1900)
- Bathgate Co-operative Society (1901)
- Blackridge Church (1901)
- Torphichen Street School, Bathgate (1904)
- Dreadnought Hotel, Bathgate (1904)
- UF Church, Hartwood (1904)
- Inch House, Bathgate (1905)
- Bellsquarry School, Livingston (1909)
- Cross Tavern, Whitburn (1909)
- Remodelling of Solsgirth House, Clackmannanshire (1910)
- St Philip's Free Church Hall, Edinburgh (1924)
