= Ken Scott (Scottish cricketer) =

Scottish cricketer and educator

Personal information
- Full name: Kenneth Scott
- Born: 16 June 1964 (age 62); Dechmont, West Lothian, Scotland
- Batting: Right-handed
- Bowling: Right-arm medium

Domestic team information
- Years: Team
- 1985–1988: Scotland

Career statistics
Competition	First-class	List A
Matches	1	8
Runs scored	47	121
Batting average	47.00	15.12
100s/50s	–/–	–/–
Top score	33	34
Catches/stumpings	–/–	1/–
- Source: Cricinfo, 28 July 2022

Kenneth Scott (born 16 June 1964) is a Scottish solicitor and former cricketer.

Scott was born in June 1964 at Dechmont, West Lothian. He was educated at Linlithgow Academy, before matriculating to the University of Dundee. He graduated from Dundee with honours and began his legal training in the city, before working as a solicitor at Fife and Edinburgh. A club cricketer for both West Lothian Cricket Club and Watsonians Cricket Club, Scott made his debut for Scotland against Nottinghamshire in a List A one-day match at Glasgow in the 1985 Benson & Hedges Cup. He played one-day cricket for Scotland until 1988, making eight appearances in the Benson & Hedges Cup. Playing as a batsman in the Scottish side, he scored 121 runs in his eight matches at an average of 15.12, with a highest score of 34. In addition to playing one-day cricket for Scotland, Scott also made a single first-class appearance against Ireland at Coleraine in 1987. Batting twice in the match as an opening batsman, he was dismissed for 33 runs in the Scotland first innings by Hugh Milling, while in their second innings he was unbeaten on 14, with the match ending in a draw.
