= Broxburn =

Town in West Lothian, Scotland

Coordinates: 55.934°N 3.471°W

Broxburn: Scottish Gaelic: Srath Bhroc; Scots: Broxburn/Strathbrock
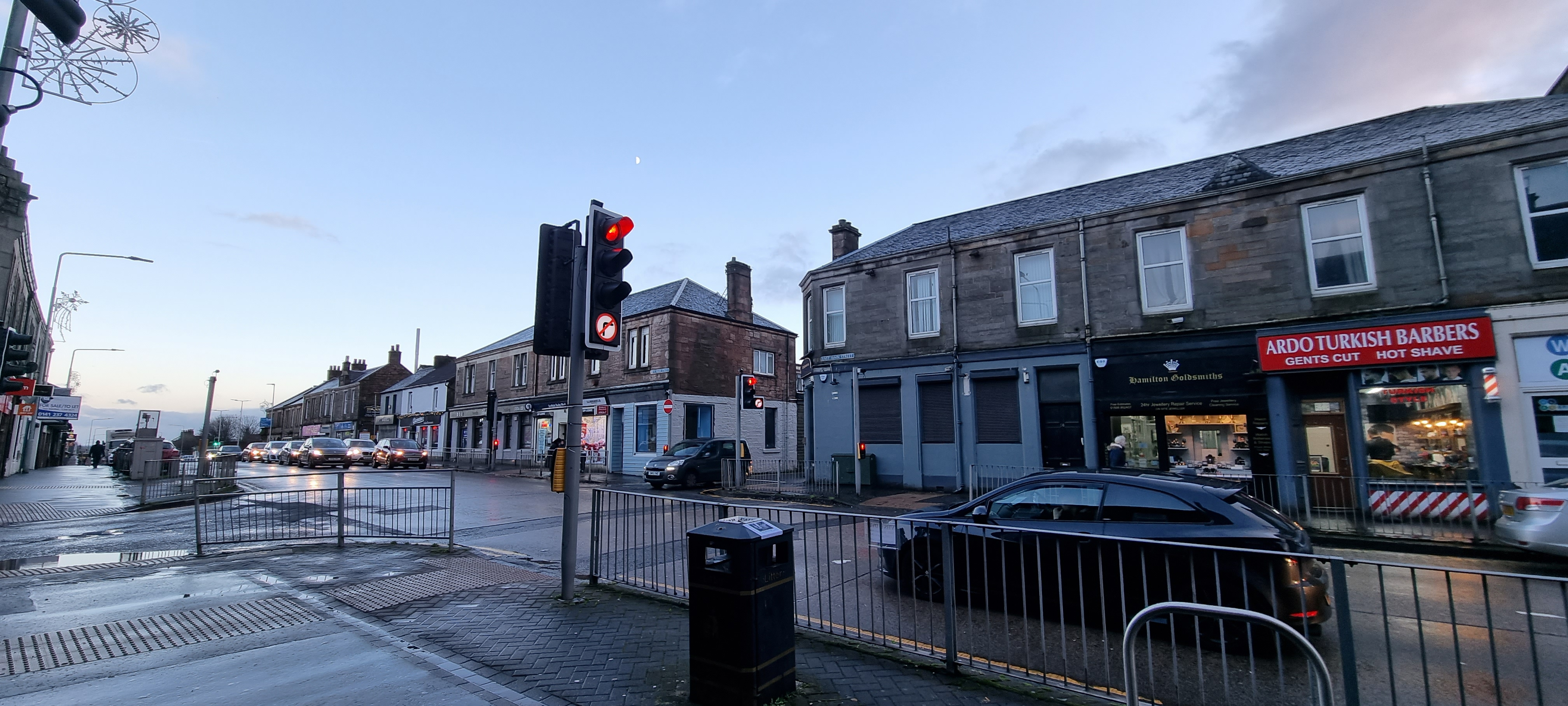
- The junction of East and West Main Street in central Broxburn

- Location within West Lothian
- Population: 15,970 (2020)
- OS grid reference: NT081722
- Council area: West Lothian
- Lieutenancy area: West Lothian
- Country: Scotland
- Sovereign state: United Kingdom
- Post town: Broxburn
- Postcode district: EH52
- Dialling code: 01506
- Police: Scotland
- Fire: Scottish
- Ambulance: Scottish
- UK Parliament: Livingston
- Scottish Parliament: Almond Valley

Broxburn (Scottish Gaelic: Srath Bhroc, pronounced [ˈs̪ɾa ˈvɾɔʰk]) is a town in West Lothian, Scotland. It is 12 miles (19 km) from the West End of Edinburgh, 5 miles (8.0 km) from Edinburgh Airport and 5 miles (8.0 km) to the north of Livingston. Originally a village known as Easter Strathbock in the medieval period, by 1600, the village had become known as Broxburn. The area developed rapidly during the Victorian era as a result of industrialisation related to shale oil extraction. While much of the industry in the area is now diminished, the town has continued to grow following new residential development, resulting in Broxburn forming a conurbation with neighbouring Uphall. It lies just to the south of Winchburgh.

== Etymology ==
The name Broxburn is a corruption of "brock's burn", brock being an old Scots name for a European badger whether from the Gaelic broc or the Pictish/Welsh/Brythonic Broch and burn being a Scots word for a large stream or small river. The village was earlier known as Easter Strathbrock (Uphall was Wester Strathbrock) with Strath coming either from the Gaelic srath or the Pictish/Welsh/Brythonic ystrad meaning a river valley.

== History ==
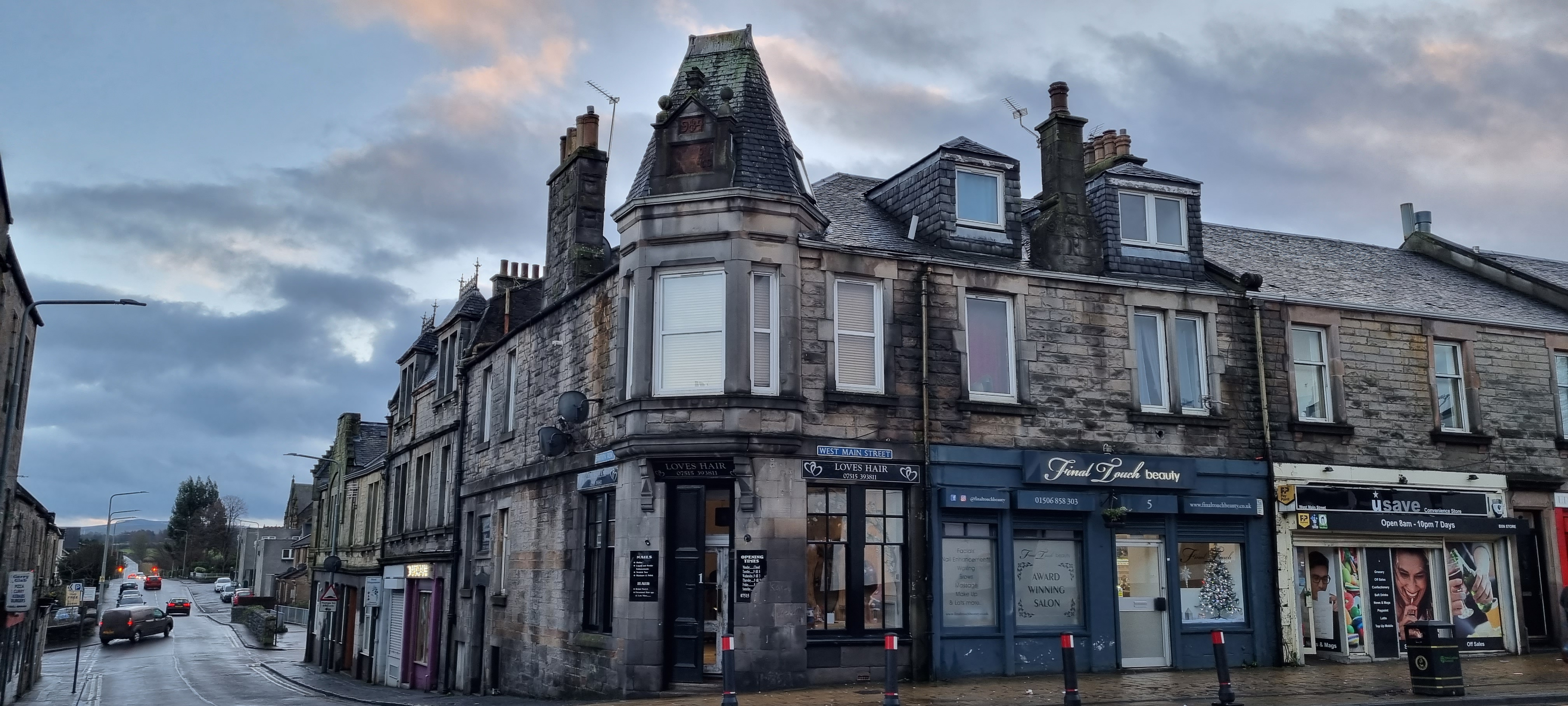
West Main Street and Station Road

The village that later became Broxburn probably originated around 1350 when Margery le Cheyne inherited the eastern half of the Barony of Strathbrock (Easter Strathbrock) on the death of her father, Sir Reginald le Cheyne III. The hamlet that grew up around her residence was then called Eastertoun (eastern town) after the land on which it stood. The lands of Strathbrock were earlier owned by Freskin the Fleming, granted to him under a charter from King David I.

Easter Strathbrock was burned to the ground sometime in 1443-4 during a conflict between William, Earl of Douglas, Lieutenant-General of Scotland, and William, Lord Crichton, Chancellor of Scotland. It was destroyed again in 1455 during fighting between the Douglases and King James II. After the conflict, peace was regained and the town was gradually resettled. In 1590, Kirkhill House was built for John Laing, a local landowner. The village was renamed Broxburn in 1600 by Sir Richard Cockburn of Clerkington, Keeper of the Privy Seal of Scotland, almost certainly after Broxburn, East Lothian.

In 1636, Kirkhill house was granted to Ludovic Stewart, advocate. The house and surrounding land eventually passed to David Erskine, 11th Earl of Buchan, where the house was extensive remodelled in 1770/1771. It then passed to his nephew, the 12th Earl who was buried in St John's Church nearby. The house still exists today in Broxburn and is Category B listed.

== Economy ==
=== Past ===
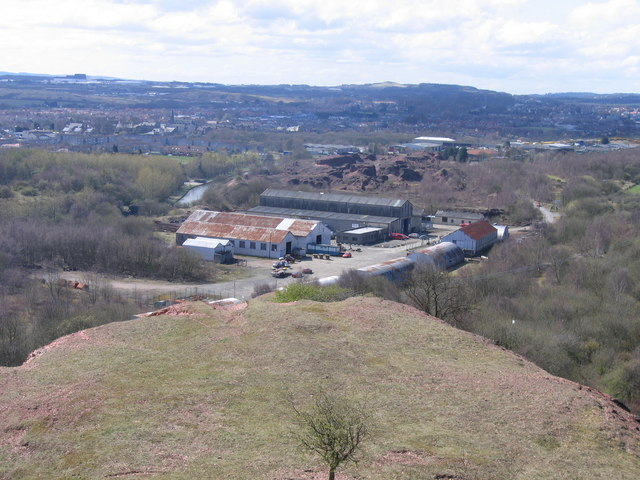
Former Broxburn shale oil works, taken from the top of the bing of spoil from the works. The surviving buildings of the works, now known as Albyn Industrial Estate, are in the middle of the picture. The villages of Broxburn and, to the right, Uphall are beyond and Livingston is visible on the skyline.

Broxburn remained an agricultural community until the development of the oil shale industry in the area during the second half of the nineteenth century. This brought in a rapid influx of workers, greatly expanding the local population. Broxburn is still known for its association with the industry, pioneered by the inventor and industrialist James Young. Many shale spoil tips, known as bings, are still in evidence around the town.

Up until its closure in 2013, Hall's of Broxburn, a food manufacturer, employed around 1,700 employees at its meat processing plant to the east of the town. At the time of closure, it was the largest, single employer in Broxburn. The large building was demolished in 2014.

=== The Shale Bings ===
The 3 Broxburn Bings (Greendikes Bing, Albion Oil Works Bing and Hopetoun Bing) reside on the north east of Broxburn starting from behind the East Mains Industrial estate. The nearby Niddry Bing resides near the village of Winchburgh. The largest of the three Bings is the Greendykes Bing which when scaled provides excellent views of the whole area. The Bings were created by large piles of spoil from the shale mines being dumped on top of each over to form the Bings.

=== Present ===
Broxburn now has two separate industrial areas, the Greendykes Industrial Estate and the East Mains Industrial Estate, which provide employment for local people. The largest employers are Campbells Prime Meat Limited, Glenmorangie and Broxburn Bottlers Limited (part of Ian Macleod Distillers Ltd). James Ritchie & Son is a firm of clockmakers located in Broxburn that was established in 1809.

== Governance ==
Broxburn lies in the Livingston constituency of the British Parliament and the Almond Valley constituency of the Scottish Parliament. It is also covered by the Central Scotland and Lothians West electoral region which gives the area seven additional MSPs.

Before Brexit, it was part of the Scotland European Parliament constituency.

For local government purposes Broxburn forms part of the 2nd ward of West Lothian Council, Broxburn, Uphall and Winchburgh, which also includes the nearby villages of Uphall and Winchburgh.

== Community facilities ==
The Strathbrock Partnership Centre is a local community facility that contains a medical centre, library, community museum and community centre. The library, formerly known as the Broxburn library was renamed the Lex Davidson Library in 2022 in honour of a local councillor who served the community for 25 years.

The local hospital is St. John's Hospital at Howden in Livingston.

== Transport ==
The A89 road passes along the southern edge of Broxburn. The A899 road passes directly through the centre of Broxburn where it is known as East and West Main Street. The nearest motorway is the M8. Broxburn is served by multiple bus services operated by McGill's Scotland East, Lothian Country and E&M Horseburgh. SD Travel operates one twice-a-day service 16 between Livingston Centre and Western General Hospital in the northwestern tip of Edinburgh via Broxburn, Whinchburgh, and Kirkliston, and HcL, a small mobility company based in the county, operates a local town service 2A and 2B between Broxburn and Uphall and within Broxburn itself.

Lothian Country operates services:

- 72 - Fauldhouse - Whitburn - Livingston - Broxburn - Winchburgh - Kirkliston
- X18 - Edinburgh - Ratho Station - Broxburn - Uphall - Bathgate - Armadale - Whitburn
- N18 - Edinburgh - Ratho Station - Broxburn - Uphall - Bathgate (Weekend Night Service)
- N43 - Edinburgh - Queensferry - Kirkliston - Broxburn - Dechmont (Night Service)

=== Railway ===
Broxburn has regular links to Edinburgh, Livingston, Linlithgow and Edinburgh Airport. The nearest railway station is at Uphall Station providing links to Edinburgh, Livingston, Bathgate, Airdrie and Glasgow.

=== Canal ===
The Union Canal passes through Broxburn. It no longer operates as a transport link, but is now used for fishing, magnet fishing and some leisure boating. It has a towpath previously used by the horses which drew canal barges and which is now used as a footpath, the footpaths are popular places for dog walkers, bikers, runners and walkers.

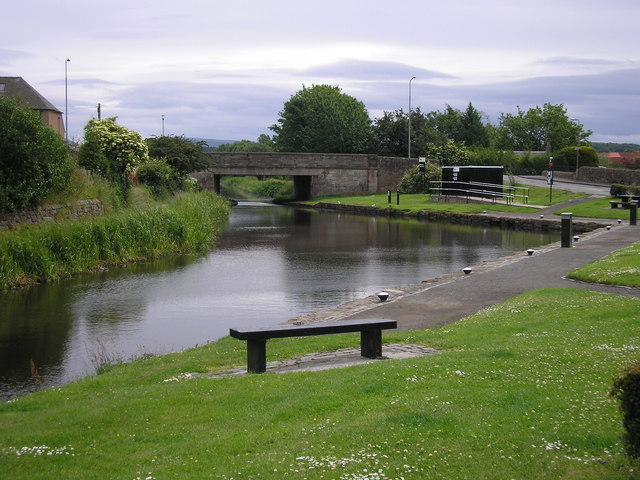
The Union Canal at Broxburn, looking west

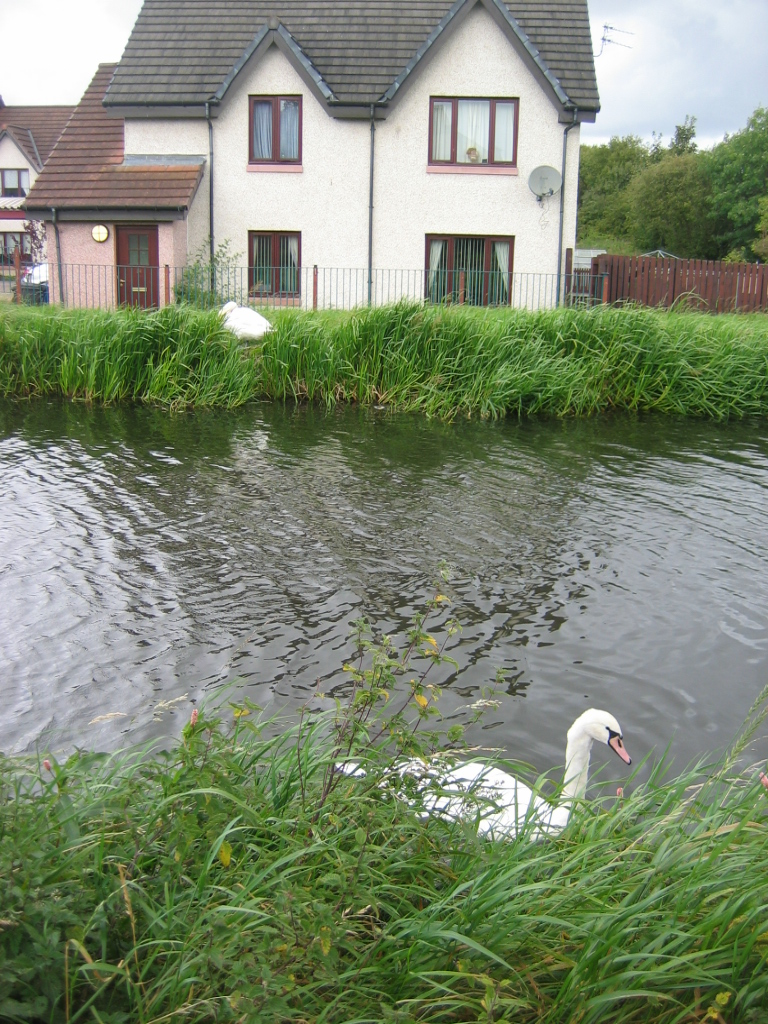
Union Canal

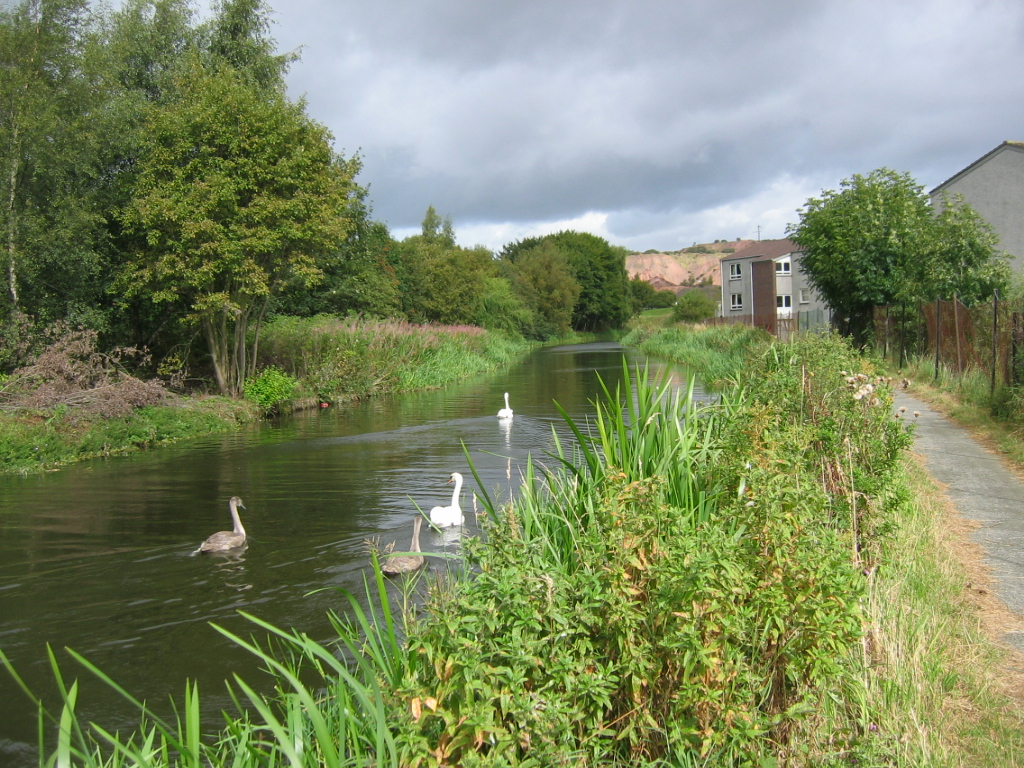
Swans on the canal

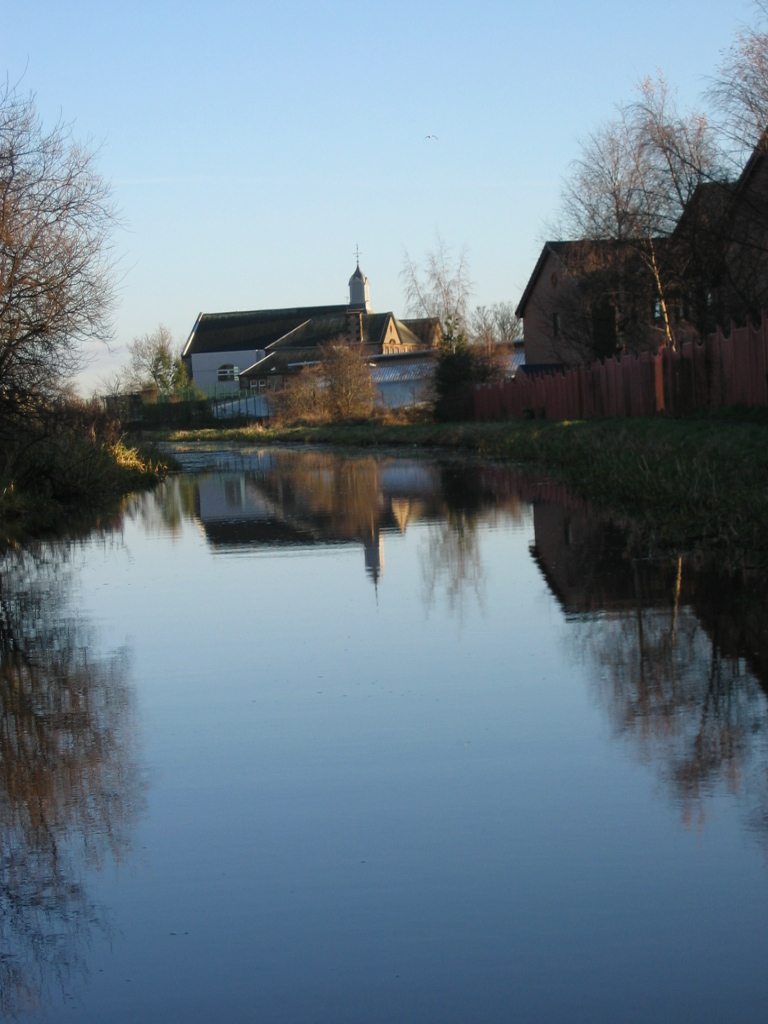
Between Bridges 26 and 27

== Education ==
Broxburn has four schools, all state-funded, Broxburn Primary, Kirkhill Primary, St. Nicholas Roman Catholic Primary and Broxburn Academy.

== Religious sites ==
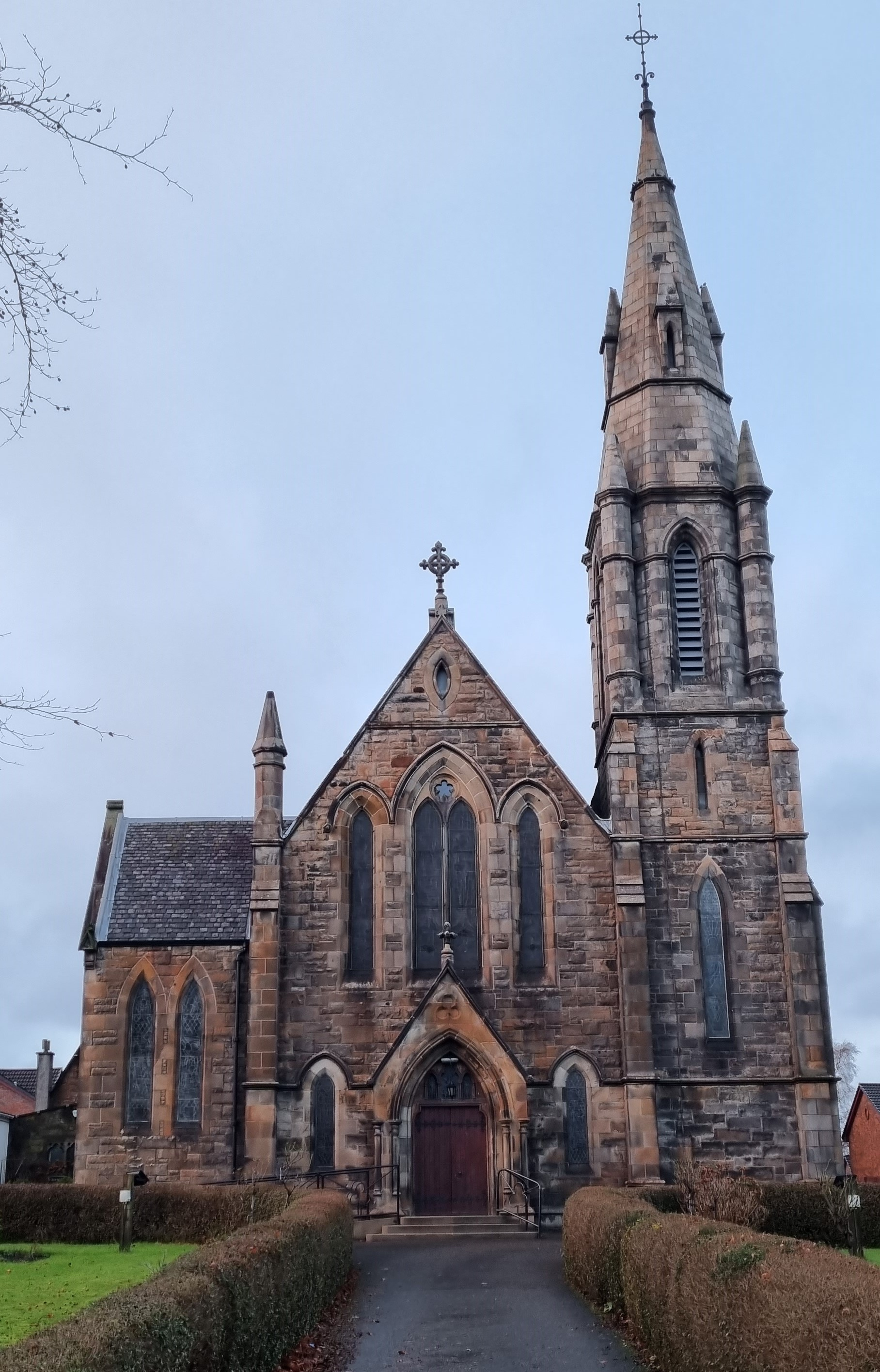
St John Cantius and St Nicholas Catholic Church

Broxburn has six churches.

The church of St John Cantius and St Nicholas Catholic Church is a Roman Catholic church. The church is Category B listed. It was built in 1880 in the Early English style to a design by Shiells & Thomson, the church is notable for containing a 15th/16th-century font from the medieval church excavated at Kirkhill. The original church high altar, in Caen stone and marble by Pugin & Pugin, has been replaced with a modern reredos. Adjacent to the church is a hall dating to 1936 (now used by a local scout group) and a memorial chapel for Henry Erskine, 12th Earl of Buchan built in 1857, who lived nearby at Kirkhill House.

The Broxburn Parish Church was built in 1880 to a French Gothic design by Hippolyte Blanc. It provides Church of Scotland services.

The St Nicholas United Free Church of Scotland was built in 1890 in the Gothic style to a design by James Graham Fairley.

Other smaller churches in the town include the New Life Christian Fellowship Broxburn in Strathbrock Community Centre, the Broxburn Baptist Church, and the Grace Community Church. There are also some other religious groups active in the town, including Jehovah's Witnesses and several evangelical Christian organisations.

== Sports ==
Broxburn is home to the football club Broxburn Athletic, who play in the Scottish Lowland League. There are sports and health facilities publicly available, including a sports centre, library, and bowling clubs. The Binny Golf Club is located on the Binny Estate.

A motorcycle dirt track was built at The Sports Park in 1928 and a few demonstration events were staged to show off the new sport to football fans. Due to Broxburn's proximity to Edinburgh, it was not licensed. Another demonstration event at a motorcycle club event in 1929 ended after both riders crashed.

== Notable residents ==
- David Erskine and Henry Erskine, the 11th and 12th Earls of Buchan
- James Anderson (Paralympian swimmer)
- Charles Benham (cricketer)
- Mark Burchill (footballer)
- Bill Bann (footballer)
- James Baird (footballer)
- Michael Caton-Jones, (film director)
- Colin Fleming (tennis player)
- David Fleming (cricketer)
- Gavin Hamilton (cricketer)
- Liam Henderson (footballer)
- John Kerr (figure skater)
- Shelley Kerr (football manager)
- Stephen Robson (Bishop)
- Alexander Steuart (clock and instrument-maker)

== Bibliography ==
- Canule, Canule, Birnin Bricht— by David Kerr, 2005
- Discovering West Lothian by William F. Hendrie, John Donald Publishers Ltd, Edinburgh, 1986
- A History of Broxburn by Peter Caldwell
- Strathbrock Area Guide prepared and published by Uphall Community Council with assistance from Broxburn Community Council and Ecclesmachan & Threemiletown Community Council
