= Lithgow (surname) =

Lithgow is a surname originating from Scottish as a habitational name from Linlithgow, between Edinburgh and Falkirk, which was probably named with British words related to modern Welsh llyn ‘lake’, ‘pool’ + llaith ‘damp’ + cau ‘hollow’. In the 13th and 14th centuries the name appears both with and without the first syllable. Originally, Lithgow was the name of the settlement and Linlithgow that of the lake. Lithgow was associated by folk etymology with Gaelic liath ‘gray’ + cu ‘dog’, and such a figure appears on the medieval borough seal. The surname is well represented in the Dominican Republic, South Africa, Australia, New Zealand, the United States, and the UK.

Notable people with the surname include:

== People ==
- Alan Lithgow (born 1988), Scottish football player
- Alex Lithgow (1870–1929), composer (marches)/musician/conductor, a Tasmanian Australian, formerly of Invercargill, New Zealand
- Arthur Lithgow (1915–2004), American-Dominican film director
- Bert Lithgow (1881–1951), Australian rules footballer
- Ian Lithgow (born 1972), American actor
- James Lithgow (disambiguation), multiple people
- John Lithgow (born 1945), American actor
- John Lithgow (disambiguation), multiple people
- Mike Lithgow (1920–1963), British aviator
- Samuel Lithgow (1860–1937), British solicitor
- William Lithgow (disambiguation), multiple people
