= Lithgow =

Lithgow may refer to:

- Lithgow, New South Wales, a town in the Central Tablelands of New South Wales, Australia
- City of Lithgow, an Australian local government area
- Lithgow (surname), a surname of Scottish origin
- Lithgow, New York, a hamlet in Dutchess County, New York, United States

== See also ==
- Lithgows, a Scottish company
- Lythgoe, a surname
