= Beecraigs =

Country park in West Lothian

Coordinates: 55.950°N 3.597°W

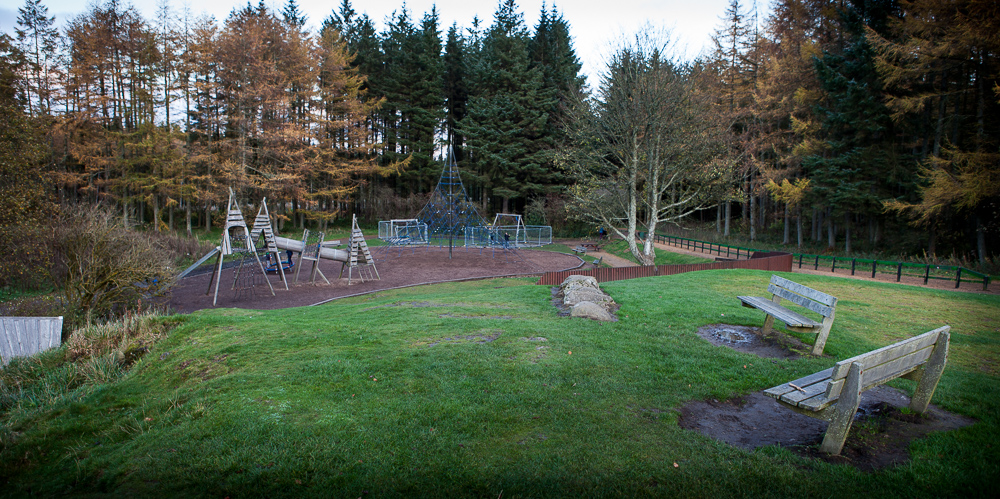
Beecraigs Adventure Playground

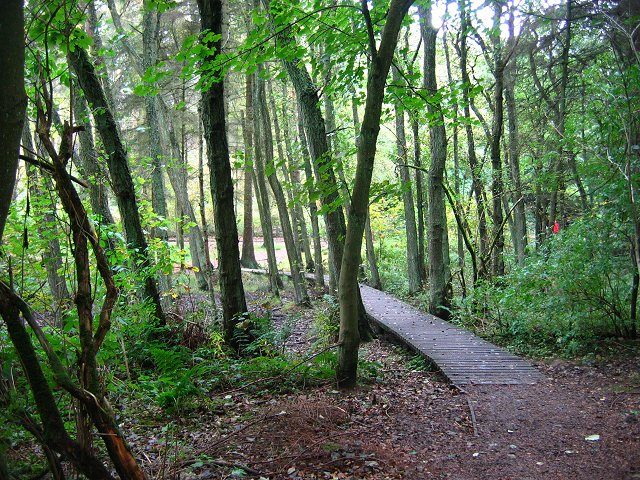
Path crossing a burn and a marsh near Beecraigs Reservoir, within Beecraigs Country Park

Beecraigs is a country park in West Lothian, approximately 2 miles (3.2 km) south of the town of Linlithgow and 3 miles (4.8 km) north-east of Bathgate and is a 4 star Visitor Attraction (Visitscotland). The Park comprises around 913 acres (369 ha) of upland forest, woodland and open country, and offers a range of amenities including walks & trails, play area, skills area & mountain bike trails, BBQ hire, caravan & camping site including 2 lodges (4 star Touring Park by VisitScotland and 4 pennant Gold award by the AA), Countryside Ranger Service, animal attraction (Red Deer, Highland Cattle, Belted Galloway Cattle, Hebridean/North Ronaldsay/Shetland Sheep), fly fishery, Visitor Centre and Cafe. In 2010 prehistoric remains were uncovered on the site of the current visitor centre. To the west of the country park is privately owned Cockleroy Hill (278 metres (912 ft)), which is topped by the remains of a prehistoric hillfort.

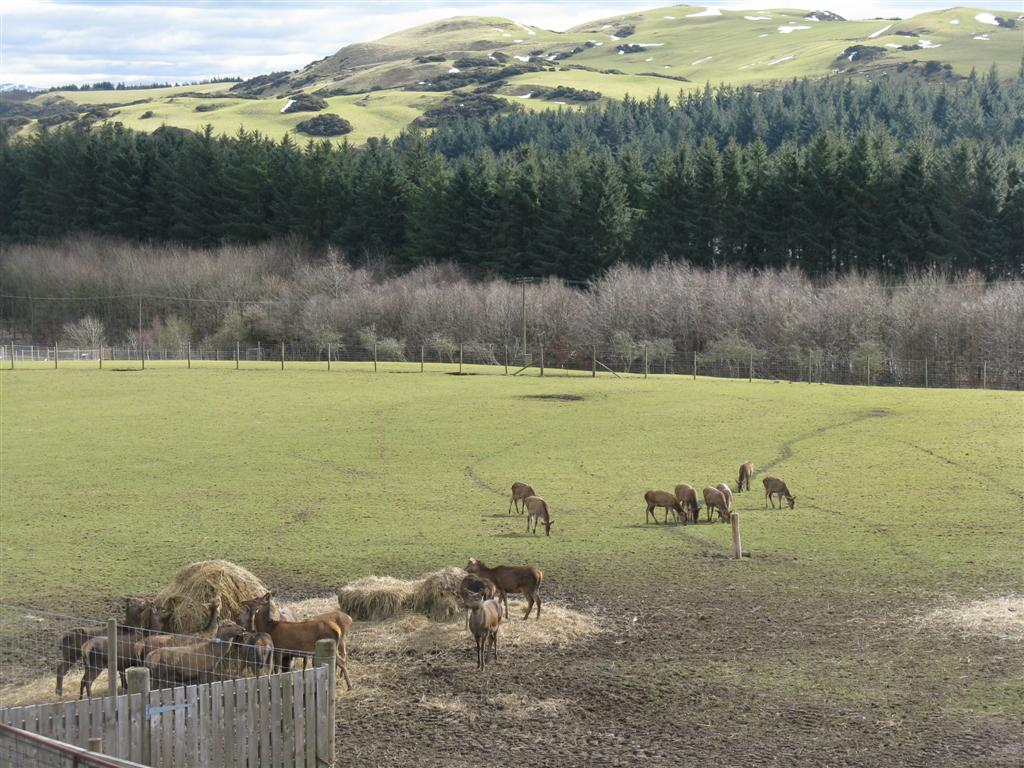
Deer at Beecraigs

== Location ==
A major attraction of Beecraigs is its location high on the hills above the towns of Bathgate and Linlithgow which afford impressive views of the surrounding countryside, including the Forth Valley, Linlithgow Loch, Binny Craig and Palace, the three Forth Bridges and the Pentland Hills. The Park does not lie on any major routes, and is 4 miles (6.4 km) from the M9 and 5 miles (8.0 km) from the M8 motorways.

== Reservoir ==
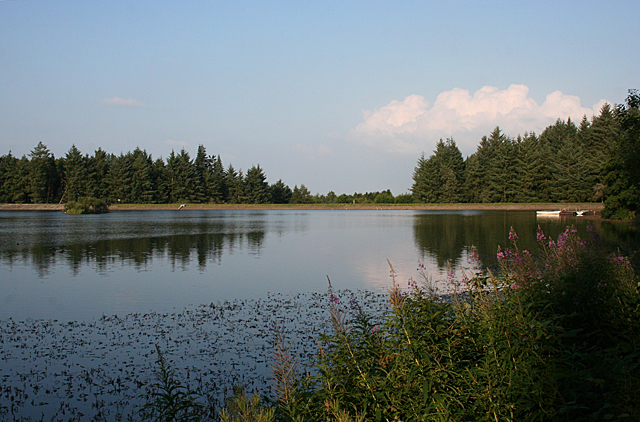
Beecraigs Loch

The reservoir, now known as Beecraigs Loch, was built by German Prisoners of War. They were based in a work camp and had been sent from Stobs Camp near Hawick. Clay and stone was used to build the dam wall, this stone was quarried from Riccarton Hill and brought down the slopes to the site using a winch-powered railway. By 1918 the 8 hectare reservoir, holding 82 million gallons of water, began serving as a local water supply and continued to do so for 55 years.

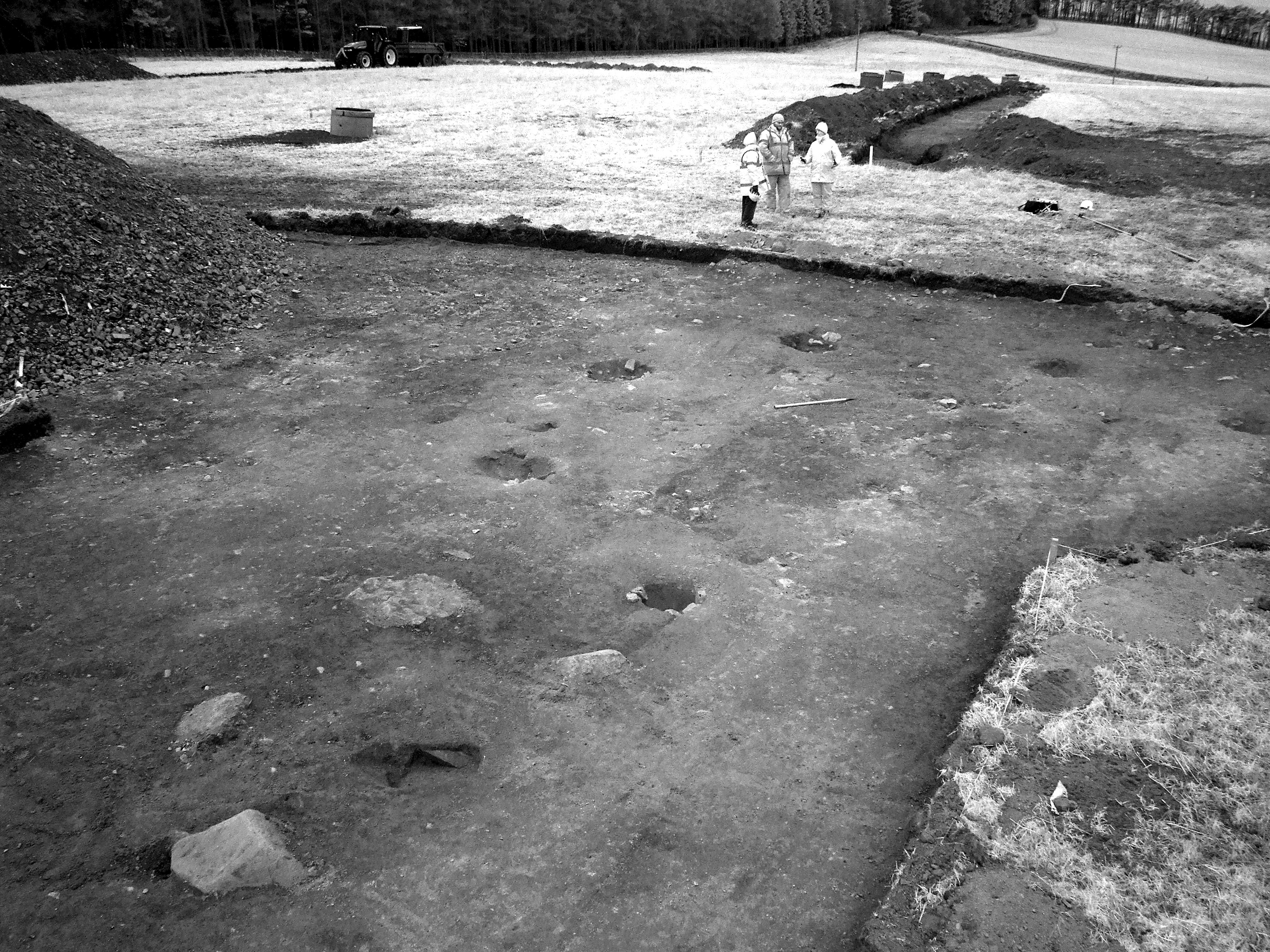
The site of a prehistoric timber circle at Beecraigs.
