= Linlithgow Folk Festival =

Folk music festival in Scotland

Linlithgow Folk Festival is an annual folk music festival held in Linlithgow, West Lothian, Scotland.

The first festival was held in 1999. Normally held on the second full weekend of September, it consists of a combination of sessions in local pubs and bars and organised musical events. These include paying and free concerts, workshops, and an increasing number of events in local venues, at the town's canal basin and on canal boats, in the local museum, local churches and sometimes in Linlithgow Palace.

The Festival Association has brought big names to the town in recent years, including Tom Paxton, Eric Bogle and Ralph McTell.

The Linlithgow Folk Festival Association has promoted interest in Glaswegian songwriter and performer Matt McGinn, and puts on an annual 'Matt McGinn night' at the beginning of March.
