= Cockleroi =

Hill in Scotland

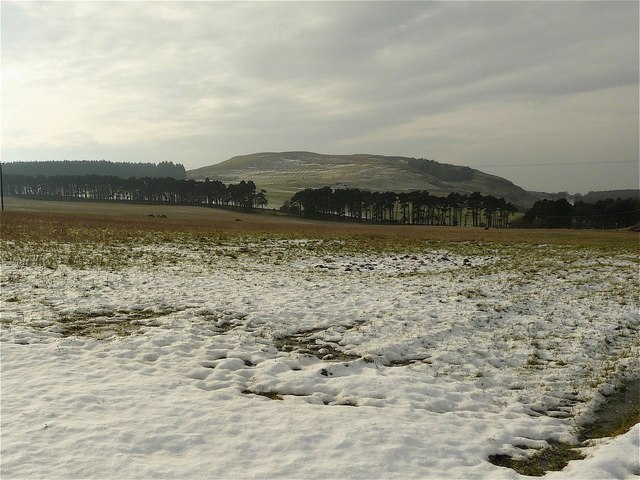
- Pathway to Cockleroi

Highest point
- Elevation: 278 m (912 ft)
- Prominence: 59
- Coordinates: 55.95163°N 3.61988°W

Geography
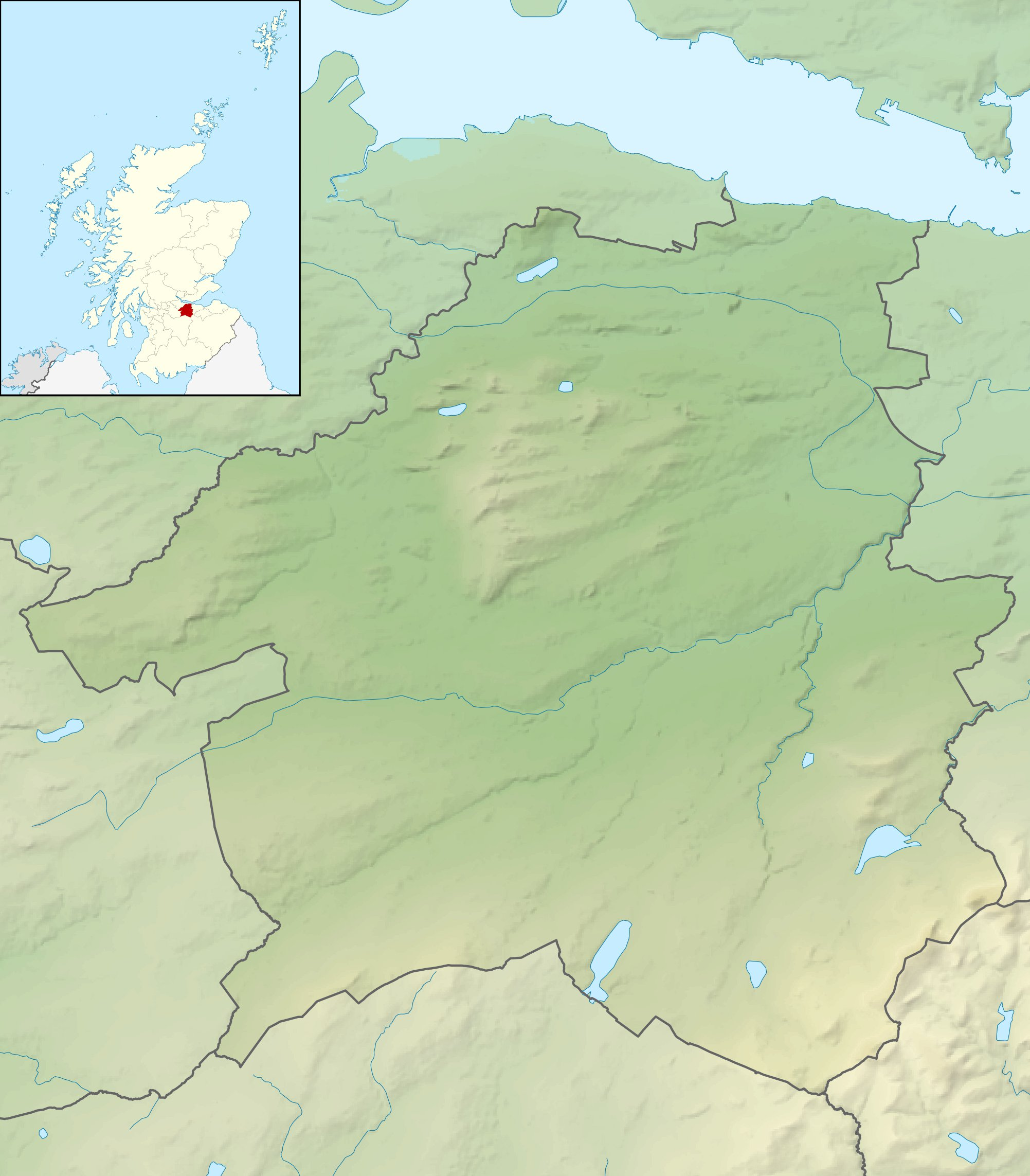
- Location within West Lothian
- Location: West Lothian, Scotland, United Kingdom

Cockleroi or Cockleroy is a prominent hill in Scotland. It is Linlithgow's local hill. On its top there are some remains of an Iron Age's hill fort.

== Etymology ==
There are multiple explanations for the name Cockleroi. The most phonetically plausible is derivation from Gaelic *cochull-ruadh meaning "red cap, hood or mantle". Less convincing Gaelic derivations are *cachaileth ruadh, "red gate", *cuchailte ruadh, "red residence, seat". The name may be Brittonic and derived from *cloc-erjo- (from *clog, "rock, crag, steep cliff", Welsh clegyr), suffixed with rūδ, "red" (Welsh rhudd), but this requires double metathesis and unexplained reversion of -e- to –o-.

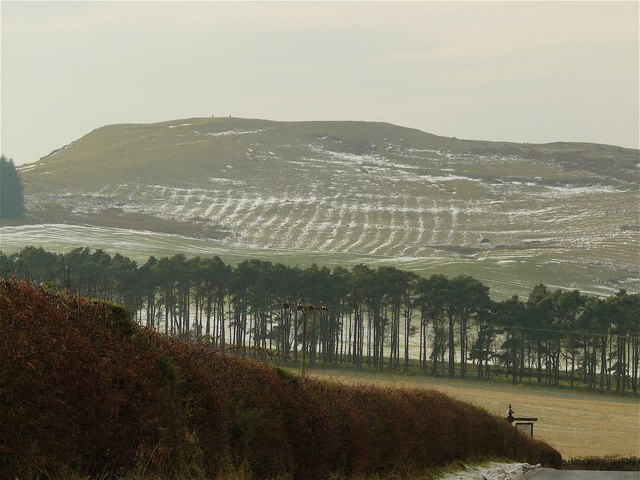
Rigs on Cockleroi

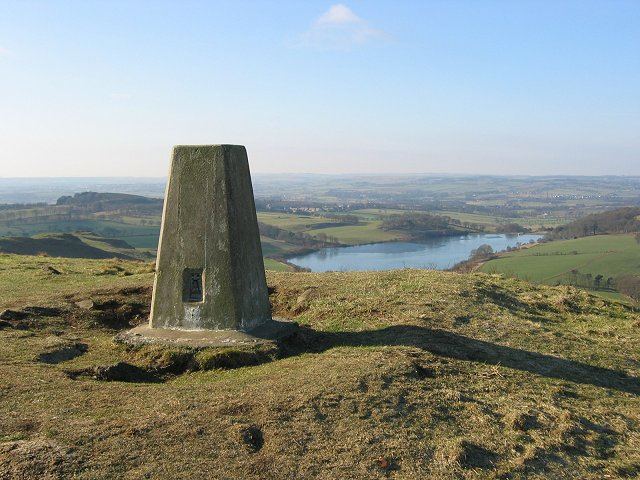
Summit of Cockleroy
