= Lythgoe =

Lythgoe is a surname. Notable people with the surname include:

- Albert Lythgoe (1868–1934), archaeologist and curator of the Metropolitan Museum of Art
- Alf Lythgoe (1907–1967), British footballer
- Bonnie Lythgoe (born c. 1950), British dancer and theatre producer & director
- Clive Lythgoe (1927–2006), British musician
- David Lythgoe (born c. 1880), American actor
- Ian G. Lythgoe (1914–2000), New Zealand accountant and public administrator
- Nigel Lythgoe (born 1949), British dancer, director & producer
- Simon Lythgoe (born late 20th century), British-born film technician and producer

== See also ==
- Mary Lythgoe Bradford (1930-2022), American writer
- Lithgow (surname)
