= Linlithgow =

Town in Scotland

Linlithgow: Scottish Gaelic: Gleann Iucha; Scots: Lithgae
- Town
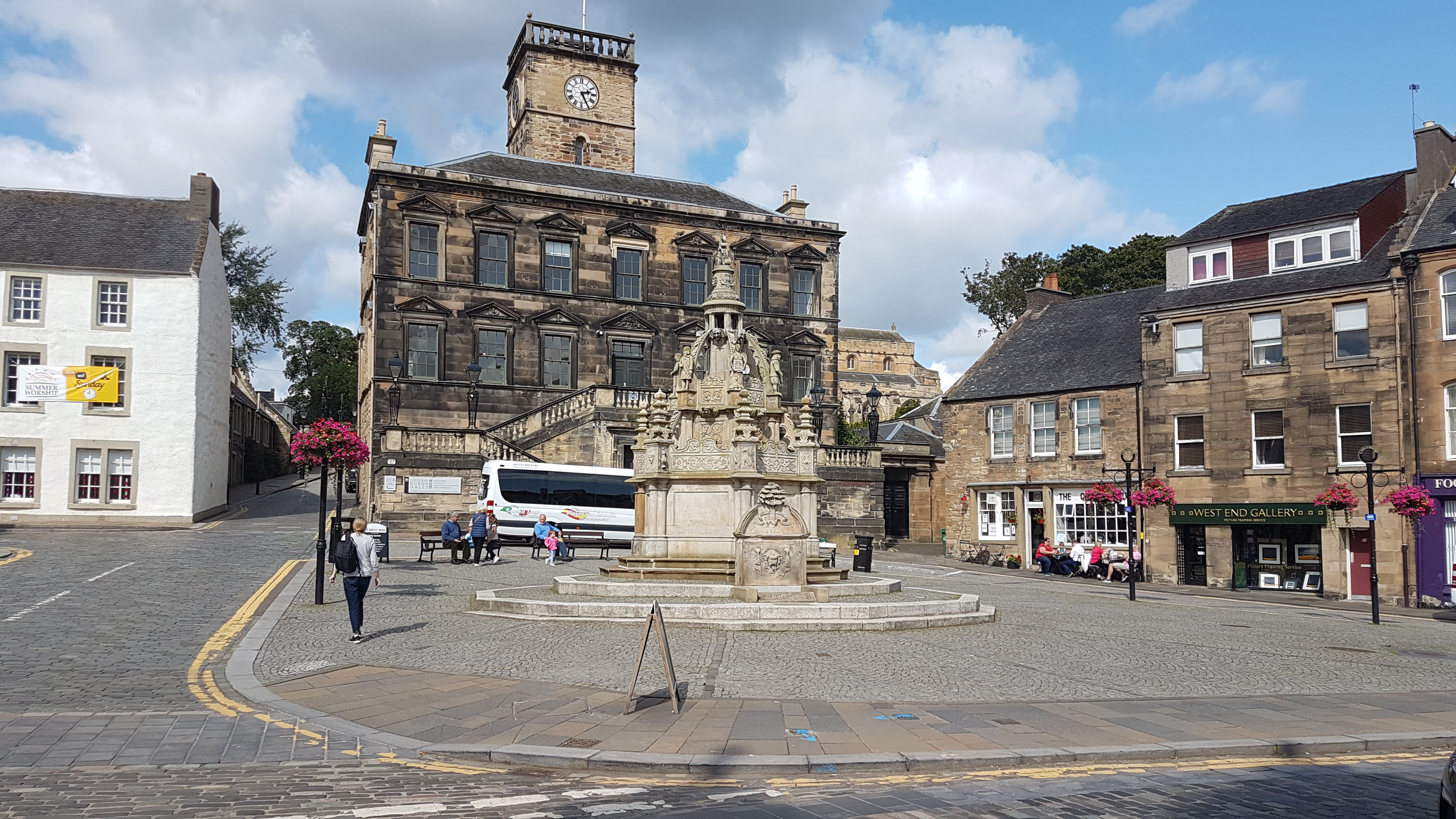
- Linlithgow Town Centre, showing the Burgh Halls (background) and the Cross Well (foreground), August 2018

- Location within West Lothian
- Population: 12,517 (2022)
- OS grid reference: NS996774
- Council area: West Lothian
- Lieutenancy area: West Lothian
- Country: Scotland
- Sovereign state: United Kingdom
- Post town: LINLITHGOW
- Postcode district: EH49
- Dialling code: 01506
- Police: Scotland
- Fire: Scottish
- Ambulance: Scottish
- UK Parliament: Bathgate and Linlithgow
- Scottish Parliament: Falkirk East and Linlithgow

Linlithgow (/lɪnˈlɪθɡoʊ/ lin-LITH-goh; Scots: Lithgae; Scottish Gaelic: Gleann Iucha) is a town and historic royal burgh in West Lothian, Scotland. It was historically West Lothian's county town, reflected in the county's historical name of Linlithgowshire. An ancient town, it lies in the Central Belt on a historic route between Edinburgh and Falkirk beside Linlithgow Loch. The town is situated approximately 20 miles (32 km) west of Edinburgh. In 2022, the population of Linlithgow was 12,517, while the Linlithgow ward (which includes the town and greater area) had a population of 16,499 in 2019.

During the medieval period, the town grew in prominence as a royal burgh and residence around Linlithgow Palace. In later centuries, Linlithgow became a centre of industry in leather making and other materials, before developing rapidly in the Victorian era with the opening of the Union Canal in the 1820s and the arrival of the railway in 1842. Linlithgow was the former county town of the county but the Council now resides in nearby Livingston. Today Linlithgow has less industry and the economy of the town centre is focused on hospitality, heritage and tourism services. Linlithgow's patron saint is Saint Michael and its motto is St. Michael is kind to strangers. A statue of the saint holding the burgh coat of arms stands on the High Street.

== History ==
=== Etymology ===
The name Linlithgow comes from the Old Welsh lynn llaith cau meaning "lake in the moist hollow". Originally "Linlithgow" referred to the loch itself, the town being known as just "Lithgow" (hence the common surname). Folk etymology associated this name with the Gaelic liath-chù meaning "grey dog", likely the origin of the black bitch on the burgh arms. Evidence of Bronze Age and Iron Age settlements has been found around Linlithgow, in the form of Crannogs in Linlithgow Loch.

=== Medieval history ===
Linlithgow gained its royal status as a burgh in 1388 under a charter from Robert II of Scotland. Linlithgow developed in the Middle Ages as a royal residence for Scottish Kings on the raised hill beside the Loch, as the site was a logical stop between Edinburgh to the east and Stirling to the West. Linlithgow Palace remains the chief historic attraction of the town. The present palace was started (on an older site) in 1424 by James I of Scotland. It was attacked by Oliver Cromwell in 1650 and later burnt in 1746, and, whilst unroofed, it is still largely complete in terms of its apartments, though very few of the original furnishings survived. The palace was the birthplace of James V and Mary, Queen of Scots, and has been described as Scotland's finest surviving late medieval secular building. In the courtyard of the Palace, an elaborately carved hexagonal fountain and well survives.

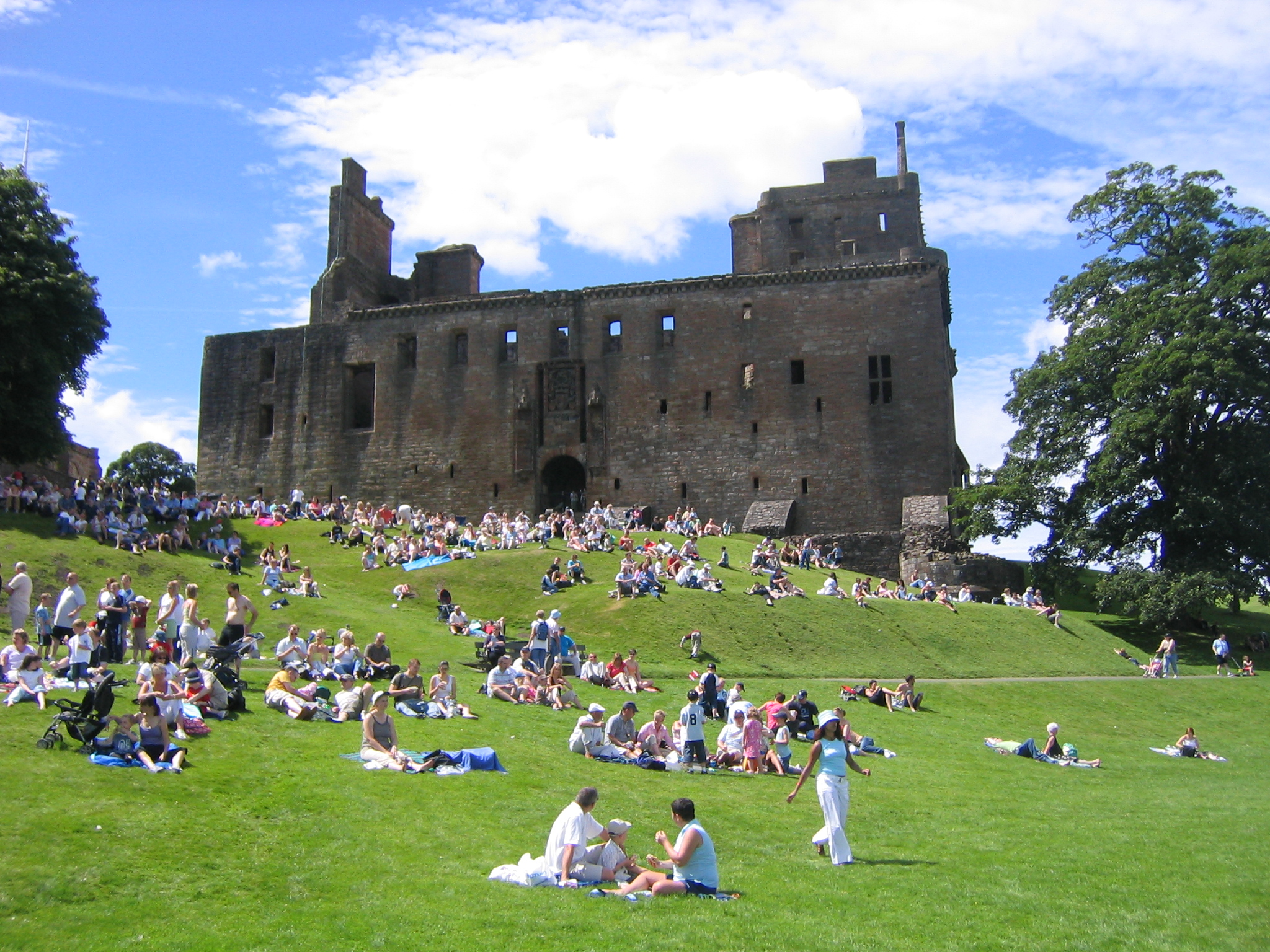
Linlithgow Palace from the public park surrounding it, known as The Peel (August 2005)

Besides the palace, a second attraction, standing adjacent, is the primarily 15th century construction of St. Michael's Church. Its western tower originally had a distinctive stone crown spire, of the type seen also on St Giles Cathedral in Edinburgh, and Newcastle Cathedral, but it was damaged in a storm in 1768 then removed in 1821. In 1964 a controversial replacement spire in aluminium in a modern style by Geoffrey Clarke, representing Christ's crown of thorns, was added to the tower. The church was used in the early 17th century as host for the General Assembly of the Church of Scotland and one of the national covenants was signed within. The church was extensively altered and renovated in the 19th century, with James Gillespie Graham demolishing the chancel arch and added fake-masonry plaster vaults, and then later Honeyman and Keppie rebuilding the chancel arch and added a choir vestry.

A Carmelite Friary was located in the southern part of town from the 13th century until 1559, when it was destroyed during the Scottish Reformation. The grounds of the friary are split between a public park (Rosemount Park and Friar's Well) and a private woodland (Rosemount woods) and estate, occupied by a 19th-century villa, Nether Parkley.

The first murder using a firearm in Scotland took place in the High Street of the town on 23 January 1570 when James Stewart, 1st Earl of Moray was assassinated by James Hamilton of Bothwellhaugh, a supporter of Queen Mary. As Moray was passing in a cavalcade in the main street below, Hamilton fatally wounded him with a carbine shot from a window of his uncle Archbishop Hamilton's house.

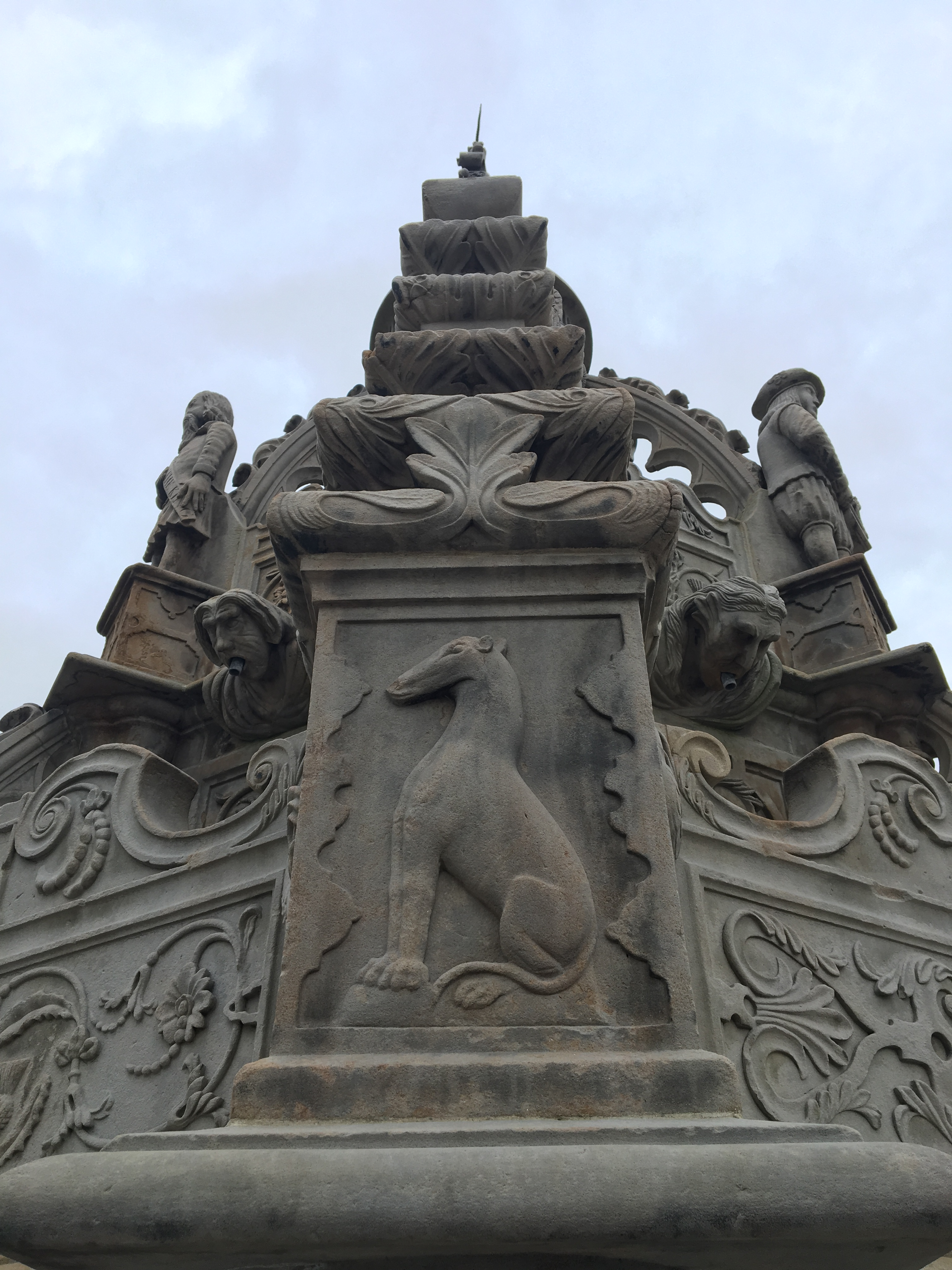
Cross Well, Linlithgow

Many historic buildings line the High Street that follows the original route from the East (High and Low Ports) and West (Ports) Gates. On the south side, ground levels rise and several historic wynds and closes, as found in Edinburgh, still exist. The most prominent historical space is the Kirkgate, a processional route to the palace from the High Street. This contains the Cross Well of 1807 (redesigned by James Haldane) which is said to be replica of its 1628 predecessor.

North of the well stands the former civic home of the Burgh Council, the Town House of 1668 which was created under the direction of the master mason John Smith and now forms part of the complex known as the Burgh Halls. This replaced a previous hall or Tolbooth demolished by Oliver Cromwell's army in 1650. Much of its original interior was removed in a modernisation project of 1962. In June 1622 Katherine Rannald (alias Broun) from Kilpunt and her daughter Barbara Home (alias Winzet) were imprisoned in the Tolbooth on suspicion of witchcraft.

Linlithgow was also the site of the Battle of Linlithgow Bridge at the western edge of the town. The bridge no longer stands. The roadway to Linlithgow over the River Avon is described by scholars as a lifted road.

By 1799, Linlithgow was described as a large town with about 2300 inhabitants, whose primary industries included the tanning of leather, refining cotton cloth, the making of Tambour lace and Stockings, and shoemaking, as well as acting as a market town for the surrounding agriculture. From the 17th until the late 19th century, the two largest industries in Linlithgow were leathermaking and shoemaking.

=== Modern history ===
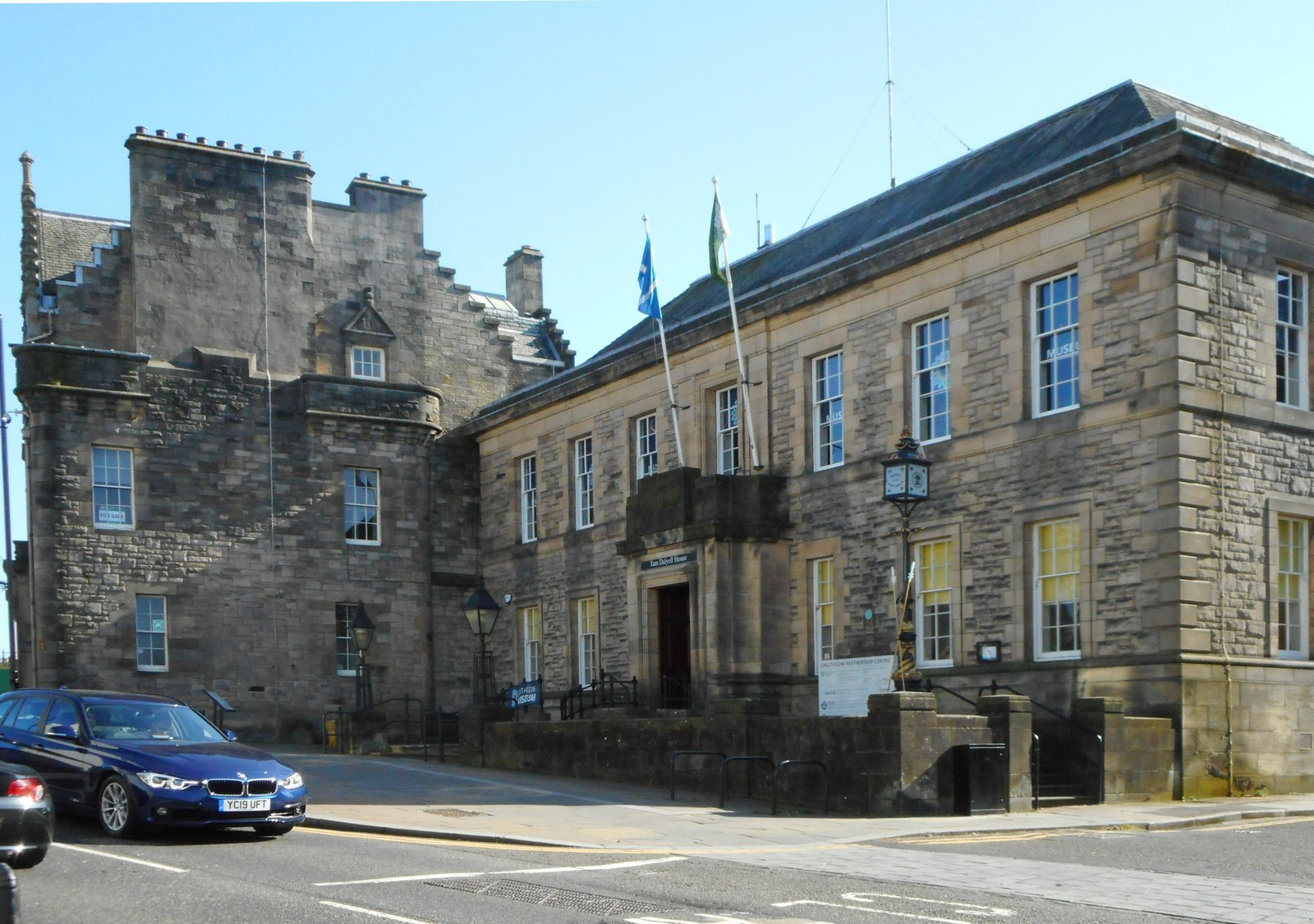
County Buildings: now home to the Linlithgow Partnership Centre

In 1847, a pharmacist in the town, David Waldie is credited as being the first to produce a sample of chloroform for medical use, presenting it to James Young Simpson who later tested it and had it produced again on his return to Edinburgh, popularising its use as an anesthetic in medicine. In the mid 20th century, the chemists became a restaurant and is now the Four Mary's pub (a plaque records the history).

In December 1887 a new events venue was completed in a castle style with turrets and named the Victoria Hall. In 1956, the Hall was sold for use as a Ritz cinema and later was used as a theatre, before falling out of use in the 21st century and subsequently being demolished, despite a public effort to save the facade. Other prominent Victorian buildings in the town include the turreted Royal Bank (erected in 1959), the Star And Garter Hotel (converted in 1847) and the Scots revival styled St. Michael's Hotel (1886).

Animal glue was produced at the Gowanstanks works for many years, on the site now occupied by St. Josephs primary school. Linlithgow has been cited as the location of the first petrol pump in Scotland. A plaque on the High Street records that Scotland's first petrol pump was installed at a garage here in 1919. In 1940, the Neo-Georgian County Buildings were completed in the town and became the home of Linlithgowshire Council. They were later renamed as the Tam Dalyell House and are now the Linlithgow Partnership Centre, home to the town library and museum.

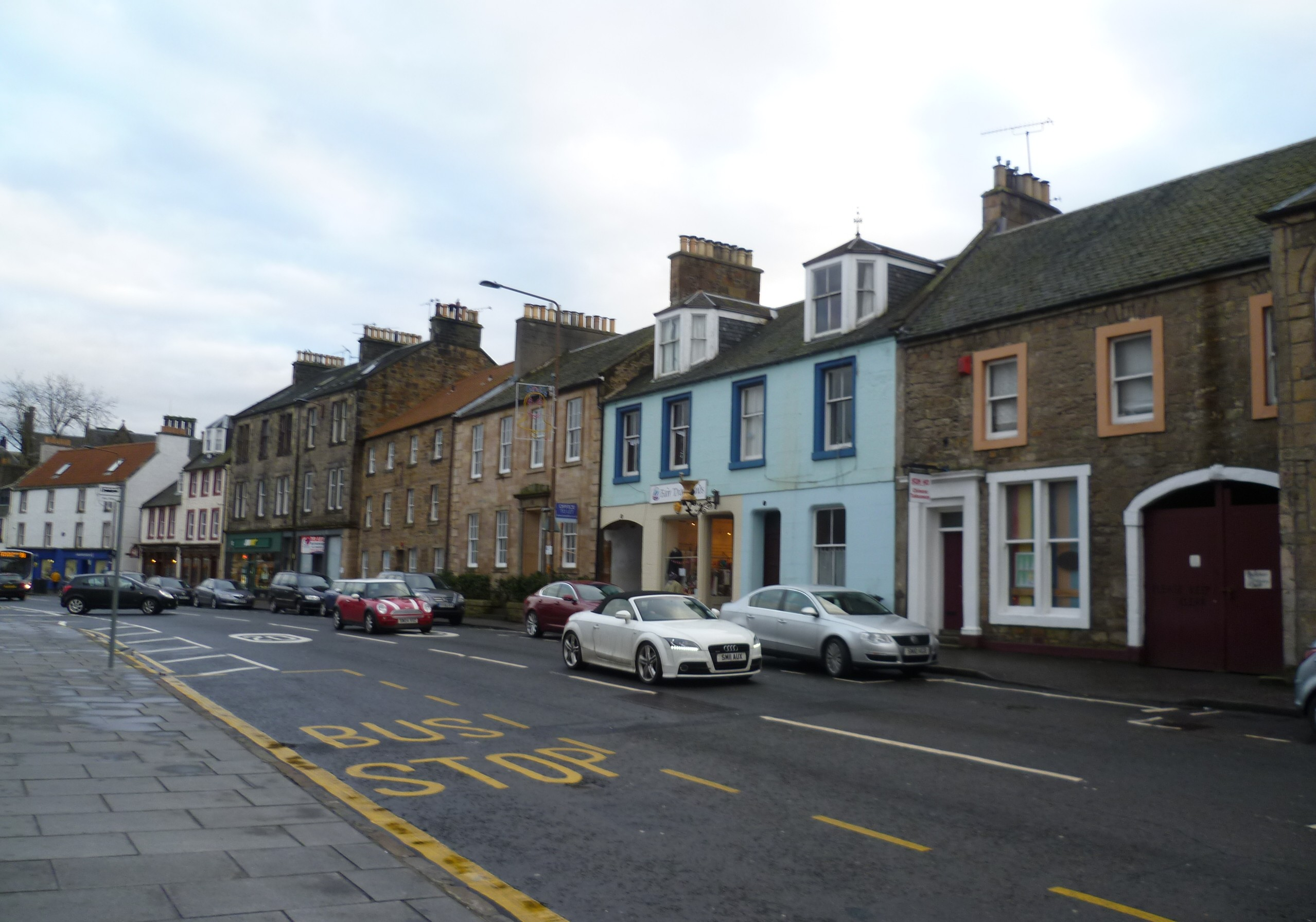
The south side of the High Street was spared the demolition inflicted upon the north side in the 1960s.

In 1967, two large tracts of land on the northern side of the High Street (with their associated pre 19th century buildings) were demolished and replaced by 90 flats, garages and public buildings (including a library and health centre) in a brutalist style project named the 'Vennel redevelopment'. The name Vennel coming from the term for a passageway between the gables of two buildings. While the development won a Saltire Housing award in 1969, it was and still remains controversial, especially as the style contrasts starkly with the character of other buildings in the town and significantly altered the street layout. After many decades of discussion, the partial demolition and redevelopment of the Vennel area was agreed by West Lothian Council, subject to consultation, which began in 2021.

The town has continued to grow, not only because of its transport links with Edinburgh, Glasgow and Stirling, but also because of the perceived quality of its schooling and local amenities. The town grew considerably during the 1990s with the completion of several housing developments on the east side of the town. Development in the town is carefully controlled, as it is now bounded by green belt to the south and east, the M9 to the north, the river Avon and county boundary to the West.

Following the formation of the Territorial Force the town was allocated, for recruiting, to the Lothians and Border Horse and 10th Battalion, Royal Scots. Today 1 SCOTS recruit from the area keeping the traditions of the area from the Royal Scots.

== Geography ==
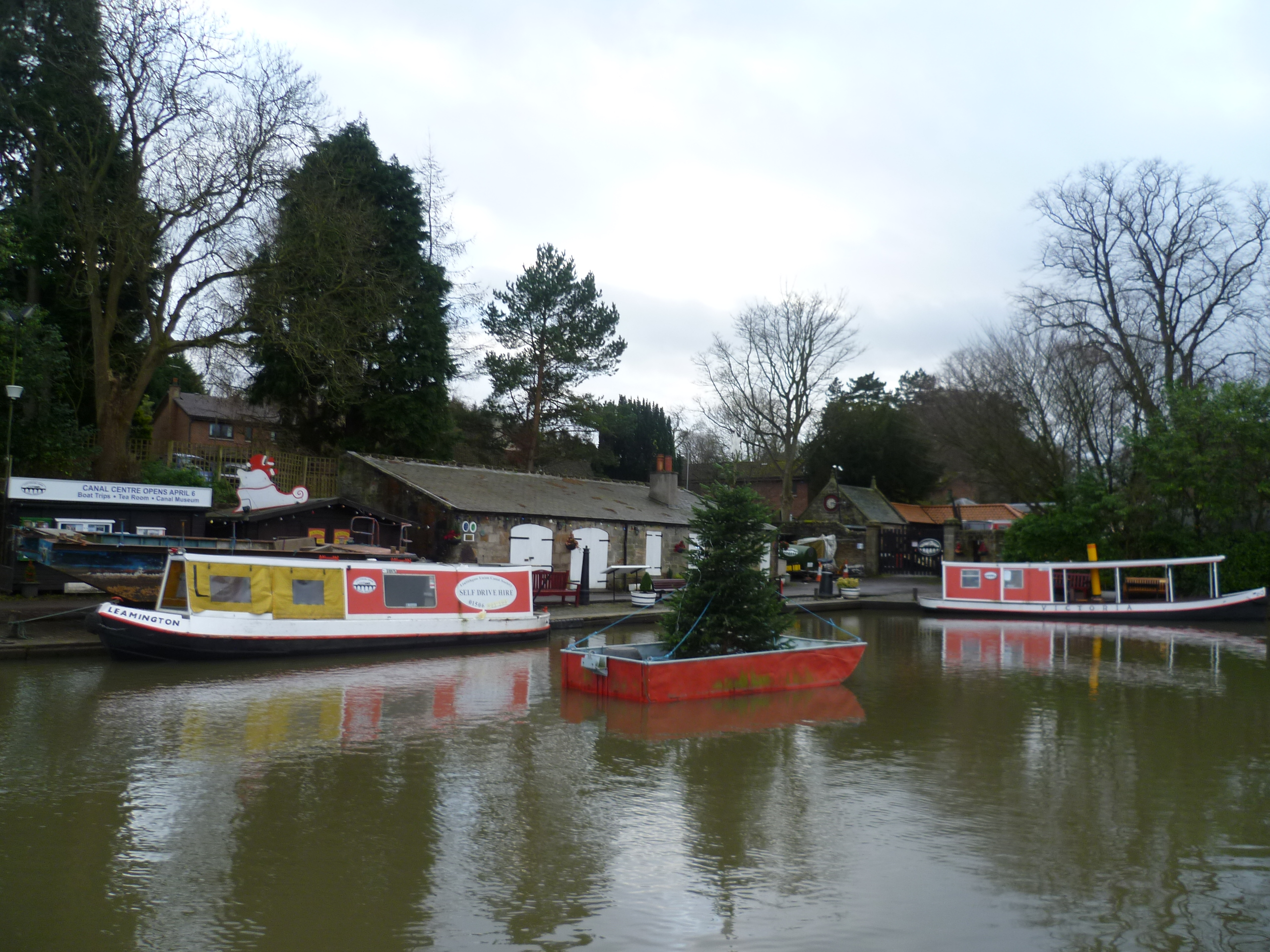
Linlithgow Canal Basin

Linlithgow is located in the north-east of West Lothian, close to the border with the Falkirk Council area (historically part of Stirlingshire). It lies 20 miles (32 km) west of Edinburgh along the main railway route to Glasgow. Before the construction of the M8 and M9 motorways and the opening of the Forth Road Bridge, the town lay on the main road from Edinburgh to Stirling, Perth and Inverness, while the canal system linked the burgh to Edinburgh and Glasgow. The nearby village of Blackness once served as the burgh's port. Linlithgow is overlooked by its local hill, Cockleroi.

The town has a generally east–west orientation and is centred on what used to be the main Edinburgh-Stirling road; this now forms the main thoroughfare called the High Street. Plots of farmed land, known as rigs, ran perpendicular to the High Street and comprised much of the town's development until the 19th century. Growth was restricted to the north by Linlithgow Loch, and by the steep hill to the south, but, in the late 19th and early 20th centuries, development began much further south of the High Street. In the late 20th century, demand for housing led to many residential developments much further south, as well as spreading into new areas. This southward development was bisected by the Union Canal and latterly by the main Edinburgh-Glasgow railway line, and today there are traffic problems because there are only three places in the town where each of these can be crossed.

To the west, Linlithgow Bridge used to be a somewhat distinct village with its own identity, but in the latter half of the 20th century it was enveloped in the expansion of the main town. Today the distinction between them is hard to make out.

== Governance ==
=== UK Parliament ===
In the Parliament of the United Kingdom at Westminster, Linlithgow has been represented as part of the Bathgate and Linlithgow constituency since 2024. Linlithgow was a safe Labour seat until the 2015 when sitting MP Michael Connarty was defeated by Martyn Day of the SNP. Day remained the MP until the 2024 election where he was defeated by Kirsteen Sullivan of the Labour and Co-operative Party.

=== Scottish Parliament ===
In the Scottish Parliament, Linlithgow is represented by the SNP's Fiona Hyslop, the Cabinet Secretary for Culture, Tourism and External Affairs. Prior to the 2011 Scottish Parliament election, the town was represented by Mary Mulligan of Labour. It is also part of the Lothian electoral region, which elected 3 Conservative, 2 Labour and 2 Green MSPs under the additional member system in 2016.

=== Council ===
At the county level, Linlithgow is represented locally under West Lothian Council. In both the 2012 and 2017 local elections, Linlithgow ward elected one Conservative, one Labour and one SNP councillor. In the 2022, Linlithgow ward elected one SNP, one Labour and one Liberal Democrat councillor, namely Pauline Orr, Tom Conn and Sally Pattle, respectively. 2022 was the first election which saw Linlithgow ward elect any female councillors to West Lothian Council.

At the local level, the Linlithgow and Linlithgow Bridge Community Council is the local Community council.

=== Coat of arms ===
Linlithgow's Black Bitch

The burgh's coat of arms features a black bitch chained to an oak tree on an island, and those born within the town are known as "black bitches". In his account of a tour of Scotland, published in 1679, an English gentleman, Thomas Kirk, described the arms of the town as "a black bitch tied to a tree, in a floating island. We enquired for a story about it, but could meet with none: their schoolmaster told us it proceeded from the name of the place. Linlithgow, in Erst [Gaelic], is thus explained: Lin signifies Lough; Lith, black; and Gow, a hound."

A more recently recorded legend relates that the bitch was a black greyhound whose master was sentenced to starve to death on an island in the loch. She used to swim from the town every day with food for him. When this was discovered she was chained to a tree on a different island to suffer the same fate as her master. The townspeople took the animal's loyalty and bravery as symbolic of their own.

== Economy ==
Linlithgow's rich history and central location make it a popular tourist destination, while many local people commute to Glasgow, Edinburgh or Stirling; this is made relatively easy by the town's railway station and its proximity to both the M8 and M9 motorways.

The town is served by four supermarkets and a retail park situated in Linlithgow Bridge. There are also a diverse range of local retailers in the High Street. In 2012, there were controversial proposals for a new retail and housing development to the east of the town which were opposed by several local groups. However, in November 2013, the planning application was rejected due to the effect it would have on the towns character.

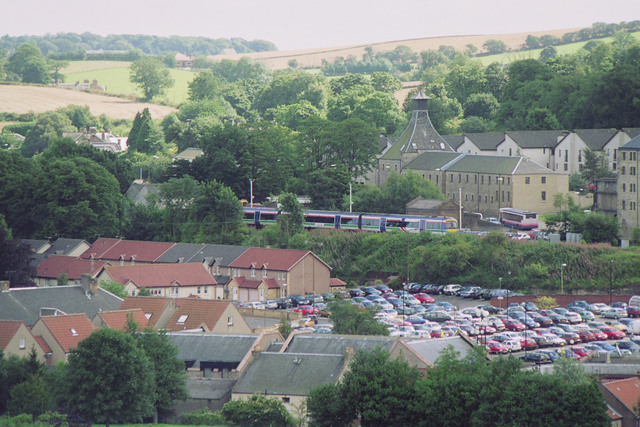
St. Magdalene's distillery in Linlithgow (in operation between 1798 and 1983).

Linlithgow is home to a major computing centre owned by Oracle and to the telecommunication company Calnex Solutions, founded in 2006 in the town and which floated on the AIM market in September 2020.

Former industries include the St. Magdalene's distillery, the Nobel explosives works, paper mills and many tanneries. The Regent Centre, now known as Nobel House, replaced the previous 1908 build Nobel Explosive Company Works Factory in 1983 and is home to a small shopping centre, with several shops and a bank.

== Culture and community ==
The Riding of the Marches, held in one form or another since the mid-16th century and nowadays celebrated on the first Tuesday after the second Thursday in June, involves young and old in the tradition of checking the burgh's perimeter, including the town's historic port of Blackness. Although today's activities are centred more on the colourful parades through the town that involve bands and floats decorated by local groups, the more ceremonial duties of the Marches are still performed, and a variety of local groups ensure that the traditions, old and new, are maintained.

There are many other events during the year such as the Children's Gala Day, the Linlithgow Folk Festival and a pre-Christmas Victorian Street Fayre, and since 2014, Party at the Palace which is a music festival held annually in August by the loch and has brought acts including Nile Rodgers, Kaiser Chiefs, Travis, Simple Minds, The Proclaimers, Texas and many others to play in the town. The Charlatans and Deacon Blue headlined Party at the Palace 2019. The sense of community is enhanced by many active local groups such as Linlithgow Amateur Musical Productions (LAMP), Lithca Lore, the Linlithgow Players and the 41 Club. The town also has its own weekly local newspaper, the Linlithgow Gazette.

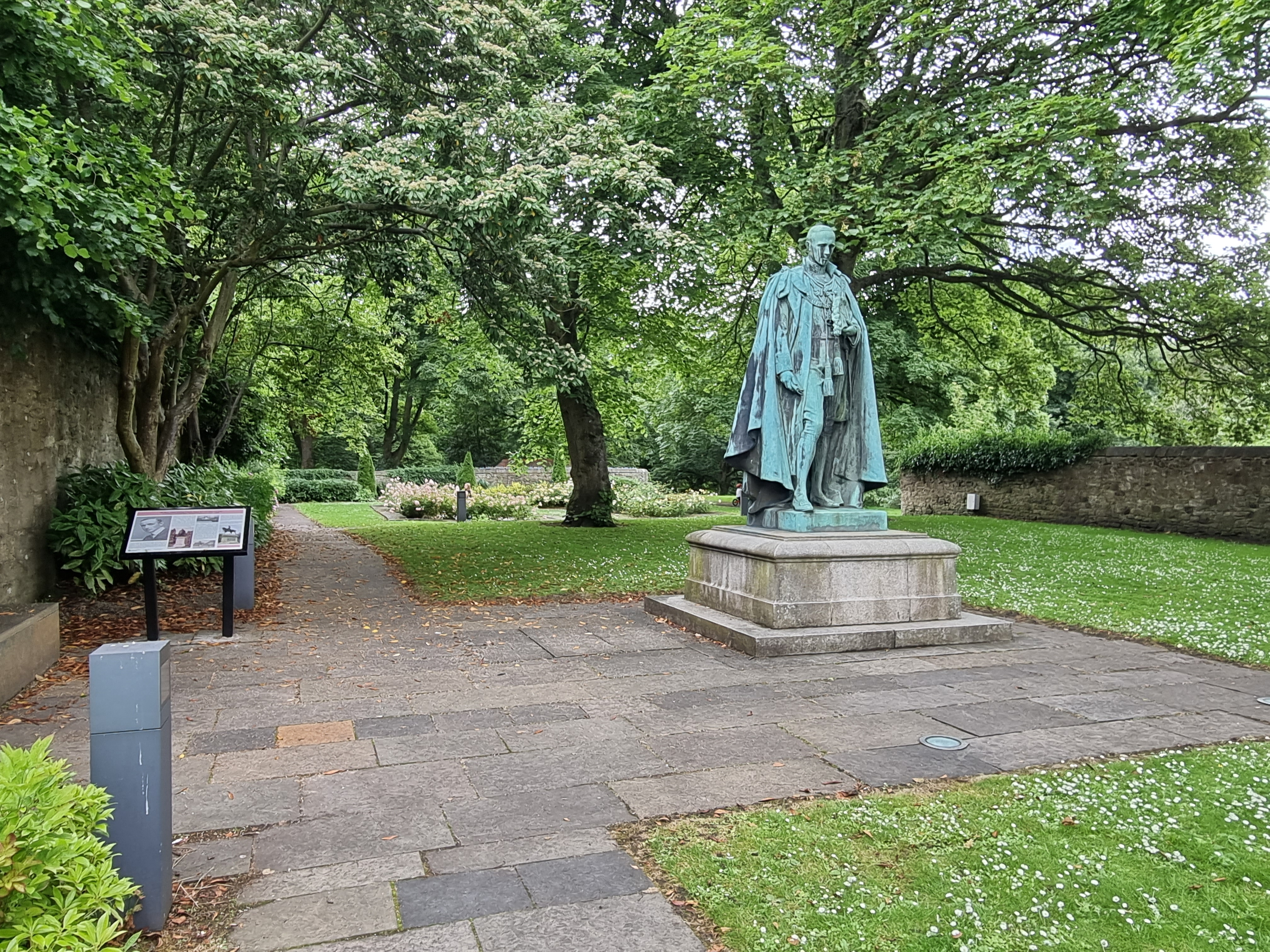
Linlithgow Rose Garden and statue of the Marquess of Linlithgow

The Linlithgow Union Canal Society runs a canal museum and operates narrowboat tours from Manse Road basin.

The town has two Church of Scotland parish churches: St Michael's and the smaller St. Ninian's Craigmailen. There are also churches of other denominations, including a Methodist chapel (now an evangelical church, St. John's, which meets in Linlithgow Academy on a Sunday morning); St Peter's, an architecturally distinctive Scottish Episcopal church; and a Roman Catholic church, also called St Michael's, which was used as an ambulance depot by Polish servicemen during the Second World War.

The Linlithgow Museum is a volunteer-run local history museum in Linlithgow. The museum is housed in the Linlithgow Partnership Centre, along with the West Lothian Family History Society and library.

St Michael's is a community hospital in the town, operated by NHS Lothian. The hospital has its origins in the Linlithgow Combination Poorhouse and Infirmary which opened on the site in 1856. An infectious diseases hospital was built on an adjacent site in around 1900. The poorhouse infirmary and the infectious diseases hospital came together to form St Michael's Home and Hospital in 1932. The combined facility joined the National Health Service in 1948. The poorhouse building was demolished in 1969 and replaced with the current modern facility.

A local pub and hotel on West Port named "The Black Bitch" (after the town's coat of arms) is reputed to be one of Scotland's oldest pubs although much of the building is recorded as dating to the 18th century. In early December 2021, the pub's owners, the Greene King chain, announced plans to change the name of the pub to "The Black Hound" on the basis that the original name had "racist and offensive connotations". The change was opposed by some local residents, who started a petition to retain the old name. By mid-December 2021, the petition had received over 10,000 signatures and had also resulted in a local demonstration. However, in February 2022, Greene King confirmed that a name change to "The Willow Tree" would take place.

=== Parks ===
Linlithgow has several parks and recreation grounds across the town. The largest public area is the Peel and Palace Royal Park beside Linlithgow Loch and palace, including a large open grassland (the Peel), a circulatory walk around the Loch and mature trees to the south.

Linlithgow Rose Garden is a mature rose garden in the area adjacent to the Kirk grave yard and the rear of the Burgh Halls and contains a large bronze statue of John Hope, 7th Earl of Hopetoun and Marquess of Linlithgow (created in 1911). As of 2021, the rose gardens are in the process of being improved.

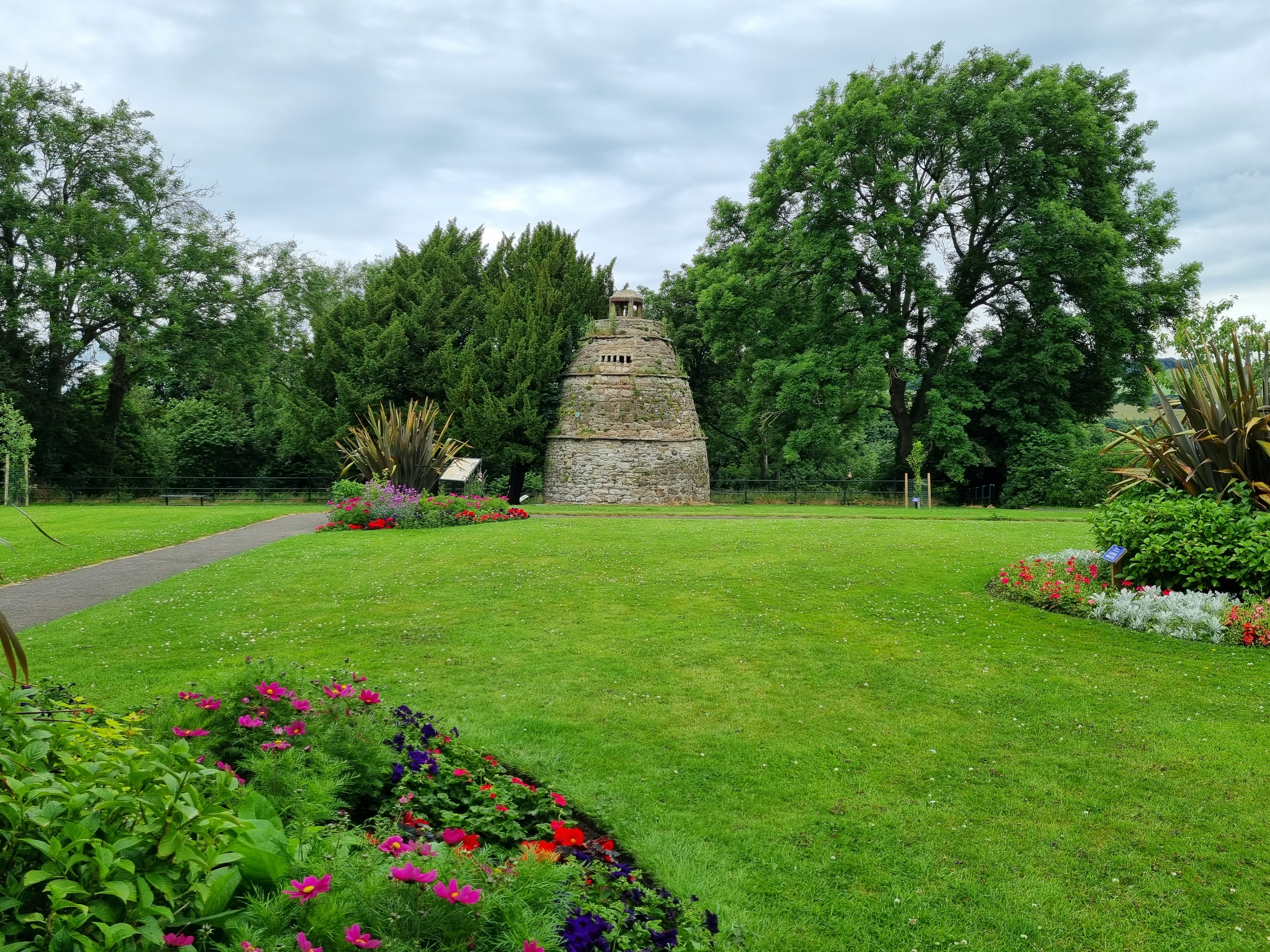
Learmonth Gardens and doocot, gifted to the town in 1916

Learmonth Gardens is located on the south side of the railway across from the canal basin and were given to Linlithgow in 1916 in memory of Alexander Learmonth, who was Provost of Linlithgow from 1802 to 1807. The key feature of the gardens is a 16th-century beehive type doocot that was originally part of the tail of a run rig from the house of Baron Ross of Halkhead on the High Street (the rig was split when the railway was created in 1842). The doocot has 370 nest boxes in 18 tiers and a lantern on the top although access inside is closed.

Rosemount Park is a large open public park in the centre of southern Linlithgow containing a Friar's Well. The well originally provided water for the former carmelite priory, destroyed during the Scottish Reformation and is now covered with a stone arch. The park contains several mature trees.

Kettlestoun Mains is a woodland walk beside the Avon Lagoon and near the former site of the Battle of Linlithgow Bridge. Just outside of Linlithgow, there are several country parks, including Beecraigs Country Park (a 370 hectare park between Bathgate and Linlithgow with forests, a visitor centre and a loch) and Muiravonside Country Park between Linlithgow and Torphichen (170 acres of woodland and grassland).

== Transport ==
=== Railways ===
Linlithgow railway station is the main railway station serving the town and is located on the Glasgow–Edinburgh via Falkirk line. It is also served by ScotRail services between Edinburgh Waverley and Dunblane. The station opened on 21 February 1842.

=== Road ===
The M9 Motorway is located on the northern outskirts of the town, connecting Linlithgow with Edinburgh, Stirling and Falkirk via motorway. The main east/west road through the town is the A803 road, part of which is the High St of Linlithgow. The main north/south road through the town is the A706 road.

=== Air ===
The nearest airport is Edinburgh Airport.

=== Buses ===
Linlithgow is served by McGill's Midland Bluebird bus service X38 between Edinburgh and Falkirk via Corstorphine, Kirkliston & Winchburgh. This service was previously operated by Lothian Country and before that it was operated by First Scotland East.

Linlithgow is also served by the 31 which is operated by SD Travel and operates between Bathgate and Livingston via Linlithgow as well as small surrounding villages such as Torphichen, Philpstoun, Bridgend, Threemiletown and Ecclesmachan.

Another service for Linlithgow operated by SD travel is the L1 which is a local town service that serves several housing estates around the town.

Other services in the town include the F1 Which is operated by Midland Bluebird on behalf of Falkirk Council, the bus operates between Maddiston and Linlithgow via the small villige of Whitecross a small village a 30 minute walk from Linlithgow bridge.

Linlithgow is served by 2 different buses to Bo'ness, the F45 and F49 both being operated by Midland Bluebird on behalf of Falkirk Council with the F45 going directly between Linlithgow and Bo'ness and the F49 going via Blackness

== Education ==
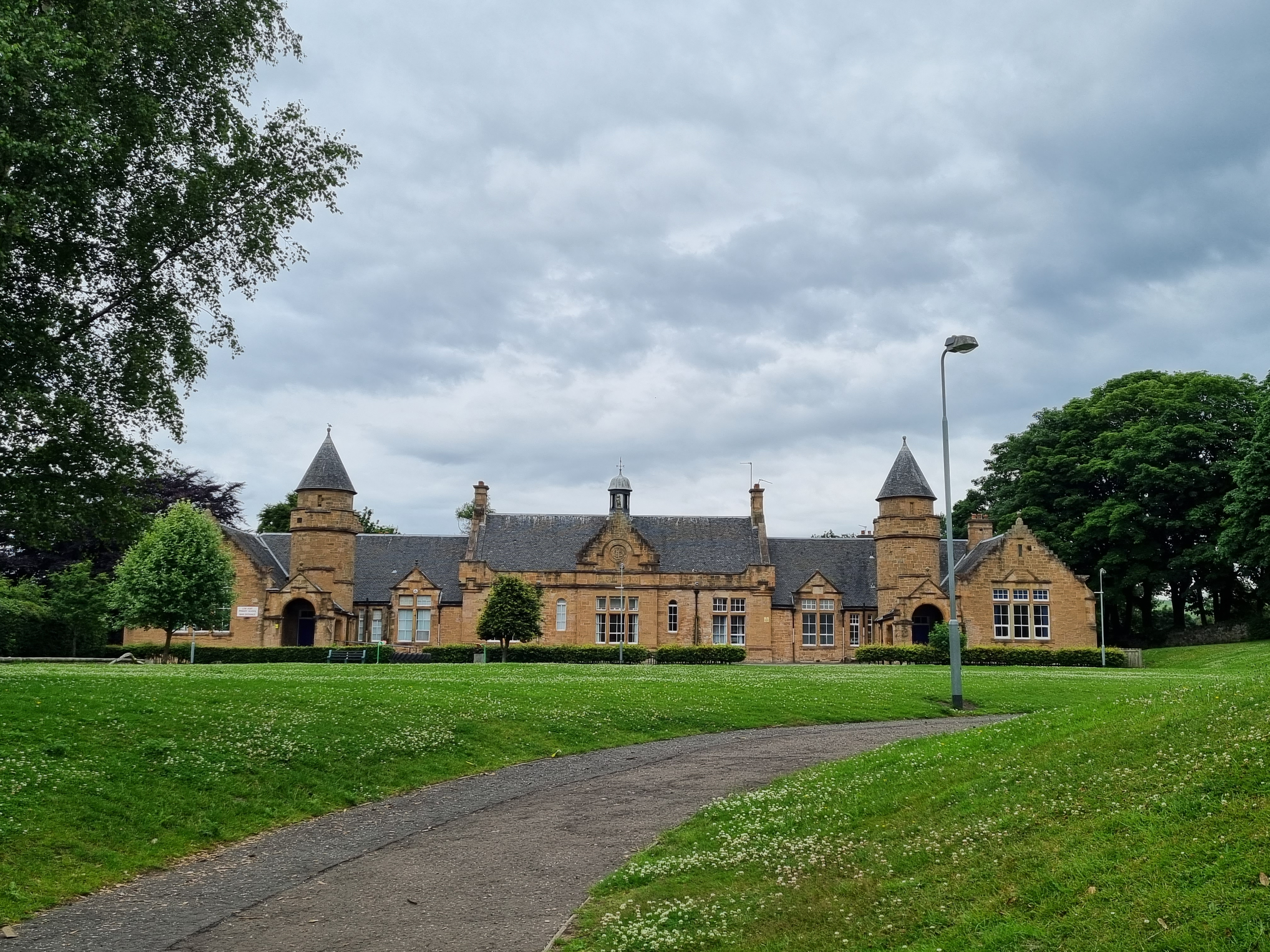
Low Port Primary School which occupies the former Linlithgow Academy Building.

Linlithgow has one Secondary school, Linlithgow Academy. The original Linlithgow Academy was housed in a purpose build sandstone building in East Port, designed in a Scots renaissance style with turrets by James Graham Fairley in 1900. The Academy moved to a new school complex on Braehead Road in 1968 towards the south-west of the town and the old academy buildings are now home to Low Port Primary School.

The town has five primary schools: Linlithgow Primary School, St Joseph's RC Primary School, Linlithgow Bridge Primary School, Low Port Primary School and Springfield Primary School.

Donaldson's School, Scotland's national school for the deaf, is based in the town, having relocated from Edinburgh to a new campus (the Sensational Learning Centre) in Linlithgow in 2008, designed by JM Architects. The school was built on the site of a former Signetics electronics factory that had opened in 1969 during the Silicon Glen period of development, which itself was built on an earlier Racal factory that produced defence radars and displays.

Linlithgow does not have a college in the town. The nearest colleges are West Lothian College in Livingston and Forth Valley College in Falkirk.

== Sport ==
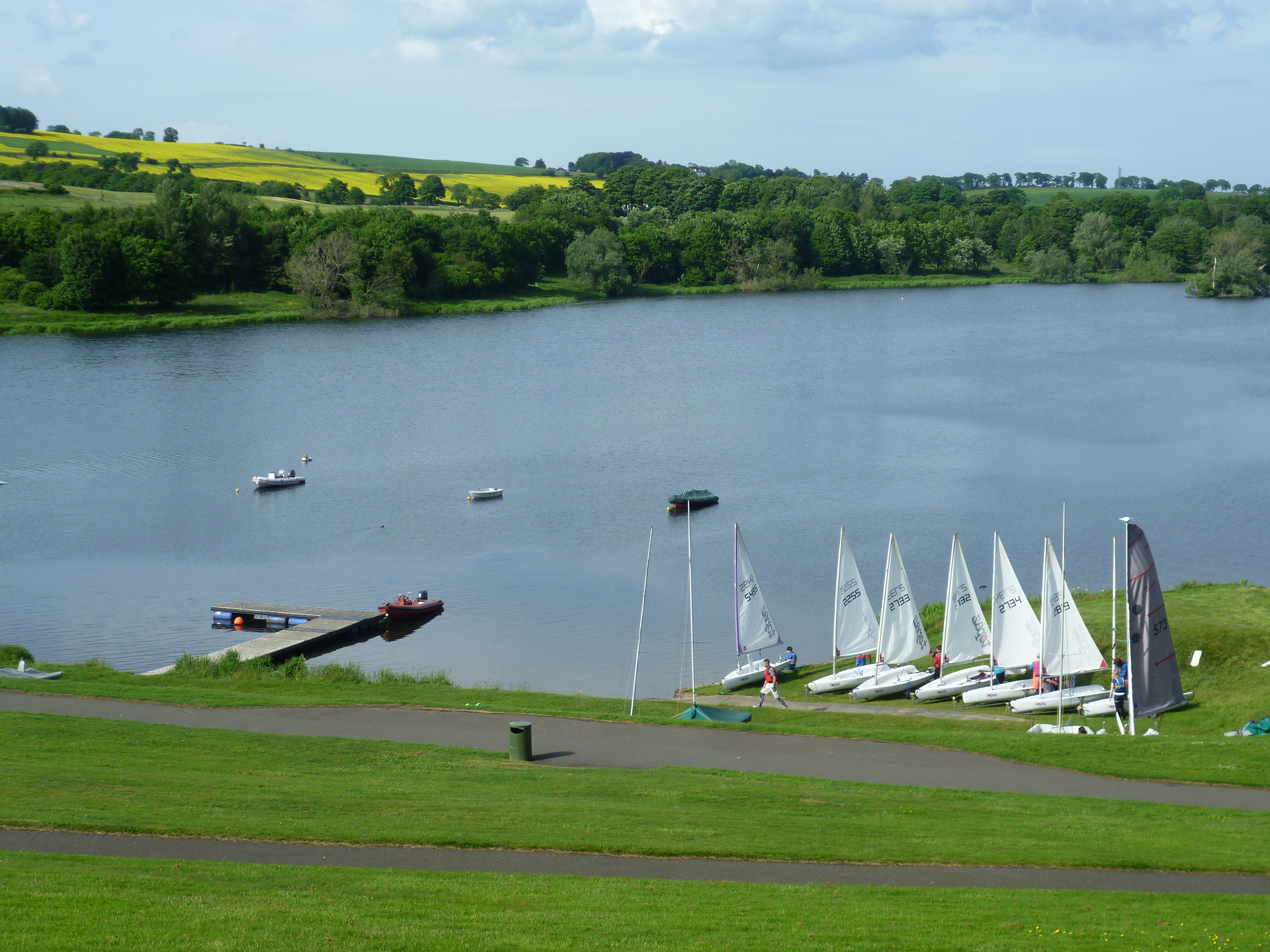
The eastern end of Linlithgow Loch from the Peel.

Linlithgow Rose Community Football Club (formed from a partnership of Linlithgow Rose Football Club and BFC Linlithgow) has about 500 player members, involved in soccer 4s, soccer 7s, girls, youth and adult junior football. The club has a dedicated goalkeeping school and referee training programme and has been awarded Community Level status in both the SFA Quality Mark and West Lothian Council Club Accreditation schemes.

Linlithgow is also host to Linlithgow Rose F.C., Linlithgow Rugby Football Club as well as Linlithgow Cricket Club who play at the Boghall Cricket Club Ground. Linlithgow also hosts two main registered Scotland Supporters Clubs for the Scottish National football team: Linlithgow & District Tartan Army (LADTA) and the Young Linlithgow Tartan Army (YLTA).

A number of local parks, including play areas for children, are spread throughout the burgh, with the tract of land surrounding the palace known as the Peel being particularly popular in summer. Low Port Outdoor Education Centre is situated next to the loch and provides facilities for many outdoor activities, many based on the adjacent loch. Nearby country parks include Beecraigs and Muiravonside.

Linlithgow golf club, founded in 1913, sits to the south of the canal on the western edge of town.

Motorcycle speedway took place at the Heathersfield Stadium on Myrehead Farm, Whitecross (55°58′46″N 3°39′32″W). The stadium was used as a training track until 1994, when a team called Linlithgow Lightning joined the 1994 British League Division Three. The team raced until the end of the 1999 season.

== Notable people ==
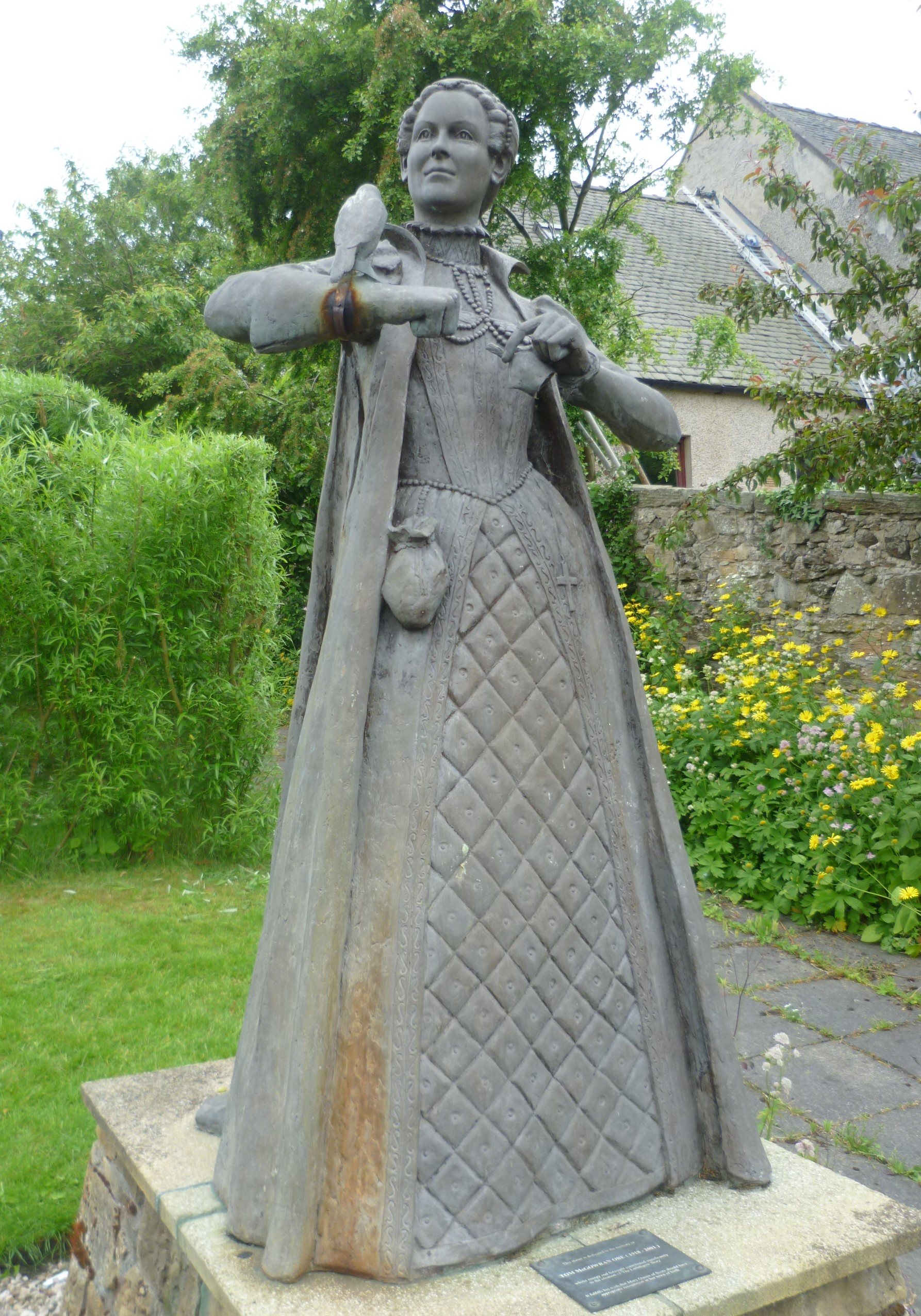
Mary, Queen of Scots, statue in the garden of the Annet House Museum

Scottish monarchs born in the town include King James V, born in Linlithgow Palace in 1512, and Mary, Queen of Scots, born and christened in Linlithgow in 1542.

Historical figures in trade, science and industry from Linlithgow include Sir Charles Wyville Thomson, natural historian, marine zoologist and chief scientist on the Challenger Expedition), John West, Captain (1809–1888, was a Scottish inventor and businessman who emigrated to Canada, California and later Oregon where he operated a cannery and exported tuna to Great Britain), David Waldie (a local chemist who recommended the use of chloroform in medical use to Sir James Young Simpson) and Sir Thomas Carlaw Martin (1850–1920, a newspaper editor and Director of the Royal Scottish Museum).

Sports figures include Colin Fleming (a professional tennis player was brought up and educated in Linlithgow), the Footballer Colin Stein (who was born in Linlithgow in 1947) and Footballer and Cricketer Donald Ford (was born in Linlithgow in 1944).

Notable persons in military history and politics include Robert Blair (a recipient of the Victoria Cross) and Alex Salmond (a former First Minister of Scotland, who was born in 1954 and grew up in Linlithgow).

In September 2007, a plaque was installed commemorating the fictional Star Trek character Montgomery "Scotty" Scott, the Enterprise's chief engineer, who, according to Star Trek lore, will be born in Linlithgow in 2222.

== Twin towns ==
Linlithgow is twinned with the French town Guyancourt and, as part of West Lothian, with Grapevine, Texas in the USA. This has resulted in exchange programmes where students from Linlithgow visit schools in Grapevine.

== See also ==
- Forth to Firth Canal Pathway
