= Linlithgow Loch =

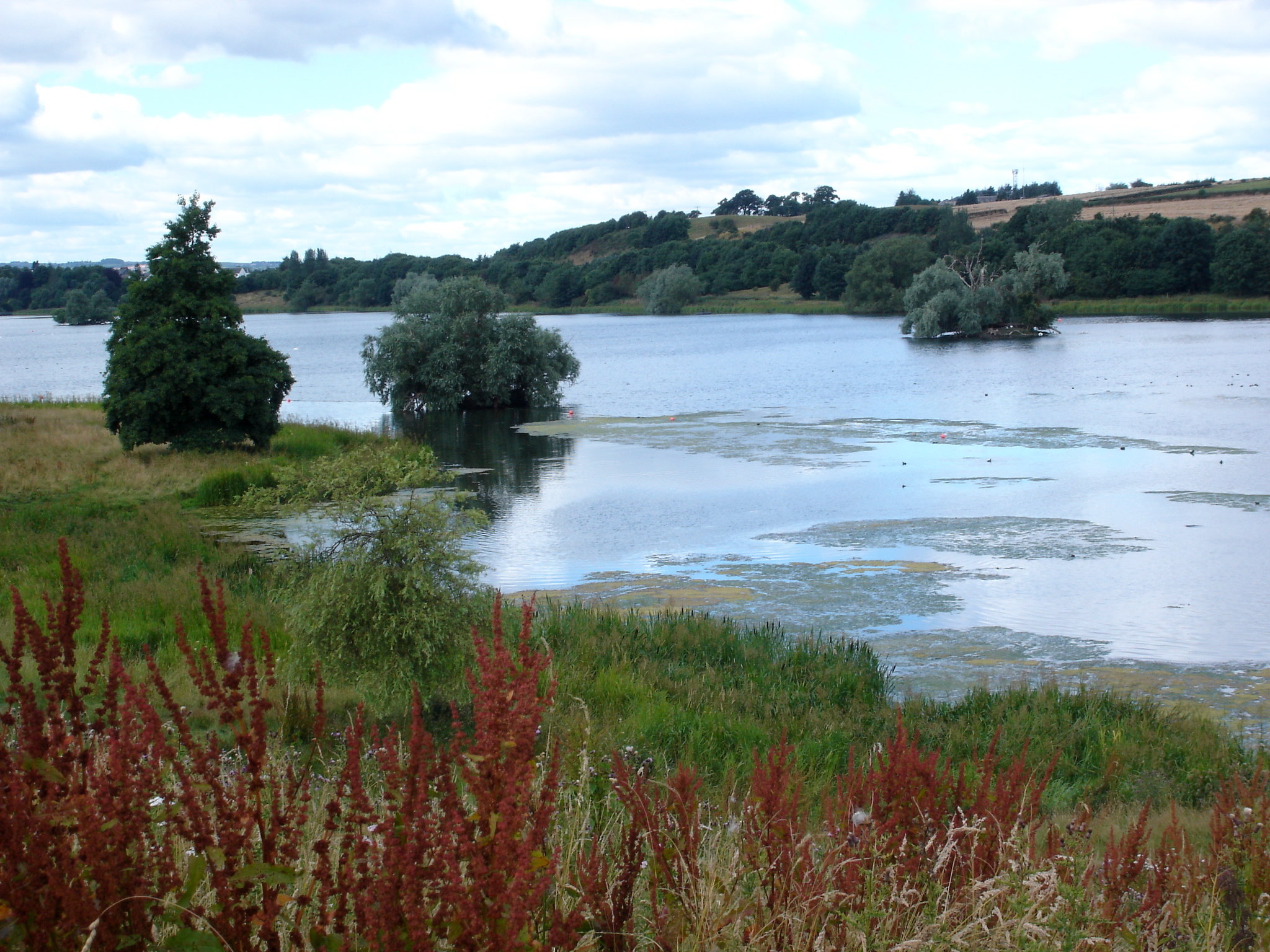
The eastern end of the loch, from the south. On the top right is Cormorant Island.

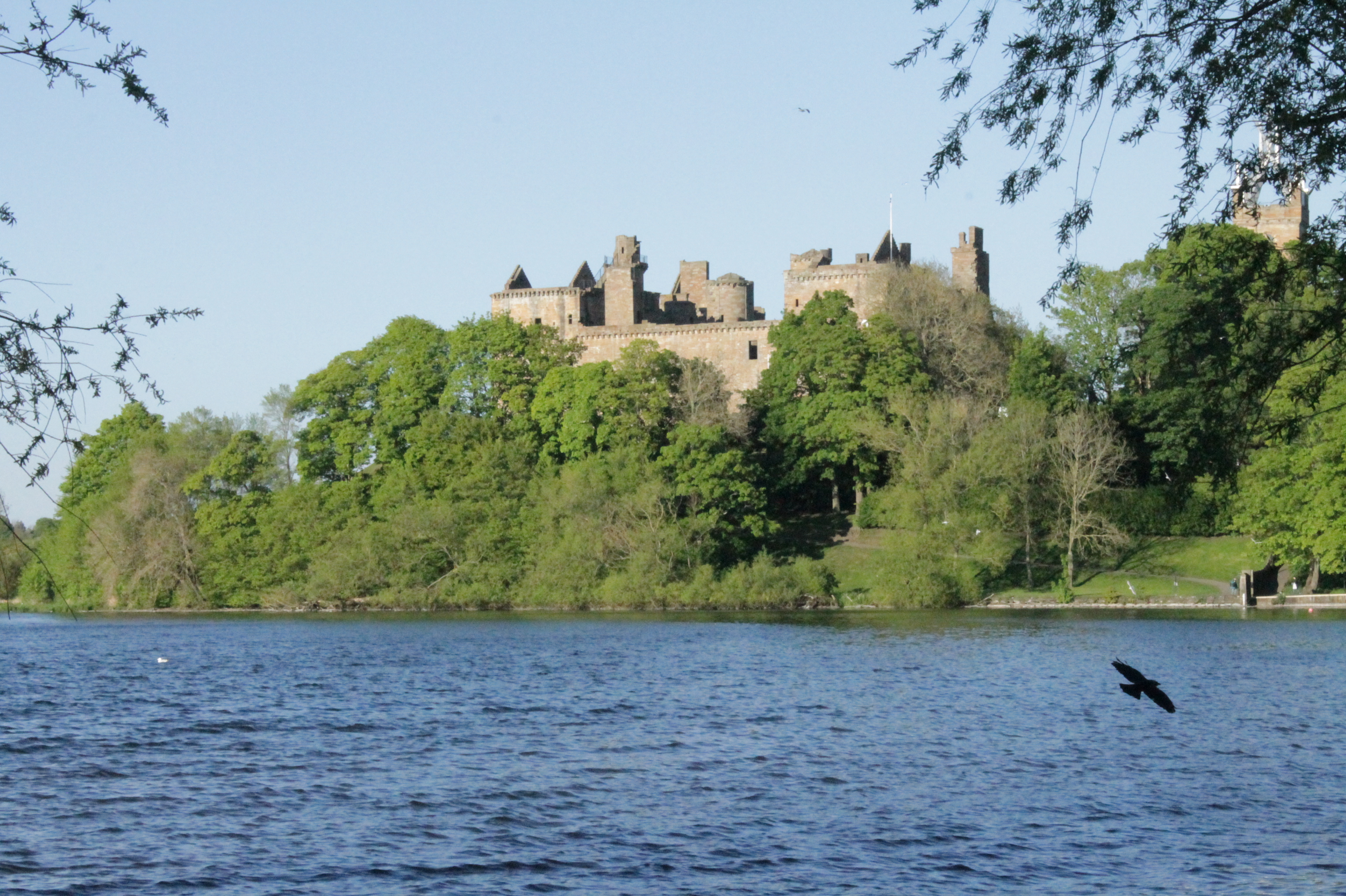
Linlithgow Palace from Linlithgow Loch looking east

Linlithgow Loch lies immediately north of the town of Linlithgow in West Lothian, Scotland. 1.3 kilometres in length and 0.4 in breadth, its area of 41 hectares makes it the largest natural freshwater loch in Lothian. It is, however, shallow, with a mean depth of 2.3 metres and a maximum depth of 9.2 metres. The loch is fed by four small streams, the Hatchery Burn, the Bonnytoun Burn, the Springfield Burn, and Bell's Burn, and drained by the Mill Burn on its western side, which eventually joins the Avon.

The loch is the source of the town of Linlithgow's name; the British llyn laith cau translates to "lake in the damp hollow". Two islets in the loch, Cormorant Island and the Rickle, are thought to be the 5,000 year old remains of crannogs.

== History ==
In the winter of 1847/8 Linlithgow Loch in its frozen state played host to the Grand Curling Match, a major sporting event, which was depicted by artist Charles Lees.

== Fishing and boating ==
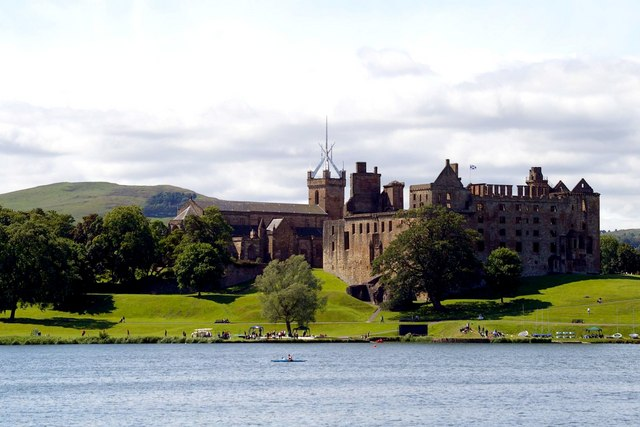
View of Cockleroy Hill, St Michael's Church, and Linlithgow Palace, from the north shore.

Linlithgow Loch was once famed for its brown trout, but most of the sport today comes from stocked rainbow trout, regularly released by the Forth Area Federation of Anglers.

The Low Port Centre, which was run by West Lothian Leisure, provided facilities for sailing, canoeing, kayaking, and windsurfing on the loch prior to the closure of the building in 2021. The future of the LPC site is currently uncertain.

== Conservation ==
Urban and agricultural runoff make eutrophication a concern. Algal blooms have affected the loch's value for wildlife and recreation.

Linlithgow Loch is a Site of Special Scientific Interest due to it being an example of a lowland eutrophic loch and supporting representative examples of aquatic and emergent plant communities.
