= John Lithgow (disambiguation) =

John Lithgow is an American actor, musician, and author.

John Lithgow may also refer to:

- John Lithgow (New Zealand politician) (1933–2004)
- John T. Lithgow, former acting Commissioner of Yukon
