= William Lithgow =

William Lithgow may refer to:

- William Lithgow (traveller and author) (1582–1645), Scottish traveller and author
- William Lithgow (judge) (1715–1798), judge for the Court of Common Pleas of Massachusetts
- William Lithgow (auditor-general) (1784–1864), Scottish clergyman, first Auditor General of New South Wales
- William Lithgow (shipbuilder) (1854–1908), Scottish shipbuilder
- William Lithgow (cricketer) (1920–1997), English cricketer and British Army officer
- Sir William Lithgow, 2nd Baronet (1934–2022), Scottish industrialist from shipbuilding family
