= Bert Lithgow =

Australian rules footballer

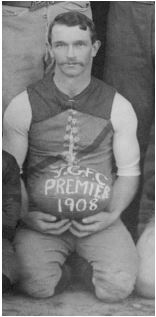
- Boromeo in 1908

Personal information
- Full name: Robert Joseph Lithgow
- Born: 19 March 1881; Eltham, Victoria
- Died: 22 April 1951 (aged 70); Yarra Glen, Victoria
- Original team: Yarra Glen

Playing career^{1}
Years	Club	Games (Goals)
1903–1904	Carlton	9 (3)
- ^{1} Playing statistics correct to the end of 1904.

Robert Joseph Lithgow (19 March 1881 – 22 April 1951) was an Australian rules footballer who played for the Carlton Football Club in the Victorian Football League (VFL).
