= James Lithgow =

James Lithgow may refer to:

- James S. Lithgow (1812–1902), mayor of Louisville, Kentucky
- Sir James Lithgow, 1st Baronet (1883–1952), Scottish industrialist
