= Motherwell, Wishaw and Carluke =

UK Parliament constituency (since 2024)

- County constituency for the House of Commons
- Interactive map of boundaries from 2024
- Boundary of Motherwell, Wishaw and Carluke in Scotland
- Subdivision: North Lanarkshire; South Lanarkshire
- Electorate: 72,318 (March 2020)
- Major settlements: Motherwell, Wishaw, Carluke

Current constituency
- Created: 2024
- Member of Parliament: Pamela Nash (Labour)
- Created from: Motherwell and Wishaw

Motherwell, Wishaw and Carluke is a constituency of the House of Commons in the UK Parliament. Further to the completion of the 2023 review of Westminster constituencies, it was first contested at the 2024 general election, when it was won by Pamela Nash of Scottish Labour.

== Boundaries ==
The constituency comprises the following:

- In full: the North Lanarkshire Council wards of Motherwell South East and Ravenscraig, Motherwell West, Wishaw.
- In part: the North Lanarkshire Council wards of Motherwell North (southern parts including Carfin), Murdostoun (southern and western areas including Cambusnethan and Coltness); and the South Lanarkshire Council wards of Clydesdale North (minority, comprising northern areas, including the village of Forth), Clydesdale West (nearly all, including the town of Carluke).

The bulk of the constituency, comprising the areas in North Lanarkshire comes from the former Motherwell and Wishaw constituency; the areas in South Lanarkshire were previously part of the abolished Lanark and Hamilton East constituency.

== Constituency profile ==
Electoral Calculus characterises the seat as "Traditionalist", with left-wing economic views but more liberal social attitudes. Incomes and house prices in the seat are well below UK averages.

== Elections ==
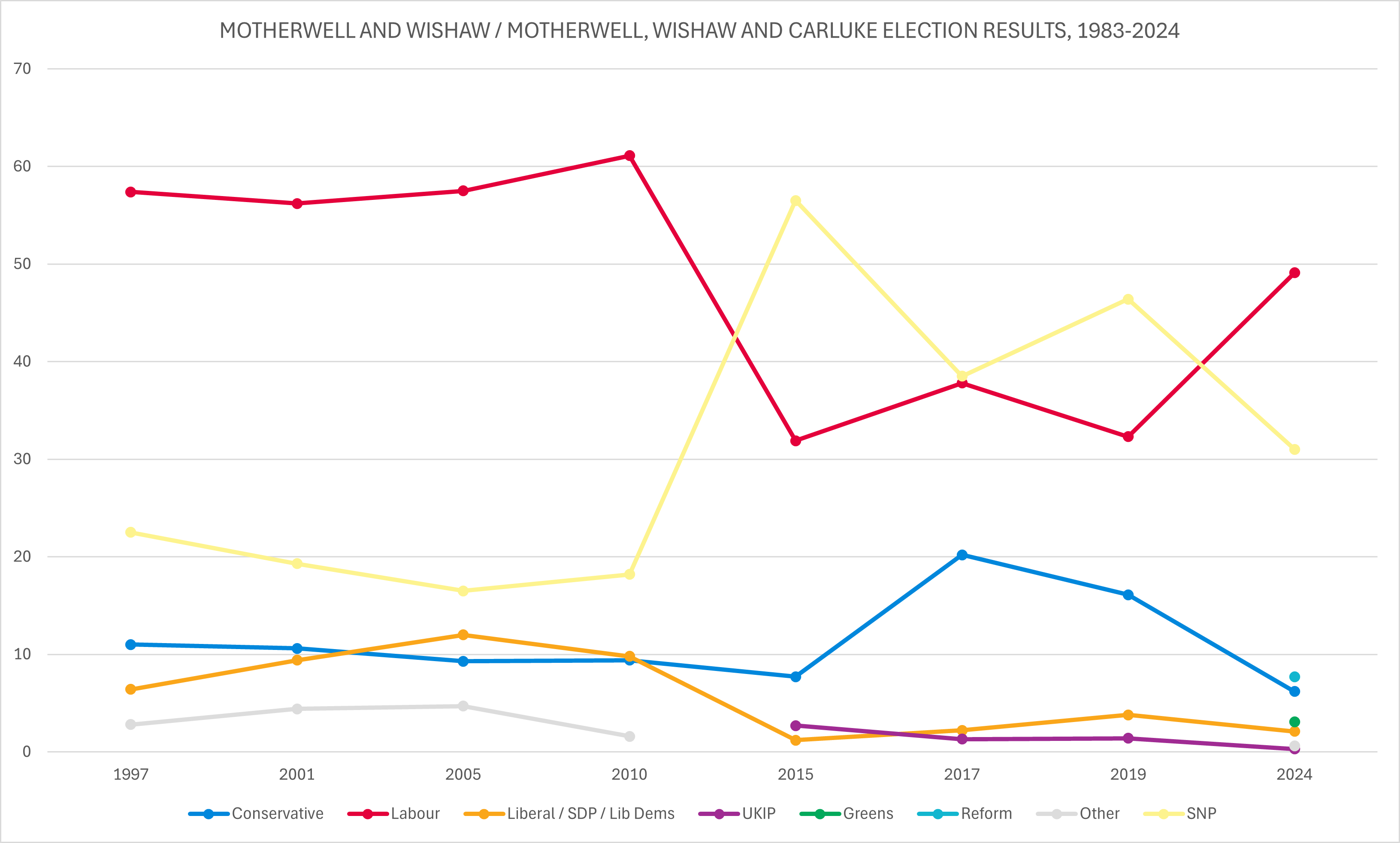
Election results 1997–2024

=== Elections in the 2020s ===
General election 2024: Motherwell, Wishaw and Carluke
Party	Candidate	Votes	%	±%
Labour	Pamela Nash	19,168	49.1	+21.6
SNP	Marion Fellows	12,083	31.0	−14.9
Reform	Robert McLaughlan	3,004	7.7	N/A
Conservative	Oyebola Ajala	2,415	6.2	−15.0
Green	Gordon Miller	1,200	3.1	N/A
Liberal Democrats	Hayley Bennie	822	2.1	−1.9
BUP	Gus Ferguson	158	0.4	N/A
UKIP	Neil Wilson	110	0.3	−1.1
Scottish Libertarian	Ross Hagen	66	0.2	N/A
Majority		7,085	18.1	N/A
Turnout		39,026	54.4	−7.7
Registered electors		71,777		
Labour gain from SNP		Swing	+18.2	

=== Elections in the 2010s ===
2019 notional result (Note: Estimate of the 2019 general election result as if the revised boundaries recommended under the 2023 boundary review were in place)
Party	Vote	%
SNP	20,638	45.9
Labour	12,344	27.5
Conservative	9,537	21.2
Liberal Democrats	1,781	4.0
UKIP	619	1.4
Majority	8,294	18.5
Turnout	44,919	62.1
Electorate	72,318	
