= Motherwell and Wishaw (Scottish Parliament constituency) =

Region or constituency of the Scottish Parliament

- Burgh constituency for the Scottish Parliament
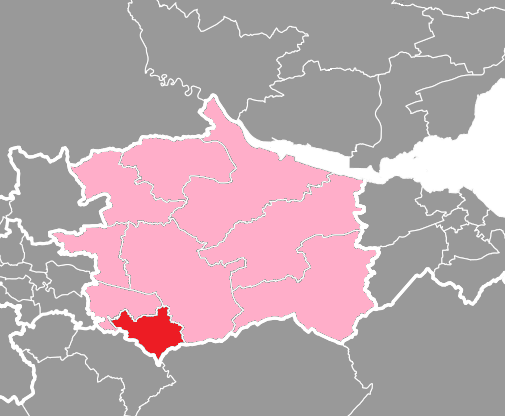

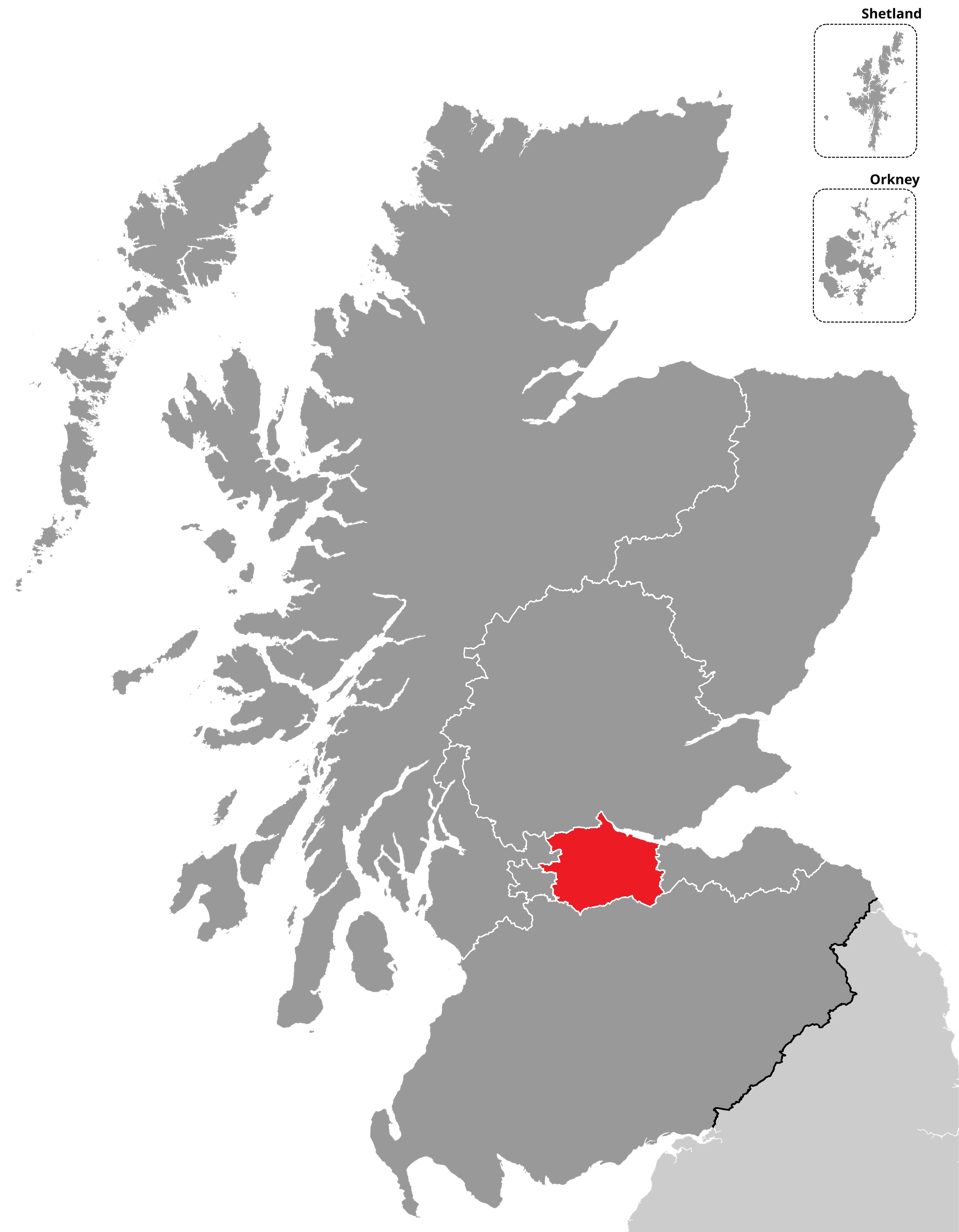
- Motherwell and Wishaw shown within the Central Scotland and Lothians West electoral region, and the region shown within Scotland
- Electoral region: Central Scotland and Lothians West
- Electorate: 57,852 (2026)

Current constituency
- Created: 1999
- Party: Scottish National Party
- MSP: Clare Adamson
- Council area: North Lanarkshire

Motherwell and Wishaw is a burgh constituency of the Scottish Parliament covering part of the council area of North Lanarkshire. It elects one Member of the Scottish Parliament (MSP) by the plurality (first past the post) method of election. Under the additional-member electoral system used for elections to the Scottish Parliament, it is also one of nine constituencies in the Central Scotland and Lothians West electoral region, which elects seven additional members, in addition to nine constituency MSPs, to produce a form of proportional representation for the region as a whole.

The seat has been held by Clare Adamson of the Scottish National Party since the 2016 Scottish Parliament election.

== Electoral region ==
The other eight constituencies of the Central Scotland and Lothians West region are Airdrie, Almond Valley, Bathgate, Coatbridge and Chryston, Cumbernauld and Kilsyth, Falkirk East and Linlithgow, Falkirk West, and Uddingston and Bellshill. The region covers all of the Falkirk, North Lanarkshire and West Lothian council areas, and parts of the South Lanarkshire council area.

Prior to the second periodic review of Scottish Parliament boundaries, Motherwell and Wishaw was part of the Central Scotland electoral region. The other eight constituencies of this region were Airdrie and Shotts, Coatbridge and Chryston, Cumbernauld and Kilsyth, East Kilbride, Falkirk East, Falkirk West, Hamilton, Larkhall and Stonehouse and Uddingston and Bellshill. The region covered all of the Falkirk council area, all of the North Lanarkshire council area and part of the South Lanarkshire council area.

== Constituency boundaries and council area ==
Map of boundaries 2005

The constituency was created at the same time as the Scottish Parliament, for the 1999 Scottish Parliament election, and was identical to the existing Motherwell and Wishaw constituency of the House of Commons of the United Kingdom. Ahead of the 2005 United Kingdom general election, the boundaries of the Scottish House of Commons constituencies were altered, whilst the Scottish Parliamentary boundaries were left unchanged. There is now longer any link between the two sets of boundaries.

Scottish Parliamentary boundaries were reviewed ahead of the 2011 Scottish Parliament election. The electoral wards used in the 2011 version of Motherwell and Wishaw are listed below. All of these wards are part of North Lanarkshire.

- In full: Motherwell West, Motherwell South East and Ravenscraig, Murdostoun, and Wishaw
- In part: Motherwell North (shared with Uddingston and Bellshill)

Following the second review of Scottish Parliament boundaries, the following North Lanarkshire Council electoral wards were used to redefine the seat:

- Motherwell West (entire ward)
- Motherwell South East and Ravenscraig (entire ward)
- Murdostoun (entire ward)
- Wishaw (entire ward)
- Motherwell North (shared with Uddingston and Bellshill)
- Fortissat (shared with Airdrie)

On the 2011 boundaries, Motherwell and Wishaw was one of four covering the North Lanarkshire council area, the others being Airdrie and Shotts, Coatbridge and Chryston and Cumbernauld and Kilsyth; Uddingston and Bellshill spans parts of both North and South Lanarkshire. All five formed part of the Central Scotland electoral region. For 2026 Airdrie and Shotts was renamed by the Airdrie seat, and the other North Lanarkshire seats underwent boundary changes. All five seats now form part of the new Central Scotland and Lothians West electoral region.

== Member of the Scottish Parliament ==
The seat had always elected Labour MSPs (until 2016), it was a safe Labour seat from 1999 until 2011. The MSP from 1999 was the former First Minister, Lord Jack McConnell. The MSP John Pentland won the seat on McConnell's retirement in 2011, but the national SNP landslide of that year turned it for the first time from safe Labour into a Labour-SNP marginal with just two percentage points separating Pentland and his nearest opponent, the SNP's Clare Adamson. Adamson defeated Pentland to gain the seat in 2016.

| Election | Member | Party |
|---|---|---|
| 1999 | Jack McConnell | Labour |
| 2011 | John Pentland | Labour |
| 2016 | Clare Adamson | SNP |

== Election results ==
=== 2020s ===
2026 Scottish Parliament election: Motherwell and Wishaw
| Party | Candidate | Constituency | | | Regional | | |
| Party | Candidate | Votes | % | ±% | Votes | % | ±% |
|---|---|---|---|---|---|---|---|
| SNP | Clare Adamson (Note: Incumbent member for this constituency) | 11,962 | 43.7 | ▼9.5 | 8,480 | 31.1 | ▼14.8 |
| Labour | Ayeshah Khan | 6,447 | 23.6 | ▼6.7 | 5,726 | 21.0 | ▼3.7 |
| Reform | Duncan MacMillan | 5,692 | 20.8 | New | 5,731 | 21.0 | ▲20.8 |
| Green | | | | | 3200 | 11.7 | ▲6.0 |
| Conservative | Bob Burgess | 1,638 | 6.0 | ▼7.1 | 1748 | 6.4 | ▼10.9 |
| Liberal Democrats | Jenni Lang | 979 | 3.6 | ▲2.0 | 933 | 3.4 | ▲1.9 |
| AtLS | Greig MacArthur | 298 | 1.1 | New | 361 | 1.3 | New |
| Independent | Dominic James Alderson | 328 | 1.2 | New | | | |
| Scottish Family | | | | | 295 | 1.1 | ▲0.4 |
| Independent Green Voice | | | | | 260 | 1.0 | ▲0.2 |
| ISP | | | | | 163 | 0.6 | New |
| Scottish Socialist | | | | | 122 | 0.4 | New |
| Abolish the Scottish Parliament | | | | | 86 | 0.3 | ▲0.1 |
| Workers Party | | | | | 85 | 0.3 | New |
| Advance UK | | | | | 41 | 0.2 | New |
| Scottish Libertarian | | | | | 32 | 0.1 | ▼0.2 |
| UKIP | | | | | 28 | 0.1 | ▼0.1 |
| Majority | | 5,515 | 20.2 | ▼2.7 | | | |
| Valid votes | | 27,344 | | | 27,291 | | |
| Invalid votes | | 99 | | | 67 | | |
| Turnout | | 27,443 | 47.4 | ▼11.5 | 27,358 | 47.3 | ▼11.6 |
| SNP hold | | Swing | | ▼1.4 | | | |
Notes

2021 Scottish Parliament election: Motherwell and Wishaw
| Party | Candidate | Constituency | | | Regional | | |
| Party | Candidate | Votes | % | ±% | Votes | % | ±% |
|---|---|---|---|---|---|---|---|
| SNP | Clare Adamson (Note: Incumbent member for this constituency) | 18,156 | 53.2 | ▲0.7 | 15,672 | 45.9 | ▼1.8 |
| Labour | Martine Nolan | 10,343 | 30.3 | ▼0.8 | 8,429 | 24.7 | ▼1.8 |
| Conservative | Nathan Wilson | 4,472 | 13.1 | ▼0.6 | 5,911 | 17.3 | ▲3.0 |
| Green | | | | | 1,951 | 5.7 | ▲2.0 |
| Liberal Democrats | Martin Veart | 557 | 1.6 | ▼1.0 | 520 | 1.5 | ▼0.3 |
| Alba | | | | | 496 | 1.5 | New |
| All for Unity | | | | | 278 | 0.8 | New |
| Independent Green Voice | | | | | 254 | 0.7 | New |
| Scottish Family | | | | | 228 | 0.7 | New |
| Scottish Libertarian | Mark Meechan | 254 | 0.7 | New | 94 | 0.3 | New |
| Abolish the Scottish Parliament | | | | | 86 | 0.3 | New |
| Reform | | | | | 63 | 0.2 | New |
| UKIP | Neil Wilson | 173 | 0.5 | N/A | 62 | 0.2 | ▼2.2 |
| Freedom Alliance (UK) | | | | | 62 | 0.2 | New |
| Independent | Paddy Hogg | | | | 49 | 0.1 | New |
| Communist | Daniel Lambe | 194 | 0.6 | New | | | |
| Majority | | 9,437 | 22.9 | ▲1.5 | | | |
| Valid votes | | 34,149 | | | 34,155 | | |
| Invalid votes | | 84 | | | 74 | | |
| Turnout | | 34,233 | 58.9 | ▲7.7 | 34,229 | 58.9 | ▲7.6 |
| SNP hold | | Swing | | | | | |

=== 2010s ===
Scottish Parliament Election 2016: Motherwell and Wishaw
| Party | Candidate | Constituency | | | Regional | | |
| Party | Candidate | Votes | % | ±% | Votes | % | ±% |
|---|---|---|---|---|---|---|---|
| SNP | Clare Adamson (Note: Incumbent member on the party list, or for another constituency) | 15,291 | 52.5 | ▲11.1 | 13,952 | 47.7 | ▲5.8 |
| Labour | John Pentland (Note: Incumbent member for this constituency) | 9,068 | 31.1 | ▼12.7 | 7,751 | 26.5 | ▼12.2 |
| Conservative | Meghan Gallacher | 3,991 | 13.7 | ▲6.5 | 4,169 | 14.3 | ▲7.9 |
| Green | | | | | 1,080 | 3.7 | ▲2.5 |
| UKIP | | | | | 698 | 2.4 | ▲1.9 |
| Liberal Democrats | Yvonne Finlayson | 761 | 2.6 | ▲1.1 | 516 | 1.8 | ▲0.6 |
| RISE | | | | | 389 | 1.3 | New |
| Solidarity | | | | | 332 | 1.1 | ▲0.8 |
| Scottish Christian | | | | | 298 | 1.0 | ▼1.2 |
| Independent | Deryck Beaumont | | | | 48 | 0.2 | New |
| Majority | | 6,223 | 21.4 | N/A | | | |
| Valid votes | | 29,111 | | | 29,233 | | |
| Invalid votes | | 133 | | | 38 | | |
| Turnout | | 29,244 | 51.2 | ▲5.5 | 29,271 | 51.3 | ▲5.5 |
| SNP gain from Labour | | Swing | | ▲11.9 | | | |
Notes

Scottish Parliament Election 2011: Motherwell and Wishaw
| Party | Candidate | Constituency | | | Regional | | |
| Party | Candidate | Votes | % | ±% | Votes | % | ±% |
|---|---|---|---|---|---|---|---|
| Labour | John Pentland | 10,713 | 43.8 | N/A | 9,473 | 38.7 | N/A |
| SNP | Clare Adamson (Note: Elected on the party list) | 10,126 | 41.4 | N/A | 10,252 | 41.9 | N/A |
| Conservative | Robert Burgess | 1,753 | 7.2 | N/A | 1,564 | 6.4 | N/A |
| Scottish Senior Citizens | John Swinburne | 945 | 3.9 | N/A | 906 | 3.7 | N/A |
| Scottish Christian | Tom Selfridge | 547 | 2.2 | N/A | 529 | 2.2 | N/A |
| Socialist Labour | | | | | 338 | 1.4 | N/A |
| Liberal Democrats | Beverley Hope | 367 | 1.5 | N/A | 302 | 1.2 | N/A |
| Green | | | | | 296 | 1.2 | N/A |
| BNP | | | | | 237 | 1.0 | N/A |
| UKIP | | | | | 119 | 0.5 | N/A |
| Scottish Socialist | | | | | 112 | 0.5 | N/A |
| Solidarity | | | | | 85 | 0.3 | N/A |
| Independent | Hugh O'Donnell | | | | 61 | 0.2 | N/A |
| Others | | | | | 211 | 0.9 | N/A |
| Majority | | 587 | 2.4 | N/A | | | |
| Valid votes | | 24,451 | | | 24,485 | | |
| Invalid votes | | 63 | | | 51 | | |
| Turnout | | 24,514 | 45.7 | N/A | 24,536 | 45.8 | N/A |
| Labour win (new boundaries) | | | | | | | |

=== 2000s ===
Scottish Parliament Election 2007: Motherwell and Wishaw
| Party | Candidate | Votes | % | ±% |
|---|---|---|---|---|
| Labour | Jack McConnell | 12,574 | 48.1 | −6.0 |
| SNP | Marion Fellows | 6,636 | 25.4 | +7.8 |
| Conservative | Diane Huddleston | 1,990 | 7.6 | −2.4 |
| Scottish Senior Citizens | John Swinburne | 1,702 | 6.5 | +0.2 |
| Liberal Democrats | Stuart Douglas | 1,570 | 6.0 | +1.8 |
| Scottish Christian | Thomas Selfridge | 1,491 | 5.7 | New |
| ATP | Richard Leat | 187 | 0.7 | New |
| Majority | | 5,928 | 22.7 | −13.8 |
| Rejected ballots | | 970 | 3.7 | |
| Turnout | | 26,150 | 48.5 | −0.5 |
| Labour hold | | Swing | | |

Scottish Parliament Election 2003: Motherwell and Wishaw
| Party | Candidate | Votes | % | ±% |
|---|---|---|---|---|
| Labour | Jack McConnell | 13,739 | 54.12 | +8.21 |
| SNP | Lloyd Quinan | 4,480 | 17.65 | −11.62 |
| Conservative | Mark Nolan | 2,542 | 10.01 | −2.17 |
| Scottish Socialist | John Milligan | 1,961 | 7.72 | New |
| Scottish Senior Citizens | John Swinburne | 1,597 | 6.29 | +6.29 |
| Liberal Democrats | Keith Legg | 1,069 | 4.21 | −2.04 |
| Majority | | 9,259 | 36.47 | +19.84 |
| Turnout | | 25,388 | 49.03 | −8.63 |
| Labour hold | | Swing | | |

=== 1990s ===
Scottish Parliament Election 1999: Motherwell and Wishaw
| Party | Candidate | Votes | % | ±% |
|---|---|---|---|---|
| Labour | Jack McConnell | 13,925 | 45.9 | N/A |
| SNP | Jim McGuigan | 8,879 | 29.3 | N/A |
| Conservative | William Gibson | 3,694 | 12.2 | N/A |
| Socialist Labour | John Milligan | 1,941 | 6.4 | N/A |
| Liberal Democrats | Roger Spillane | 1,895 | 6.2 | N/A |
| Majority | | 5,046 | 16.6 | N/A |
| Turnout | | 30,334 | 57.1 | N/A |
| Labour win (new seat) | | | | |

== Footnotes ==
=== Bibliography ===
- "Second Review of Scottish Parliament Boundaries: Report to Scottish Ministers" (PDF). Boundaries Scotland. April 2025.

== See also ==
- Motherwell and Wishaw (UK Parliament constituency)

| Preceded by Fife Central | Constituency represented by the First Minister; 2001–2007 | Succeeded by Gordon |
