= 2012 North Lanarkshire Council election =

2012 Scottish local government election

- 3 May 2012

All 70 seats to North Lanarkshire Council 36 seats needed for a majority
	First party	Second party	Third party
Leader	Jim McCabe	David Stocks	Robert McKendrick
Party	Labour	SNP	Independent
Leader's seat	Thorniewood	Airdrie Central	Murdostoun
Last election	40 seats, 57.1%	23 seats, 32.9%	5 seats, 7.1%
Seats before	43	22	5
Seats won	41	26	2
Seat change	▲1	▲3	▼3
	Fourth party	Fifth party	Sixth party
Leader	Alan O'Brien	Linsey McKay	John Love
Party	CICA	Conservative	Liberal Democrats
Leader's seat	Cumbernauld North	Motherwell South East and Ravenscraig	Airdrie South
Last election	0 seats, 0%	1 seats, 1.4%	1 seat, 1.4%
Seats before	1	1	1
Seats won	1	0	0
Seat change	▲1	▼1	▼1
Council Leader before election
Jim McCabe
Labour
Council Leader after election
Jim McCabe
Labour

Elections to North Lanarkshire Council were held on 3 May 2012 on the same day as the 31 other local authorities in Scotland. The election used the twenty wards created under the Local Governance (Scotland) Act 2004, with 70 Councillors being elected. Each ward elected either 3 or 4 members, using the STV electoral system.

The election saw Labour retain their traditional position as the largest party on the Council as they gained 1 seat from 2007 and retained their overall majority. The Scottish National Party also increased their representation and remained in second place on the authority with 3 net gains. Both the Scottish Conservative and Unionist Party and the Scottish Liberal Democrats were wiped out losing their single Council seats. Independents saw their seat numbers fall from 5 to 2 while former SNP Councillor, Alan O'Brien, was elected for the Cumbernauld Independent Councillors Alliance.

Following the election the Labour Party again formed an administration.

== Election result ==
North Lanarkshire local election result 2012
Party	Seats	Gains	Losses	Net gain/loss	Seats %	Votes %	Votes	+/−
Labour	41	2	1	+1	58.6	50.8	47,284	+1.2
SNP	26	3	0	+3	37.1	34.6	32,228	+2.9
Independent	2	0	3	-3	3.0	6.1	5,722	+0.8
CICA	1	1	0	+1	1.4	2.0	1,894	New
Conservative	0	0	1	-1	0.0	5.5	5,111	-2.0
Scottish Socialist	0	-	-	-	-	0.4	379	-1.1
Liberal Democrats	0	0	1	-1	0.0	0.4	333	-1.4
TUSC	0	-	-	-	-	0.1	95	New
Scottish Christian	0	-	-	-	-	0.1	58	-0.2

Note: "Votes" are the first preference votes. The net gain/loss and percentage changes relate to the result of the previous Scottish local elections on 3 May 2007. This may differ from other published sources showing gain/loss relative to seats held at dissolution of Scotland's councils.

== Ward results ==
=== Kilsyth ===
- 2007: 2xLab; 1xSNP
- 2012: 2xLab; 1xSNP
- 2007-2012: No change

Kilsyth - 3 seats
Party	Candidate	FPv%	Count				
Party	Candidate	FPv%	1	2	3	4	5
Labour	Jean Jones (incumbent)	43.0%	1,544				
SNP	Alan Stevenson	21.5%	771	789.8	842.4	876.9	928.3
Labour	Heather McVey	20.2%	724	1,290			
SNP	Scott Campbell	9.0%	324	338.2	363.2	371.2	403.7
Conservative	David Paterson	3.7%	132	135.3	152.9		
Scottish Socialist	Wullie O'Neill	2.7%	98	108.9	172.7	185.4	
Electorate: 9,302 Valid: 3,593 Spoilt: 98 Quota: 899 Turnout: 3,691 (39.68%)

=== Cumbernauld North ===
- 2007: 2xLab; 1xSNP; 1xIndependent
- 2012: 2xLab; 1xCICA; 1xSNP;
- 2007-2012 Change: CICA gain one seat from Independent

Cumbernauld North - 4 seats
Party	Candidate	FPv%	Count						
Party	Candidate	FPv%	1	2	3	4	5	6	7
Cumbernauld Independent Councillors Alliance	Alan O'Brien (incumbent)	24.3%	1,309						
Labour	Barry McCulloch (incumbent)	18.0%	971	995.9	1,005.9	1,039.5	1,054.1	1,060.9	1,154.6
Labour	Bob Chadha (incumbent)	17.9%	962	985.4	996.2	1,028.4	1,036.5	1,045.7	1,143.2
SNP	Alan Masterton	17.5%	943	969.2	979.9	999	1,250.7		
SNP	Andrew Roberts	10.9%	588	616.4	620.4	634.4	708.1	853.9	
SNP	Kevin McMail	6.4%	344	356.4	362.3	365.8			
Conservative	Arthur Pawson	4.0%	216	240.1	244.2				
Scottish Socialist	John Miller	1.0%	50	63.6					
Electorate: 13,446 Valid: 5,383 Spoilt: 87 Quota: 1,077 Turnout: 5,470 (40.68%)

=== Cumbernauld South ===
- 2007: 2xLab; 2xSNP
- 2012: 2xSNP; 2xLab
- 2007-2012 Change: No change

Cumbernauld South - 4 seats
Party	Candidate	FPv%	Count							
Party	Candidate	FPv%	1	2	3	4	5	6	7	8
SNP	William Goldie (incumbent)	29.6%	1,779							
Labour	Allan Graham	23.5%	1,413							
Labour	Stephanie Muir	16.9%	1,017	1,044.5	1,210.4					
SNP	William Homer (incumbent)	10.9%	653	783.6	792.5	792.9	819.2	832.5	916.9	
SNP	Paddy Hogg	7.4%	444	810.2	815.8	816.3	836.4	857.6	926.4	1,594.8
Cumbernauld Independent Councillors Alliance	Donald Masterton	5.7%	344	358.5	363.1	363.7	392.9	486.3		
Conservative	David McArthur	3.7%	225	228.9	232.1	232.4	235.8			
Scottish Socialist	Kevin McVey	2.3%	140	147.8	152.3	153.1				
Electorate: 14,867 Valid: 6,015 Spoilt: 131 Quota: 1,204 Turnout: 6,146 (41.34%)

=== Abronhill, Kildrum and the Village ===
- 2007: 2xSNP; 1xLab
- 2012: 2xSNP; 1xLab
- 2007-2012 Change: No change

Abronhill, Kildrum and the Village - 3 seats
Party	Candidate	FPv%	Count
Party	Candidate	FPv%	1
Labour	Stevie Grant (incumbent)	32.2%	1,449
SNP	Elizabeth Irvine (incumbent)	31.1%	1,399
SNP	Tom Johnston (incumbent)	26.0%	1,168
Cumbernauld Independent Councillors Alliance	Adam Smith	5.4%	241
Conservative	Ruth Hogg	3.3%	150
Scottish Socialist	Andy Locke	2.0%	91
Electorate: 11,251 Valid: 4,498 Spoilt: 88 Quota: 1,125 Turnout: 4,586 (40.76%)

=== Strathkelvin ===
- 2007: 3xLab; 1xSNP
- 2012: 3xLab; 1xSNP
- 2007-2012 Change: No change

Strathkelvin - 4 seats
Party	Candidate	FPv%	Count					
Party	Candidate	FPv%	1	2	3	4	5	6
Labour	William Hogg (incumbent)	22.6%	1,418					
SNP	Frances McGlinchey (incumbent) †	19.9%	1,245	1,255.2				
Labour	Brian Wallace (incumbent)	15.4%	947	962.9	963	1,007.4	1,109.9	1,226
Labour	John McLaren	14.0%	865	976.6	976.7	1,058.9	1,144.8	1,351.7
SNP	June McHugh	13.3%	821	829.7	831.6	898.9	1,008.1	
Conservative	Andrew Polson	10.3%	635	637.7	637.7	682.7		
Independent	Joe Shaw (incumbent)	5.4%	330	333.7	333.7			
Electorate: 15,534 Valid: 6,261 Spoilt: 88 Quota: 1,253 Turnout: 6,394 (41.16%)

=== Coatbridge North and Glenboig ===
- 2007: 2xLab; 1xSNP; 1xIndependent
- 2012: 2xLab; 2xSNP
- 2007-2012 Change: SNP gain one seat from Independent

Coatbridge North and Glenboig - 4 seats
Party	Candidate	FPv%	Count				
Party	Candidate	FPv%	1	2	3	4	5
Labour	Michael McPake (incumbent)	33.0%	1,599				
Labour	Bill Shields (incumbent)	20.0%	900	1,467.8			
SNP	Fulton James MacGregor††††††††	15.8%	765	777.6	810.2	841.1	947.4
SNP	Julie McAnulty	15.0%	725	752.2	818.1	840.1	1,038.2
Independent	Martin McWilliams (incumbent)	10.2%	496	540.1	651.4	768	
Conservative	William Millar	6.0%	289	291.4	313.5		
Electorate: 14,277 Valid: 4,841 Spoilt: 99 Quota: 969 Turnout: 4,940 (34.6%)

=== Airdrie North ===
- 2007: 2xSNP; 2xLab
- 2012: 2xSNP; 2xLab
- 2007-2012 Change: No change

Airdrie North - 4 seats
Party	Candidate	FPv%	Count					
Party	Candidate	FPv%	1	2	3	4	5	6
Labour	Tommy Morgan (incumbent)	30.0%	1,552					
SNP	Alan Beveridge††††	20.3%	1,050					
SNP	Sophia Coyle (incumbent)	20.1%	1,040					
Labour	Andrew Spowart	10.6%	547	954.3	954.9	955.2	1,005.5	1,072.3
SNP	Patrick Rolink	7.3%	379	402.9	412.7	415.6	432.7	
Independent	Campbell Cameron (incumbent)	6.0%	312	326.6	327.8	328	459.2	493.4
Conservative	Ashley Baird	5.7%	297	304.6	305	305.2		
Electorate: 14,755 Valid: 5,177 Spoilt: 117 Quota: 1,036 Turnout: 5,294 (35.88%)

=== Airdrie Central ===
- 2007: 1xSNP; 1xLab; 1xIndependent
- 2012: 2xLab; 1xSNP
- 2007-2012 Change: Lab gain one seat from Independent

Airdrie Central - 3 seats
Party	Candidate	FPv%	Count				
Party	Candidate	FPv%	1	2	3	4	5
Labour	Jim Logue (incumbent)	31.7%	1,351				
SNP	David Stocks (incumbent)	22.2%	945	959.7	983.9	1,058.3	1,759.9
SNP	Graham Russell	16.9%	721	737.6	754.8	832.5	
Labour	Peter Sullivan *	14.8%	630	825.9	857.9	995.3	1,042.9
Independent	George Devine (incumbent)	9.8%	419	436	497.4		
Conservative	Christine Young	4.6%	198	201.8			
Electorate: 11,965 Valid: 4,264 Spoilt: 96 Quota: 1,067 Turnout: 4,360 (36.44%)

- Sitting Councillor for a different Ward.

=== Coatbridge West ===
- 2007: 2xLab; 1xSNP
- 2012: 2xLab; 1xSNP
- 2007-2012 Change: No change

Coatbridge West - 3 seats
Party	Candidate	FPv%	Count	
Party	Candidate	FPv%	1	2
Labour	Tom Maginnis (incumbent) ††	41.0%	1,570	
Labour	Jim Smith (incumbent)†††††††	33.8%	1,295	
SNP	Paul Welsh (incumbent)	22.4%	858	1,037.3
Conservative	Archie Giggie	2.8%	107	145.6
Electorate: 11,272 Valid: 3,830 Spoilt: 105 Quota: 958 Turnout: 3,935 (34.91%)

=== Coatbridge South ===
- 2007: 2xLab; 1xSNP
- 2012: 2xLab; 1xSNP
- 2007-2012 Change: No change

Coatbridge South - 3 seats
Party	Candidate	FPv%	Count				
Party	Candidate	FPv%	1	2	3	4	5
Labour	Jim Brooks (incumbent)	40.8%	1,568				
SNP	Imtiaz Majid	21.5%	827	848.6	900.3	951.6	1,389
Labour	John Higgins (incumbent)	21.2%	814	1,324.1			
SNP	Gerry Somers	12.1%	466	479.9	529.1	559.9	
Conservative	Colin Gibson	4.4%	171	186.1	208.2		
Electorate: 11,130 Valid: 3,846 Spoilt: 122 Quota: 962 Turnout: 3,968 (35.65%)

=== Airdrie South ===
- 2007: 2xLab; 1xSNP; 1xLib Dem
- 2012: 2xLab; 2xSNP
- 2007-2012 Change: SNP gain one seat from Lib Dem

Airdrie South - 4 seats
Party	Candidate	FPv%	Count							
Party	Candidate	FPv%	1	2	3	4	5	6	7	8
Labour	Tom Curley (incumbent)†††††††††††	27.3%	1,488							
SNP	Michael Coyle (incumbent)	21.2%	1,155							
Labour	David Fagan (incumbent)††††††††††	17.6%	959	1,290.9						
SNP	Agnes Coyle	14.2%	771	784.4	804.7	853.7	877.6	910.9	945.3	1,351.7
SNP	Nancy Pettigrew	7.5%	407	411.8	418.9	425.7	446.9	490.3	540.5	
Conservative	Eric Young	4.7%	254	257.2	262.5	262.9	267.1	384.2		
Liberal Democrats	John Love (incumbent)	4.1%	224	229.9	248.4	250.8	296.2			
Independent	John McGeechan	3.5%	188	194.9	214.9	216.3				
Electorate: 14,560 Valid: 5,446 Spoilt: 116 Quota: 1,090 Turnout: 5,562 (38.2%)

=== Fortissat ===
- 2007: 1xLab; 1xIndependent; 1xSNP
- 2012: 1xIndependent; 1xSNP; 1xLab
- 2007-2012 Change: No change

Fortissat - 3 seats
Party	Candidate	FPv%	Count				
Party	Candidate	FPv%	1	2	3	4	5
Labour	Francis Fallan	23.0%	983	988	1,022	1,023.4	
Labour	Jim Robertson (incumbent)	22.9%	982	1,000	1,046	1,048.3	1,843.2
Independent	Charlie Cefferty (incumbent)	22.9%	981	1,023	1,079		
SNP	Thomas Cochrane	16.2%	695	700	1,062	1,063.4	1,136.6
SNP	Malcolm McMillan (incumbent)	12.4%	529	543			
Conservative	Sandy Thornton	2.6%	111				
Electorate: 11,314 Valid: 4,281 Spoilt: 94 Quota: 1,071 Turnout: 4,375 (38.67%)

=== Thorniewood ===
- 2007: 2xLab; 1xSNP
- 2012: 2xLab; 1xSNP
- 2007-2012 Change: No change

Thorniewood - 3 seats
Party	Candidate	FPv%	Count	
Party	Candidate	FPv%	1	2
Labour	Bob Burrows (incumbent)	37.3%	1,623	
Labour	Jim McCabe (incumbent)	33.2%	1,443	
SNP	Duncan McShannon (incumbent)†††††	24.3%	1,057	1,220.5
Conservative	Alan Henderson	5.2%	225	304.8
Electorate: 11,668 Valid: 4,348 Spoilt: 80 Quota: 1,088 Turnout: 4,428 (37.95%)

=== Bellshill ===
- 2007: 2xLab; 1xSNP
- 2012: 2xLab; 1xSNP
- 2007-2012 Change: No change

Bellshill - 3 seats
Party	Candidate	FPv%	Count				
Party	Candidate	FPv%	1	2	3	4	5
Labour	Harry Curran (incumbent)	31.3%	1,208				
Labour	Harry McGuigan (incumbent)	23.8%	919	1,110.5			
SNP	Marina Lyle	17.2%	666	673.6	690.3	708.8	1,106.1
Independent	John Devlin	12.2%	471	483.4	508.2	567.6	588.9
SNP	Owen Gallagher	11.3%	437	444.6	453.6	473.5	
Conservative	Robert Hargrave	4.2%	164	166.6	174.5		
Electorate: 10,888 Valid: 3,865 Spoilt: 94 Quota: 967 Turnout: 3,959 (36.36%)

=== Mossend and Holytown ===
- 2007: 2xLab; 1xSNP
- 2012: 2xLab; 1xSNP
- 2007-2012 Change: No change

Mossend and Holytown - 3 seats
Party	Candidate	FPv%	Count				
Party	Candidate	FPv%	1	2	3	4	5
Labour	James Coyle (incumbent)	37.9%	1,281				
Labour	Frank McNally	22.0%	745	1,061.5			
SNP	David Baird	17.1%	578	602.4	621.8	642.4	944.3
SNP	Paul Delaney (incumbent)	10.2%	346	362.3	380.2	389.8	
Independent	Kevin McKeown (incumbent)	8.6%	291	310.4	358.7	417.1	449.9
Conservative	Rosemary Pawson	4.2%	141	147.5			
Electorate: 10,020 Valid: 3,382 Spoilt: 77 Quota: 846 Turnout: 3,459 (34.52%)

=== Motherwell West ===
- 2007: 2xLab; 1xSNP
- 2012: 2xLab; 1xSNP
- 2007-2012 Change: No change

Motherwell West - 3 seats
Party	Candidate	FPv%	Count		
Party	Candidate	FPv%	1	2	3
SNP	Annette Valentine (incumbent)	32.1%	1,256		
Labour	Paul Kelly (incumbent)	29.5%	1,156		
Labour	Michael Ross (incumbent)	22.3%	874	949.4	1,098.9
Conservative	Robert Burgess	13.7%	535	579.4	583.7
TUSC	Kenny Martin	2.4%	95	152.1	156.4
Electorate: 10,511 Valid: 3,916 Spoilt: 74 Quota: 980 Turnout: 3,990 (37.96%)

=== Motherwell North ===
- 2007: 3xLab; 1xSNP
- 2012: 3xLab; 1xSNP
- 2007-2012 Change: No change

Motherwell North - 4 seats
Party	Candidate	FPv%	Count						
Party	Candidate	FPv%	1	2	3	4	5	6	7
Labour	Peter Nolan (incumbent)†††††††	31.1%	1,548						
Labour	Helen McKenna (incumbent)†††††††	18.9%	941	1,329.3					
Labour	Annita McAuley (incumbent)†††	18.0%	897	965.6	1,244.8				
SNP	Shahid Farooq	13.9%	689	709.4	721.9	736.1	757.9	782.6	1,304.8
SNP	Gordon Stewart (incumbent)	11.5%	572	588.1	596.9	612.1	631.9	691.5	
Conservative	Neil Richardson	4.4%	217	224.1	228.1	235.8	278		
Liberal Democrats	Fraser MacGregor	2.2%	109	115.1	118.3	130.2			
Electorate: 13,573 Valid: 4,973 Spoilt: 87 Quota: 995 Turnout: 5,060 (37.28%)

=== Motherwell South East and Ravenscraig ===
- 2007: 2xLab; 1xSNP; 1xCon
- 2012: 3xLab; 1xSNP
- 2007-2012 Change: Lab gain one seat from Con

Motherwell South East and Ravenscraig - 4 seats
Party	Candidate	FPv%	Count							
Party	Candidate	FPv%	1	2	3	4	5	6	7	8
Labour	Kaye Harmon (incumbent)	20.9%	944							
SNP	Alan Valentine (incumbent)	19.6%	885	886.7	897.7	934.8				
Labour	Tommy Lunny (incumbent)	14.5%	654	675.4	683.5	706.8	707.9	740.9	794.9	921.6
Labour	Gary O'Rorke†††††††††	14.0%	633	641.9	644.9	674.2	675.9	701.2	742.4	821.2
SNP	Jamie Super	12.2%	550	550.8	551.8	565.8	588.4	623.7	694.2	
Conservative	Linsey McKay (incumbent)	6.9%	311	312	324	333	333.9			
Independent	Ian Kelly	5.5%	247	248.8	259.8	337.9	339.5	427		
Independent	Hugh McLaughlin	5.2%	236	236.8	240.8					
Scottish Christian	Brian Ross	1.3%	58	58.3						
Electorate: 13,218 Valid: 4,518 Spoilt: 124 Quota: 904 Turnout: 4,642 (35.12%)

=== Murdostoun ===
- 2007: 2xLab; 1xSNP; 1xIndependent
- 2012: 2xLab; 1xIndependent; 1xSNP
- 2007-2012 Change: No change

Murdostoun - 4 seats
Party	Candidate	FPv%	Count					
Party	Candidate	FPv%	1	2	3	4	5	6
Independent	Robert McKendrick (incumbent)	32.1%	1,751					
Labour	Nicky Shevlin (incumbent)	21.6%	1,178					
Labour	Alan Clinch	14.5%	789	982.1	1,045.4	1,111.3		
SNP	John Taggart (incumbent)††††	13.4%	729	860.7	867.5	925.7	927.8	1,566.7
SNP	Lyall Duff	12.7%	691	739.9	743.1	779.7	782.9	
Conservative	Cindy MacKenzie	5.9%	321	369.5	371.4			
Electorate: 14,401 Valid: 5,459 Spoilt: 110 Quota: 1,092 Turnout: 5,569 (38.67%)

=== Wishaw ===
- 2007: 3xLab; 1xSNP
- 2012: 2xLab; 2xSNP
- 2007-2012 Change: SNP gain one seat from Lab

Wishaw - 4 seats
Party	Candidate	FPv%	Count					
Party	Candidate	FPv%	1	2	3	4	5	6
Labour	Sam Love (incumbent)†††††††	30.5%	1,590					
SNP	Marion Fellows††††††	21.5%	1,118					
Labour	Frank McKay (incumbent)†††††††††	17.9%	932	1,296.9				
SNP	Jim Hume	12.9%	674	701.9	712.2	780.2	888.7	1,020.9
Labour	James Robertson	9.3%	482	558.5	767.8	769.2	837.2	
Conservative	Marjory Borthwick	7.9%	412	428.9	432.7	434.6		
Electorate: 14,299 Valid: 5,208 Spoilt: 124 Quota: 1,042 Turnout: 5,332 (37.29%)

== Changes Since Election ==
- † Strathkelvin Scottish National Party Cllr Frances McGlinchey resigned from the party on 24 October 2012 in protest at the vote to overturn its long-standing opposition to Nato.
- †† Coatbridge West Labour Party Cllr Tom Maginnis died on 29 November 2012. A by-election was held on 28 February 2013 and the seat was retained by Labour's Kevin Docherty.
- ††† Motherwell North Labour Party Cllr Annita McAuley died on 23 October 2013. A by-election was held on 23 January 2014 and the seat was retained by Labour's Pat O'Rourke.
- †††† Airdrie North and Murdostoun SNP Cllrs Alan Beveridge and John Taggart resigned from the party and became Independents on 10 February 2015 in opposition to the party's 2015 Westminster Election selection procedures.
- ††††† Thorniewood SNP Cllr Duncan McShannon resigned his seat in May 2015. A by-election was held on 9 July 2015 and the seat was held by the party's Stephen Bonnar.
- †††††† Wishaw SNP Cllr Marion Fellows was elected as an MP for Motherwell and Wishaw on 7 May 2015. She resigned her Council seat on 25 May 2015 and a by-election was held 13 August 2015 and the seat was held by the party's Rosa Zambonini.
- ††††††† On 8 March 2016 Labour Party Motherwell North Cllrs Helen McKenna and Peter Nolan, Wishaw Cllr Sam Love and Coatbridge West Cllr Jim Smith resigned from the party and became Independents.
- †††††††† Coatbridge North and Glenboig Cllr Fulton James McGregor was elected as a MSP for Coatbridge and Chryston in the 2016 Scottish Parliament election. On 29 June 2016 he resigned his council seat. A by-election was held on 22 September 2016 which was won by Labour's Alex McVey.
- ††††††††† Motherwell South East and Ravenscraig and Wishaw Labour Party Cllrs Gary O'Rorke and Frank McKay resigned from the party and became Independents on 21 November 2016.
- †††††††††† Airdrie South Labour Cllr David Fagan was suspended from the party on 4 October 2016 over allegations of possession of child pornography.
- ††††††††††† Airdrie South Labour Cllr Tom Curley resigned from the party on 29 October 2016 and announced he would stand as an Independent in 2016.

== By-elections since 2012 ==
Coatbridge West By-election (28 February 2013) - 1 Seat
Party	Candidate	FPv%	Count
Party	Candidate	FPv%	1
Labour	Kevin Docherty	78.8%	2,145
SNP	Patrick Rolink	16.6%	452
Conservative	Ashley Baird	2.6%	71
UKIP	Billy Mitchell	1.2%	34
Liberal Democrats	John Love	0.7%	19
Electorate: Valid: 2,721 Spoilt: 27 Quota: 1,361 Turnout: 2,748 (24.11%)

Motherwell North By-election (23 January 2014) - 1 Seat
Party	Candidate	FPv%	Count
Party	Candidate	FPv%	1
Labour	Pat O'Rourke	68.2	1,719
SNP	Jordan Linden	20.6	520
Conservative	Bob Burgess	6.9	173
UKIP	Neil Wilson	4.2	107
Electorate: Valid: 2,519 Spoilt: 38 Quota: 1,260 Turnout: 2,557 (18.4%)

Thorniewood By-election (09 July 2015) - 1 Seat
Party	Candidate	FPv%	Count					
Party	Candidate	FPv%	1	2	3	4	5	6
SNP	Steven Bonnar	47.01%	1,555	1,556	1,565	1,586	1,622	1,647
Labour	Hugh Gaffney	42.62%	1,410	1,417	1,422	1,433	1,456	1,517
Conservative	Meghan Gallacher	4.5%	149	158	167	172	175	
Scottish Socialist	Liam McCabe	2.45%	81	81	82	89		
Green	Patrick McAleer	1.54%	51	55	61			
Scottish Christian	Craig Smith	1.0%	33	37				
UKIP	Matt Williams	0.88%	29					
Electorate: 11,730 Valid: 3,308 (28.2%) Spoilt: 38 Quota: 1,655 Turnout: 3,346 (28.5%)

Wishaw By-election (13 August 2015) - 1 Seat
Party	Candidate	FPv%	Count
Party	Candidate	FPv%	1
SNP	Rosa Zambonini	51.1%	1,915
Labour	Peter McDade	32.8%	1,230
Conservative	Marjory Borthwick	10.3%	385
Scottish Socialist	Maria Feeney	3.1%	117
UKIP	Neil Wilson	1.8%	67
Liberal Democrats	Gerard Neary	1.0%	37
Electorate: 14,592 Valid: 3,751 Spoilt: 43 Quota: 1,876 Turnout: 3,794 (26.1%)

Coatbridge North and Glenboig By-election (22 September 2016) - 1 Seat
Party	Candidate	FPv%	Count
Party	Candidate	FPv%	1
Labour	Alex McVey	41.7	1,350
SNP	Stephen Kirley	39.0	1,261
Conservative	Ben Callaghan	11.3	366
Green	John Wilson	6.0	195
UKIP	Neil Wilson	1.9	63
Electorate: Valid: 3,235 Spoilt: 42 Quota: 1,618 Turnout: 3,277 (23.67%)
