= Motherwell and Wishaw =

Motherwell and Wishaw may mean or refer to:

- Motherwell and Wishaw (UK Parliament constituency)
- Motherwell and Wishaw (Scottish Parliament constituency)
