= Muirhouse, North Lanarkshire =

Suburb of Motherwell, Scotland

Coordinates: 55.77346°N 3.96632°W

Muirhouse
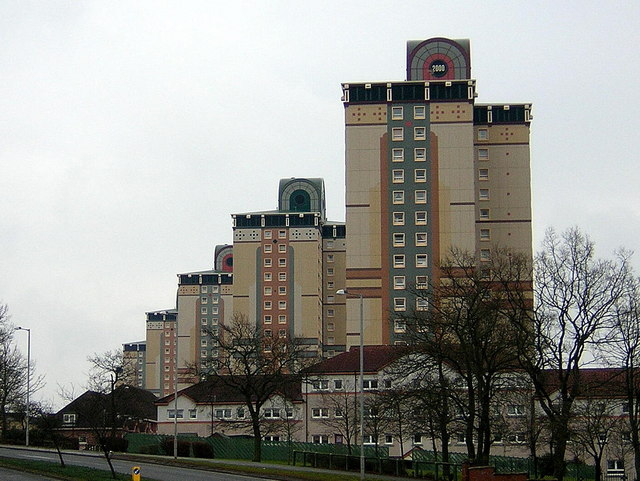
- Tower Blocks in Muirhouse

- Location within North Lanarkshire
- OS grid reference: NS766553
- Council area: North Lanarkshire
- Lieutenancy area: Lanarkshire
- Country: Scotland
- Sovereign state: United Kingdom
- Post town: MOTHERWELL
- Postcode district: ML1 2
- Dialling code: 01698
- Police: Scotland
- Fire: Scottish
- Ambulance: Scottish
- UK Parliament: Motherwell and Wishaw
- Scottish Parliament: Motherwell and Wishaw Central Scotland

Muirhouse is a residential suburb in the south-east of Motherwell, North Lanarkshire, Scotland, coming under the Motherwell South East & Ravenscraig council ward and bordering the Flemington neighbourhood in the town, plus the Craigneuk and Netherton areas of Wishaw. It consists of thirteen tower blocks (each over 52 metres (171 ft) high with at least 18 floors, constructed between 1963 and 1970), amidst low rise flats and numerous houses.

The area has two Roman Catholic schools (one being the nearby Our Lady's High School), a non-denominational school, a community centre, several small shopping area, two takeaway shops, tanning salon, dog groomers, delicatessen and a pub. Muirhouse is surrounded by countryside, including the Dalzell Estate, and has many walking routes into Motherwell town centre. The nearest train station is Sheildmuir, located on the north-eastern edge of the suburb.

== Regeneration and upgrades ==
The area has seen regeneration with the demolition of several low-rise flats replaced with housing and green areas. The tower blocks have seen substantial upgrades over the years. Most obviously, new overcladding was applied to the exteriors between 1997 and 2000 (with the first blocks to be upgraded being Grange and Merryton and the last being Shields and Muirhouse). Other work included the enclosing of external balconies and the installation of CCTV inside and outside the blocks. North Lanarkshire Council has also been upgrading the interior of the flats by replacing dated bathrooms and kitchens.

Currently the council are testing the cladding on the side of each tower to check flammability. The local fire service are currently inspecting the towers' safety.

In 2017, it was reported that the council planned to demolish all the towers in its control over the next 25 years and replace them with modern housing, due to the rising costs of maintenance as the buildings aged, as well as some of the flats being unpopular and underoccupied (although this was not a major issue in Muirhouse).

== Tower blocks ==
- Northern cluster:
  - Burnside Tower (17 Floors)
  - Doonside Tower (19 Floors)
  - Glassford Tower (17 Floors)
  - Glen Tower (17 Floors)
  - Lodge Tower (17 Floors)
  - Woodside Tower (17 Floors)
- Southern cluster:
  - Barons Tower
  - Dalziel Tower
  - Grange Tower
  - Merryton Tower
  - Muirhouse Tower
  - Netherwood Tower
  - Shields Tower
