= Motherwell and Wishaw (UK Parliament constituency) =

UK Parliament constituency (1997–2024)

- Former burgh constituency for the House of Commons
- Boundary of Motherwell and Wishaw in Scotland
- Subdivision: North Lanarkshire
- Major settlements: Carfin, Cleland, Holytown, Motherwell, Wishaw

1997–2024
- Created from: Motherwell North; Motherwell South
- Replaced by: Motherwell, Wishaw and Carluke

1974–1983
- Seats: One
- Type of constituency: Burgh constituency
- Created from: Motherwell
- Replaced by: Motherwell South

Motherwell and Wishaw was a burgh constituency of the House of Commons of the Parliament of the United Kingdom. It was first created in 1974, mostly from the former Motherwell constituency. In 1983, it was split into two constituencies, Motherwell North and Motherwell South; but they became one constituency again, in 1997.

The corresponding Scottish Parliamentary seat of the same name Motherwell and Wishaw was held by Jack McConnell, the former First Minister of Scotland 2001-07.

Further to the completion of the 2023 Periodic Review of Westminster constituencies, the seat was abolished. Subject to boundary change, including expansion into South Lanarkshire, incorporating the town of Carluke, it was reformed as Motherwell, Wishaw and Carluke, and first contested at the 2024 general election.

== Constituency profile ==
The seat was situated in the south-west of the North Lanarkshire council area, and is dominated by the towns of Motherwell and Wishaw. Residents' wealth and health are around average for the UK.

== Boundaries ==
Map of boundaries 2005–2024

1974–1983: The burgh of Motherwell and Wishaw.

1997–2005: The Motherwell District electoral divisions of Clydevale, Dalziel, and Wishaw.

2005–2024: The North Lanarkshire electoral divisions of:

- In full: Motherwell South East and Ravenscraig, Motherwell West, Wishaw
- In part: Bellshill, Mossend and Holytown, Motherwell North, Murdostoun.

In the boundary changes for 2005, small parts of Hamilton North and Bellshill and Airdrie and Shotts were added to this seat.

== Members of Parliament ==
Election	Member	Party
Feb 1974	George Lawson	Labour
Oct 1974	Jeremy Bray	Labour
1983	Constituency abolished	
1997	Frank Roy	Labour
2015	Marion Fellows	SNP

== Elections ==
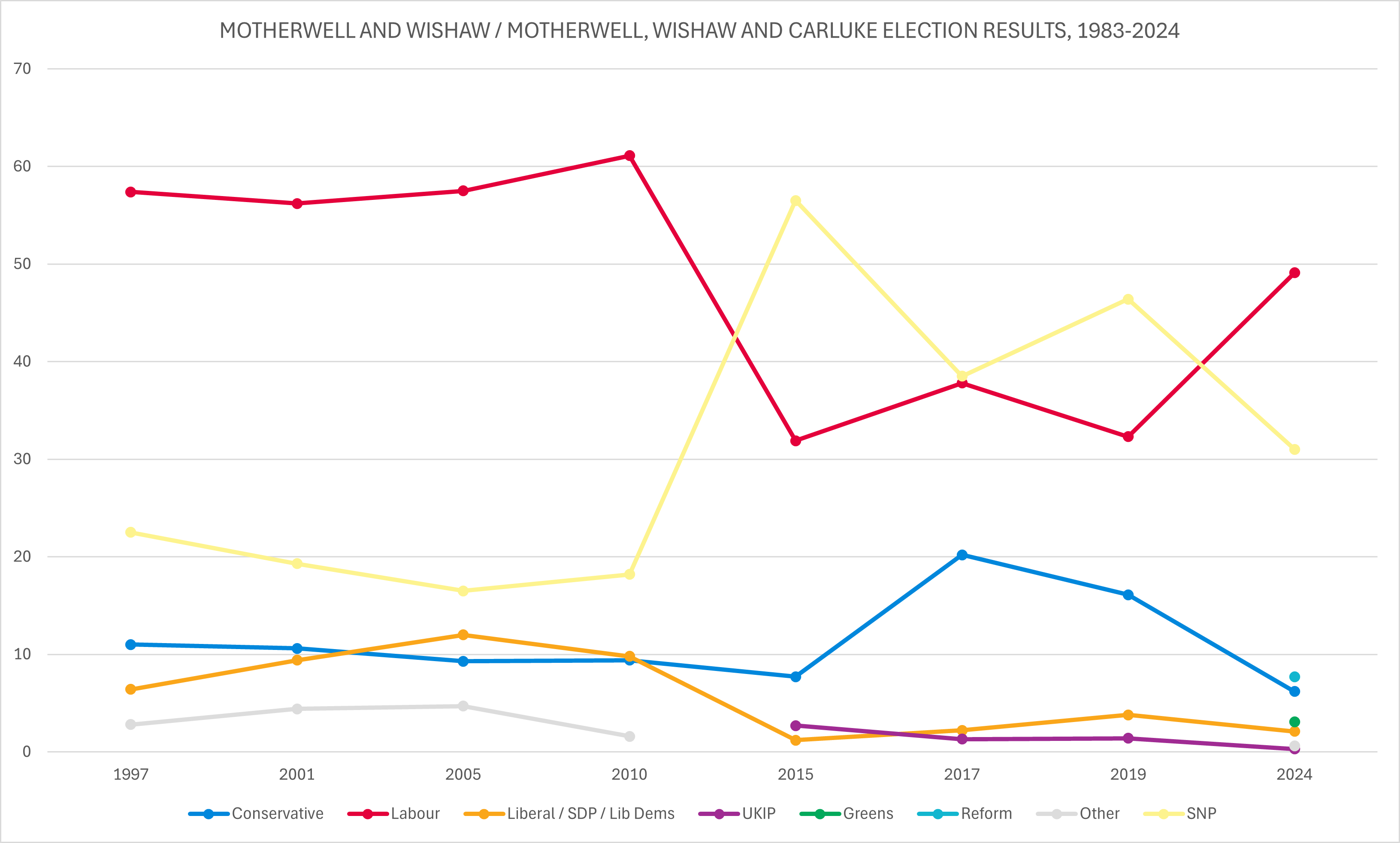
Election results 1950-2024

=== Elections of the 2010s ===
General election 2019: Motherwell and Wishaw
Party	Candidate	Votes	%	±%
SNP	Marion Fellows	20,622	46.4	+7.9
Labour	Angela Feeney	14,354	32.3	−5.5
Conservative	Meghan Gallacher	7,150	16.1	−4.1
Liberal Democrats	Christopher Wilson	1,675	3.8	+1.6
UKIP	Neil Wilson	619	1.4	+0.1
Majority		6,268	14.1	+13.4
Turnout		44,420	64.6	+3.1
SNP hold		Swing	+6.7	

General election 2017: Motherwell and Wishaw
Party	Candidate	Votes	%	±%
SNP	Marion Fellows	16,150	38.5	−18.0
Labour	Angela Feeney	15,832	37.8	+5.9
Conservative	Meghan Gallacher	8,490	20.2	+12.5
Liberal Democrats	Yvonne Finlayson	920	2.2	+1.0
UKIP	Neil Wilson	534	1.3	−1.4
Majority		318	0.7	−23.9
Turnout		41,926	61.5	−7.1
SNP hold		Swing	-12.0	

General election 2015: Motherwell and Wishaw
Party	Candidate	Votes	%	±%
SNP	Marion Fellows	27,275	56.5	+38.3
Labour	Frank Roy	15,377	31.9	−29.2
Conservative	Meghan Gallacher	3,695	7.7	−1.7
UKIP	Neil Wilson	1,289	2.7	New
Liberal Democrats	Ross Laird	601	1.2	−8.6
Majority		11,898	24.6	N/A
Turnout		48,237	68.6	+10.1
SNP gain from Labour		Swing	+33.7	

General election 2010: Motherwell and Wishaw
Party	Candidate	Votes	%	±%
Labour	Frank Roy	23,910	61.1	+3.6
SNP	Marion Fellows	7,104	18.2	+1.7
Liberal Democrats	Stuart Douglas	3,840	9.8	−2.2
Conservative	Patsy Gilroy	3,660	9.4	+0.1
TUSC	Ray Gunnion	609	1.6	New
Majority		16,806	42.9	+1.9
Turnout		39,123	58.5	+3.1
Labour hold		Swing	+1.0	

=== Elections of the 2000s ===
General election 2005: Motherwell and Wishaw (new boundaries)
Party	Candidate	Votes	%	±%
Labour	Frank Roy	21,327	57.5	+0.7
SNP	Ian MacQuarrie	6,105	16.5	−4.0
Liberal Democrats	Conor Snowden	4,464	12.0	+3.3
Conservative	Peter Finnie	3,440	9.3	−0.1
Scottish Socialist	Gregor J. MacEwan	1,019	2.7	−1.4
Free Scotland Party	Dallas E. Carter	384	1.0	New
Christian Vote	Coral G. Thompson	370	1.0	New
Majority		15,222	41.0	+4.7
Turnout		37,109	55.4	
Labour hold		Swing		

General election 2001: Motherwell and Wishaw
Party	Candidate	Votes	%	±%
Labour	Frank Roy	16,681	56.2	−1.2
SNP	James A. McGuigan	5,725	19.3	−3.2
Conservative	Mark Nolan	3,155	10.6	−0.4
Liberal Democrats	Iain Brown	2,791	9.4	+3.0
Scottish Socialist	Stephen Smellie	1,260	4.2	New
Socialist Labour	Claire Watt	61	0.2	−2.0
Majority		10,956	36.9	+2.0
Turnout		29,673	56.6	−13.5
Labour hold		Swing		

=== Elections of the 1990s ===
General election 1997: Motherwell and Wishaw
Party	Candidate	Votes	%	±%
Labour	Frank Roy	21,020	57.4	N/A
SNP	James A. McGuigan	8,229	22.5	N/A
Conservative	Scott Dickson	4,024	11.0	N/A
Liberal Democrats	Alex G. Mackie	2,331	6.4	N/A
Socialist Labour	Christopher Herriot	797	2.2	N/A
Referendum	Thomas Russell	218	0.6	N/A
Majority		12,791	34.9	N/A
Turnout		36,619	70.1	N/A
Labour win (new seat)				

=== Elections of the 1970s ===
General election 1979: Motherwell and Wishaw
Party	Candidate	Votes	%	±%
Labour	Jeremy Bray	22,263	56.9	+12.3
Conservative	John Thomson	11,326	28.9	+10.7
SNP	James MacKay	4,817	12.3	−19.5
Communist	James Wotherspoon Sneddon	740	1.9	−0.5
Majority		10,937	28.0	+15.2
Turnout		39,146	77.8	+2.4
Labour hold		Swing	+0.8	

General election October 1974: Motherwell and Wishaw
Party	Candidate	Votes	%	±%
Labour	Jeremy Bray	17,319	44.6	−2.1
SNP	James MacKay	12,357	31.8	+11.8
Conservative	James Rae	7,069	18.2	−12.4
Liberal	David Young	1,126	2.9	New
Communist	James Wotherspoon Sneddon	946	2.4	−0.3
Majority		4,962	12.8	−3.3
Turnout		38,817	75.4	−1.7
Labour hold		Swing	−6.9	

General election February 1974: Motherwell and Wishaw
Party	Candidate	Votes	%	±%
Labour	George Lawson	18,310	46.7	N/A
Conservative	James Caldwell	11,997	30.6	N/A
SNP	George Nicholson	7,852	20.0	N/A
Communist	James Wotherspoon Sneddon	1,066	2.7	N/A
Majority		6,313	16.1	N/A
Turnout		39,225	77.1	N/A
Labour win (new seat)				
