= Cumbernauld South (ward) =

Electoral ward in North Lanarkshire, Scotland

Location of the ward

Cumbernauld South is one of the twenty-one wards used to elect members of the North Lanarkshire Council. Created in 2007, it elects four Councillors and covers the south-western parts of Cumbernauld (Carbrain, Condorrat, Greenfaulds and Ravenswood). A 2017 review caused the loss of the town centre commercial area and the Seafar neighbourhood (excepting the McGregor Road area) with the population decreasing as a result – in 2019, this was 15,905.

== Councillors ==
Election	Councillors			
2007	William Goldie (SNP)	William Homer (SNP)	Danny Carrigan (Labour)	Gerry McElroy (Labour)
2012	William Goldie (SNP)	Paddy Hogg (SNP)	Allan Graham (Labour)	Stephanie Muir (Labour)
2017	William Goldie (SNP)	Catherine Johnston (SNP)	Allan Graham (Labour)	Junaid Ashraf (SNP)
2022	William Goldie (SNP)	Ann Ballinger (SNP)	James McPhilemy (Labour)	Peter McDade (Labour)

== Election results ==
=== 2017 Election ===
Cumbernauld South - 4 seats
Party	Candidate	FPv%	Count							
Party	Candidate	FPv%	1	2	3	4	5	6	7	8
SNP	William Goldie (incumbent)	19.36	1,146	1,151	1,178	1,233				
SNP	Catherine Johnston	17.4	1,030	1,033	1,075	1,093	1,122	1,149	1,181	1,224
Labour	Allan Graham (incumbent)	16.29	964	970	981	1,018	1,020	1,648		
SNP	Junaid Ashraf	14.12	836	840	880	907	920	943	972	1,026
Conservative	Colin Gibson	12.47	738	740	749	794	795	824	912	
Labour	Stephanie Griffin née Muir (incumbent)	12.28	727	742	763	790	791			
Independent	William Homer	3.78	224	227	262					
Green	Patrick McAleer	3.16	187	210						
Scottish Socialist	Kevin McVey	1.13	67							
Electorate: 12,752 Valid: 5,919 Spoilt: 189 Quota: 1,184 Turnout: 6,108 (47.9%)

=== 2012 Election ===
Cumbernauld South - 4 seats
Party	Candidate	FPv%	Count							
Party	Candidate	FPv%	1	2	3	4	5	6	7	8
SNP	William Goldie (incumbent)	29.6%	1,779							
Labour	Allan Graham	23.5%	1,413							
Labour	Stephanie Muir	16.9%	1,017	1,044.5	1,210.4					
SNP	William Homer (incumbent)	10.9%	653	783.6	792.5	792.9	819.2	832.5	916.9	
SNP	Paddy Hogg	7.4%	444	810.2	815.8	816.3	836.4	857.6	926.4	1,594.8
Cumbernauld Independent Councillors Alliance	Donald Masterton	5.7%	344	358.5	363.1	363.7	392.9	486.3		
Conservative	David McArthur	3.7%	225	228.9	232.1	232.4	235.8			
Scottish Socialist	Kevin McVey	2.3%	140	147.8	152.3	153.1				
Electorate: 14,867 Valid: 6,015 Spoilt: 131 Quota: 1,204 Turnout: 6,146 (41.34%)

=== 2007 Election ===
North Lanarkshire council election, 2007: Cumbernauld South
Party	Candidate	FPv%	%	Seat	Count
SNP	William Goldie	1,871	23.3	1	1
Labour	Danny Carrigan	1,806	22.5	1	2
Labour	Gerry McElroy	1,280	16.0	1	8
SNP	William Homer	791	9.9	1	10
SNP	Neil McCallum	701	8.7		
Independent	Alan Sneddon	370	4.6		
Liberal Democrats	Michael Allen	359	4.5		
Independent	Rose Bowie	318	4.0		
Conservative	Margaret Hooper	276	3.4		
Scottish Socialist	Kenny McEwan	252	3.1		
