= John Pentland =

Member of the Scottish Parliament (born 1946)

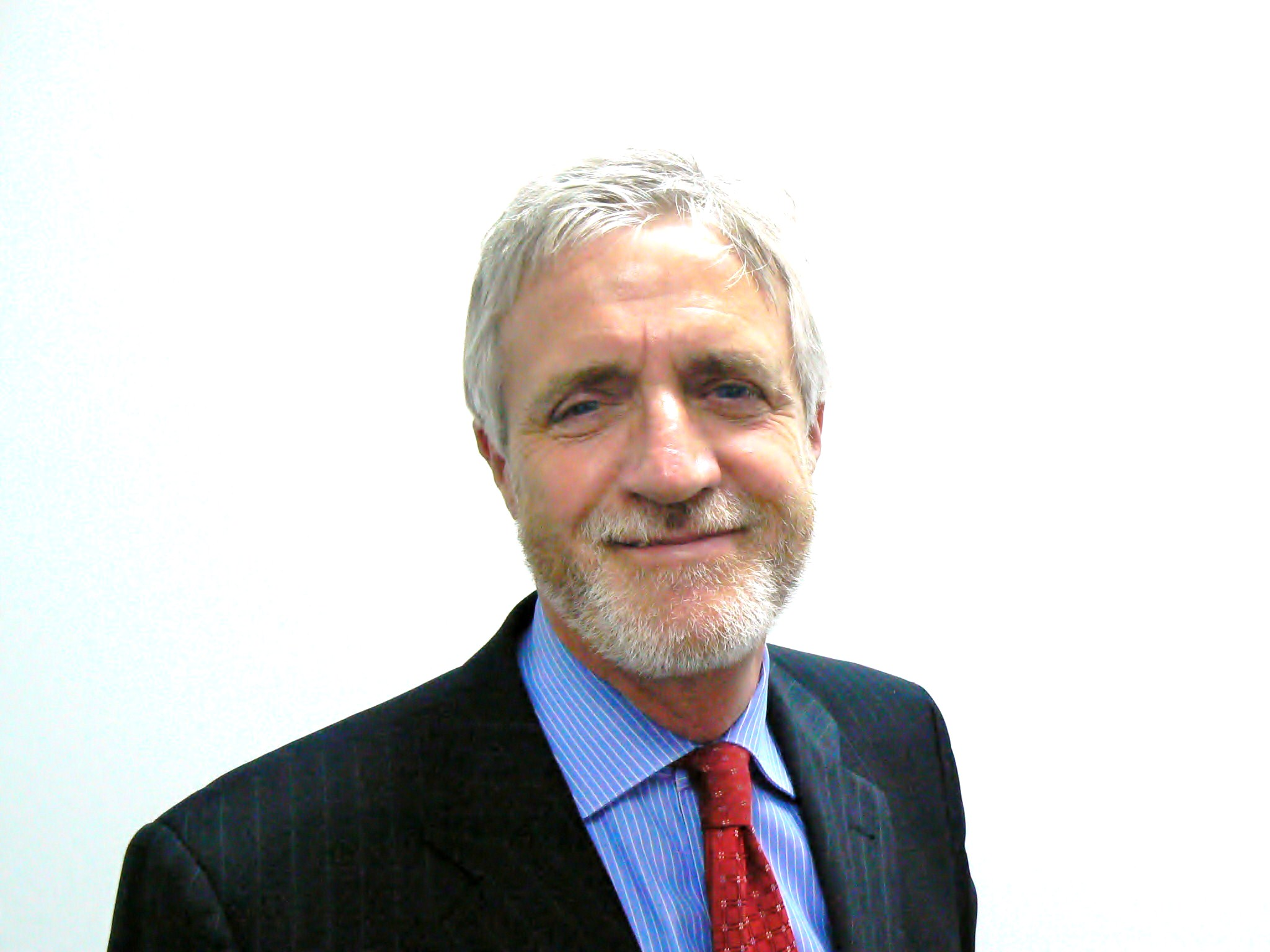

Member of the Scottish Parliament for Motherwell and Wishaw
- In office 5 May 2011 – 24 March 2016
- Preceded by: Jack McConnell
- Succeeded by: Clare Adamson

Personal details
- Party: Scottish Labour

John Williamson Pentland is a former Scottish Labour Party politician. He was the Member of the Scottish Parliament (MSP) for the Motherwell and Wishaw constituency from 2011 to 2016.

Pentland worked as a welder with Butters Brothers, Craigneuk and then spent 28 years with British Steel Corporation at the Clyde Alloy plant. He has been a member of the Labour Party for over 30 years, holding numerous branch and CLP positions. He was elected to the former Motherwell District Council in 1992, and served on Planning, Leisure Services, Environmental Health, Staffing, and Policy and Resources Committees. Prior to his election as an MSP, he was Convener of North Lanarkshire Council Finance Committee, he was also finance spokesperson for the Convention of Scottish Local Authorities from 2002 till 2007.

John Pentland was elected to the Scottish Parliament in the election of 5 May 2011.

Scottish Parliament
Preceded by Jack McConnell	Member of the Scottish Parliament for Motherwell and Wishaw; 2011–2016	Succeeded by Clare Adamson
