= Thorniewood =

Electoral ward in North Lanarkshire, Scotland

Location of the ward

Thorniewood is one of the twenty-one wards used to elect members of the North Lanarkshire Council. It elects three councillors and covers the Viewpark, Tannochside and Birkenshaw areas. Its south-west boundary is the M74 motorway bordering the Bothwell and Uddingston ward of South Lanarkshire (the localities of Thorniewood were often historically considered parts of Uddingston, particularly before the two parts were divided between the districts of Hamilton and Motherwell in 1975).

A 2017 national review caused the territory to be reduced, the east boundary moving westwards from the A725 bypass resulting in the loss of the Fallside neighbourhood and the unpopulated Righead Industrial Estate; however, housebuilding elsewhere meant the decrease in the electorate was minimal. The ward had a population of 13,950 in 2019.

== Councillors ==
| Election | Councillors | | |
|---|---|---|---|
| 2007 | Duncan McShannon (SNP) | Jim McCabe (Labour) | Bob Burrows (Labour) |
| 2012 | Duncan McShannon (SNP) | Jim McCabe (Labour) | Bob Burrows (Labour) |
| 2015 by- | Steven Bonnar (SNP) | Jim McCabe (Labour) | Bob Burrows (Labour) |
| 2017 | Steven Bonnar (SNP) | Hugh Gaffney (Labour) | Bob Burrows (Labour) |
| 2019 by- | Steven Bonnar (SNP) | Norah Mooney (Labour) | Bob Burrows (Labour) |
| 2021 by- | Helen Loughran (Labour) | Norah Mooney (Labour) | Bob Burrows (Labour) |
| 2022 | Helen Loughran (Labour) | Margaret Boyd (Labour) | Barry McCluskey (SNP) |

== Election results ==
=== 2017 Election ===
Thorniewood - 3 seats
| Party | Candidate | FPv% | Count | | | |
| Party | Candidate | FPv% | 1 | 2 | 3 | 4 |
|---|---|---|---|---|---|---|
| Labour | Bob Burrows (incumbent) | 33.48 | 1,568 | | | |
| SNP | Steven Bonnar (incumbent) | 31.17 | 1,460 | | | |
| Labour | Hugh Gaffney | 16.78 | 786 | 1,119 | 1,156 | 1,419 |
| Conservative | Christine McConnell | 11.08 | 519 | 536 | 540 | |
| SNP | Josh Robertson | 7.49 | 351 | 362 | 584 | 609 |
Electorate: 10,688 Valid: 4,684 Spoilt: 104 Quota: 1172 Turnout: 4,788 (44.8%)

==== 2019 By-election ====
- On 1 Jul 2019, Labour councillor Hugh Gaffney resigned his seat after he was elected as MP for Coatbridge, Chryston and Bellshill at the 2017 UK Parliament Election. A by-election was held on 19 September 2019 and the seat was retained by Labour by Norah Moody.

Thorniewood By-election (19 September 2019) - 1 Seat
| Party | Candidate | FPv% | Count |
| Party | Candidate | FPv% | 1 |
|---|---|---|---|
| Labour | Norah Moody | 44.3% | 1,362 |
| SNP | Eve Cunnington | 39.1% | 1,202 |
| Conservative | Lorraine Nolan | 9.6% | 296 |
| Liberal Democrats | Colin Robb | 5.5% | 168 |
| Green | Rosemary McGowan | 1.5% | 46 |

==== 2021 By-election ====
- SNP councillor Steven Bonnar was elected as MP for Coatbridge, Chryston and Bellshill at the 2019 UK Parliament Election. He resigned his Council seat and the by-election was set for May but was deferred until 19 November 2020. It was won by Helen Loughran for Labour.

Thorniewood By-election (4 March 2021) - 1 Seat
| Party | Candidate | FPv% | Count | | | | |
| Party | Candidate | FPv% | 1 | 2 | 3 | 4 | 5 |
|---|---|---|---|---|---|---|---|
| Labour | Helen Loughran | 36.4% | 998 | 999 | 1,018 | 1,112 | 1,263 |
| SNP | Eve Cunnington | 34.5% | 944 | 944 | 960 | 971 | 1,160 |
| Independent | Joseph Budd | 18.9% | 518 | | | | |
| Conservative | Oyebola Ajala | 7.7% | 212 | 215 | 220 | | |
| Green | Rosemary McGowan | 1.9% | 53 | 57 | | | |
| UKIP | Daryl Gardner | 0.5% | 15 | | | | |
Electorate: TBC Valid: 2,740 Spoilt: 29 Quota: 1,371 Turnout: 25.4%

=== 2012 Election ===
Thorniewood - 3 seats
| Party | Candidate | FPv% | Count | |
| Party | Candidate | FPv% | 1 | 2 |
|---|---|---|---|---|
| Labour | Bob Burrows (incumbent) | 37.3% | 1,623 | |
| Labour | Jim McCabe (incumbent) | 33.2% | 1,443 | |
| SNP | Duncan McShannon (incumbent) | 24.3% | 1,057 | 1,220.5 |
| Conservative | Alan Henderson | 5.2% | 225 | 304.8 |
Electorate: 11,668 Valid: 4,348 Spoilt: 80 Quota: 1,088 Turnout: 4,428 (37.95%)

==== 2015 By-election ====
Thorniewood By-election (9 July 2015) - 1 Seat
| Party | Candidate | FPv% | Count | | | | | |
| Party | Candidate | FPv% | 1 | 2 | 3 | 4 | 5 | 6 |
|---|---|---|---|---|---|---|---|---|
| SNP | Steven Bonnar | 47.01% | 1,555 | 1,556 | 1,565 | 1,586 | 1,622 | 1,647 |
| Labour | Hugh Gaffney | 42.62% | 1,410 | 1,417 | 1,422 | 1,433 | 1,456 | 1,517 |
| Conservative | Meghan Gallacher | 4.5% | 149 | 158 | 167 | 172 | 175 | |
| Scottish Socialist | Liam McCabe | 2.45% | 81 | 81 | 82 | 89 | | |
| Green | Patrick McAleer | 1.54% | 51 | 55 | 61 | | | |
| Scottish Christian | Craig Smith | 1% | 33 | 37 | | | | |
| UKIP | Matt Williams | 0.88% | 29 | | | | | |
Electorate: 11,730 Valid: 3,308 (28.2%) Spoilt: 38 Quota: 1,655 Turnout: 3,346 (28.5%)

- SNP Cllr Duncan McShannon resigned his seat in May 2015. A by-election was held on 9 July 2015 and the seat was held by the party's Stephen Bonnar.

=== 2007 Election ===
North Lanarkshire council election, 2007: Thorniewood
| Party | Candidate | FPv% | % | Seat | Count |
|---|---|---|---|---|---|
| Labour | Jim McCabe | 1,714 | 29.7 | 1 | 1 |
| SNP | Duncan McShannon | 1,369 | 23.8 | 1 | 4 |
| Labour | Bob Burrows | 1,342 | 23.3 | 1 | 2 |
| Labour | Dave Saunders | 878 | 15.2 | | |
| Conservative | David Imrie Paterson | 455 | 7.9 | | |
