= Cumbernauld East (ward) =

Electoral ward in North Lanarkshire, Scotland

Location of the ward

Cumbernauld East is one of the twenty-one wards used to elect members of the North Lanarkshire Council. It currently elects four councillors.

It was created in 2007 as Abronhill, Kildrum and the Village, covering those neighbourhoods within the town of Cumbernauld: Abronhill, Kildrum and The Village, returning three members. A 2017 boundary change led to the name being altered to a more general geographic description due to the town centre commercial area and the Seafar neighbourhood (excepting the McGregor Road area) being added, the electorate increasing sufficiently to return an additional councillor. In 2019, the ward had a population of 16,570.

== Councillors ==
Election	Councillors			
2007	Elizabeth Irvine (SNP)	Stevie Grant (Labour)	Tom Johnston (SNP)	3 seats
2012	Elizabeth Irvine (SNP)	Stevie Grant (Labour)	Tom Johnston (SNP)	3 seats
2017	Claire Barclay (SNP)	Gillian Fannan (Labour)	Tom Johnston (SNP)	Partick Hogg (SNP)
2022	Claire Barclay (SNP)	Barry McCulloch (Labour)	Tom Johnston (SNP)	Adam Smith (SNP)

== Election results ==
=== 2017 Election ===
Cumbernauld East- 4 seats
Party	Candidate	FPv%	Count							
Party	Candidate	FPv%	1	2	3	4	5	6	7	8
SNP	Tom Johnston	22.68	1,345							
SNP	Claire Barclay	22.12	1,312							
SNP	Paddy Hogg	13.89	824	955	1,058	1,075	1,147	1,165	1,182	1,257
Labour	Gillian Fannan	13.3	789	793	799	807	832	1,310		
Conservative	David Stark	13.25	786	789	789	793	825	868	896	
Labour	Stevie Grant (incumbent) l	10.52	624	631	636	644	673			
Green	Anne McCrossan	3.0	178	183	186	209				
Scottish Socialist	Andy Locke	1.23	73	75	75					
Electorate: 12,888 Valid: 5,931 Spoilt: 165 Quota: 1,187 Turnout: 6,096 (47.3%)

- On 19 June 2018, SNP Councillor Paddy Hogg of resigned from the party, describing the SNP group as 'toxic'; he thereafter sat as an Independent.

=== 2012 Election ===
Abronhill, Kildrum and the Village - 3 seats
Party	Candidate	FPv%	Count
Party	Candidate	FPv%	1
Labour	Stevie Grant (incumbent)	32.2%	1,449
SNP	Elizabeth Irvine (incumbent)	31.1%	1,399
SNP	Tom Johnston (incumbent)	26%	1,168
Cumbernauld Independent Councillors Alliance	Adam Smith	5.4%	241
Conservative	Ruth Hogg	3.3%	150
Scottish Socialist	Andy Locke	2%	91
Electorate: 11,251 Valid: 4,498 Spoilt: 88 Quota: 1,125 Turnout: 4,586 (40.76%)

=== 2007 Election ===
Abronhill, Kildrum & The Village
Party	Candidate	FPv%	%	Seat	Count
Labour	Stevie Grant	1,939	31.4	1	1
SNP	Elizabeth Irvine	1,753	28.4	1	1
SNP	Tom Johnston (incumbent)	1,430	23.1	1	3
Independent	Anne MacDonald	331	5.4		
Liberal Democrats	Carol Boyle	292	4.7		
Scottish Socialist	Barbara Harvey	165	2.7		
Conservative	Robert Paterson	160	2.6		
Independent	Robert Kelso	109	1.8		
