= Tom Curley (footballer) =

Scottish footballer

Personal information
- Full name: Thomas Curley
- Date of birth: 11 June 1945 (age 81)
- Place of birth: Glasgow, Scotland
- Position: Outside right

Youth career
- 1960: Portsmouth
- 1960–1964: Celtic

Senior career*
Years	Team	Apps	(Gls)
1964–1965	Celtic	1	(0)
1965–1967	Brentford	40	(6)
1967–1969	Crewe Alexandra	52	(7)
1969	Hamilton Academical	4	(0)
- * Club domestic league appearances and goals

Thomas Curley (born 11 June 1945) is a Scottish retired professional footballer who played as an outside right. As a footballer, he made over 90 appearances in the Football League for Crewe Alexandra and Brentford and as a politician he was a member of the Scottish Labour Party for 30 years, before spending his final year in office (2016 to 2017) as an independent councillor outside the party.

== Football club career ==
=== Celtic ===
An outside right, Curley began his career in the youth system at Portsmouth in 1960, but suffered with homesickness and transferred to Celtic in his home city after just a few months. He had to wait until September 1964 to make his senior debut, which came in a 4–2 defeat to Heart of Midlothian on 26 September 1964. It proved to be Curley's only appearance for the Bhoys and he departed Celtic Park in September 1965.

=== Brentford ===
Curley moved to England to sign for Third Division strugglers Brentford on a one-month trial in September 1965. He made his debut in a 1–0 defeat to Gillingham on 30 October 1965 and impressed enough during his trial to win a contract. He failed to make a breakthrough into the first team during the 1965–66 season and made just 14 appearances as the Bees suffered relegation to the Fourth Division. He improved his appearance tally in the basement and made 27 appearances during the 1966–67 season. The stricken club's dire financial situation saw Curley released in 1967 as a result of cost-cutting measures. He made 41 appearances and scored 6 goals during his two seasons with Brentford.

=== Crewe Alexandra ===
Curley moved to Fourth Division club Crewe Alexandra in August 1967. Though he made just 19 appearances, he was part of the team which secured automatic promotion to the Third Division at the end of the 1967–68 season. He broke into the team on a regular basis in the following season and made 33 appearances and scored seven goals, as Alex pushed for a second successive promotion. Curley left Gresty Road in August 1969 and made 52 league appearances and scored seven goals in his two seasons with Alex.

=== Hamilton Academical ===
Curley moved back to Scotland to sign for Second Division club Hamilton Academical on 16 August 1969. He made just five appearances before being released.

== Football chairman career ==
Curley had a spell as chairman of Central Scottish Amateur League Premier Division club Bankhall Villa. The club won the 1992–93 Scottish Amateur Cup under his chairmanship.

== Political career ==
Curley was a member of the Scottish Labour Party for 30 years and until 2017, was a councillor, latterly for the Airdrie South ward. He held positions of Junior Whip, Deputy Provost and Provost. He was provost of North Lanarkshire until May 2012. He resigned from the Scottish Labour Party in October 2016 and became an independent councillor, not standing for re-election in the 2017 North Lanarkshire Council election.

== Career statistics ==
Appearances and goals by club, season and competition
Club	Season	League			National Cup		League Cup		Total	
Club	Season	Division	Apps	Goals	Apps	Goals	Apps	Goals	Apps	Goals
Celtic	1964–65	Scottish First Division	1	0	0	0	0	0	1	0
Brentford	1965–66	Third Division	14	2	0	0	—		14	2
Brentford	1966–67	Fourth Division	26	4	1	0	0	0	27	4
Brentford	Total		40	6	1	0	0	0	41	6
Hamilton Academical	1969–70	Scottish Second Division	4	0	0	0	1	0	5	0
Career total			45	6	1	0	1	0	47	6
