= Airdrie South (ward) =

Electoral ward in North Lanarkshire, Scotland

Location of the ward

Airdrie South is one of the twenty-one wards used to elect members of the North Lanarkshire Council. It elects four councillors, with its territory unaffected by a national boundary review in 2017 – as its name suggests, this covers southern parts of Airdrie (including Brownsburn, Craigneuk, Moffat Mills, Petersburn and South Cairnhill neighbourhoods) plus the outlying settlements of Calderbank and Chapelhall, covering a population of 19,934 in 2019.

== Councillors ==
| Election | Councillors | | | |
|---|---|---|---|---|
| 2007 | David Fagan (Labour) | Tom Curley (Labour) | Michael Coyle (SNP) | John Love (Liberal Democrats) |
| 2012 | David Fagan (Labour) | Tom Curley (Labour) | Michael Coyle (SNP) | Agnes Coyle (SNP) |
| 2017 | Ian McNeil (Labour) | Sandy Watson (Conservative) | Michael Coyle (SNP) | Paul Di Mascio (SNP) |
| 2022 | Michael McBride (Labour) | Sandy Watson (Conservative) | Michael Coyle (SNP) | Paul Di Mascio (SNP) |

== Election results ==
=== 2022 Election ===
Airdrie South - 4 seats
| Party | Candidate | FPv% | Count | | | | |
| Party | Candidate | FPv% | 1 | 2 | 3 | 4 | 5 |
|---|---|---|---|---|---|---|---|
| SNP | Michael Joseph Coyle (incumbent) | 30.7 | 1,847 | | | | |
| Labour | Michael McBride | 23.0 | 1,386 | | | | |
| Conservative | Sandy Watson (incumbent) | 17.1 | 1,028 | 1,038 | 1,055 | 1,061 | 1,592 |
| SNP | Paul Di Mascio (incumbent) | 16.9 | 1,015 | 1,581 | | | |
| Labour | Ian McNeil (incumbent) | 12.3 | 739 | 756 | 891 | 1,054 | |
Electorate: 15,018 Valid: 6,015 Spoilt: 193 Quota: 1,204 Turnout: 6,208 (41.3%)

=== 2017 Election ===
Airdrie South - 4 seats
| Party | Candidate | FPv% | Count | | | | | | | |
| Party | Candidate | FPv% | 1 | 2 | 3 | 4 | 5 | 6 | 7 | 8 |
|---|---|---|---|---|---|---|---|---|---|---|
| SNP | Michael Coyle (incumbent) | 23.67% | 1,468 | | | | | | | |
| Conservative | Sandy Watson | 22.51% | 1,396 | | | | | | | |
| SNP | Paul Di Mascio | 14.62% | 907 | 1,062 | 1,066 | 1,144 | 1,190 | 1,355 | | |
| Labour | Jed Graham | 13.64% | 846 | 851 | 866 | 895 | 940 | 968 | 997 | |
| Labour | Ian McNeil | 13.51% | 838 | 842 | 880 | 915 | 999 | 1,021 | 1,035 | 1,851 |
| Independent | Agnes Coyle (incumbent) | 4.43% | 275 | 316 | 321 | 336 | 365 | | | |
| Independent | Peter Owens | 3.82% | 237 | 239 | 269 | 328 | | | | |
| Green | Rosemary McGowan | 3.8% | 236 | 244 | 252 | | | | | |
Electorate: 14,227 Valid: 6,203 Spoilt: 148 Quota: 1,241 Turnout: 6,351 (43.6%)

=== 2012 Election ===
Airdrie South - 4 seats
| Party | Candidate | FPv% | Count | | | | | | | |
| Party | Candidate | FPv% | 1 | 2 | 3 | 4 | 5 | 6 | 7 | 8 |
|---|---|---|---|---|---|---|---|---|---|---|
| Labour | Tom Curley (incumbent) | 27.3% | 1,488 | | | | | | | |
| SNP | Michael Coyle (incumbent) | 21.2% | 1,155 | | | | | | | |
| Labour | David Fagan (incumbent) | 17.6% | 959 | 1,290.9 | | | | | | |
| SNP | Agnes Coyle | 14.2% | 771 | 784.4 | 804.7 | 853.7 | 877.6 | 910.9 | 945.3 | 1,351.7 |
| SNP | Nancy Pettigrew | 7.5% | 407 | 411.8 | 418.9 | 425.7 | 446.9 | 490.3 | 540.5 | |
| Conservative | Eric Young | 4.7% | 254 | 257.2 | 262.5 | 262.9 | 267.1 | 384.2 | | |
| Liberal Democrats | John Love (incumbent) | 4.1% | 224 | 229.9 | 248.4 | 250.8 | 296.2 | | | |
| Independent | John McGeechan | 3.5% | 188 | 194.9 | 214.9 | 216.3 | | | | |
Electorate: 14,560 Valid: 5,446 Spoilt: 116 Quota: 1,090 Turnout: 5,562 (38.2%)

- Labour councillor David Fagan was suspended from the party on 4 October 2016 over allegations of possession of child pornography.
- Labour councillor Tom Curley resigned from the party on 29 October 2016 and announced he would stand as an Independent in 2017.

=== 2007 Election ===
North Lanarkshire council election, 2007: Airdrie South
| Party | Candidate | FPv% | % | Seat | Count |
|---|---|---|---|---|---|
| SNP | Michael Coyle | 2,845 | 40.0 | 1 | 1 |
| Labour | Tom Curley | 1,706 | 23.7 | 1 | 1 |
| Labour | David Fagan | 712 | 10.0 | 1 | 5 |
| Conservative | Rhona Thornton | 625 | 8.0 | | |
| Labour | Morag Thomson | 570 | 7.2 | | |
| Liberal Democrats | John Love | 566 | 7.1 | 1 | 7 |
| Scottish Socialist | Fraser Coats | 173 | 2.4 | | |
