= Airdrie Central =

Electoral ward for North Lanarkshire Council in Scotland

Location of the ward

Airdrie Central is one of the twenty-one wards used to elect members of the North Lanarkshire Council. It currently elects four councillors and, as its name suggests, covers central and western parts of Airdrie (including Cairnhill, Coatdyke, Gartlea, Rawyards and Whinhall neighbourhoods). Established in 2007 returning three councillors, a boundary review in 2017 resulted in a very minor change (the addition of a few streets in Burnfoot) and slight population increase, but this was assessed to be sufficient for a fourth seat. The ward had a population of 16,354 in 2019.

== Councillors ==
Election	Councillors			
2007	David Stocks (SNP)	Jim Logue (Labour)	George Devine (Ind.)	3 seats
2012	David Stocks (SNP)	Jim Logue (Labour)	Peter Sullivan (Labour)	3 seats
2017	David Stocks (SNP)	Jim Logue (Labour)	Nancy Pettigrew (SNP)	Trevor Douglas (Conservative)
2022	Lesley Jarvie (SNP)	Jim Logue (Labour)	Janice Catherine Toner (SNP)	Chris Costello (Labour)

== Election results ==
=== 2022 Election ===
Airdrie Central - 4 seats
Party	Candidate	FPv%	Count	
Party	Candidate	FPv%	1	2
SNP	Lesley Jarvie	31.4	1,468	
Labour	Chris Costello	21.1	988	
Labour	Jim Logue (incumbent)	21.1	986	
Conservative	Trevor Douglas (incumbent)	13.7	642	646
SNP	Janice Catherine Toner	10.2	478	951
Alba	Julie Marshall	2.5	117	133
Electorate: 12,690 Valid: 4,679 Spoilt: 129 Quota: 936 Turnout: 4,808 (37.9%)

=== 2017 Election ===
Airdrie Central - 4 seats
Party	Candidate	FPv%	Count							
Party	Candidate	FPv%	1	2	3	4	5	6	7	8
Labour	Jim Logue (incumbent)	27.34	1,336							
SNP	Nancy Pettigrew	17.88	874	890	924	958	1,000			
SNP	David Stocks (incumbent)	17.27	844	861	873	895	974	992		
Conservative	Trevor Douglas	15.61	763	781	787	819	878	878	879	1,042
Independent Alliance North Lanarkshire	Peter Sullivan (incumbent)	7.88	385	398	423	489				
Labour	Michael McBride	6.98	341	570	585	612	740	740	744	
Independent	George Devine	4.56	223	233	244					
Green	Claire Williams	2.48	121	124						
Electorate: 12,756 Valid: 4,887 Spoilt: 126 Quota: 978 Turnout: 5,013 (39.3%)

=== 2012 Election ===
Airdrie Central - 3 seats
Party	Candidate	FPv%	Count				
Party	Candidate	FPv%	1	2	3	4	5
Labour	Jim Logue (incumbent)	31.7%	1,351				
SNP	David Stocks (incumbent)	22.2%	945	959.7	983.9	1,058.3	1,759.9
SNP	Graham Russell	16.9%	721	737.6	754.8	832.5	
Labour	Peter Sullivan	14.8%	630	825.9	857.9	995.3	1,042.9
Independent	George Devine (incumbent)	9.8%	419	436	497.4		
Conservative	Christine Young	4.6%	198	201.8			
Electorate: 11,965 Valid: 4,264 Spoilt: 96 Quota: 1,067 Turnout: 4,360 (36.44%)

=== 2007 Election ===
North Lanarkshire council election, 2007: Airdrie Central
Party	Candidate	FPv%	%	Seat	Count
SNP	David Stocks	1,924	35.6	1	1
Labour	Jim Logue	1,256	23.4	1	4
Labour	Peter Sullivan	829	15.3		
Independent	George Devine	630	11.7	1	7
Independent	Ian McNeil	351	6.5		
Conservative	Cynthia MacKenzie	318	5.9		
Scottish Socialist	Audrey McMath	95	1.8		
