= 2017 North Lanarkshire Council election =

2017 Scottish local government election

- 4 May 2017

All 77 seats to North Lanarkshire Council 39 seats needed for a majority
	First party	Second party	Third party
Leader	David Stocks	Jim Logue	Meghan Gallacher
Party	SNP	Labour	Conservative
Leader's seat	Airdrie Central	Airdrie Central	Motherwell West
Last election	26 seats, 37.1%	41 seats, 58.6%	0 seats, 0%
Seats before	30	44	0
Seats won	33	32	10
Seat change	▲3	▼12	▲10
	Fourth party
Leader	Robert McKendrick
Party	Independent
Leader's seat	Murdostoun
Last election	2 seats, 3%
Seats before	2
Seats won	2
Seat change	0
Council Leader before election
Jim Logue
Labour
Council Leader after election
Jim Logue
Labour

2017 Elections to North Lanarkshire Council were held on 4 May 2017, on the same day as the 31 other local authorities in Scotland. The election utilised twenty-one wards with 77 Councillors being elected. This represented an increase of 7 seats and 1 additional ward when compared to 2012. Each ward elected either 3 or 4 members, using the STV electoral system.

The election saw the Scottish National Party overtake Labour as the largest party on the council. Despite the SNP winning the most seats and most votes, North Lanarkshire was run by a Labour administration supported by the Scottish Conservatives. Labour leader Jim Logue was appointed Leader of the Council with the support of Conservative and Independent councillors.

== Election result ==
2017 North Lanarkshire Council election result
Party	Seats	Gains	Losses	Net gain/loss	Seats %	Votes %	Votes	+/−
SNP	33	4	1	+3	42.86	38.46	42,051	+3.86
Labour	32	1	13	-12	41.56	32.99	36,063	-17.81
Conservative	10	10	0	+10	12.99	15.86	17,338	+10.36
Independent	2	1	1	0	2.60	7.48	8,178	+1.38
Independent Alliance North Lanarkshire	0	-	-	-	-	2.58	2,823	New
Green	0	-	-	-	-	1.32	1,444	New
BUP	0	-	-	-	-	0.51	559	New
UKIP	0	-	-	-	-	0.39	428	New
RISE	0	-	-	-	-	0.17	186	New
Scottish Socialist	0	-	-	-	-	0.15	167	-0.25
Solidarity	0	-	-	-	-	0.09	94	New

Note: "Votes" are the first preference votes. The net gain/loss and percentage changes relate to the result of the previous Scottish local elections on 3 May 2012. This may differ from other published sources showing gain/loss relative to seats held at dissolution of Scotland's councils.

== Ward results ==
=== Kilsyth ===
- 2012: 2xLab; 1xSNP
- 2017: 2xLab; 1xSNP
- 2012-2017: No change

Kilsyth - 3 seats
Party	Candidate	FPv%	Count						
Party	Candidate	FPv%	1	2	3	4	5	6	7
Labour	Jean Jones (incumbent)	33.70	1,496						
SNP	Alan Stevenson (incumbent)	17.57	780	740	756	783	785	811	
SNP	Mark Kerr	17.19	763	781	806	847	848	892	1,593
Labour	Heather McVey (incumbent)	16.47	731	1,097	1,104	1,126			
Conservative	Paul Anderson	11.33	503	515	516	524	527		
Green	Rob Kay	2.18	97	102	118				
Solidarity	Kevin Kane	1.55	69	74					
Electorate: 9,657 Valid: 4,439 Spoilt: 119 Quota: 1,110 Turnout: 4,558 (47.2%)

=== Cumbernauld North ===
- 2012: 2xLab; 1xCICA; 1xSNP;
- 2017: 2xSNP; 1xLab; 1xCon
- 2012-2017 Change: SNP gain 1 seat from CICA; Con gain 1 seat from Lab

Cumbernauld North - 4 seats
Party	Candidate	FPv%	Count									
Party	Candidate	FPv%	1	2	3	4	5	6	7	8	9	10
SNP	Alan Masterton (incumbent)	25.54	1,833									
Conservative	Calum Currie	16.53	1,186	1,189	1,192	1,205	1,216	1,217	1,300	1,334	1,362	1,716
SNP	Danish Ashraf	14.03	1,007	1,331	1,336	1,338	1,444					
Labour	Tom Fisher	11.93	856	864	865	870	899	900	968	1,585		
Labour	Barry McCulloch (incumbent)	10.05	721	730	735	740	759	759	808			
Independent	Alan O'Brien (incumbent)	9.91	711	722	723	733	769	770	1,009	1,051	1,075	
Independent	Fraser Morrison	7.09	509	517	518	521	573	574				
Green	Kevin Hamilton	3.91	281	297	303	305						
UKIP	Carl Pearson	0.63	45	45	45							
Scottish Socialist	John Miller	0.37	27	28								
Electorate: 14,497 Valid: 7,176 Spoilt: 145 Quota: 1,436 Turnout: 7,321 (50.5%)

=== Cumbernauld South ===
- 2012: 2xLab; 2xSNP
- 2017: 3xSNP; 1xLab
- 2012-2017 Change: SNP gain one seat from Lab

Cumbernauld South - 4 seats
Party	Candidate	FPv%	Count							
Party	Candidate	FPv%	1	2	3	4	5	6	7	8
SNP	William Goldie (incumbent)	19.36	1,146	1,151	1,178	1,233				
SNP	Catherine Johnston	17.40	1,030	1,033	1,075	1,093	1,122	1,149	1,181	1,224
Labour	Allan Graham (incumbent)	16.29	964	970	981	1,018	1,020	1,648		
SNP	Junaid Ashraf	14.12	836	840	880	907	920	943	972	1,026
Conservative	Colin Gibson	12.47	738	740	749	794	795	824	912	
Labour	Stephanie Griffin née Muir (incumbent)	12.28	727	742	763	790	791			
Independent	William Homer	3.78	224	227	262					
Green	Patrick McAleer	3.16	187	210						
Scottish Socialist	Kevin McVey	1.13	67							
Electorate: 12,752 Valid: 5,919 Spoilt: 189 Quota: 1,184 Turnout: 6,108 (47.9%)

=== Cumbernauld East ===
- 2017: 3xSNP; 1xLab
- 2012-2017 Change: New ward

Cumbernauld East - 4 seats
Party	Candidate	FPv%	Count							
Party	Candidate	FPv%	1	2	3	4	5	6	7	8
SNP	Tom Johnston*	22.68	1,345							
SNP	Claire Barclay	22.12	1,312							
SNP	††††Paddy Hogg +	13.89	824	955	1,058	1,075	1,147	1,165	1,182	1,257
Labour	Gillian Fannan	13.30	789	793	799	807	832	1,310		
Conservative	David Stark	13.25	786	789	789	793	825	868	896	
Labour	Stevie Grant *	10.52	624	631	636	644	673			
Green	Anne McCrossan	3.00	178	183	186	209				
Scottish Socialist	Andy Locke	1.23	73	75	75					
Electorate: 12,888 Valid: 5,931 Spoilt: 165 Quota: 1,187 Turnout: 6,096 (47.3%)

- = Sitting Councillors for Abronhill, Kildrum and the Village Ward.

+ = Sitting Councillor for Cumbernauld South Ward.

=== Stepps, Chryston and Muirhead ===
- 2017: 1xSNP; 1xLab; 1xCon
- 2012-2017 Change: New ward

Stepps, Chryston and Muirhead - 3 seats
Party	Candidate	FPv%	Count				
Party	Candidate	FPv%	1	2	3	4	5
SNP	Lynne Anderson	28.34	1,292				
Conservative	Stephen Goldsack†††	21.65	987	989	998	1,084	1,126
Labour	John McLaren (incumbent) *	19.26	878	885	935	1,101	1,876
Labour	Scott Lamond	16.65	759	765	817	913	
Independent	Frances McGlinchey (incumbent) *	9.12	416	421	552		
SNP	Stephen Kirley	4.98	227	352			
Electorate: 9,309 Valid: 4,559 Spoilt: 114 Quota: 1,140 Turnout: 4673 (50.2%)

- = Sitting Councillors for Strathkelvin Ward.

=== Gartcosh, Glenboig and Moodiesburn ===
- 2017: 2xLab; 1xSNP
- 2012-2017 Change: New ward

Gartcosh, Glenboig and Moodiesburn - 3 seats
Party	Candidate	FPv%	Count						
Party	Candidate	FPv%	1	2	3	4	5	6	7
Labour	Willie Doolan	28.60	1,241						
SNP	Greg Lennon	28.46	1,235						
Labour	Michael McPake (incumbent) *	14.47	628	751	759	782	858	1,070	1,370
Conservative	David MacLean	13.53	587	592	592	626	692	722	
Independent	John Wilson	6.41	278	283	286	301			
SNP	Gerry Parker	6.31	274	279	410	420	480		
UKIP	Sean Cairns	2.21	96	97	99				
Electorate: 9,536 Valid: 4,339 Spoilt: 105 Quota: 1,085 Turnout: 4,444 (46.6%)

- = Sitting Councillor for Coatbridge North and Glenboig Ward.

=== Coatbridge North ===
- 2017: 2xSNP; 2xLab
- 2007-2012 Change: New ward

Coatbridge North - 4 seats
Party	Candidate	FPv%	Count						
Party	Candidate	FPv%	1	2	3	4	5	6	7
SNP	Kirsten Larson	22.56	1,100						
Labour	Alex McVey *	21.06	1,027						
Conservative	Ben Callaghan	14.83	723	724	726	728	749	806	
Labour	Bill Shields *	13.53	660	665	704	721	786	913	1,228
SNP	Allan Stubbs	12.22	596	693	694	741	788	945	975
Independent	Julie McAnulty *	8.67	423	428	430	460	512		
Independent	Martin McWilliams	4.90	239	241	243	249			
Green	Graham Kerr	2.24	109	115	116				
Electorate: 12,055 Valid: 4,877 Spoilt: 162 Quota: 976 Turnout: 5,039 (41.8%)

- = Sitting Councillors for Coatbridge North and Glenboig Ward.

=== Airdrie North ===
- 2012: 2xSNP; 2xLab
- 2017: 1xSNP; 1xLab; 1xInd; 1xCon
- 2012-2017 Change: Ind gain one seat from SNP; Con gain one seat from Lab

Airdrie North - 4 seats
Party	Candidate	FPv%	Count							
Party	Candidate	FPv%	1	2	3	4	5	6	7	8
SNP	Sophia Coyle (incumbent)	22.11	1,320							
Labour	Tommy Morgan (incumbent)	19.17	1,144	1,151	1,155	1,170	1,238			
Independent	Alan Beveridge (incumbent)	18.25	1,084	1,090	1,101	1,121	1,276			
Conservative	David Cullen	18.25	1,084	1,086	1,105	1,117	1,133	1,156	1,159	1,446
Labour	Andrew Spowart (incumbent)	13.44	798	802	807	815	860	886	918	
SNP	Andy Pettigrew	5.99	356	453	464	501				
Green	Kyle Davidson	1.52	90	97	100					
UKIP	Daryl Gardner	1.06	63	64						
Electorate: 14,789 Valid: 5,939 Spoilt: 154 Quota: 1,188 Turnout: 6,093 (41.2%)

=== Airdrie Central ===
- 2012: 2xLab; 1xSNP
- 2017: 2xSNP; 1xLab; 1xCon
- 2012-2017 Change: 1 extra seat compared to 2012. Con gain one seat from Lab

Airdrie Central - 4 seats
Party	Candidate	FPv%	Count							
Party	Candidate	FPv%	1	2	3	4	5	6	7	8
Labour	Jim Logue (incumbent)	27.34	1,336							
SNP	Nancy Pettigrew	17.88	874	890	924	958	1,000			
SNP	David Stocks (incumbent)	17.27	844	861	873	895	974	992		
Conservative	Trevor Douglas	15.61	763	781	787	819	878	878	879	1,042
Independent Alliance North Lanarkshire	Peter Sullivan (incumbent)	7.88	385	398	423	489				
Labour	Michael McBride	6.98	341	570	585	612	740	740	744	
Independent	George Devine	4.56	223	233	244					
Green	Claire Williams	2.48	121	124						
Electorate: 12,756 Valid: 4,887 Spoilt: 126 Quota: 978 Turnout: 5,013 (39.3%)

=== Coatbridge West ===
- 2012: 2xLab; 1xSNP
- 2017: 2xLab; 1xSNP
- 2012-2017 Change: No change

Coatbridge West - 3 seats
Party	Candidate	FPv%	Count				
Party	Candidate	FPv%	1	2	3	4	5
Labour	Kevin Docherty (incumbent)	36.52	1,378				
SNP	Caroline Stephen	34.80	1,313				
SNP	Paul Welsh (incumbent)	10.15	383	403	722	745	
Labour	Mary Gourlay	9.44	356	702	718	878	1,196
Conservative	Francis McIntyre	9.09	343	352	356		
Electorate: 10,107 Valid: 3,773 Spoilt: 209 Quota: 944 Turnout: 3,982 (39.4%)

=== Coatbridge South ===
- 2012: 2xLab; 1xSNP
- 2017: 2xLab; 2xSNP
- 2012-2017 Change: 1 extra seat compared to 2012

Coatbridge South - 4 seats
Party	Candidate	FPv%	Count							
Party	Candidate	FPv%	1	2	3	4	5	6	7	8
SNP	Tracy Carragher	29.95	1,392							
Labour	Tom Castles	22.72	1,056							
SNP	Fergus MacGregor	12.76	593	966						
Conservative	John Cameron	11.88	552	557	560	560	567	588	653	
Labour	Gordon Encinias††††††	6.80	316	338	442	447	479	517	693	932
Independent Alliance North Lanarkshire	Jim Brooks (incumbent)	6.69	311	322	324	327	425	517		
Independent	Gerry Somers	4.65	216	225	227	233	275			
Independent Alliance North Lanarkshire	John Higgins (incumbent)	4.54	211	223	226	230				
Electorate: 12,726 Valid: 4,647 Spoilt: 189 Quota: 930 Turnout: 4,836 (38.0%)

=== Airdrie South ===
- 2012: 2xLab; 2xSNP
- 2017: 2xSNP; 1xLab; 1xCon
- 2012-2017 Change: Con gain one seat from Lab

Airdrie South - 4 seats
Party	Candidate	FPv%	Count							
Party	Candidate	FPv%	1	2	3	4	5	6	7	8
SNP	Michael Coyle (incumbent)	23.67%	1,468							
Conservative	Sandy Watson	22.51%	1,396							
SNP	Paul Di Mascio	14.62%	907	1,062	1,066	1,144	1,190	1,355		
Labour	Jed Graham	13.64%	846	851	866	895	940	968	997	
Labour	Ian McNeil	13.51%	838	842	880	915	999	1,021	1,035	1,851
Independent	Agnes Coyle (incumbent)	4.43%	275	316	321	336	365			
Independent	Peter Owens	3.82%	237	239	269	328				
Green	Rosemary McGowan	3.80%	236	244	252					
Electorate: 14,227 Valid: 6,203 Spoilt: 148 Quota: 1,241 Turnout: 6,351 (43.6%)

=== Fortissat ===
- 2012: 1xLab; 1xIndependent; 1xSNP
- 2017: 2xLab; 1xSNP; 1xCon
- 2012-2017 Change: 1 extra seat compared to 2012

Fortissat - 4 seats
Party	Candidate	FPv%	Count					
Party	Candidate	FPv%	1	2	3	4	5	6
Labour	Martin McCulloch	29.29	1,477					
SNP	Thomas Cochrane†† (incumbent)	20.15	1,016					
Conservative	Sandy Thornton†	13.29	670	678	678	691	948	1,121
BUP	Jeffrey McDonald	11.08	559	574	574	591		
Independent	Charlie Cefferty (incumbent)	10.09	509	527	527	661	754	
SNP	Mags Murphy	8.90	449	469	475			
Labour	Kenneth Stevenson	7.20	363	715	715	806	891	1,117
Electorate: 12,051 Valid: 5,043 Spoilt: 139 Quota: 1,009 Turnout: 5,182 (43.0%)

=== Thorniewood ===
- 2012: 2xLab; 1xSNP
- 2017: 2xLab; 1xSNP
- 2012-2017 Change: No change

Thorniewood - 3 seats
Party	Candidate	FPv%	Count			
Party	Candidate	FPv%	1	2	3	4
Labour	Bob Burrows (incumbent)	33.48	1,568			
SNP	Steven Bonnar (incumbent)††††††††	31.17	1,460			
Labour	Hugh Gaffney†††††††	16.78	786	1,119	1,156	1,419
Conservative	Christine McConnell	11.08	519	536	540	
SNP	Josh Robertson	7.49	351	362	584	609
Electorate: 10,688 Valid: 4,684 Spoilt: 104 Quota: 1,172 Turnout: 4,788 (44.8%)

=== Bellshill ===
- 2012: 2xLab; 1xSNP
- 2017: 2xLab; 1xSNP; 1xCon
- 2012-2017 Change: 1 extra seat compared to 2012.

Bellshill - 4 seats
Party	Candidate	FPv%	Count					
Party	Candidate	FPv%	1	2	3	4	5	6
Labour	Harry Curran (incumbent)	25.15	1,237					
SNP	Jordan Linden	21.53	1,059					
Conservative	Colin Cameron	17.69	870	877	877	915	971	1,016
SNP	Marina Lyle (incumbent)	15.09	742	756	823	826	881	
Labour	Angela Campbell	12.36	608	798	800	821	927	1,172
Independent	John Devlin	6.36	313	327	329	343		
UKIP	William Brown	1.81	89	91	92			
Electorate: 12,229 Valid: 4,918 Spoilt: 145 Quota: 984 Turnout: 5,063 (41.4%)

=== Mossend and Holytown ===
- 2012: 2xLab; 1xSNP
- 2017: 2xLab; 1xSNP
- 2012-2017 Change: No change

Mossend and Holytown - 3 seats
Party	Candidate	FPv%	Count				
Party	Candidate	FPv%	1	2	3	4	5
Labour	Frank McNally (incumbent)	30.41	1,131				
SNP	David Baird††††† (incumbent)	28.56	1,062				
Conservative	Carol Cunningham	17.19	641	649	651	701	
SNP	Michael Clarkson	12.26	456	465	586		
Labour	Jim Reddin	11.54	429	597	599	810	1,179
Electorate: 9,665 Valid: 3,719 Spoilt: 147 Quota: 930 Turnout: 3,866 (40.0%)

=== Motherwell West ===
- 2012: 2xLab; 1xSNP
- 2017: 1xSNP; 1xLab; 1xCon
- 2012-2017 Change: Con gain one seat from Lab

Motherwell West - 3 seats
Party	Candidate	FPv%	Count						
Party	Candidate	FPv%	1	2	3	4	5	6	7
Conservative	Meghan Gallacher	21.99	1,002	1,019	1,047	1,097	1,163		
SNP	Annette Valentine (incumbent)	21.15	964	970	1,009	1,047	1,080	1,081	1,854
Labour	Paul Kelly (incumbent)	20.12	917	923	958	1,453			
SNP	Jamie Super	16.74	763	773	808	834	867	869	
Labour	Michael Ross (incumbent)	14.00	638	652	673				
RISE	Julie Fleming	4.08	186	207					
Independent Alliance North Lanarkshire	Elaine McSpadden	1.91	87						
Electorate: 10,585 Valid: 4,557 Spoilt: 111 Quota: 1,140 Turnout: 4,668 (44.1%)

=== Motherwell North ===
- 2012: 3xLab; 1xSNP
- 2017: 2xLab; 2xSNP
- 2012-2017 Change: SNP gain one seat from Lab

Motherwell North - 4 seats
Party	Candidate	FPv%	Count					
Party	Candidate	FPv%	1	2	3	4	5	6
SNP	Shahid Farooq (incumbent)	19.83	1,123	1,173				
SNP	Ann Weir	19.37	1,097	1,164				
Labour	Pat O'Rourke (incumbent)	18.38	1,041	1,182				
Labour	Olivia Carson	16.46	932	1,018	1,057	1,072	1,084	1,582
Conservative	Ashley Baird	16.03	908	988	989	992	994	
Independent Alliance North Lanarkshire	Helen McKenna (incumbent)	9.92	562					
Electorate: 13,646 Valid: 5,663 Spoilt: 164 Quota: 1,133 Turnout: 5,827 (42.7%)

=== Motherwell South East and Ravenscraig ===
- 2012: 3xLab; 1xSNP
- 2017: 2xSNP; 1xLab; 1xCon
- 2012-2017 Change: SNP gain one seat from Lab; Con gain one seat from Lab

Motherwell South East and Ravenscraig - 4 seats
Party	Candidate	FPv%	Count											
Party	Candidate	FPv%	1	2	3	4	5	6	7	8	9	10	11	12
SNP	Agnes Magowan	25.27	1,507											
Conservative	Nathan Wilson	19.92	1,188	1,192	1,193	1,193	1,194	1,218						
SNP	Alan Valentine (incumbent)	16.16	964	1,224										
Labour	Kenneth Duffy	14.40	859	866	868	870	874	877	879	892	923	958	1,039	1,591
Labour	Kaye Harmon (incumbent)	9.81	565	573	575	576	578	582	586	599	622	649	754	
Independent Alliance North Lanarkshire	Gary O'Rorke (incumbent)	5.45	325	331	332	333	336	342	344	365	377	433		
Independent	Ian Glenny	2.78	166	188	190	198	199	201	203	241	273			
Green	Ben Adams	2.43	145	150	157	159	169	175	176	185				
Independent	Ian Kelly	2.20	131	134	135	137	140	147	148					
UKIP	Neil Wilson	1.14	68	68	69	69	69							
Solidarity	James Mitchell	0.42	25	27	28	29								
Independent	Deryck Beaumont	0.35	21	21	22									
Electorate: 14,254 Valid: 5,964 Spoilt: 151 Quota: 1,197 Turnout: 6,115 (42.9%)

=== Murdostoun ===
- 2012: 2xLab; 1xSNP; 1xIndependent
- 2017: 1xIndependent; 1xSNP; 2xLab
- 2012-2017 Change: No change

Murdostoun - 4 seats
Party	Candidate	FPv%	Count							
Party	Candidate	FPv%	1	2	3	4	5	6	7	8
Independent	Robert McKendrick (incumbent)	27.55	1,765							
SNP	Cameron McManus	18.89	1,210	1,267	1,270	1,295				
Conservative	Cindy MacKenzie	12.88	825	851	880	914	915	983	1,006	
Labour	Nicky Shevlin(incumbent)	12.21	782	825	829	841	841	931	1,008	1,145
Labour	Louise Roarty	11.52	738	804	810	827	828	859	1,014	1,235
SNP	Anum Qaisar	8.76	561	602	604	614	624	684		
Independent	John Taggart (incumbent)	4.43	284	366	370	452	452			
Independent	Robert Arthur	2.40	154	231	241					
UKIP	Yvonne Millar	1.04	67	77						
Electorate: 13,928 Valid: 6,406 Spoilt: 162 Quota: 1,282 Turnout: 6,568 (46%)

=== Wishaw ===
- 2012: 2xLab; 2xSNP
- 2017: 2xSNP; 1xLab; 1xCon
- 2012-2017 Change: Conservative gain one seat from Lab

Wishaw - 4 seats
Party	Candidate	FPv%	Count						
Party	Candidate	FPv%	1	2	3	4	5	6	7
SNP	Fiona Fotheringham	25.35	1,442						
Labour	Angela Feeney	18.90	1,075	1,088	1,119	1,418			
Conservative	Bob Burgess	18.76	1,067	1,070	1,079	1,100	1,141		
SNP	Jim Hume (incumbent)	13.62	775	1,041	1,054	1,062	1,099	1,099	1,278
Independent Alliance North Lanarkshire	Sam Love (incumbent)	12.80	728	733	850	891;	946	947	
Labour	James Robertson	6.80	387	389	414				
Independent Alliance North Lanarkshire	Frank McKay (incumbent)	3.76	214	216					
Electorate: 13,902 Valid: 5,688 Spoilt: 165 Quota: 1,138 Turnout: 5,853 (42.1%)

== Changes since 2017 ==
- † Fortissat Conservative candidate, Sandy Thornton refused to sign his acceptance of office, resulting in the seat becoming vacant on 28 June 2017. A by-election took place on 7 September 2017 and was won by Clare Quigley of Scottish Labour.
- †† On 8 May 2018, Councillor Tommy Cochrane resigned from The SNP and became an independent citing lack of support from The SNP in Fortissat. He resigned his seat on 18 March 2020 saying he was increasingly unable to manage personal and work commitments.
- ††† On 22 May 2018 Councillor Stephen Goldsack of the Scottish Conservatives was expelled from the party after previous connections to the British National Party were exposed.
- †††† On 19 June 2018, Councillor Paddy Hogg of Cumbernauld East resigned from The SNP. He described the SNP group as ‘toxic’. He now sits as an independent.
- ††††† On 10 July 2018, Councillor David Baird of Mossend and Holytown was suspended from The SNP for 'breaking procedure'. He now sits as an independent. He re-joined the party in 2018.
- †††††† On 13 August 2018, Coatbridge South Labour Councillor Gordon Encinias died, having been unwell for some time. A by-election was held on 25 October and was held by Geraldine Woods of Scottish Labour.
- ††††††† On 1 Jul 2019, Thorniewood Labour Councillor Hugh Gaffney resigned his seat. He was elected as MP for Coatbridge, Chryston and Bellshill at the 2017 UK Parliament Election. A by-election was held on 19 September 2019 and the seat was retained by Labour.
- †††††††† Thorniewood SNP Cllr Steven Bonnar was elected as MP for Coatbridge, Chryston and Bellshill at the 2019 UK Parliament Election. He resigned his Council seat and the by-election was set for May but was deferred until 19 November 2020.

== By-elections since 2017 ==
=== Fortissat (1) ===
Fortissat By-election (7 September 2017) - 1 Seat
Party	Candidate	FPv%	Count						
Party	Candidate	FPv%	1	2	3	4	5	6	7
Labour	Clare Quigley	38.5	1,420	1,421	1,426	1,466	1,546	1,827	2,117
BUP	John Jo Leckie	23.3	858	865	867	913	1,088	1,139	
SNP	Mags Murphy	20.6	761	762	770	791	804		
Conservative	Norma McNab	11.5	424	427	428	459			
Independent	Charlie Cefferty	5.0	184	184	188				
Green	Kyle Davidson	0.7	24	26					
UKIP	Daryl Gardner	0.5	18						
Electorate: 12,163 Valid: 3,689 Spoilt: 47 Quota: 1,845 Turnout: 3,736 (30.7%)

=== Coatbridge South ===
Coatbridge South By-election (25 October 2018) - 1 Seat
Party	Candidate	FPv%	Count					
Party	Candidate	FPv%	1	2	3	4	5	6
Labour	Geraldine Woods	42.2	1,355	1,360	1,364	1,380	1,549	2,070
SNP	Lesley Mitchell	41.8	1,343	1,344	1,346	1,360	1,405	
Conservative	Ben Callaghan	13.8	492	494	496	499		
Green	Rosemary McGowan	1.5	47	50	51			
UKIP	Neil Wilson	0.4	14	14				
Liberal Democrats	Christopher Wilson	0.4	13					
Electorate: 12,766 Valid: 3,264 Spoilt: 48 Quota: 1,633 Turnout: 3,312 (25.9%)

=== Thorniewood (1) ===
Thorniewood By-election (19 September 2019) - 1 Seat
Party	Candidate	FPv%	Count				
Party	Candidate	FPv%	1	2	3	4	5
Labour	Norah Moody	44.3	1,362	1,370	1,424	1,528	2,043
SNP	Eve Cunnington	39.1	1,202	1,221	1,245	1,271	
Conservative	Lorraine Nolan	9.6	296	298	335		
Liberal Democrats	Colin Robb	5.5	168	176			
Green	Rosemary McGowan	1.5	46				

=== Fortissat (2) ===
Fortissat By-election (4 March 2021) - 1 Seat
Party	Candidate	FPv%	Count			
Party	Candidate	FPv%	1	2	3	4
Labour	Peter Kelly	38.4%	1,071	1,073	1,093	1,408
SNP	Sarah Quinn	34.6%	965	970	994	1,026
Conservative	Ben Callaghan	23.5%	656	664	679	
Green	Kyle Davidson	2.5%	69	74		
UKIP	Neil Wilson	1.1%	31			
Electorate: TBC Valid: 2,792 Spoilt: 29 Quota: 1,397 Turnout: 23.3%

=== Thorniewood (2) ===
Thorniewood By-election (4 March 2021) - 1 Seat
Party	Candidate	FPv%	Count				
Party	Candidate	FPv%	1	2	3	4	5
Labour	Helen Loughran	36.4%	998	999	1,018	1,112	1,263
SNP	Eve Cunnington	34.5%	944	944	960	971	1,160
Independent	Joseph Budd	18.9%	518	520	528	558	
Conservative	Oyebola Ajala	7.7%	212	215	220		
Green	Rosemary McGowan	1.9%	53	57			
UKIP	Daryl Gardner	0.5%	15				
Electorate: TBC Valid: 2,740 Spoilt: 29 Quota: 1,371 Turnout: 25.4%

=== Murdostoun ===
Murdostoun By-election (24 June 2021) - 1 Seat
Party	Candidate	FPv%	Count						
Party	Candidate	FPv%	1	2	3	4	5	6	7
Independent	Robert John McKendrick	41.24%	1,504	1,504	1,507	1,515	1,566	1,681	1,873
SNP	Julia Stachurska	24,24%	884	884	884	906	918	968	1,060
Labour	Chris Roartry	16.92%	617	617	618	632	702	729	
Independent	Robert Arthur	8.03%	293	296	299	303	334		
Conservative	Cindy Mackenzie	7.24%	264	265	265	267			
Green	Nathaniel Hamiltion	1.75%	61	62	62				
ISP	Julie Mcanulty	0.38%	14	14					
Reform	Billy Ross	0.19%	7						
Electorate: 14,488 Valid: 3,644 Spoilt: 43 Quota: 1,823 Turnout: 25.4%
