= Wishaw (ward) =

Electoral ward in North Lanarkshire, Scotland

Location of the ward

Wishaw is one of the twenty-one wards used to elect members of the North Lanarkshire Council. It elects four councillors and covers the town centre of Wishaw plus the neighbourhoods to its south and east including Gowkthrapple, Netherton, Overtown, Pather and Waterloo, with a population of 17,974 in 2019; created in 2007, its territory remained almost unchanged in a 2017 national review, other than the loss of a few streets by moving a section of the boundary south from the Temple Gill burn to the edge of Belhaven Park.

== Councillors ==
Election	Councillors			
2007	Clare Adamson (SNP)	John Pentland (Labour)	Sam Love (Labour)	Frank McKay (Labour)
2012	Marion Fellows (SNP)	Jim Hume (SNP)	Sam Love (Labour)	Frank McKay (Labour)
2015 by-	Rosa Zambonini (SNP)	Jim Hume (SNP)	Sam Love (Labour)	Frank McKay (Labour)
2017	Fiona Fotheringham (SNP)	Jim Hume (SNP)	Angela Feeney (Labour)	Bob Burgess (Conservative)
2022	Fiona Fotheringham (SNP)	Jim Hume (SNP)	Frank McKay (Labour)	Bob Burgess (Conservative)

== Election results ==
=== 2022 Election ===
Wishaw - 4 seats
Party	Candidate	FPv%	Count				
Party	Candidate	FPv%	1	2	3	4	5
SNP	Fiona Fotheringham (incumbent)	31.9	1,687				
Labour	Frank McKay	21.5	1,138				
Conservative	Bob Burgess (incumbent)	18.5	980	988	1,000	1,004	1,383
Labour	Martine Nolan	14.6	771	794	881	946	
SNP	Jim Hume (incumbent)	13.6	719	1,286			
Electorate: 13,431 Valid: 5,295 Spoilt: 186 Quota: 1,060 Turnout: 5,481 (40.8%)

=== 2017 Election ===
2017 North Lanarkshire Council election

Wishaw - 4 seats
Party	Candidate	FPv%	Count						
Party	Candidate	FPv%	1	2	3	4	5	6	7
SNP	Fiona Fotheringham	25.35	1,442						
Labour	Angela Feeney	18.9	1,075	1,088	1,119	1,418			
Conservative	Bob Burgess	18.76	1,067	1,070	1,079	1,100	1,141		
SNP	Jim Hume (incumbent)	13.62	775	1,041	1,054	1,062	1,099	1,099	1,278
Independent Alliance North Lanarkshire	Sam Love (incumbent)	12.8	728	733	850	891;	946	947	
Labour	James Robertson	6.8	387	389	414				
Independent Alliance North Lanarkshire	Frank McKay (incumbent)	3.76	214	216					
Electorate: 13,902 Valid: 5,688 Spoilt: 165 Quota: 1,138 Turnout: 5,853 (42.1%)

=== 2012 Election ===
2012 North Lanarkshire Council election

Wishaw - 4 seats
Party	Candidate	FPv%	Count					
Party	Candidate	FPv%	1	2	3	4	5	6
Labour	Sam Love (incumbent)	30.5%	1,590					
SNP	Marion Fellows††††††	21.5%	1,118					
Labour	Frank McKay (incumbent)	17.9%	932	1,296.9				
SNP	Jim Hume	12.9%	674	701.9	712.2	780.2	888.7	1,020.9
Labour	James Robertson	9.3%	482	558.5	767.8	769.2	837.2	
Conservative	Marjory Borthwick	7.9%	412	428.9	432.7	434.6		
Electorate: 14,299 Valid: 5,208 Spoilt: 124 Quota: 1,042 Turnout: 5,332 (37.29%)

- On 8 March 2016, Labour councillor Sam Love resigned from the party and became Independent.
- Labour councillor Frank McKay resigned from the party and became Independent on 21 November 2016.

==== 2015 by-election ====
SNP councillor Marion Fellows was elected as an MP for Motherwell and Wishaw on 7 May 2015. She resigned her Council seat on 25 May 2015 and a by-election was held 13 August 2015 – the seat was held by the party's Rosa Zambonini.

Wishaw By-election (13 August 2015) - 1 Seat
Party	Candidate	FPv%	Count
Party	Candidate	FPv%	1
SNP	Rosa Zambonini	51.1%	1,915
Labour	Peter McDade	32.8%	1,230
Conservative	Marjory Borthwick	10.3%	385
Scottish Socialist	Maria Feeney	3.1%	117
UKIP	Neil Wilson	1.8%	67
Liberal Democrats	Gerard Neary	1%	37
Electorate: 14,592 Valid: 3,751 Spoilt: 43 Quota: 1,876 Turnout: 3,794 (26.1%)

=== 2007 Election ===
2007 North Lanarkshire Council election

North Lanarkshire council election, 2007: Wishaw
Party	Candidate	FPv%	%	Seat	Count
SNP	Clare Adamson	2,232	30.6	1	1
Labour	John Pentland	1,605	22.0	1	1
Labour	Sam Love	1,594	21.9	1	1
Labour	Frank McKay	1,099	15.1	1	5
Conservative	Marjory Borthwick	761	10.4		
