= Motherwell West (ward) =

Electoral ward in North Lanarkshire, Scotland

Location of the ward

Motherwell West is one of the twenty-one wards used to elect members of the North Lanarkshire Council. It elects three councillors and covers parts of Motherwell lying west of the Argyle Line and Cumbernauld line railways, including the Forgewood, Greenacres, Braedale and North Motherwell neighbourhoods, with a population of 14,256 in 2019; created in 2007, its boundaries remained unchanged in a 2017 national review.

== Councillors ==
Election	Councillors		
2007	Annette Valentine (SNP)	Michael Ross (Labour)	Paul Kelly (Labour)
2012	Annette Valentine (SNP)	Michael Ross (Labour)	Paul Kelly (Labour)
2017	Annette Valentine (SNP)	Meghan Gallacher (Conservative)	Paul Kelly (Labour)
2022	David Crichton (SNP)	Lorraine Nolan (Conservative)	Paul Kelly (Labour)

== Election Results ==
=== 2022 Election ===
Motherwell West - 3 seats
Party	Candidate	FPv%	Count					
Party	Candidate	FPv%	1	2	3	4	5	6
SNP	David Crichton	27.4	1,261					
Labour	Paul Kelly (incumbent)	24.0	1,105	1,109	1,364			
Conservative	Lorraine Nolan	18.9	869	869	896	943	1,003	1,271
SNP	Lindsay Evans	13.6	626	722	737	767	1,001	
Scottish Green	Gordon Thomas Miller	8.1	372	378	401	445		
Labour	Megan McCann	7.9	363	364				
Electorate: 11,093 Valid: 4,596 Spoilt: 168 Quota: 1,150 Turnout: 4,764 (42.9%)

=== 2017 Election ===
2017 North Lanarkshire Council election

Motherwell West - 3 seats
Party	Candidate	FPv%	Count						
Party	Candidate	FPv%	1	2	3	4	5	6	7
Conservative	Meghan Gallacher	21.99	1,002	1,019	1,047	1,097	1,163		
SNP	Annette Valentine (incumbent)	21.15	964	970	1,009	1,047	1,080	1,081	1,854
Labour	Paul Kelly (incumbent)	20.12	917	923	958	1,453			
SNP	Jamie Super	16.74	763	773	808	834	867	869	
Labour	Michael Ross (incumbent)	14	638	652	673				
RISE	Julie Fleming	4.08	186	207					
Independent Alliance North Lanarkshire	Elaine McSpadden	1.91	87						
Electorate: 10,585 Valid: 4,557 Spoilt: 111 Quota: 1,140 Turnout: 4,668 (44.1%)

=== 2012 Election ===
2012 North Lanarkshire Council election

Motherwell West - 3 seats
Party	Candidate	FPv%	Count		
Party	Candidate	FPv%	1	2	3
SNP	Annette Valentine (incumbent)	32.1%	1,256		
Labour	Paul Kelly (incumbent)	29.5%	1,156		
Labour	Michael Ross (incumbent)	22.3%	874	949.4	1,098.9
Conservative	Robert Burgess	13.7%	535	579.4	583.7
TUSC	Kenny Martin	2.4%	95	152.1	156.4
Electorate: 10,511 Valid: 3,916 Spoilt: 74 Quota: 980 Turnout: 3,990 (37.96%)

=== 2007 Election ===
2007 North Lanarkshire Council election

North Lanarkshire council election, 2007: Motherwell West
Party	Candidate	FPv%	%	Seat	Count
SNP	Annette Valentine	1,573	30.9	1	3
Labour	Michael Ross	1,270	24.9	1	2
Labour	Paul Kelly	1,237	24.3	1	3
Conservative	Robert Burgess	812	15.9		
Independent	Gordon Weir	205	4.0		
