= Motherwell North (ward) =

Electoral ward in North Lanarkshire, Scotland

Location of the ward

Motherwell North is one of the twenty-one wards used to elect members of the North Lanarkshire Council. It elects four councillors and covers part of Motherwell (the Cleekhimin, Coursington and Globe neighbourhoods) plus the nearby, adjoining villages of Carfin, Newarthill and most of New Stevenston (other than streets north of the Shotts Line railway tracks), with a combined population of 18,191 in 2019; created in 2007, its boundaries remained unchanged in a 2017 national review.

== Councillors ==
Election	Councillors			
2007	Gordon Stewart (SNP)	Peter Nolan (Labour)	Annita McAuley (Labour)	Helen McKenna (Labour)
2012	Shahid Farooq (SNP/ Alba)	Peter Nolan (Labour)	Annita McAuley (Labour)	Helen McKenna (Labour)
2014 by-	Shahid Farooq (SNP/ Alba)	Peter Nolan (Labour)	Pat O'Rourke (Labour)	Helen McKenna (Labour)
2017	Shahid Farooq (SNP/ Alba)	Ann Weir (SNP)	Pat O'Rourke (Labour)	Olivia Carson (Labour)
2021	Shahid Farooq (SNP/ Alba)	Ann Weir (SNP)	Pat O'Rourke (Labour)	Olivia Carson (Labour)
2022	Gerry Brennan (SNP)	Anne Thomas (SNP)	Andrew Duffy-Lawson (Labour)	Ayeshah Khan (Labour)

== Election results ==
=== 2017 Election ===
2017 North Lanarkshire Council election

Motherwell North - 4 seats
Party	Candidate	FPv%	Count					
Party	Candidate	FPv%	1	2	3	4	5	6
SNP	Shahid Farooq (incumbent)	19.83	1,123	1,173				
SNP	Ann Weir	19.37	1,097	1,164				
Labour	Pat O'Rourke (incumbent)	18.38	1,041	1,182				
Labour	Olivia Carson	16.46	932	1,018	1,057	1,072	1,084	1,582
Conservative	Ashley Baird	16.03	908	988	989	992	994	
Independent Alliance North Lanarkshire	Helen McKenna (incumbent)	9.92	562					
Electorate: 13,646 Valid: 5,663 Spoilt: 164 Quota: 1,133 Turnout: 5,827 (42.7%)

=== 2012 Election ===
2012 North Lanarkshire Council election

Motherwell North - 4 seats
Party	Candidate	FPv%	Count						
Party	Candidate	FPv%	1	2	3	4	5	6	7
Labour	Peter Nolan (incumbent)	31.1%	1,548						
Labour	Helen McKenna (incumbent)	18.9%	941	1,329.3					
Labour	Annita McAuley (incumbent)	18.0%	897	965.6	1,244.8				
SNP	Shahid Farooq	13.9%	689	709.4	721.9	736.1	757.9	782.6	1,304.8
SNP	Gordon Stewart (incumbent)	11.5%	572	588.1	596.9	612.1	631.9	691.5	
Conservative	Neil Richardson	4.4%	217	224.1	228.1	235.8	278		
Liberal Democrats	Fraser MacGregor	2.2%	109	115.1	118.3	130.2			
Electorate: 13,573 Valid: 4,973 Spoilt: 87 Quota: 995 Turnout: 5,060 (37.28%)

- On 8 March 2016, Labour councillors Helen McKenna and Peter Nolan resigned from the party and became Independents.

==== 2014 by-election ====
Labour councillor Annita McAuley died on 23 October 2013. A by-election was held on 23 January 2014 and the seat was retained by Labour's Pat O'Rourke.

Motherwell North By-election (23 January 2014) - 1 Seat
Party	Candidate	FPv%	Count
Party	Candidate	FPv%	1
Labour	Pat O'Rourke	68.2	1,719
SNP	Jordan Linden	20.6	520
Conservative	Bob Burgess	6.9	173
UKIP	Neil Wilson	4.2	107
Electorate: Valid: 2,519 Spoilt: 38 Quota: 1,260 Turnout: 2,557 (18.4%)

=== 2007 Election ===
2007 North Lanarkshire Council election

North Lanarkshire council election, 2007: Motherwell North
Party	Candidate	FPv%	%	Seat	Count
Labour	Peter Nolan	1,532	23.4	1	1
SNP	Gordon Stewart	1,480	22.6	1	1
Labour	Helen McKenna	1,234	18.9	1	2
Labour	Annita McAuley	1,067	16.3	1	7
Liberal Democrats	Stuart Douglas	465	7.1		
Conservative	Neil Richardson	383	5.9		
Independent	Tom Kennedy	379	5.8		
