= Motherwell South East and Ravenscraig (ward) =

Electoral ward in North Lanarkshire, Scotland

Location of the ward

Motherwell South East and Ravenscraig is one of the twenty-one wards used to elect members of the North Lanarkshire Council. It elects four councillors and covers much of the town of Motherwell (roughly all the territory east of the Argyle Line railway up to the station including the town centre, Airbles, Muirhouse and the developing suburb of Ravenscraig), as well as Craigneuk and Wishawhill in Wishaw, with a population of 18,497 in 2019; created in 2007, its boundaries remained unchanged in a 2017 national review.

== Councillors ==
Election	Councillors			
2007	Alan Valentine; SNP	Tommy Luny; Labour	Kaye Harmon; Labour	Linsey McKay (Conservative)
2012	Alan Valentine; SNP	Tommy Luny; Labour	Kaye Harmon; Labour	Gary O'Rorke (Labour)
2017	Alan Valentine; SNP	Kenneth Duffy; Labour	Nathan Wilson; Conservative	Agnes Magowan (SNP)
2022	David Robb; SNP	Kenneth Duffy; Labour	Nathan Wilson; Conservative	Agnes Magowan (SNP)
2023	David Robb; SNP	Kenneth Duffy; Labour	Nathan Wilson; Conservative	Kaye Harmon; Labour

== Election results ==
=== 2023 By-election ===
In August 2023, SNP councillor Agnes Magowan resigned for personal reasons. A by-election, held on 16 November 2023, was won by Labour's Kaye Harmon.

Motherwell South East and Ravenscraig (16 November 2023) – 1 seat
Party	Candidate	FPv%	Count						
Party	Candidate	FPv%	1	2	3	4	5	6	7
Labour	Kaye Harmon	43.3	1,368	1,369	1,379	1,398	1,427	1,479	1,642
SNP	Rosa Zambonini	29.6	934	936	964	974	976	1,087	1,103
Conservative	Oyebola Ajala	9.4	296	299	300	305	345	357	
Green	Derek Watson	8.1	255	257	258	266	269		
BUP	Billy Acheson	3.0	96	101	102	107			
Liberal Democrats	Robert Stewart McGeorge	2.2	68	68	73				
Alba	Mark Shields	2.1	66	66					
UKIP	Neil Wilson	0.8	24						
Electorate: 15,794 Valid: 3,107 Spoilt: 48 Quota: 1,554 Turnout: 20.0%

=== 2022 Election ===
Motherwell South East and Ravenscraig - 4 seats
Party	Candidate	FPv%	Count							
Party	Candidate	FPv%	1	2	3	4	5	6	7	8
SNP	Agnes Magowan (incumbent)	32.0	1,941							
Labour	Kenneth Duffy (incumbent)	22.6	1,368							
Conservative	Nathan Wilson (incumbent)	16.7	1,010	1,025	1,032	1,033	1,039	1,048	1,090	1,316
SNP	David Robb	10.8	653	1,263						
Labour	Michael Ross	8.7	525	543	657	665	672	688	874	
Green	Derek Watson	7.8	472	514	522	542	551	563		
Scottish Family	James Joseph Mitchell	0.9	54	62	66	67	70			
UKIP	Neil Wilson	0.7	40	40	40	40				
Electorate: 15,549 Valid: 6,063 Spoilt: 190 Quota: 1,213 Turnout: 6,253 (40.2%)

=== 2017 Election ===
2017 North Lanarkshire Council election

Motherwell South East & Ravenscraig - 4 seats
Party	Candidate	FPv%	Count											
Party	Candidate	FPv%	1	2	3	4	5	6	7	8	9	10	11	12
SNP	Agnes Magowan	25.27	1,507											
Conservative	Nathan Wilson	19.92	1,188	1,192	1,193	1,193	1,194	1,218						
SNP	Alan Valentine (incumbent)	16.16	964	1,224										
Labour	Kenneth Duffy	14.4	859	866	868	870	874	877	879	892	923	958	1,039	1,591
Labour	Kaye Harmon (incumbent)	9.81	565	573	575	576	578	582	586	599	622	649	754	
Independent Alliance North Lanarkshire	Gary O'Rorke (incumbent)	5.45	325	331	332	333	336	342	344	365	377	433		
Independent	Ian Glenny	2.78	166	188	190	198	199	201	203	241	273			
Green	Ben Adams	2.43	145	150	157	159	169	175	176	185				
Independent	Ian Kelly	2.2	131	134	135	137	140	147	148					
UKIP	Neil Wilson	1.14	68	68	69	69	69							
Solidarity	James Mitchell	0.42	25	27	28	29								
Independent	Deryck Beaumont	0.35	21	21	22									
Electorate: 14,254 Valid: 5,964 Spoilt: 151 Quota: 1,197 Turnout: 6,115 (42.9%)

=== 2012 Election ===
2012 North Lanarkshire Council election

Motherwell South East & Ravenscraig - 4 seats
Party	Candidate	FPv%	Count							
Party	Candidate	FPv%	1	2	3	4	5	6	7	8
Labour	Kaye Harmon (incumbent)	20.9%	944							
SNP	Alan Valentine (incumbent)	19.6%	885	886.7	897.7	934.8				
Labour	Tommy Lunny (incumbent)	14.5%	654	675.4	683.5	706.8	707.9	740.9	794.9	921.6
Labour	Gary O'Rorke†††††††††	14.0%	633	641.9	644.9	674.2	675.9	701.2	742.4	821.2
SNP	Jamie Super	12.2%	550	550.8	551.8	565.8	588.4	623.7	694.2	
Conservative	Linsey McKay (incumbent)	6.9%	311	312	324	333	333.9			
Independent	Ian Kelly	5.5%	247	248.8	259.8	337.9	339.5	427		
Independent	Hugh McLaughlin	5.2%	236	236.8	240.8					
Scottish Christian	Brian Ross	1.3%	58	58.3						
Electorate: 13,218 Valid: 4,518 Spoilt: 124 Quota: 904 Turnout: 4,642 (35.12%)

Labour councillor Gary O'Rorke resigned from the party and became Independent on 21 November 2016.

=== 2007 Election ===
2007 North Lanarkshire Council election

North Lanarkshire council election, 2007: Motherwell South East & Ravenscraig
Party	Candidate	FPv%	%	Seat	Count
SNP	Alan Valentine	2,048	34.5	1	1
Labour	Tommy Luny	1,153	19.4	1	2
Labour	Kaye Harmon	1,014	17.1	1	5
Labour	Gary O'Rorke	782	13.2		
Conservative	Linsey McKay	699	11.8	1	5
Scottish Socialist	Joyce Carmichael	240	4.0		
