= Murdostoun (ward) =

Electoral ward in North Lanarkshire, Scotland

Location of the ward

Murdostoun is one of the twenty-one wards used to elect members of the North Lanarkshire Council. It elects four councillors and covers the settlements of Cleland, Dalziel Park and Newmains plus the Coltness and Cambusnethan areas of Wishaw, with a combined population of 20,485 in 2019; created in 2007, its territory remained almost unchanged in a 2017 national review, other than the addition of a few streets by moving a section of the boundary south from the Temple Gill burn to the edge of Belhaven Park.

== Councillors ==
Election	Councillors			
2007	John Taggart (SNP)	Jimmy Martin (Labour)	Nicky Shevlin (Labour)	Robert McKendrick (Ind.)
2012	John Taggart (SNP)	Alan Clinch (Labour)	Nicky Shevlin (Labour)	Robert McKendrick (Ind.)
2017	Cameron McManus (SNP)	Louise Roarty (Labour)	Nicky Shevlin (Labour)	Robert McKendrick (Ind.)
2022	Cameron McManus (SNP)	Louise Roarty (Labour)	Nicky Shevlin (Labour)	Robert McKendrick (Ind.)

== Election results ==
=== 2022 Election ===
- 2017: 2xLab; 1xSNP; 1xInd
- 2022: 2xLab; 1xSNP; 1xInd
- 2017-2022: No change

Murdostoun - 4 seats
Party	Candidate	FPv%	Count						
Party	Candidate	FPv%	1	2	3	4	5	6	7
Independent	Robert John McKendrick (incumbent)	27.2	1,545						
SNP	Cameron McManus (incumbent)	19.4	1,106	1,167					
Labour	Louise Roarty (incumbent)	15.0	853	914	916	986	1,191		
Labour	Nicky Shevlin (incumbent)	13.7	778	834	836	892	1,007	1,049	1,317
SNP	Julia Stachurska	10.3	584	606	629	691	705	708	
Conservative	Linsey McKay	9.1	518	545	545	624			
Independent	Robert Livingston Arthur	5.4	305	394	394				
Electorate: 14,403 Valid: 5,689 Spoilt: 136 Quota: 1,138 Turnout: 5,825 (40.4%)

=== 2017 Election ===
2017 North Lanarkshire Council election

Murdostoun - 4 seats
Party	Candidate	FPv%	Count							
Party	Candidate	FPv%	1	2	3	4	5	6	7	8
Independent	Robert McKendrick (incumbent)	27.55	1,765							
SNP	Cameron McManus	18.89	1,210	1,267	1,270	1,295				
Conservative	Cindy MacKenzie	12.88	825	851	880	914	915	983	1,006	
Labour	Nicky Shevlin (incumbent)	12.21	782	825	829	841	841	931	1,008	1,145
Labour	Louise Roarty	11.52	738	804	810	827	828	859	1,014	1,235
SNP	Anum Qaisar	8.76	561	602	604	614	624	684		
Independent	John Taggart (incumbent)	4.43	284	366	370	452	452			
Independent	Robert Arthur	2.4	154	231	241					
UKIP	Yvonne Millar	1.04	67	77						
Electorate: 13,928 Valid: 6,406 Spoilt: 162 Quota: 1,282 Turnout: 6,568 (46%)

=== 2012 Election ===
2012 North Lanarkshire Council election

Murdostoun - 4 seats
Party	Candidate	FPv%	Count					
Party	Candidate	FPv%	1	2	3	4	5	6
Independent	Robert McKendrick (incumbent)	32.1%	1,751					
Labour	Nicky Shevlin (incumbent)	21.6%	1,178					
Labour	Alan Clinch	14.5%	789	982.1	1,045.4	1,111.3		
SNP	John Taggart (incumbent)	13.4%	729	860.7	867.5	925.7	927.8	1,566.7
SNP	Lyall Duff	12.7%	691	739.9	743.1	779.7	782.9	
Conservative	Cindy MacKenzie	5.9%	321	369.5	371.4			
Electorate: 14,401 Valid: 5,459 Spoilt: 110 Quota: 1,092 Turnout: 5,569 (38.67%)

- SNP councillor John Taggart resigned from the party and became Independent on 10 February 2015 in opposition to the party's 2015 Westminster Election selection procedures.

=== 2007 Election ===
2007 North Lanarkshire Council election

North Lanarkshire council election, 2007: Murdostoun
Party	Candidate	FPv%	%	Seat	Count
Labour	Jimmy Martin	1,449	20.0	1	1
SNP	John Taggart	1,322	18.2	1	4
Independent	Robert McKendrick	1,085	15.0	1	7
Labour	Nicky Shelvin	804	11.1	1	7
Independent	John Lawrie	756	10.4		
Labour	David Moon	654	9.0		
Conservative	Mark Nolan	614	8.5		
Scottish Christian	Tom Selfridge	348	4.8		
Solidarity	William Kelly	212	2.9		
