= North Lanarkshire Council elections =

Local government elections in North Lanarkshire, Scotland

North Lanarkshire Council in Scotland holds elections every five years, previously holding them every four years from its creation as a single-tier authority in 1995 to 2007.

== Council elections ==
Year	SNP	Labour	Conservative	Green	BUP	Liberal Democrats	CICA	Independent
1995	7	60	0	0	0	0	0	2
1999 (Note: New ward boundaries.)	12	56	0	0	0	0	0	2
2003	13	54	0	0	0	0	0	3
2007 (Note: Change to single transferable vote system and new ward boundaries.)	23	40	1	0	0	1	0	5
2012	26	41	0	0	0	0	1	2
2017 (Note: New ward boundaries.)	33	32	10	0	0	0	0	2
2022	36	32	5	1	1	0	0	2

== Results maps ==
1999 results map

2003 results map

== By-elections ==
=== 2003-2007 ===
Kildrum and Park By-Election 16 June 2005
Party	Candidate	Votes	%	±%
SNP		870	58.9	+2.7
Labour		445	30.1	−3.8
Scottish Socialist		59	4.0	−5.9
Independent		55	3.7	+3.7
Liberal Democrats		37	2.5	+2.5
Conservative		12	0.8	+0.8
Majority		425	28.8	
Turnout		1,478		
SNP hold		Swing		

Kirkshaws By-Election 8 December 2005
Party	Candidate	Votes	%	±%
Labour		555	68.9	−11.8
SNP		185	23.0	+3.7
Conservative		35	4.3	+4.3
Scottish Socialist		30	3.7	+3.7
Majority		370	46.0	
Turnout		805		
Labour hold		Swing		

=== 2007-2012 ===
Kilsyth By-Election 31 January 2008
Party	Candidate	FPv%	Count
Party	Candidate	FPv%	1
Labour	Mark Griffin	63.4	1,855
SNP	Claire Fyvie	30.4	891
Green	Rob Kay	2.3	66
Conservative	Robert Burgess	1.7	50
Scottish Socialist	Willie O'Neill	1.6	48
Liberal Democrats	Stuart Douglas	0.6	17
Labour hold			
Valid: 2,927 Spoilt: 20 Quota: 1,465 Turnout: 2,947

Coatbridge North and Glenboig By-Election 4 June 2009
Party	Candidate	FPv%	Count					
Party	Candidate	FPv%	1	2	3	4	5	6
Labour	Peter Sullivan	37.2	1,529	1,542	1,558	1,577	1,615	1,759
SNP	Allan Stubbs	30.5	1,254	1,276	1,307	1,357	1,446	1,696
Independent	Julie McAnulty	13.5	557	565	604	635	730	
Conservative	Bob Burgess	8.8	361	365	372	387		
Independent	Hugh Banford	5.3	217	218	218			
Green	Kristofer Keane	2.8	115	126				
Scottish Socialist	Fraser Coats	2.0	81					
Labour gain from SNP								
Valid: 4,114 Spoilt: 67 Quota: 2058 Turnout: 4,181

Coatbridge North and Glenboig By-Election 27 October 2011
Party	Candidate	FPv%	Count
Party	Candidate	FPv%	1
Labour	Michael McPake	52.3	1,527
SNP	Julie McAnulty	39.0	1,139
Conservative	Bob Burgess	6.0	174
Liberal Democrats	Graham Dale	2.7	78
Labour hold			
Valid: 2,919 Spoilt: 15 Quota: 1,460 Turnout: 2,934

=== 2012-2017 ===
Coatbridge West By-Election 28 February 2013
Party	Candidate	FPv%	Count
Party	Candidate	FPv%	1
Labour	Kevin Docherty	78.8	2,145
SNP	Patrick Rolink	16.6	452
Conservative	Ashley Baird	2.6	71
UKIP	Billy Mitchell	1.2	34
Liberal Democrats	John Love	0.7	19
Labour hold			
Valid: 2,721 Spoilt: 27 Quota: 1,361 Turnout: 2,748

Motherwell North By-Election 23 January 2014
Party	Candidate	FPv%	Count
Party	Candidate	FPv%	1
Labour	Pat O'Rourke	68.2	1,719
SNP	Jordan Linden	20.6	520
Conservative	Bob Burgess	6.9	173
UKIP	Neil Wilson	4.2	107
Labour hold			
Valid: 2,519 Spoilt: 38 Quota: 1,260 Turnout: 2,557

Thorniewood By-Election 9 July 2015
Party	Candidate	FPv%	Count					
Party	Candidate	FPv%	1	2	3	4	5	6
SNP	Steven Bonnar	47.0	1,555	1,556	1,565	1,586	1,622	1,647
Labour	Hugh Gaffney	42.6	1,410	1,417	1,422	1,433	1,456	1,517
Conservative	Meghan Gallacher	4.5	149	158	167	172	175	
Scottish Socialist	Liam McCabe	2.5	81	81	82	89		
Green	Patrick McAleer	1.5	51	55	61			
Scottish Christian	Craig Smith	1.0	33	37				
UKIP	Matt Williams	0.88%	29					
SNP hold								
Valid: 3,308 Spoilt: 38 Quota: 1,655 Turnout: 3,346

Wishaw By-Election 13 August 2015
Party	Candidate	FPv%	Count
Party	Candidate	FPv%	1
SNP	Rosa Zambonini	51.1	1,915
Labour	Peter McDade	32.8	1,230
Conservative	Marjory Borthwick	10.3	385
Scottish Socialist	Maria Feeney	3.1	117
UKIP	Neil Wilson	1.8	67
Liberal Democrats	Gerard Neary	1.0	37
SNP hold			
Valid: 3,751 Spoilt: 43 Quota: 1,876 Turnout: 3,794

Coatbridge North and Glenboig By-Election 22 September 2016
Party	Candidate	FPv%	Count			
Party	Candidate	FPv%	1	2	3	4
Labour	Alex McVey	41.7	1,350			1,572
SNP	Stephen Kirley	39.0	1,261			1,378
Conservative	Ben Callaghan	11.3	366			
Green	John Wilson	6.0	195			
UKIP	Neil Wilson	1.9	63			
Labour gain from SNP						
Electorate: Valid: 3,235 Spoilt: 42 Quota: 1,618 Turnout: 3,277 (23.67%)

=== 2017-2022 ===
Fortissat By-Election 7 September 2017
Party	Candidate	FPv%	Count						
Party	Candidate	FPv%	1	2	3	4	5	6	7
Labour	Clare Quigley	38.5	1,420	1,421	1,426	1,466	1,546	1,827	2,117
BUP	John Jo Leckie	23.3	858	865	867	913	1,088	1,139	
SNP	Mags Murphy	20.6	761	762	770	791	804		
Conservative	Norma McNab	11.5	424	427	428	459			
Independent	Charlie Cefferty	5.0	184	184	188				
Green	Kyle Davidson	0.7	24	26					
UKIP	Daryl Gardner	0.5	18						
Labour gain from Conservative									
Valid: 3,689 Spoilt: 47 Quota: 1,845 Turnout: 3,736

Coatbridge South By-Election 25 October 2018
Party	Candidate	FPv%	Count					
Party	Candidate	FPv%	1	2	3	4	5	6
Labour	Geraldine Woods	42.2	1,355	1,360	1,364	1,380	1,549	2,070
SNP	Lesley Mitchell	41.8	1,343	1,344	1,346	1,360	1,405	
Conservative	Ben Callaghan	13.8	492	494	496	499		
Green	Rosemary McGowan	1.5	47	50	51			
UKIP	Neil Wilson	0.4	14	14				
Liberal Democrats	Christopher Wilson	0.4	13					
Labour hold								
Valid: 3,264 Spoilt: 48 Quota: 1,633 Turnout: 3,312

Thorniewood By-Election 19 September 2019
Party	Candidate	FPv%	Count				
Party	Candidate	FPv%	1	2	3	4	5
Labour	Norah Moody	44.3	1,362	1,370	1,424	1,528	2,043
SNP	Eve Cunnington	39.1	1,202	1,221	1,245	1,271	
Conservative	Lorraine Nolan	9.6	296	298	335		
Liberal Democrats	Colin Robb	5.5	168	176			
Green	Rosemary McGowan	1.5	46				
Labour hold							
Valid: 3,074 Quota: 1,538

Fortissat By-Election 4 March 2021
Party	Candidate	FPv%	Count			
Party	Candidate	FPv%	1	2	3	4
Labour	Peter Kelly	38.4	1,071	1,073	1,093	1,408
SNP	Sarah Quinn	34.6	965	970	994	1,026
Conservative	Ben Callaghan	23.5	656	664	679	
Green	Kyle Davidson	2.5	69	74		
UKIP	Neil Wilson	1.1	31			
Labour gain from SNP						
Valid: 2,792 Spoilt: 29 Quota: 1,397 Turnout: 2,821

Thorniewood By-Election 4 March 2021
Party	Candidate	FPv%	Count				
Party	Candidate	FPv%	1	2	3	4	5
Labour	Helen Loughran	36.4	998	999	1,018	1,112	1,263
SNP	Eve Cunnington	34.5	944	944	960	971	1,160
Independent	Joseph Budd	18.9	518	520	528	558	
Conservative	Oyebola Ajala	7.7	212	215	220		
Green	Rosemary McGowan	1.9	53	57			
UKIP	Daryl Gardner	0.5	15				
Labour gain from SNP							
Valid: 2,740 Spoilt: 29 Quota: 1,371 Turnout: 2,769

Murdostoun By-Election 24 June 2021
Party	Candidate	FPv%	Count						
Party	Candidate	FPv%	1	2	3	4	5	6	7
Independent	Robert John McKendrick	41.2	1,504	1,504	1,507	1,515	1,566	1,681	1,873
SNP	Julia Stachurska	24.2	884	884	884	906	918	968	1,060
Labour	Chris Roartry	16.9	617	617	618	632	702	729	
Independent	Robert Arthur	8.0	293	296	299	303	334		
Conservative	Cindy Mackenzie	7.2	264	265	265	267			
Green	Nathaniel Hamiltion	1.8	61	62	62				
ISP	Julie Mcanulty	0.4	14	14					
Reform	Billy Ross	0.2	7						
Independent hold									
Electorate: 14,488 Valid: 3,644 Spoilt: 43 Quota: 1,823 Turnout: 3,687

=== 2022-2027 ===
Bellshill By-Election 15 June 2023
Party	Candidate	FPv%	Count
Party	Candidate	FPv%	1
Labour	Anne McCrory	51.8	1,440
SNP	Joseph Budd	27.1	753
Conservative	Colin Cameron	8.5	236
BUP	Billy Ross	4.3	120
Alba	John Marshall	3.9	107
Green	Rosemary McGowan	1.6	44
Liberal Democrats	John Arthur Henry Cole	1.2	34
Scottish Family	Leo Francis Lanahan	1.1	30
Freedom Alliance (UK)	Simona Panaitescu	0.3	7
UKIP	Neil Wilson	0.3	7
Labour gain from SNP			
Valid: 2,778 Spoilt: 41 Quota: 1,390 Turnout: 2,819

Motherwell South East and Ravenscraig By-Election 16 November 2023
Party	Candidate	FPv%	Count						
Party	Candidate	FPv%	1	2	3	4	5	6	7
Labour	Kaye Harmon	44.0	1,368	1,369	1,379	1,398	1,427	1,479	1,642
SNP	Rosa Zambonini	30.1	934	936	964	974	976	1,087	1,103
Conservative	Oyebola Ajala	9.5	296	299	300	305	345	357	
Green	Derek Watson	8.2	255	257	258	266	269		
BUP	Billy Acheson	3.1	96	101	102	107			
Liberal Democrats	Robert Stewart McGeorge	2.2	68	68	73				
Alba	Mark Shields	2.1	66	66					
UKIP	Neil Wilson	0.8	24						
Labour gain from SNP									
Valid: 3,107 Spoilt: 48 Quota: 1,554 Turnout: 3,155

Fortissat By-Election 10 October 2024
Party	Candidate	FPv%	Count					
Party	Candidate	FPv%	1	2	3	4	5	6
Labour	Clare Quigley	36.6	807	818	834	892	1,007	1,292
Progressive Change North Lanarkshire	Mary McIntosh	24.0	529	542	556	634	757	
SNP	Brendan McAleese	20.3	447	452	457	466		
BUP	Billy Acheson	10.9	241	245	297			
Conservative	Sheila Cameron	5.6	124	131				
Liberal Democrats	Leigh Butler	2.6	57					
Labour hold								
Valid: 2,205 Spoilt: 22 Quota: 1,103 Turnout: 2,227

Mossend and Holytown By-Election 10 October 2024
Party	Candidate	FPv%	Count					
Party	Candidate	FPv%	1	2	3	4	5	6
Labour	Helena Gray	36.5	616	616	640	668	722	926
SNP	Shahnawaz Khan	34.8	586	586	593	600	633	
Reform	Duncan McMillan	15.5	263	268	276	321		
Conservative	Aimee Alexander	7.5	127	127	141			
Liberal Democrats	John Cole	5.0	83	84				
UKIP	Neil Wilson	0.6	11					
Labour hold								
Valid: 1,686 Spoilt: 27 Quota: 844 Turnout: 1,713
