= North Lanarkshire Council =

Scottish unitary authority council in North Lanarkshire, Scotland

North Lanarkshire Council Comhairle Lannraig a Tuath
- Coat of arms

- Council logo

Leadership
- Provost: Kenneth Duffy, Labour since 25 August 2022
- Leader: Jim Logue, Labour since 11 August 2022
- Chief Executive: Des Murray since 2018

Structure
- Seats: 77 councillors
- Graph of the party split among 77 seats.
- Political groups: Administration (31) Labour (31) Other parties (46) SNP (24) PCNL (7) Conservative (5) Green (1) BUP (1) Independent (8)

Elections
- Voting system: Single transferable vote
- Last election: 5 May 2022
- Next election: 6 May 2027

Meeting place
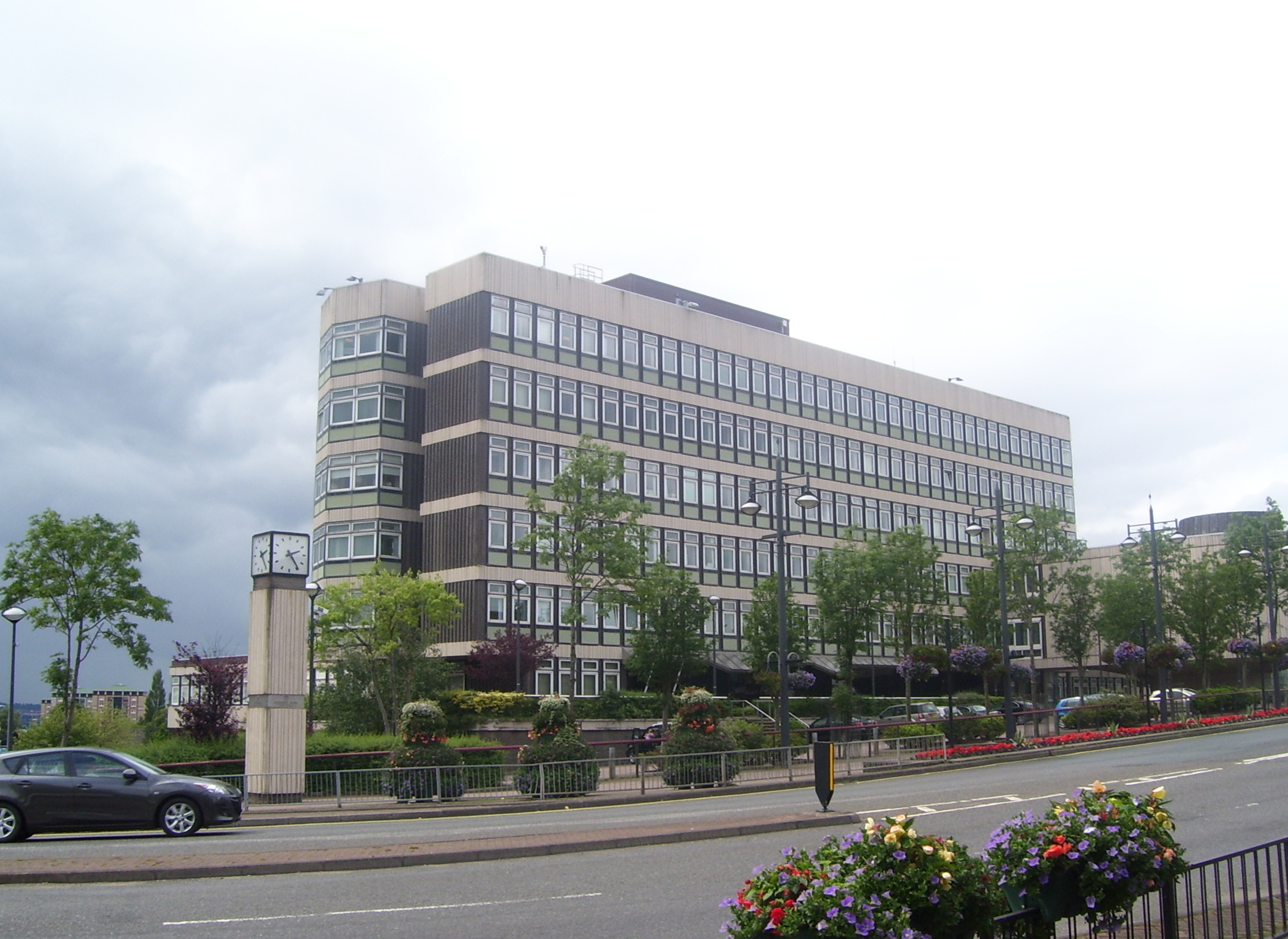
- Civic Centre, Windmillhill Street, Motherwell, ML1 1AB

Website
- www.northlanarkshire.gov.uk

North Lanarkshire Council (Scottish Gaelic: Comhairle Lannraig a Tuath) is one of the 32 local authorities of Scotland, covering the North Lanarkshire council area. The council is the second largest Scottish council by number of councillors, having 77 members. The council has been under no overall control since 2017 and has been led by a Labour minority administration since 2022. It is based at Motherwell Civic Centre.

== Political control ==
The council has been under no overall control since 2017. Since August 2022 the council has been led by a Labour minority administration.

The first election to North Lanarkshire Council was held in 1995, initially operating as a shadow authority alongside the outgoing authorities until the new system came into force on 1 April 1996. Political control of the council since 1996 has been as follows:

Party in control	Years
Labour	1996–2017
No overall control	2017–present

=== Leadership ===
The role of provost is largely ceremonial in North Lanarkshire. They preside at full council meetings and act as the council's civic figurehead. Political leadership is provided by the leader of the council. The leaders since 1996 have been:

Councillor	Party	From	To
Harry McGuigan	Labour	1 Apr 1996	17 Sep 1998
Jim McCabe	Labour	17 Sep 1998	29 Feb 2016
Jim Logue	Labour	8 Mar 2016	May 2022
Jordan Linden	SNP	19 May 2022	27 Jul 2022
Jim Logue	Labour	11 Aug 2022	

=== Composition ===
Following the 2022 election and subsequent changes of allegiance and by-elections up to October 2026, the composition of the council was:

Party	Seats
Labour	31
Scottish National Party	24
Progressive Change North Lanarkshire	7
Conservative	5
Green	1
British Unionist Party	1
Independent	8
Total	77

Progressive Change North Lanarkshire was registered as a political party in July 2024. It had previously been a group of independents, all of whom had been elected as SNP councillors. The next election is due in 2027.

== Premises ==
The council is based at Motherwell Civic Centre on Windmillhill Street in Motherwell. The building was built between 1965 and 1970 for the former Motherwell and Wishaw Town Council, and was subsequently used as the headquarters of Motherwell District Council between 1975 and 1996.

== Elections ==
Since 2007 elections have been held every five years under the single transferable vote system, introduced by the Local Governance (Scotland) Act 2004. Election results since 1995 have been as follows:

Year	Seats	SNP	Labour	Conservative	BUP	Green	Liberal Democrats	Independent / Other	Notes
1995	69	7	59	0	0	0	0	3	Labour majority
1999	70	12	56	0	0	0	0	2	New ward boundaries. Labour majority
2003	70	13	54	0	0	0	0	3	Labour majority
2007	70	23	40	1	0	0	1	5	New ward boundaries.
2012	70	26	41	0	0	0	0	3	Labour majority
2017	77	33	32	10	0	0	0	2	New ward boundaries. Labour minority
2022	77	36	32	5	1	1	0	2	SNP minority until August 2022, then Labour minority.

=== Wards ===
Map of North Lanarkshire's 21 wards, using 2017 boundaries

The council is made up of 21 wards, as follows:

Ward Number	Ward Name	Location	Population (2017)
1	Kilsyth		11,832
2	Cumbernauld North		19,670
3	Cumbernauld South		16,206
4	Cumbernauld East		16,608
5	Stepps, Chryston and Muirhead		11,623
6	Gartcosh, Glenboig and Moodiesburn		13,438
7	Coatbridge North		15,320
8	Airdrie North		20,062
9	Airdrie Central		16,570
10	Coatbridge West		14,213
11	Coatbridge South		17,286
12	Airdrie South		19,803
13	Fortissat		15,706
14	Thorniewood		13,916
15	Bellshill		15,252
16	Mossend and Holytown		12,799
17	Motherwell West		14,129
18	Motherwell North		18,667
19	Motherwell South East and Ravenscraig		20,146
20	Murdostoun		18,489
21	Wishaw		18,225
Total			339,960
