= Coatbridge and Bellshill =

UK Parliament constituency (since 2005)

Coordinates: 55.885°N 4.060°W

- Burgh constituency for the House of Commons
- Interactive map of boundaries from 2024
- Location within Scotland
- Subdivision: North Lanarkshire
- Electorate: 72,507 (March 2020)
- Major settlements: Bellshill, Coatbridge, Moodiesburn, Glenboig, Gartcosh

Current constituency
- Created: 2005 (as Coatbridge, Chryston and Bellshill)
- Member of Parliament: Frank McNally (Labour)
- Created from: Coatbridge and Chryston and Hamilton North and Bellshill

Coatbridge and Bellshill is a constituency of the House of Commons of the Parliament of the United Kingdom. It elects one Member of Parliament (MP) using the first-past-the-post voting system. It has been represented since 2024 by Frank McNally of Scottish Labour.

Prior to the 2023 review of Westminster constituencies, which came into effect for the 2024 general election, the constituency was known as Coatbridge, Chryston and Bellshill.

== History ==
Under the Fifth Review of UK Parliament constituencies, which came into effect for the 2005 general election, the constituency was created as Coatbridge, Chryston and Bellshill. It was the successor to the Coatbridge and Chryston constituency, with the addition of the town of Bellshill from the abolished constituency of Hamilton North and Bellshill.

Further to the completion of the 2023 review, the seat was subject to boundary changes which resulted in the loss of Chryston to Cumbernauld and Kirkintilloch. As a consequence, it was renamed Coatbridge and Bellshill, first contested at the 2024 general election.

Traditionally, the area served by the seat and its predecessors was the safest Labour area in Scotland. The area consistently returned Labour MPs from 1935 until 2015 when the Scottish National Party gained the seat from Scottish Labour on an unprecedented 36% swing, unseating the incumbent Tom Clarke MP who had represented the area since the 1982 Coatbridge and Airdrie by-election. Since 2015, the seat has changed hands several times. Once back to Labour in 2017, with Hugh Gaffney unseating the Scottish National Party incumbent Phil Boswell. The seat then swung back to the SNP in 2019, with Steven Bonnar gaining the seat. In 2024, the seat again swung back to Labour with Frank McNally gaining the seat from the SNP incumbent Steven Bonnar.

== Boundaries ==
=== 2005–2024 (Coatbridge, Chryston and Bellshill) ===
Under the Fifth Review of UK Parliament constituencies, the boundaries were defined in accordance with the ward structure in place on 30 November 2004. Further to reviews of local government ward boundaries which came into effect in 2007 and 2017, but did not affect the parliamentary boundaries, the constituency comprised the following wards or part wards of North Lanarkshire Council:

- In full: Gartcosh, Glenboig and Moodiesburn, Coatbridge South, Coatbridge West, Thorniewood.
- Most: Stepps, Chryston and Muirhead, Coatbridge North, Bellshill.
- Small part: Cumbernauld North, Mossend and Holytown.

=== 2024–present (Coatbridge and Bellshill) ===
As a result of the 2023 review of Westminster constituencies, the seat lost Chryston to Cumbernauld and Kirkintilloch. The newly named constituency comprises the following wards of North Lanarkshire Council:

- In full: Gartcosh, Glenboig and Moodiesburn, Coatbridge North, Coatbridge South, Coatbridge West, Thorniewood, Bellshill.
- In part: Airdrie Central (very small area), Mossend and Holytown (Mossend area).

== Constituency profile ==
The constituency covers the west of the North Lanarkshire council area, and is predominantly urban. Coatbridge lies relatively central within the constituency, with the urban/rural mix to the north encompassing the villages of Glenboig, Moodiesburn and Gartcosh. Bellshill lies within the southern most part of the constituency.

Electoral Calculus characterises the seat as 'Traditionalist', with left-wing economic views but less liberal social attitudes. The average age in the constituency is 47.6, which puts it just below the UK and Scottish averages. Employment in the constituency is at 64%, putting it broadly in line with the rest of Scotland and above the overall UK average of 58%. Home ownership in the constituency is below both the Scottish and UK averages, at 59%. Additionally, Electoral Calculus puts the ethnic demography of the constituency as 98% white, above both Scottish and UK averages.

== Members of Parliament ==
Coatbridge, Chryston and Bellshill

Election	Member	Party
2005	Tom Clarke	Labour
2015	Phil Boswell	Scottish National Party
2017	Hugh Gaffney	Labour
2019	Steven Bonnar	Scottish National Party

Coatbridge and Bellshill

Election	Member	Party
2024	Frank McNally	Labour

== Election results ==
=== Elections in the 2020s ===
2024 general election: Coatbridge and Bellshill
Party	Candidate	Votes	%	±%
Labour	Frank McNally	19,291	49.8	+13.5
SNP	Steven Bonnar	12,947	33.4	−13.9
Reform	Fionna McRae	2,601	6.7	New
Conservative	Christina Sandhu	1,382	3.6	−8.3
Green	Patrick McAleer	1,229	3.2	+1.7
Liberal Democrats	Emma Farthing	671	1.7	−1.3
Scottish Family	Leo Lanahan	429	1.1	New
Communist	Drew Gilchrist	181	0.5	New
Majority		6,344	16.4	N/A
Turnout		38,731	53.3	−10.0
Registered electors		72,667		
Labour gain from SNP		Swing	+13.7	

=== Elections in the 2010s ===
2019 notional result (Note: Estimate of the 2019 general election result as if the revised boundaries recommended under the 2023 boundary review were in place)
Party	Vote	%
SNP	21,730	47.3
Labour	16,646	36.3
Conservative	5,444	11.9
Liberal Democrats	1,375	3.0
Scottish Greens	701	1.5
Majority	5,084	11.1
Turnout	45,896	63.3
Electorate	72,507	

2019 general election: Coatbridge, Chryston and Bellshill
Party	Candidate	Votes	%	±%
SNP	Steven Bonnar	22,680	47.0	+7.9
Labour	Hugh Gaffney	17,056	35.4	−7.2
Conservative	Nathan Wilson	6,113	12.7	−3.5
Liberal Democrats	David Stevens	1,564	3.2	+1.2
Green	Patrick McAleer	808	1.7	New
Majority		5,624	11.6	N/A
Turnout		48,221	66.3	+3.0
SNP gain from Labour		Swing	+7.6	

2017 general election: Coatbridge, Chryston and Bellshill
Party	Candidate	Votes	%	±%
Labour	Hugh Gaffney	19,193	42.6	+8.7
SNP	Phil Boswell	17,607	39.1	−17.5
Conservative	Robyn Halbert	7,318	16.2	+9.9
Liberal Democrats	David Bennie	922	2.0	+0.9
Majority		1,586	3.5	N/A
Turnout		45,040	63.3	−5.3
Labour gain from SNP		Swing	+13.1	

2015 general election: Coatbridge, Chryston and Bellshill
Party	Candidate	Votes	%	±%
SNP	Phil Boswell	28,696	56.6	+39.7
Labour	Tom Clarke	17,195	33.9	−32.7
Conservative	Mhairi Fraser	3,209	6.3	−1.8
UKIP	Scott Cairns	1,049	2.1	New
Liberal Democrats	Robert Simpson	549	1.1	−7.4
Majority		11,501	22.7	N/A
Turnout		50,698	68.6	+9.2
SNP gain from Labour		Swing	+36.3	

2010 general election: Coatbridge, Chryston and Bellshill
Party	Candidate	Votes	%	±%
Labour	Tom Clarke	27,728	66.6	+2.1
SNP	Frances M. McGlinchey	7,014	16.9	+3.3
Liberal Democrats	Kenneth C. Elder	3,519	8.5	−3.5
Conservative	Fiona Houston	3,374	8.1	+0.9
Majority		20,714	49.7	−1.2
Turnout		41,635	59.4	+2.5
Labour hold		Swing	−0.6	

=== Elections in the 2000s ===
2005 general election: Coatbridge, Chryston and Bellshill
Party	Candidate	Votes	%	±%
Labour	Tom Clarke	24,725 (Note: This 19,519 majority was the largest numerical majority for any Westminster MP during the 2005-2010 parliament.)	64.5	−4.8
SNP	Duncan Ross	5,206	13.6	−1.2
Liberal Democrats	Rodney Ackland	4,605	12.0	+6.4
Conservative	Lindsay S. Paterson	2,775	7.2	+2.2
Scottish Socialist	Joan Kinloch	1,033	2.7	−2.4
Majority		19,519	50.9	−3.6
Turnout		38,344	56.9	−3.0
Labour win (new seat)				

== Previous constituencies ==
Coatbridge and Chryston – 1997–2005

Monklands West – 1983–1997

Coatbridge and Airdrie – 1950–1983

Coatbridge – 1918–1950
