= 2007 North Lanarkshire Council election =

2007 Scottish local government election

- 3 May 2007

All 70 seats to North Lanarkshire Council 36 seats needed for a majority

Elections to North Lanarkshire Council were held on 3 May 2007, the same day as the other Scottish local government elections and the Scottish Parliament general election. The election was the first one using 20 new wards created as a result of the Local Governance (Scotland) Act 2004, each ward will elect three or four councillors using the single transferable vote system form of proportional representation. The new wards replace 70 single-member wards which used the plurality (first past the post) system of election.

Labour managed to retain control of the council, something which the party failed to do in many other parts of Scotland. Overall they lost 14 seats, most of which went to the Scottish National Party, although the individual seats won by the Conservative Party and the Scottish Liberal Democrats were noteworthy in that these parties had never been represented on North Lanarkshire Council before.

== Election results ==
North Lanarkshire local election result 2007
| Party | Seats | Gains | Losses | Net gain/loss | Seats % | Votes % | Votes | +/− |
|---|---|---|---|---|---|---|---|---|
| Labour | 40 | N/A | N/A | -14 | 57.1 | 49.6 | 60,673 | |
| SNP | 23 | N/A | N/A | +11 | 32.9 | 31.7 | 38,809 | |
| Independent | 5 | N/A | N/A | +1 | 7.1 | 7.0 | 8,510 | |
| Conservative | 1 | N/A | N/A | +1 | 1.4 | 7.5 | 9,212 | |
| Liberal Democrats | 1 | N/A | N/A | +1 | 1.4 | 1.8 | 2,232 | |
| Scottish Socialist | 0 | N/A | N/A | 0 | 0.0 | 1.5 | 1,848 | |
| Solidarity | 0 | N/A | N/A | 0 | 0.0 | 0.6 | 759 | |
| Scottish Christian | 0 | N/A | N/A | 0 | 0.0 | 0.3 | 348 | |

== Ward results ==
North Lanarkshire council election, 2007: Kilsyth
| Party | Candidate | FPv% | % | Seat | Count |
|---|---|---|---|---|---|
| Labour | Francis Griffin | 2,037 | 38.3 | 1 | 1 |
| SNP | David Key | 1,480 | 27.8 | 1 | 1 |
| Labour | Jean Jones | 1,386 | 26.0 | 1 | 1 |
| Conservative | Archie Giggie | 260 | 4.9 | | |
| Scottish Socialist | Willie O'Neill | 162 | 3.0 | | |

North Lanarkshire council election, 2007: Cumbernauld North
| Party | Candidate | FPv% | % | Seat | Count |
|---|---|---|---|---|---|
| SNP | Alan O'Brien | 1,645 | 23.1 | 1 | 1 |
| Labour | Bob Chadha | 1,576 | 22.5 | 1 | 1 |
| Labour | Barry McCulloch | 1,362 | 19.5 | 1 | 3 |
| Independent | Gordon Murray | 727 | 10.4 | 1 | 9 |
| SNP | Norman R Robinson | 641 | 9.2 | | |
| Conservative | Christina Giggie | 375 | 5.4 | | |
| Liberal Democrats | Pamela Wilson | 321 | 4.6 | | |
| Independent | Donald Masterton | 247 | 3.5 | | |
| Scottish Socialist | Davina McNeill | 101 | 1.4 | | |

North Lanarkshire council election, 2007: Cumbernauld South
| Party | Candidate | FPv% | % | Seat | Count |
|---|---|---|---|---|---|
| SNP | William Goldie | 1,871 | 23.3 | 1 | 1 |
| Labour | Danny Carrigan | 1,806 | 22.5 | 1 | 2 |
| Labour | Gerry McElroy | 1,280 | 16.0 | 1 | 8 |
| SNP | William Homer | 791 | 9.9 | 1 | 10 |
| SNP | Neil McCallum | 701 | 8.7 | | |
| Independent | Alan Sneddon | 370 | 4.6 | | |
| Liberal Democrats | Michael Allen | 359 | 4.5 | | |
| Independent | Rose Bowie | 318 | 4.0 | | |
| Conservative | Margaret Hooper | 276 | 3.4 | | |
| Scottish Socialist | Kenny McEwan | 252 | 3.1 | | |

North Lanarkshire council election, 2007: Abronhill, Kildrum and The Village
| Party | Candidate | FPv% | % | Seat | Count |
|---|---|---|---|---|---|
| Labour | Stephen Grant | 1,939 | 31.4 | 1 | 1 |
| SNP | Elizabeth Irvive | 1,753 | 28.4 | 1 | 1 |
| SNP | Tom Johnston | 1,430 | 23.1 | 1 | 3 |
| Independent | Anne MacDonald | 331 | 5.4 | | |
| Liberal Democrats | Carol Boyle | 292 | 4.7 | | |
| Scottish Socialist | Barbara Harvey | 165 | 2.7 | | |
| Conservative | Robert Paterson | 160 | 2.6 | | |
| Independent | Robert Kelso | 109 | 1.8 | | |

North Lanarkshire council election, 2007: Strathkelvin
| Party | Candidate | FPv% | % | Seat | Count |
|---|---|---|---|---|---|
| SNP | Frances McGlinchey | 2,055 | 26.4 | 1 | 1 |
| Labour | William Hogg | 1,795 | 23.5 | 1 | 1 |
| Labour | Brian Wallace | 1,309 | 16.9 | 1 | 6 |
| Labour | Joe Shaw | 1,208 | 15.6 | 1 | 4 |
| Conservative | Jonathan Oak | 872 | 11.2 | | |
| Solidarity | Jack Doyle | 409 | 5.4 | | |

North Lanarkshire council election, 2007: Coatbridge North and Glenboig
| Party | Candidate | FPv% | % | Seat | Count |
|---|---|---|---|---|---|
| SNP | John Wilson | 1,983 | 29.4 | 1 | 1 |
| Labour | Tony Clarke | 1,982 | 29.4 | 1 | 3 |
| Labour | Bill Shields | 828 | 12.3 | 1 | 5 |
| Conservative | Alexander Thornton | 714 | 10.6 | | |
| Independent | Martin McWilliams | 604 | 9.0 | 1 | 7 |
| Labour | Gerry Somers | 416 | 6.2 | | |
| Scottish Socialist | John Moffat | 219 | 3.3 | | |

North Lanarkshire council election, 2007: Airdrie North
| Party | Candidate | FPv% | % | Seat | Count |
|---|---|---|---|---|---|
| SNP | Sophia Coyle | 1,745 | 26.3 | 1 | 1 |
| Labour | Tommy Morgan | 1,176 | 17.7 | 1 | 10 |
| SNP | Campbell Cameron | 1,110 | 16.7 | 1 | 2 |
| Labour | Jim McGuigan | 767 | 11.6 | 1 | 10 |
| Labour | Tony Beekman | 506 | 7.6 | | |
| Conservative | Dave Stewart | 493 | 7.4 | | |
| Independent | Patrick Rolink | 442 | 6.7 | | |
| Liberal Democrats | Particia Maguire | 229 | 3.5 | | |
| Independent | Alan Love | 89 | 1.3 | | |
| Scottish Socialist | Ian Smith | 77 | 1.2 | | |

North Lanarkshire council election, 2007: Airdrie Central
| Party | Candidate | FPv% | % | Seat | Count |
|---|---|---|---|---|---|
| SNP | David Stocks | 1,924 | 35.6 | 1 | 1 |
| Labour | Jim Logue | 1,256 | 23.4 | 1 | 4 |
| Labour | Peter Sullivan | 829 | 15.3 | | |
| Independent | George Devine | 630 | 11.7 | 1 | 7 |
| Independent | Ian McNeil | 351 | 6.5 | | |
| Conservative | Cynthia MacKenzie | 318 | 5.9 | | |
| Scottish Socialist | Audrey McMath | 95 | 1.8 | | |

North Lanarkshire council election, 2007: Coatbridge West
| Party | Candidate | FPv% | % | Seat | Count |
|---|---|---|---|---|---|
| Labour | Tom Magginis | 1,872 | 37.4 | 1 | 1 |
| Labour | Jim Smith | 1,476 | 29.5 | 1 | 1 |
| SNP | Paul Welsh | 1,218 | 24.3 | 1 | 2 |
| Conservative | Mark Oak | 251 | 5.0 | | |
| Scottish Socialist | Charlie McCarthy | 192 | 3.8 | | |

North Lanarkshire council election, 2007: Coatbridge South
| Party | Candidate | FPv% | % | Seat | Count |
|---|---|---|---|---|---|
| Labour | James Brooks | 1,682 | 35.0 | 1 | 1 |
| SNP | Ian Ferrie | 1,503 | 31.3 | 1 | 1 |
| Labour | John Higgins | 1,057 | 22.0 | 1 | 2 |
| Conservative | Robert Hargrave | 392 | 8.2 | | |
| Scottish Socialist | Craig Coats | 172 | 3.6 | | |

North Lanarkshire council election, 2007: Airdrie South
| Party | Candidate | FPv% | % | Seat | Count |
|---|---|---|---|---|---|
| SNP | Michael Coyle | 2,845 | 40.0 | 1 | 1 |
| Labour | Tom Curley | 1,706 | 23.7 | 1 | 1 |
| Labour | David Fagan | 712 | 10.0 | 1 | 5 |
| Conservative | Rhona Thornton | 625 | 8.0 | | |
| Labour | Morag Thomson | 570 | 7.2 | | |
| Liberal Democrats | John Love | 566 | 7.1 | 1 | 7 |
| Scottish Socialist | Fraser Coats | 173 | 2.4 | | |

North Lanarkshire council election, 2007: Fortissat
| Party | Candidate | FPv% | % | Seat | Count |
|---|---|---|---|---|---|
| Labour | Jim Robertson | 1,596 | 28.3 | 1 | 1 |
| Independent | Charles Cefferty | 1,529 | 27.1 | 1 | 1 |
| SNP | Malcolm McMillan | 1,396 | 24.7 | 1 | 2 |
| Labour | Clare Margaret Quigley | 1,125 | 19.9 | | |

North Lanarkshire council election, 2007: Thorniewood
| Party | Candidate | FPv% | % | Seat | Count |
|---|---|---|---|---|---|
| Labour | Jim McCabe | 1,714 | 29.7 | 1 | 1 |
| SNP | Duncan McShannon | 1,369 | 23.8 | 1 | 4 |
| Labour | Bob Burrows | 1,342 | 23.3 | 1 | 2 |
| Labour | Dave Saunders | 878 | 15.2 | | |
| Conservative | David Imrie Paterson | 455 | 7.9 | | |

North Lanarkshire council election, 2007: Bellshill
| Party | Candidate | FPv% | % | Seat | Count |
|---|---|---|---|---|---|
| SNP | Richard Lyle | 1,523 | 30.2 | 1 | 1 |
| Labour | Harry Curran | 1,297 | 25.7 | 1 | 1 |
| Labour | Harry McGuigan | 1,128 | 22.4 | 1 | 6 |
| SNP | Helen Gallett | 447 | 8.9 | | |
| Conservative | George Clark | 366 | 7.3 | | |
| Independent | William Devlin | 147 | 2.9 | | |
| Solidarity | Ray Gunnion | 138 | 2.7 | | |

North Lanarkshire council election, 2007: Mossend and Holytown
| Party | Candidate | FPv% | % | Seat | Count |
|---|---|---|---|---|---|
| Labour | James Coyle | 1,680 | 37.3 | 1 | 1 |
| SNP | Paul Delaney | 1,365 | 30.3 | 1 | 1 |
| Labour | Kevin McKeown | 886 | 19.7 | 1 | 2 |
| Conservative | Elizabeth McLeod | 386 | 8.6 | | |
| Independent | Jim Reddin | 191 | 4.2 | | |

North Lanarkshire council election, 2007: Motherwell West
| Party | Candidate | FPv% | % | Seat | Count |
|---|---|---|---|---|---|
| SNP | Annette Valentine | 1,573 | 30.9 | 1 | 3 |
| Labour | Michael Ross | 1,270 | 24.9 | 1 | 2 |
| Labour | Paul Kelly | 1,237 | 24.3 | 1 | 3 |
| Conservative | Robert Burgess | 812 | 15.9 | | |
| Independent | Gordon Weir | 205 | 4.0 | | |

North Lanarkshire council election, 2007: Motherwell North
| Party | Candidate | FPv% | % | Seat | Count |
|---|---|---|---|---|---|
| Labour | Peter Nolan | 1,532 | 23.4 | 1 | 1 |
| SNP | Gordon Stewart | 1,480 | 22.6 | 1 | 1 |
| Labour | Helen McKenna | 1,234 | 18.9 | 1 | 2 |
| Labour | Annita McAuley | 1,067 | 16.3 | 1 | 7 |
| Liberal Democrats | Stuart Douglas | 465 | 7.1 | | |
| Conservative | Neil Richardson | 383 | 5.9 | | |
| Independent | Tom Kennedy | 379 | 5.8 | | |

North Lanarkshire council election, 2007: Motherwell South East and Ravenscraig
| Party | Candidate | FPv% | % | Seat | Count |
|---|---|---|---|---|---|
| SNP | Alan Valentine | 2,048 | 34.5 | 1 | 1 |
| Labour | Tommy Luny | 1,153 | 19.4 | 1 | 2 |
| Labour | Kaye Harmon | 1,014 | 17.1 | 1 | 5 |
| Labour | Gary O'Rorke | 782 | 13.2 | | |
| Conservative | Linsey McKay | 699 | 11.8 | 1 | 5 |
| Scottish Socialist | Joyce Carmichael | 240 | 4.0 | | |

North Lanarkshire council election, 2007: Murdostoun
| Party | Candidate | FPv% | % | Seat | Count |
|---|---|---|---|---|---|
| Labour | Jimmy Martin | 1,449 | 20.0 | 1 | 1 |
| SNP | John Taggart | 1,322 | 18.2 | 1 | 4 |
| Independent | Robert McKendrick | 1,085 | 15.0 | 1 | 7 |
| Labour | Nicky Shelvin | 804 | 11.1 | 1 | 7 |
| Independent | John Lawrie | 756 | 10.4 | | |
| Labour | David Moon | 654 | 9.0 | | |
| Conservative | Mark Nolan | 614 | 8.5 | | |
| Scottish Christian | Tom Selfridge | 348 | 4.8 | | |
| Solidarity | William Kelly | 212 | 2.9 | | |

North Lanarkshire council election, 2007: Wishaw
| Party | Candidate | FPv% | % | Seat | Count |
|---|---|---|---|---|---|
| SNP | Clare Adamson | 2,232 | 30.6 | 1 | 1 |
| Labour | John Pentland | 1,605 | 22.0 | 1 | 1 |
| Labour | Sam Love | 1,594 | 21.9 | 1 | 1 |
| Labour | Frank McKay | 1,099 | 15.1 | 1 | 5 |
| Conservative | Marjory Borthwick | 761 | 10.4 | | |

== By-Elections since 3 May 2007 ==
- Labour's Francis Griffin died on 10 November 2007. Mark Griffin held the seat for the party in the resulting by-election on 31 January 2008

Kilsyth By-Election (31 January 2008) - 1 seat
| Party | Candidate | FPv% | Count |
| Party | Candidate | FPv% | 1 |
|---|---|---|---|
| Labour | Mark Griffin | 63.4 | 1,855 |
| SNP | Claire Fyvie | 30.4 | 891 |
| Green | Rob Kay | 2.3 | 66 |
| Conservative | Robert Burgess | 1.7 | 50 |
| Scottish Socialist | Willie O'Neill | 1.6 | 48 |
| Liberal Democrats | Stuart Douglas | 0.6 | 17 |
| Turnout | | 2,947 | 32.1% |
| Labour hold | | Swing | |

- The SNP's John Wilson resigned following his election as an MSP. Peter Sullivan gained the seat for Labour in the resulting by-election.

Coatbridge North and Glenboig By-Election (4 June 2009) - 1 seat
| Party | Candidate | FPv% | Count | | | | | |
| Party | Candidate | FPv% | 1 | 2 | 3 | 4 | 5 | 6 |
|---|---|---|---|---|---|---|---|---|
| Labour | Peter Sullivan | 37.2 | 1,529 | 1,542 | 1,558 | 1,577 | 1,615 | 1,759 |
| SNP | Allan Stubbs | 30.5 | 1,254 | 1,276 | 1,307 | 1,357 | 1,446 | 1,696 |
| Independent | Julie McAnulty | 13.5 | 557 | 565 | 604 | 635 | 730 | |
| Conservative | Bob Burgess | 8.8 | 361 | 365 | 372 | 387 | | |
| Independent | Hugh Banford | 5.3 | 217 | 218 | 218 | | | |
| Green | Kristofer Keane | 2.8 | 115 | 126 | | | | |
| Scottish Socialist | Fraser Coats | 2.0 | 81 | | | | | |
| Labour gain from SNP | | Swing | | | | | | |
Electorate: 14,270 Valid: 4,114 Spoilt: 67 Quota: 2,058 Turnout: 4,181 (29.3%)

|}

- Labour Party's Tony Clarke died on 24 August 2011. Michael McPake held the seat in the resulting by-election.

Coatbridge North and Glenboig By-Election (27 October 2011) - 1 seat
| Party | Candidate | FPv% | Count |
| Party | Candidate | FPv% | 1 |
|---|---|---|---|
| Labour | Michael McPake | 52.3 | 1,527 |
| SNP | Julie McAnulty | 39.0 | 1,139 |
| Conservative | Bob Burgess | 6.0 | 174 |
| Liberal Democrats | Graham Dale | 2.7 | 78 |
| Labour hold | | Swing | |
Electorate: 14,590 Valid: 2,919 Spoilt: 15 Quota: 1,460 Turnout: 2,934 (20.11%)

|} |}
