= 2022 North Lanarkshire Council election =

North Lanarkshire Council election

- 5 May 2022

All 77 seats to North Lanarkshire Council 39 seats needed for a majority
- Registered: 264,519
- Turnout: 41.3%
	First party	Second party	Third party
	SNP	Lab	Con
Leader	Jordan Linden	Jim Logue	Sandy Watson
Party	SNP	Labour	Conservative
Leader's seat	Bellshill	Airdrie Central	Airdrie South
Last election	33 seats, 38.4%	32 seats, 32.9%	10 seats, 15.8%
Seats before	26	31	8
Seats won	36	32	5
Seat change	▲3	Steady	▼5
Popular vote	46,255	37,336	12,571
Percentage	43.6%	35.2%	11.8%
Swing	▲5.2%	▲2.3%	▼4.0%
	Fourth party	Fifth party	Sixth party
	Ind	Grn	BUP
Leader		Claire Louise Williams	John Jo Leckie
Party	Independent	Green	BUP
Leader's seat		Stepps, Chryston and Muirhead	Fortissat
Last election	2 seats, 7.4%	0 seats, 1.3%	0 seats, 0.5%
Seats before	9	0	0
Seats won	2	1	1
Seat change	Steady	▲1	▲1
Popular vote	4,282	2,304	859
Percentage	4.0%	2.2%	0.5%
Swing	▼3.4%	▲0.9%	▲0.3%
- Results of the 2022 North Lanarkshire Council Election by ward.
Leader before election
Jim Logue
(Labour)
No overall control
Leader after election
Jordan Linden
(SNP)
No overall control

Elections to North Lanarkshire Council took place on 5 May 2022 on the same day as the 31 other Scottish local government elections. As with other Scottish council elections, it was held using single transferable vote (STV) – a form of proportional representation – in which multiple candidates are elected in each ward and voters rank candidates in order of preference.

For the second consecutive election, the Scottish National Party (SNP) were returned as the largest party with 36 seats – three shy of an overall majority. Despite a slight increase in vote share, Labour made a net gain of zero seats to remain as the second-largest party on 32 seats. The Conservatives lost half of their seats while both the Greens and the British Unionist Party (BUP) won their first seats in a North Lanarkshire election. The remaining two seats were won by independents.

For the first time in the council's history, Labour lost control as their ruling minority administration supported by the Conservatives was replaced by an SNP minority administration. However, following allegations of sexual harassment against council leader Jordan Linden, Labour regained control of the council three months later.

== Background ==
=== Previous election ===
At the previous election in 2017, the Scottish National Party (SNP) were returned as the largest party in an election in North Lanarkshire for the first time after winning 33 seats – an increase of three but still six shy of an overall majority. Labour, who had been in power in North Lanarkshire since the council's creation in 1995, failed to win a majority of seats for the first time as their vote share fell by more than one-third and they lost 12 seats to return 32 councillors. The Conservatives won their first seats in North Lanarkshire for a decade after returning 10 councillors and the remaining two seats were won by independent candidates.

2017 North Lanarkshire Council election result
Party	Seats	Vote share
SNP	33	38.4%
Labour	32	33.0%
Conservatives	10	15.9%
Independent	2	7.5%

=== Electoral system ===
The election used the 21 wards created following the fifth statutory review of electoral arrangements conducted by Local Government Boundary Commission for Scotland in 2016, with 77 councillors elected. Each ward elected either three or four councillors, using the single transferable vote (STV) electoral system – a form of proportional representation – where candidates are ranked in order of preference.

=== Composition ===
Since the previous election, several changes in the composition of the council occurred. Most were changes to the political affiliation of councillors including SNP councillors Paddy Hogg and Tommy Cochrane as well as Labour councillors Angela Feeney, Gillian Fannan, Willie Doolan and Tommy Morgan who resigned from their respective parties to become independents. SNP councillors Lynne Anderson, David Baird and Shahid Farooq defected to the Alba Party.

Conservative councillor Stephen Goldsack was expelled from the party for his previous connections to the British National Party, and SNP councillor Mark Kerr stood down from the party after being charged with sexual abuse in July 2020. Six by-elections were held and resulted in a Labour gain from the Conservatives, two Labour holds, two Labour gains from the SNP and an independent hold.

Composition of North Lanarkshire Council
Party	2017 result	Dissolution
SNP	33	26
Labour	32	31
Conservative	10	8
Independents	2	9
Alba	N/A	3

=== Retiring councillors ===
Retiring councillors
Ward	Party	Retiring councillor
Kilsyth	Independent	Mark Kerr
Cumbernauld North	Conservative	Calum Currie
Cumbernauld South	SNP	Junaid Ashraf
Cumbernauld South	Labour	Allan Graham
Cumbernauld East	Labour	Gillian Fannan
Stepps, Chryston and Muirhead	Alba	Lynne Anderson
Stepps, Chryston and Muirhead	Conservative	Steven Goldsack
Gartcosh, Glenboig and Moodiesburn	Labour	Willie Doolan
Airdrie North	Conservative	David Cullen
Airdrie North	Labour	Tommy Morgan
Airdrie Central	SNP	Nancy Pettigrew
Airdrie Central	SNP	David Stocks
Coatbridge West	SNP	Caroline Stephen
Coatbridge South	Labour	Tom Castles
Thorniewood	Labour	Bob Burrows
Bellshill	Labour	Harry Curran
Motherwell West	Conservative	Meghan Gallacher
Motherwell West	SNP	Annette Valentine
Motherwell North	Labour	Olivia Carson
Motherwell North	Labour	Pat O'Rourke
Motherwell North	SNP	Ann Weir
Motherwell South East and Ravenscraig	SNP	Alan Valentine
Wishaw	Labour	Angela Feeney

=== Candidates ===
The total number of candidates fell from 157 in 2017 to 142 despite an increase in the number of parties contesting the election. The SNP again fielded the largest number of candidates at 43 – one less than in 2017 – while Labour again fielded 42 candidates. The Conservatives were the only other party to contest every ward, naming 21 candidates as they had done in 2017. The Greens named the same number of candidates (seven) as they had at the previous election, contesting 7 of the 21 wards.

The number of independent candidates standing fell from twenty in 2017 to seven. The UK Independence Party (UKIP) (two) and the Scottish Socialist Party (one) again contested the election in North Lanarkshire but stood four and one fewer candidates respectively. The British Unionist Party (BUP) stood one candidate as they had in 2017. For the first time, the Alba Party (six), the Scottish Family Party (five), the Independence for Scotland Party (ISP) (one), the Social Democratic Party (SDP) (one) and the Freedom Alliance (one) fielded candidates in a North Lanarkshire election while the Liberal Democrats (three) contested an election in North Lanarkshire for the first time since 2012. Independent Alliance North Lanarkshire, RISE and Solidarity did not contest the election as they had in 2017.

=== Controversies ===
Scottish Family Party candidates in Lanarkshire were accused of "extremist right wing views" by advocacy group Hope not Hate for their policies on transgender rights and hate speech legislation. The party is considered anti-LGBT but claims to be pro-free speech.

== Results ==
2022 North Lanarkshire Council election result
Party	Seats	Gains	Losses	Net gain/loss	Seats %	Votes %	Votes	+/−
SNP	36	4	1	▲3	46.8	43.6	46,255	▲5.1
Labour	32	2	2	Steady	41.6	35.2	37,336	▲2.2
Conservative	5	0	5	▼5	6.5	11.8	12,571	▼4.1
Independent	2	0	0	Steady	2.6	4.0	4,282	▼3.5
Green	1	1	0	▲1	1.3	2.2	2,304	▲0.9
BUP	1	1	0	▲1	1.3	0.8	859	▲0.3
Alba	0	0	0	Steady	0.0	1.0	1,058	New
Liberal Democrats	0	0	0	Steady	0.0	0.5	478	New
Scottish Family	0	0	0	Steady	0.0	0.4	381	New
SDP	0	0	0	Steady	0.0	0.2	172	New
Scottish Socialist	0	0	0	Steady	0.0	0.1	154	Steady
ISP	0	0	0	Steady	0.0	0.1	129	New
UKIP	0	0	0	Steady	0.0	0.1	65	▼0.3
Freedom Alliance	0	0	0	Steady	0.0	0.0	41	New
Total	77						106,085	

Note: Votes are the sum of first preference votes across all council wards. The net gain/loss and percentage changes relate to the result of the previous Scottish local elections on 4 May 2017. This is because STV has an element of proportionality which is not present unless multiple seats are being elected. This may differ from other published sources showing gain/loss relative to seats held at the dissolution of Scotland's councils.

=== Ward summary ===
2022 Results of the North Lanarkshire Council election by ward
Ward	%	Seats	%	Seats	%	Seats	%	Seats	%	Seats	Total
Ward	SNP		Labour		Conservatives		Green		Others		Total
Kilsyth	37.4	1	52.4	2	6.4	0			3.7	0	3
Cumbernauld North	50.3	2	27.7	1	14.2	1	4.1	0	3.7	0	4
Cumbernauld South	51.8	2	35.5	2	7.9	0			9.1	0	4
Cumbernauld East	58.5	3	23.2	1	8.8	0	4.2	0	5.3	0	4
Stepps, Chryston and Muirhead	36.4	1	34.7	1	15.0	0	10.8	1	3.2	0	3
Gartcosh, Glenboig and Moodiesburn	46.8	2	39.2	1	9.4	0	4.5	0			3
Coatbridge North	46.3	2	33.9	2	9.7	0			10.1	0	4
Airdrie North	36.1	2	29.3	1	10.8	0			23.7	1	4
Airdrie Central	41.6	2	42.2	2	13.7	0			2.5	0	4
Coatbridge West	47.9	2	39.4	1	6.16	0			6.5	0	3
Coatbridge South	53.2	2	34.9	2	6.7	0	2.1	0	3.1	0	4
Airdrie South	47.6	2	35.3	1	17.1	1					4
Fortissat	30.8	1	36.5	2	11.2	0	2.6	0	18.8	1	4
Thorniewood	36.8	1	43.4	2	7.1	0			12.7	0	3
Bellshill	40.8	2	38.8	2	13.6	0			2.2	0	4
Mossend and Holytown	42.6	2	39.4	2	12.8	0			5.2	0	3
Motherwell West	41.1	2	31.9	1	18.9	1	8.1	0			3
Motherwell North	46.6	2	37.3	2	11.0	0			5.0	0	4
Motherwell South East and Ravenscraig	42.8	2	31.2	1	16.7	1	7.8	0			4
Murdostoun	29.7	1	28.7	2	9.1	0			32.5	1	4
Wishaw	45.4	2	36.1	1	18.5	1					4
Total	43.6	36	35.2	32	11.8	5	2.2	1	7.1	3	77

=== Seats changing hands ===
Below is a list of seats which elected a different party or parties from 2017 in order to highlight the change in political composition of the council from the previous election. The list does not include defeated incumbents who resigned or defected from their party and subsequently failed re-election while the party held the seat.

Seats changing hands
Seat	2017		2022	
Seat	Party	Member	Party	Member
Cumbernauld South	SNP	Junaid Ashraf	Labour	Peter McDade
Stepps, Chryston and Muirhead	Conservative	Steven Goldsack	Green	Claire Louise Williams
Gartcosh, Glenboig and Moodiesburn	Labour	Willie Doolan	SNP	Joanne Katy Keltie
Airdrie North	Conservative	David Cullen	SNP	Richard Alan Sullivan
Airdrie Central	Conservative	Trevor Douglas	Labour	Chris Costello
Coatbridge West	Labour	Mary Gourlay	SNP	Gary Robinson
Fortissat	Conservative	Sandy Thornton	BUP	John Jo Leckie
Bellshill	Conservative	Colin Cameron	SNP	Lisa Stubbs

Notes

1. Note 1: Although elected in 2017, Sandy Thornton never took office after refusing to sign the necessary paperwork.

== Ward results ==
=== Kilsyth ===
Labour (2) and the SNP (1) held the seats they won at the last election.

Kilsyth – 3 seats
Party	Candidate	FPv%	Count
Party	Candidate	FPv%	1
SNP	Denis Johnston	27.2	1,187
Labour	Heather Brannan-McVey (incumbent)	26.9	1,176
Labour	Jean Jones (incumbent)	25.5	1,113
SNP	Lindsay Sievewright	10.2	447
Conservative	James King	6.5	282
Scottish Family	John Hendry	2.0	87
Liberal Democrats	Melissa Laima Juliet Kane	1.7	73
Electorate: 9,937 Valid: 4,365 Spoilt: 142 Quota: 1,092 Turnout: 45.4%

=== Cumbernauld North ===
The SNP (2), Labour (1) and the Conservatives (1) held the seats they won at the last election.

Cumbernauld North – 4 seats
Party	Candidate	FPv%	Count							
Party	Candidate	FPv%	1	2	3	4	5	6	7	8
SNP	Alan Masterton (incumbent)	30.5	2,157							
Labour	Tom Fisher (incumbent)	20.2	1,428							
SNP	Danish Ashraf (incumbent)	19.7	1,399	1,996						
Conservative	Gordon Currie	14.2	1,003	1,011	1,020	1,021	1,035	1,084	1,117	1,425
Labour	Donna Kiddie	7.5	534	556	635	646	664	719	936	
Green	Anne McCrossan	4.1	290	349	586	586	604	659		
Liberal Democrats	John Cole	2.5	180	189	218	219	225			
Scottish Family	John Patrick McGrory	1.2	84	90	101	101				
Electorate: 15,417 Valid: 7,075 Spoilt: 164 Quota: 1,416 Turnout: 47.0%

=== Cumbernauld South ===
The SNP retained two of the three seats they had won at the previous election while Labour retained their only seat and gained one from the SNP.

Cumbernauld South – 4 seats
Party	Candidate	FPv%	Count							
Party	Candidate	FPv%	1	2	3	4	5	6	7	8
Labour	James McPhilemy	24.1	1,374							
SNP	Ann Ballinger	19.1	1,089	1,092	1,092	1,096	1,123	1,127	1,128	1,683
SNP	William Goldie (incumbent)	16.8	959	963	964	966	995	1,005	1,006	1,361
SNP	Catherine Johnston (incumbent)	15.9	910	914	916	921	944	956	957	
Labour	Peter McDade	11.5	656	857	862	882	923	1,154		
Conservative	Rebecca MacPhee	7.9	453	457	460	481	497			
Scottish Socialist	Willie Homer	2.7	154	156	165	177				
Scottish Family	Norma McLachlan Diffin	1.3	77	78	92					
Freedom Alliance (UK)	Simona Panaitescu	0.7	41	42						
Electorate: 12,788 Valid: 5,713 Spoilt: 163 Quota: 1,143 Turnout: 45.9%

=== Cumbernauld East ===
The SNP (3) and Labour (1) retained the seats they had won at the previous election.

Cumbernauld East – 4 seats
Party	Candidate	FPv%	Count						
Party	Candidate	FPv%	1	2	3	4	5	6	7
SNP	Claire Barclay (incumbent)	31.8	1,704						
Labour	Barry McCulloch	19.1	1,022	1,036	1,045	1,217			
SNP	Tom Johnston (incumbent)	18.1	970	1,388					
Conservative	David MacPhee	8.8	469	471	473	479	503	522	592
SNP	Adam Smith	8.6	460	572	839	846	860	1,000	1,090
Independent	Paddy Hogg (incumbent)	5.3	283	300	304	313	340	384	
Green	Kyle Davidson	4.2	225	266	278	290	307		
Labour	Susan Taylor	4.1	222	228	232				
Electorate: 13,027 Valid: 5,355 Spoilt: 209 Quota: 1,072 Turnout: 42.7%

=== Stepps, Chryston and Muirhead ===
The SNP and Labour retained the seats they had won at the previous election while the Conservatives lost their seat to the Greens.

Stepps, Chryston and Muirhead – 3 seats
Party	Candidate	FPv%	Count						
Party	Candidate	FPv%	1	2	3	4	5	6	7
SNP	Josh Cairns	26.8	1,299						
Labour	John McLaren (incumbent)	23.9	1,159	1,162	1,204	1,272			
Conservative	Crissy Sandhu	15.0	725	725	757	766	772	870	
Green	Claire Louise Williams	10.8	523	529	557	856	859	1,044	1,218
Labour	Margaret-Anne Shaw	10.7	521	523	549	603	646		
SNP	Ian MacQuarrie	9.6	467	539	548				
Liberal Democrats	Neil K. Casey	3.2	154	155					
Electorate: 10,567 Valid: 4,848 Spoilt: 111 Quota: 1,213 Turnout: 46.9%

=== Gartcosh, Glenboig and Moodiesburn ===
Labour retained one of their two seats while the SNP held their seat and gained one seat from Labour.

Gartcosh, Glenboig and Moodiesburn – 3 seats
Party	Candidate	FPv%	Count				
Party	Candidate	FPv%	1	2	3	4	5
SNP	Greg Lennon (incumbent)	30.5	1,365				
Labour	Michael McPake (incumbent)	20.8	929	940	973	1,111	1,881
Labour	Joseph Beekman	18.4	826	832	860	967	
SNP	Joanne Katy Keltie	16.3	728	925	1,038	1,059	1,134
Conservative	Norma Raeside	9.4	421	424	437		
Green	Patrick Pearse McAleer	4.5	203	219			
Electorate: 10,698 Valid: 4,472 Spoilt: 80 Quota: 1,119 Turnout: 42.6%

=== Coatbridge North ===
The SNP (2) and Labour (2) retained the seats they had won at the previous election.

Coatbridge North – 4 seats
Party	Candidate	FPv%	Count								
Party	Candidate	FPv%	1	2	3	4	5	6	7	8	9
SNP	Kirsten Larson (incumbent)	31.2	1,545								
Labour	Alexander McVey (incumbent)	20.5	1,017								
SNP	Allan Stubbs (incumbent)	15.1	749	1,197							
Labour	Bill Shields (incumbent)	13.4	663	691	726	747	762	785	832	992	1,188
Conservative	Craig Whiteside	9.7	479	482	484	484	490	497	546	562	
SDP	Jeff McDonald	3.5	172	179	183	183	192	202			
ISP	Julie Patricia McNulty	2.6	129	147	180	181	208	271	286		
Alba	Mark Shields	2.5	123	136	163	163	169				
Scottish Family	Leo Francis Lanahan	1.6	79	85	90	91					
Electorate: 12,021 Valid: 4,956 Spoilt: 148 Quota: 992 Turnout: 42.5%

=== Airdrie North ===
The SNP, Labour and independent candidate Alan Beveridge retained the seats they had won at the previous election while the SNP gained one seat from the Conservatives.

Airdrie North – 4 seats
Party	Candidate	FPv%	Count							
Party	Candidate	FPv%	1	2	3	4	5	6	7	8
SNP	Sophia Coyle (incumbent)	31.3	1,741							
Independent	Alan Beveridge (incumbent)	22.0	1,223							
Labour	Henry Emerson Dunbar	21.0	1,170							
Conservative	Graeme McGinnigle	10.8	603	605	622	628	638	658	756	
Labour	Peter Gerard Kelly (Note: Sitting councillor for Fortissat.)	8.3	463	491	517	557	561	586		
SNP	Richard Alan Sullivan	4.8	269	802	826	827	827	838	942	1,025
Liberal Democrats	Robert Stewart McGeorge	1.3	71	77	85	86	94			
UKIP	Daryl Gardner	0.4	25	28	31	32				
Electorate: 15,029 Valid: 5,565 Spoilt: 122 Quota: 1,114 Turnout: 37.8%

=== Airdrie Central ===
The SNP (2) and Labour (1) retained the seats they had won at the previous election while Labour gained one seat from the Conservatives.

Airdrie Central – 4 seats
Party	Candidate	FPv%	Count	
Party	Candidate	FPv%	1	2
SNP	Lesley Jarvie	31.4	1,468	
Labour	Chris Costello	21.1	988	
Labour	Jim Logue (incumbent)	21.1	986	
Conservative	Trevor Douglas (incumbent)	13.7	642	646
SNP	Janice Catherine Toner	10.2	478	951
Alba	Julie Marshall	2.5	117	133
Electorate: 12,690 Valid: 4,679 Spoilt: 129 Quota: 936 Turnout: 37.9%

=== Coatbridge West ===
Labour retained one of the two seats they had won at the previous election while the SNP retained their seat and gained one seat from Labour.

Coatbridge West – 3 seats
Party	Candidate	FPv%	Count				
Party	Candidate	FPv%	1	2	3	4	5
SNP	Lesley Mitchell	32.2	1,254				
Labour	Kevin Docherty (incumbent)	29.8	1,159				
SNP	Gary Robinson	15.7	613	869	876	885	1,038
Labour	Mary Gourlay (incumbent)	9.6	374	380	530	649	709
Alba	Robert Slavin	6.5	254	262	268	289	
Conservative	Laraine Shields	6.2	240	240	244		
Electorate: 10,411 Valid: 3,894 Spoilt: 159 Quota: 974 Turnout: 38.9%

=== Coatbridge South ===
The SNP (2) and Labour (2) retained the seats they had won at the previous election.

Coatbridge South – 4 seats
Party	Candidate	FPv%	Count					
Party	Candidate	FPv%	1	2	3	4	5	6
SNP	Tracy Carragher (incumbent)	28.5	1,384					
SNP	Fergus MacGregor (incumbent)	24.6	1,195					
Labour	Andrew Bustard	22.7	1,100					
Labour	Geraldine Woods (incumbent)	12.2	593	676	719	814	866	981
Conservative	Peter Murray	6.7	327	333	335	344	374	398
Independent	Tony Grimason	3.1	149	180	203	207		
Green	Graham James Kerr	2.1	101	228	292	297	351	
Electorate: 13,164 Valid: 4,849 Spoilt: 209 Quota: 970 Turnout: 38.4%

=== Airdrie South ===
The SNP (2), Labour (1) and the Conservatives (1) retained the seats they had won at the previous election.

Airdrie South – 4 seats
Party	Candidate	FPv%	Count				
Party	Candidate	FPv%	1	2	3	4	5
SNP	Michael Joseph Coyle (incumbent)	30.7	1,847				
Labour	Michael McBride	23.0	1,386				
Conservative	Sandy Watson (incumbent)	17.1	1,028	1,038	1,055	1,061	1,592
SNP	Paul Di Mascio (incumbent)	16.9	1,015	1,581			
Labour	Ian McNeil (incumbent)	12.3	739	756	891	1,054	
Electorate: 15,018 Valid: 6,015 Spoilt: 193 Quota: 1,204 Turnout: 41.3%

=== Fortissat ===
Labour (2) and the SNP (1) retained the seats they had won at the previous election while the BUP gained a seat from the Conservatives.

Fortissat – 4 seats
Party	Candidate	FPv%	Count					
Party	Candidate	FPv%	1	2	3	4	5	6
Labour	Martin McCulloch (incumbent)	22.5	1,028					
SNP	Margaret Hughes	20.8	949					
BUP	John Jo Leckie	18.8	859	864	864	870	1,136	
Labour	Kenneth Stevenson (incumbent)	14.0	636	729	730	753	867	957
Conservative	Ben Callaghan	11.2	512	514	515	523		
SNP	Sarah Quinn	10.0	457	463	494	547	561	571
Green	Emma Rachel Cuthbertson	2.6	118	119	121			
Electorate: 12,104 Valid: 4,559 Spoilt: 123 Quota: 912 Turnout: 38.7%

=== Thorniewood ===
Labour (2) and the SNP (1) retained the seats they had won at the previous election.

Thorniewood – 3 seats
Party	Candidate	FPv%	Count				
Party	Candidate	FPv%	1	2	3	4	5
SNP	Barry McCluskey	36.8	1,642				
Labour	Helen Loughran (incumbent)	26.4	1,180				
Labour	Margaret Boyd	17.0	760	903	950	1,083	1,458
Independent	Joseph Budd	12.7	568	768	773	854	
Conservative	Jeanie Burgess	7.1	318	327	330		
Electorate: 10,896 Valid: 4,468 Spoilt: 81 Quota: 1,118 Turnout: 41.7%

=== Bellshill ===
Labour (2) and the SNP (1) retained the seats they had won at the previous election while the SNP also gained one seat from the Conservatives.

Bellshill – 4 seats
Party	Candidate	FPv%	Count				
Party	Candidate	FPv%	1	2	3	4	5
SNP	Jordan Linden (incumbent)	28.1	1,300				
Labour	Angela Campbell (incumbent)	25.1	1,162				
Labour	Pat Patton	13.7	635	657	829	845	935
Conservative	Colin Cameron (incumbent)	13.6	632	635	653	663	689
SNP	Lisa Stubbs	12.7	589	888	893	919	978
Independent	John Devlin	4.5	209	220	232	264	
Alba	David Baird (Note: Sitting councillor for Mossend and Holytown.)	2.2	104	109	110		
Electorate: 12,279 Valid: 4,631 Spoilt: 153 Quota: 927 Turnout: 39.0%

=== Mossend and Holytown ===
Labour (2) and the SNP (1) retained the seats they had won at the previous election.

Mossend and Holytown – 3 seats
Party	Candidate	FPv%	Count					
Party	Candidate	FPv%	1	2	3	4	5	6
Labour	Frank McNally (incumbent)	29.8	1,132					
SNP	Beth Baudo	25.7	974					
SNP	Michael Clarkson	16.9	642	650	672	763	782	
Conservative	Sheila Cameron	12.8	486	496	497	512		
Labour	Jim Reddin (incumbent)	9.6	364	512	512	544	818	1,095
Alba	John Marshall	5.2	198	199	200			
Electorate: 10,343 Valid: 3,796 Spoilt: 152 Quota: 950 Turnout: 38.2%

=== Motherwell West ===
The SNP, Labour and the Conservatives retained the seats they had won at the previous election.

Motherwell West – 3 seats
Party	Candidate	FPv%	Count					
Party	Candidate	FPv%	1	2	3	4	5	6
SNP	David Crichton	27.4	1,261					
Labour	Paul Kelly (incumbent)	24.0	1,105	1,109	1,364			
Conservative	Lorraine Nolan	18.9	869	869	896	943	1,003	1,271
SNP	Lindsay Evans	13.6	626	722	737	767	1,001	
Green	Gordon Thomas Miller	8.1	372	378	401	445		
Labour	Megan McCann	7.9	363	364				
Electorate: 11,093 Valid: 4,596 Spoilt: 168 Quota: 1,150 Turnout: 42.9%

=== Motherwell North ===
The SNP (2) and Labour (2) retained the seats they had won at the previous election.

Motherwell North – 4 seats
Party	Candidate	FPv%	Count				
Party	Candidate	FPv%	1	2	3	4	5
SNP	Gerry Brennan	31.6	1,646				
Labour	Andrew Duffy-Lawson	27.4	1,427				
SNP	Anne Thomas	15.0	780	1,282			
Conservative	Oyebola Ajala	11.0	574	576	600	606	
Labour	Ayeshah Khan	9.9	513	541	840	913	1,048
Alba	Shahid Farooq (incumbent)	5.0	262	288	294		
Electorate: 13,654 Valid: 5,202 Spoilt: 179 Quota: 1,041 Turnout: 39.4%

=== Motherwell South East and Ravenscraig ===
The SNP (2), Labour (1) and the Conservatives (1) retained the seats they had won at the previous election.

Motherwell South East and Ravenscraig – 4 seats
Party	Candidate	FPv%	Count							
Party	Candidate	FPv%	1	2	3	4	5	6	7	8
SNP	Agnes Magowan (incumbent)	32.0	1,941							
Labour	Kenneth Duffy (incumbent)	22.6	1,368							
Conservative	Nathan Wilson (incumbent)	16.7	1,010	1,025	1,032	1,033	1,039	1,048	1,090	1,316
SNP	David Robb	10.8	653	1,263						
Labour	Michael Ross	8.7	525	543	657	665	672	688	874	
Green	Derek Watson	7.8	472	514	522	542	551	563		
Scottish Family	James Joseph Mitchell	0.9	54	62	66	67	70			
UKIP	Neil Wilson	0.7	40	40	40	40				
Electorate: 15,549 Valid: 6,063 Spoilt: 190 Quota: 1,213 Turnout: 40.2%

=== Murdostoun ===
Labour (2), the SNP (1) and independent candidate Robert John McKendrick retained the seats they had won at the previous election.

Murdostoun – 4 seats
Party	Candidate	FPv%	Count						
Party	Candidate	FPv%	1	2	3	4	5	6	7
Independent	Robert John McKendrick (incumbent)	27.2	1,545						
SNP	Cameron McManus (incumbent)	19.4	1,106	1,167					
Labour	Louise Roarty (incumbent)	15.0	853	914	916	986	1,191		
Labour	Nicky Shevlin (incumbent)	13.7	778	834	836	892	1,007	1,049	1,317
SNP	Julia Stachurska	10.3	584	606	629	691	705	708	
Conservative	Linsey McKay	9.1	518	545	545	624			
Independent	Robert Livingston Arthur	5.4	305	394	394				
Electorate: 14,403 Valid: 5,689 Spoilt: 136 Quota: 1,138 Turnout: 40.4%

=== Wishaw ===
The SNP (2), Labour (1) and the Conservatives (1) retained the seats they had won at the previous election.

Wishaw – 4 seats
Party	Candidate	FPv%	Count				
Party	Candidate	FPv%	1	2	3	4	5
SNP	Fiona Fotheringham (incumbent)	31.9	1,687				
Labour	Frank McKay	21.5	1,138				
Conservative	Bob Burgess (incumbent)	18.5	980	988	1,000	1,004	1,383
Labour	Martine Nolan	14.6	771	794	881	946	
SNP	Jim Hume (incumbent)	13.6	719	1,286			
Electorate: 13,431 Valid: 5,295 Spoilt: 186 Quota: 1,060 Turnout: 40.8%

== Aftermath ==
Despite falling three seats shy of a majority, the SNP took control of North Lanarkshire for the first time from Labour who had been in power since the council's creation. The minority administration was headed by Bellshill councillor Jordan Linden who was elected as council leader at a "historic" meeting on 19 May 2022. Cllr Tracy Carragher was selected as depute leader while Cllr Agnes Magowan and Cllr Anne Thomas became Provost and depute Provost respectively.

The election saw the Greens pick up their first ever seat in North Lanarkshire after Claire Williams was elected in Stepps, Chryston and Muirhead. It also resulted in the BUP picking up their first elected representative as they gained a seat from the Conservatives in Fortissat – a result which was described by reporter Hamish Morrison in The National as a "devastating upset" for the Conservatives.

Two months after the election, council leader Jordan Linden faced allegations of sexual misconduct stemming from a party in Dundee in 2019. Following pressure from opposition groups, he apologised for the incident and resigned as council leader on 27 July 2022. He later resigned as a councillor in March 2023 following further allegations of sexual harassment which he denied.

On 1 August 2022, Cllr Tracy Carragher was voted to replace Cllr Linden as the leader of the SNP group with Cllr Alan Masterton as her depute. However, the SNP subsequently lost control of the council on 11 August when Cllr Carragher failed to be voted in as the new council leader. Instead, a Labour motion to restore former council leader Jim Logue and depute leader Paul Kelly to their former posts was passed by 38 votes to 37. The decisive vote came from long-time SNP councillor Michael Coyle, who left the party shortly before the meeting. Cllr Coyle's daughter Sophia, councillor for Airdrie North, also resigned from the SNP group citing "infighting and bullying" to sit as an independent. The new Labour administration also nominated a new Provost, Cllr Kenny Duffy, and depute Provost – Conservative councillor Bob Burgess. Both were narrowly elected to the posts resulting in the first time a Conservative had held the role.

Following accusations of a "beyond toxic" environment within the SNP group, Cllr Paul Di Mascio and Cllr David Crichton were expelled from the group on 2 May 2023 for "bringing the group and party into disrepute". The following day, five further SNP councillors – Beth Baudo, Gerry Brennan, Greg Lennon, Barry McCluskey and Cameron McManus – resigned from the SNP group in solidarity with the expelled councillors. Later in the month, Cllr Jim Hume also resigned from the SNP group and the eight councillors formed a new party called Progressive Change North Lanarkshire. In January 2024, Cllr Baudo defected to Labour.

In March 2024, Labour councillor for Bellshill Angela Campbell became an independent.

Cllr Andrew Duffy-Lawson, Labour councillor for Motherwell North, was suspended from the party in July 2025 following allegations that he had sent sexually inappropriate messages.

Cllr Carragher was suspended by the SNP over her handling of complaints made in relation to the Jordan Linden scandal in April 2026.

=== Bellshill by-election ===
On 14 March 2023, former council leader Jordan Linden resigned following allegations of sexual harassment. A by-election held on 15 June was won by Labour's Anne McCrory.

Bellshill (15 June 2023) – 1 seat
Party	Candidate	FPv%	Count
Party	Candidate	FPv%	1
Labour	Anne McCrory	51.8	1,440
SNP	Joseph Budd	27.1	753
Conservative	Colin Cameron	8.5	236
BUP	Billy Ross	4.3	120
Alba	John Marshall	3.9	107
Green	Rosemary McGowan	1.6	44
Liberal Democrats	John Arthur Henry Cole	1.2	34
Scottish Family	Leo Francis Lanahan	1.1	30
Freedom Alliance (UK)	Simona Panaitescu	0.3	7
UKIP	Neil Wilson	0.3	7
Electorate: 12,410 Valid: 2,778 Spoilt: 41 Quota: 1,390 Turnout: 22.7%

=== Motherwell South East and Ravenscraig by-election ===
In August 2023, SNP councillor Agnes MacGowan resigned for personal reasons. A by-election, held on 16 November 2023, was won by Labour's Kaye Harmon.

Motherwell South East and Ravenscraig (16 November 2023) – 1 seat
Party	Candidate	FPv%	Count						
Party	Candidate	FPv%	1	2	3	4	5	6	7
Labour	Kaye Harmon	44.0	1,368	1,369	1,379	1,398	1,427	1,479	1,642
SNP	Rosa Zambonini	30.1	934	936	964	974	976	1,087	1,103
Conservative	Oyebola Ajala	9.5	296	299	300	305	345	357	
Green	Derek Watson	8.2	255	257	258	266	269		
BUP	Billy Acheson	3.1	96	101	102	107			
Liberal Democrats	Robert Stewart McGeorge	2.2	68	68	73				
Alba	Mark Shields	2.1	66	66					
UKIP	Neil Wilson	0.8	24						
Electorate: 15,794 Valid: 3,107 Spoilt: 48 Quota: 1,554 Turnout: 20.0%

=== Fortissat & Mossend and Holytown by-elections ===
Following their successful campaigns during the 2024 United Kingdom general election, Fortissat councillor Kenneth Stevenson and Mossend and Holytown councillor Frank McNally - who were elected as MP for Airdrie and Shotts and Coatbridge and Bellshill respectively - announced that they had resigned their council seats in August 2024. Both by-elections took place on 10 October 2024 and both seats were held by Labour as Clare Quigley and Helena Gray were elected in Fortissat and Mossend and Holytown respectively.

Fortissat (10 October 2024) – 1 seat
Party	Candidate	FPv%	Count					
Party	Candidate	FPv%	1	2	3	4	5	6
Labour	Clare Quigley	36.6	807	818	834	892	1,007	1,292
Progressive Change North Lanarkshire	Mary McIntosh	24.0	529	542	556	634	757	
SNP	Brendan McAleese	20.3	447	452	457	466		
BUP	Billy Acheson	10.9	241	245	297			
Conservative	Sheila Cameron	5.6	124	131				
Liberal Democrats	Leigh Butler	2.6	57					
Electorate: 12,422 Valid: 2,205 Spoilt: 22 Quota: 1,103 Turnout: 17.9%

Mossend and Holytown (10 October 2024) – 1 seat
Party	Candidate	FPv%	Count					
Party	Candidate	FPv%	1	2	3	4	5	6
Labour	Helena Gray	36.5	616	616	640	668	722	926
SNP	Shahnawaz Khan	34.8	586	586	593	600	633	
Reform	Duncan McMillan	15.5	263	268	276	321		
Conservative	Aimee Alexander	7.5	127	127	141			
Liberal Democrats	John Cole	5.0	83	84				
UKIP	Neil Wilson	0.6	11					
Electorate: 10,813 Valid: 1,686 Spoilt: 27 Quota: 844 Turnout: 15.8%
