= Airdrie North (ward) =

Electoral ward in North Lanarkshire, Scotland

Location of the ward

Airdrie North is one of the twenty-one wards used to elect members of North Lanarkshire Council. It elects four councillors and covers northern and eastern parts of Airdrie (Clarkston, Drumgelloch, Holehills and Thrashbush neighbourhoods) plus the outlying villages of Caldercruix, Wattston, Plains and Glenmavis. Established in 2007, a boundary review in 2017 resulted in a very minor change (the loss of a few streets in Burnfoot). In 2019, the ward's population was 20,137.

== Councillors ==
Election	Councillors			
2007	Sophia Coyle (SNP)	Campbell Cameron (SNP)	Tommy Morgan (Labour)	Jim McGuigan (Labour)
2012	Sophia Coyle (SNP)	Alan Beveridge (SNP/ Ind.)	Tommy Morgan (Labour)	Andrew Spowart (Labour)
2017	Sophia Coyle (SNP)	Alan Beveridge (SNP/ Ind.)	Tommy Morgan (Labour)	David Cullen (Conservative)
2022	Sophia Coyle (SNP)	Alan Beveridge (SNP/ Ind.)	Henry Emerson Dunbar (Labour)	Richard Alan Sullivan (SNP)

== Election results ==
=== 2022 election ===
Airdrie North – 4 seats
Party	Candidate	FPv%	Count							
Party	Candidate	FPv%	1	2	3	4	5	6	7	8
SNP	Sophia Coyle (incumbent)	31.3	1,741							
Independent	Alan Beveridge (incumbent)	22.0	1,223							
Labour	Henry Emerson Dunbar	21.0	1,170							
Conservative	Graeme McGinnigle	10.8	603	605	622	628	638	658	756	
Labour	Peter Gerard Kelly (Note: Sitting councillor for Fortissat.)	8.3	463	491	517	557	561	586		
SNP	Richard Alan Sullivan	4.8	269	802	826	827	827	838	942	1,025
Liberal Democrats	Robert Stewart McGeorge	1.3	71	77	85	86	94			
UKIP	Daryl Gardner	0.4	25	28	31	32				
Electorate: 15,029 Valid: 5,565 Spoilt: 122 Quota: 1,114 Turnout: 37.8%

=== 2017 election ===
Airdrie North - 4 seats
Party	Candidate	FPv%	Count							
Party	Candidate	FPv%	1	2	3	4	5	6	7	8
SNP	Sophia Coyle (incumbent)	22.11	1,320							
Labour	Tommy Morgan (incumbent)	19.17	1,144	1,151	1,155	1,170	1,238			
Independent	Alan Beveridge (incumbent)	18.25	1,084	1,090	1,101	1,121	1,276			
Conservative	David Cullen	18.25	1,084	1,086	1,105	1,117	1,133	1,156	1,159	1,446
Labour	Andrew Spowart (incumbent)	13.44	798	802	807	815	860	886	918	
SNP	Andy Pettigrew	5.99	356	453	464	501				
Green	Kyle Davidson	1.52	90	97	100					
UKIP	Daryl Gardner	1.06	63	64						
Electorate: 14,789 Valid: 5,939 Spoilt: 154 Quota: 1,188 Turnout: 6,093 (41.2%)

=== 2012 election ===
Airdrie North - 4 seats
Party	Candidate	FPv%	Count					
Party	Candidate	FPv%	1	2	3	4	5	6
Labour	Tommy Morgan (incumbent)	30.0%	1,552					
SNP	Alan Beveridge	20.3%	1,050					
SNP	Sophia Coyle (incumbent)	20.1%	1,040					
Labour	Andrew Spowart	10.6%	547	954.3	954.9	955.2	1,005.5	1,072.3
SNP	Patrick Rolink	7.3%	379	402.9	412.7	415.6	432.7	
Independent	Campbell Cameron (incumbent)	6.0%	312	326.6	327.8	328	459.2	493.4
Conservative	Ashley Baird	5.7%	297	304.6	305	305.2		
Electorate: 14,755 Valid: 5,177 Spoilt: 117 Quota: 1,036 Turnout: 5,294 (35.88%)

- SNP councillor Alan Beveridge resigned from the party and became Independent on 10 February 2015 in opposition to the party's 2015 Westminster Election selection procedures.

=== 2007 election ===
2007 North Lanarkshire council election: Airdrie North
Party	Candidate	FPv%	%	Seat	Count
SNP	Sophia Coyle	1,745	26.3	1	1
Labour	Tommy Morgan	1,176	17.7	1	10
SNP	Campbell Cameron	1,110	16.7	1	2
Labour	Jim McGuigan	767	11.6	1	10
Labour	Tony Beekman	506	7.6		
Conservative	Dave Stewart	493	7.4		
Independent	Patrick Rolink	442	6.7		
Liberal Democrats	Particia Maguire	229	3.5		
Independent	Alan Love	89	1.3		
Scottish Socialist	Ian Smith	77	1.2		
