= John Wilson (Scottish Green politician) =

Scottish politician (born 1956)

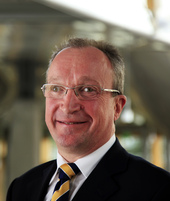
- Wilson in 2012

Deputy Convener of the Local Government and Regeneration Committee
- In office 8 June 2011 – 24 March 2016
- Convener: Kevin Stewart
- Preceded by: Rob Gibson
- Succeeded by: Elaine Smith

Member of the Scottish Parliament for Central Scotland (1 of 7 Regional MSPs)
- In office 3 May 2007 – 24 March 2016

North Lanarkshire Councillor
- In office 4 May 2007 – 4 June 2009
- Constituency: Coatbridge North and Glenboig

Personal details
- Born: John Gordon Wilson; 28 November 1956 (age 69) Falkirk, Scotland
- Other political affiliations: Action for Independence (2021); Scottish Greens (2014–16); Independent (September–December 2014); Scottish National Party (until 2014)

John Gordon Wilson (born 28 November 1956) is a Scottish politician. He was formerly a Member of the Scottish Parliament (MSP) for the Central Scotland region from 2007 until 2016. He sat as a Scottish National Party (SNP) member and then as an independent after 2014. He stood unsuccessfully as a Green Party candidate in the Coatbridge and Chryston constituency at the 2016 Scottish Parliament election and then as an independent candidate in the 2017 Scottish local elections.

== Education and early career ==
Wilson was educated at Camelon High School in Falkirk, then at Coatbridge College and Glasgow University. He has an MA in Politics and Economic History. He was a director of the Scottish Low Pay Unit from 2001 until 2007.

== Political career ==
Wilson joined the SNP in 1999. As a member of the SNP, he was elected to the Scottish Parliament to represent Central Scotland at the 2007 election. The following day the results of local election held on the same day were returned- he had also been elected as a Councillor for the Coatbridge North and Glenboig ward of North Lanarkshire Council. He stood down from the council position to focus on his work at Holyrood, and was replaced by Labour's Peter Sullivan in a by-election on 4 June 2009.

He stood as a SNP candidate in the Coatbridge and Chryston constituency at the 2011 election and although he secured 40% of the vote, he came second. He was returned to Parliament by the regional list.

Wilson was a member of the Scottish Parliament's Local Government and Regeneration Committee and of the Public Petitions Committee. He was one of the MSPs who challenged the use of external consultants by both the Climategate review and latterly the Skills Development Scotland (SDS) quango. He was Deputy Convener of the Economy, Energy and Tourism Committee until September 2012 when he became Deputy Convener of the Local Government and Regeneration Committee.

Wilson opposed the change in SNP policy to support an independent Scotland becoming a member of NATO. He became an independent MSP in September 2014 after the 2014 Scottish independence referendum.

In December 2014, Wilson announced he had joined the Scottish Greens, but would remain in Parliament sitting as an independent member. In March 2015, the Greens balloted their members to select candidates for the 2016 election, with Wilson placed second on their regional list for Central Scotland. In October 2015 it was announced that he would contest the constituency of Coatbridge and Chryston.

He stood for the newly created Gartcosh, Glenboig and Moodiesburn ward in the 2017 Scottish local elections as an independent candidate, but again was unsuccessful.

On 25 March 2021, it was announced that Wilson would be a candidate for Action for Independence at the 2021 Scottish Parliament election. The next day, however, following former First Minister of Scotland, Alex Salmond's announcement that had joined the Alba Party and his intention to stand for election, the AFI's National Executive announced that they would be standing down all 42 candidates and would support Alba candidates instead.
