= Mark Griffin (politician) =

Scottish Labour politician

Mark Griffin MSP
- Official portrait, 2026

Member of the Scottish Parliament for Central Scotland and Lothians West (1 of 7 Regional MSPs)
- Incumbent
- Assumed office 7 May 2026

Member of the Scottish Parliament for Central Scotland (1 of 7 Regional MSPs)
- In office 5 May 2011 – 9 April 2026

Personal details
- Born: 19 October 1985 (age 40) Glasgow, Scotland, UK
- Party: Scottish Labour
- Education: University of Strathclyde (2003–07)

Military service
- Allegiance: United Kingdom
- Branch/service: British Army
- Unit: Territorial Army

Mark Griffin (born 19 October 1985) is a Scottish Labour politician who has served as a Member of the Scottish Parliament (MSP) for the Central Scotland region since 2011.

== Early life and career ==
Raised in Kilsyth, he attended St Patrick's Primary School and then St. Maurice's High School in Cumbernauld, before studying Mechanical Engineering at the University of Strathclyde, where he graduated with a BEng (Hons) degree, in 2007. Griffin is a trained mechanical engineer and prior to his election to North Lanarkshire Council in 2008, he was a serving soldier in the British Territorial Army (TA).

== Political career ==
Having served as a North Lanarkshire Councillor from 2008 until 2012 (serving the multi-member Kilsyth ward), Griffin was elected on the Central Scotland regional list at the 2011 Scottish Parliament election.

In May 2012, Griffin was appointed Scottish Labour Spokesperson for Sport. He held the role until July 2013, when he became Shadow Minister for Transport and Veterans. When Jim Murphy was elected Scottish Labour Party leader in December 2014, Griffin was appointed as Shadow Minister for Learning, Science and Scotland's Languages, covering school education, qualifications, science, HM Inspectorate of Education, the Scottish Qualifications Authority and languages.

Upon his election at the age of 25, Griffin became the youngest Member of the Scottish Parliament since its establishment in 1999. Following the 2016 Scottish Parliament election, this record was taken by 21-year-old Ross Greer, who was elected for the Scottish Green Party.

Griffin became one of the first MSPs elected in 2011 to put forward plans for a Members Bill. Through his work with the Cross Party Group on Deafness, he put the British Sign Language (BSL) (Scotland) Bill through Parliament. The Bill was supported in principle by the Scottish Government in late 2014 and passed into law in September 2015.

In January 2014, Griffin was chosen as the Scottish Labour Party candidate for the Cumbernauld and Kilsyth constituency seat at the 2016 Scottish Parliament election. However, the seat was held by the Scottish National Party's Jamie Hepburn and Griffin was returned again on the Central Scotland regional list.

In September 2020, Griffin quit as Scottish Labour Spokesperson for Social Security and became the fourth MSP to call for Richard Leonard to resign as Scottish Labour leader, saying "Your personal approval ratings are extremely concerning; less than half of the voting public know who you are, a majority of those who do have a negative opinion of your leadership and a majority of Scottish Labour voters have a negative opinion of your leadership. I do not have confidence in your ability, after three years in post, to turn the situation around. I hope you will consider resigning from your position as leader in the best interests of the Scottish Labour Party."

Griffin nominated Anas Sarwar in the 2021 Scottish Labour leadership election. He currently services as Labour's spokesperson for Local Government and Housing in the Scottish Parliament.

Griffin backed the UK Government's decision to introduce means-testing for the Winter Fuel Payment, voting in the Scottish Parliament against calls to reverse the decision.
