= Jordan Linden =

Scottish former politician

Leader of North Lanarkshire Council
- In office 19 May 2022 – 27 July 2022
- Preceded by: Jim Logue
- Succeeded by: Jim Logue

Chair of the Scottish Youth Parliament
- In office 2015–2016
- Preceded by: Louise Cameron
- Succeeded by: Katie Burke

Personal details
- Born: 1995 or 1996 (age 30–31)
- Party: Independent
- Other political affiliations: Scottish National Party (until 2023)
- Relatives: David Linden (cousin)

Jordan Linden (born 1995 or 1996) is a Scottish former politician and convicted sex offender. He was the leader of North Lanarkshire Council from May 2022 until July 2022, when he stepped down after a series of sexual assault allegations.

== Career ==
He served as chair of the Scottish Youth Parliament (SYP) between 2015 and 2016, serving as a MSYP from 2011 to 2016 and served as a councillor for Belshill from May 2017 to March 2023, being elected for the SNP, during which time he worked for Richard Lyle.

While at the SYP, there were a number of internal investigations into sexual harassment allegations. In November 2017, after his first election to council, he briefly "stepped aside" from his SNP membership, while police investigated numerous allegations of sexual harassment from his time at the Scottish Youth Parliament (SYP): Linden said he had been investigated internally and cleared. In April 2018, this police investigation ended with "no criminality established".

By July 2019, he was deputy leader of the SNP group on the council, and became group leader in March 2021.

In 2019, he was nominated for selection as SNP candidate in the 2019 UK general election. During this time, he attended a party following a pride event, after which he was accused of groping a teenager: four days later, apparently after complaints were made to the party, he pulled out of the selection contest.

Linden again was SNP candidate in the 2022 local elections, after which, he became the leader of the council. In July, news of the 2019 elections was published. After this, he resigned as leader of the council. Later that month, five young men came forward claiming to have been groomed harassed or assaulted by Linden, criticising management of SYP for failing to protect them. Following this, the SNP lost control of the council to Labour.

In March 2023, it was reported that, following Linden’s resignation as leader, the council group leadership following discussions with SNP chief executive Peter Murrell urged councillors to support Linden amid negative effects on his mental health. As a result of the handling of this, eight SNP councillors in the North Lanarkshire group quit the party, ultimately sitting together as the "Progressive Change North Lanarkshire" group.

== Sexual assault conviction ==
=== Charges ===
Linden was arrested in February 2024 in regards to various sexual allegations and charged in April 2024. Linden was accused of 15 offences involving 12 males, including sexual assault, sexual communication and stalking.

=== Trial ===
One victim said that Linden had sent him photographs of his genitalia, touched his bottom, attempted to pull down his trousers and "poked and prodded" him in meetings. Another victim and former member of the SYP, said that Linden had "cornered" him in his hotel room. A witness who was later elected as a councillor said that the SNP had "downplayed" complaints related to Linden.

Linden denied all charges.

Former SYP board member Amy Lee Fraioli said that the SYP's chief executive had told the SNP's chief executive Peter Murrell about complaints related to Linden in 2016.

=== Conviction ===
On 26 March 2026, Linden was convicted of five sexual assaults on young men and was also found guilty of sending unsolicited sexual communications to seven teenagers of which the youngest was 14. Sheriff Christopher Shead of the Falkirk Sheriff Court sentenced Linden to 18 months in prison and placed him on the sex offender register. Linden was acquitted of a sixth charge of sexual assault and also of five other charges of stalking and sexual communication.

=== Aftermath ===
First Minister John Swinney apologised to victims of Linden and asked for an independent review of the party's complaints process.

SNP councillor Tracy Carragher was criticised for how she dealt with complaints about Linden. Carragher was suspended from the party, removed as leader of the North Lanarkshire Council's SNP group and removed as a candidate in the 2026 Scottish Parliament election. In August 2026, she was readmitted to the party after an investigation concluded that she had not covered up any complaint related to Linden.

In May 2026, the Office of the Scottish Charity Regulator announced that it had opened an inquiry into the Scottish Youth Parliament. Linden is appealing his sentence.

== Personal life ==
Jordan Linden is the cousin of SNP politician David Linden.

Linden is gay.
