= Bellshill (ward) =

Ward in North Lanarkshire Council, Scotland

Location of the ward

Bellshill is one of the twenty-one wards used to elect members of the North Lanarkshire Council. Created in 2007, it originally returned three councillors, covering part of Bellshill (including the Orbiston, Hattonrigg, Shirrell and West End neighbourhoods but not Milnwood, Thorndean, the town centre east of Hamilton Road / North Road, nor Mossend), with the northern boundary at the A8 and the western boundary at the A725 bypass; much of Strathclyde Country Park (nominally in Motherwell) was also assigned to this ward.

A 2017 national review caused the territory to be altered, with a minor change within central Bellshill moving the eastern boundary to Motherwell Road, and a shift of the western boundary further towards Viewpark to encompass the Fallside neighbourhood (although the majority of built-upon land in this area is the unpopulated Righead Industrial Estate). These changes caused an increase in population, with one additional seat allocated. In 2019, the ward had a population of 14,969.

== Councillors ==
Election	Councillors			
2007	Richard Lyle (SNP)	Harry Curran (Labour)	Harry McGuigan (Labour)	3 seats
2012	Marina Lyle (SNP)	Harry Curran (Labour)	Harry McGuigan (Labour)	3 seats
2017	Jordan Linden (SNP)	Harry Curran (Labour)	Angela Campbell (Labour)	Colin Cameron (Conservative)
2022	Jordan Linden (SNP)	Pat Patton (Labour)	Angela Campbell (Labour)	Lisa Stubbs (SNP)
2023 (by-election)	Anne McCorry (Labour)	Pat Patton (Labour)	Angela Campbell (Labour)	Lisa Stubbs (SNP)

== Election results ==
=== 2023 by-election ===
Bellshill, 15 June 2023
Party	Candidate	FPv%	Count
Party	Candidate	FPv%	1
Labour	Anne McCrory	51.8	1,440
SNP	Joseph Budd	27.1	753
Conservative	Colin Cameron	8.5	236
BUP	Billy Ross	4.3	120
Alba	John Marshall	3.9	107
Green	Rosemary McGowan	1.6	44
Liberal Democrats	John Arthur Henry Cole	1.2	34
Scottish Family	Leo Francis Lanahan	1.1	30
Freedom Alliance (UK)	Simona Panaitescu	0.3	7
UKIP	Neil Wilson	0.3	7
Electorate: 12,410 Valid: 2,778 Spoilt: 41 Quota: 1,390 Turnout: 2,819 (22.7%)

=== 2022 election ===
Bellshill - 4 seats
Party	Candidate	FPv%	Count				
Party	Candidate	FPv%	1	2	3	4	5
SNP	Jordan James Linden (incumbent)	28.1	1,300				
Labour	Angela Campbell (incumbent)	25.1	1,162				
Labour	Pat Patton	13.7	635	657	829	845	935
SNP	Lisa Stubbs	12.7	589	888	893	919	978
Conservative	Colin Cameron (incumbent)	13.6	632	635	653	663	689
Independent	John Devlin	4.5	209	220	232	264	
Alba	David Baird (incumbent in Mossend and Holytown)	2.2	104	109	110		
Electorate: 12,279 Valid: 4,631 Spoilt: 153 Quota: 927 Turnout: 4,784 (39.0%)

=== 2017 election ===
Bellshill - 4 seats
Party	Candidate	FPv%	Count					
Party	Candidate	FPv%	1	2	3	4	5	6
Labour	Harry Curran (incumbent)	25.15	1,237					
SNP	Jordan Linden	21.53	1,059					
Conservative	Colin Cameron	17.69	870	877	877	915	971	1,016
SNP	Marina Lyle (incumbent)	15.09	742	756	823	826	881	
Labour	Angela Campbell	12.36	608	798	800	821	927	1,172
Independent	John Devlin	6.36	313	327	329	343		
UKIP	William Brown	1.81	89	91	92			
Electorate: 12,229 Valid: 4,918 Spoilt: 145 Quota: 984 Turnout: 5,063 (41.4%)

=== 2012 election ===
Bellshill - 3 seats
Party	Candidate	FPv%	Count				
Party	Candidate	FPv%	1	2	3	4	5
Labour	Harry Curran (incumbent)	31.3%	1,208				
Labour	Harry McGuigan (incumbent)	23.8%	919	1,110.5			
SNP	Marina Lyle	17.2%	666	673.6	690.3	708.8	1,106.1
Independent	John Devlin	12.2%	471	483.4	508.2	567.6	588.9
SNP	Owen Gallagher	11.3%	437	444.6	453.6	473.5	
Conservative	Robert Hargrave	4.2%	164	166.6	174.5		
Electorate: 10,888 Valid: 3,865 Spoilt: 94 Quota: 967 Turnout: 3,959 (36.36%)

=== 2007 election ===
2007 North Lanarkshire council election: Bellshill
Party	Candidate	FPv%	%	Seat	Count
SNP	Richard Lyle	1,523	30.2	1	1
Labour	Harry Curran	1,297	25.7	1	1
Labour	Harry McGuigan	1,128	22.4	1	6
SNP	Helen Gallett	447	8.9		
Conservative	George Clark	366	7.3		
Independent	William Devlin	147	2.9		
Solidarity	Ray Gunnion	138	2.7		
