= Cumbernauld North (ward) =

Electoral ward in North Lanarkshire, Scotland

Location of the ward

Cumbernauld North is one of the twenty-one wards used to elect members of the North Lanarkshire Council. It elects four Councillors and covers the northern parts of Cumbernauld lying north-west of the M80 motorway (Balloch/Eastfield, Blackwood, Carrickstone, Craigmarloch, Smithstone, Westerwood and Westfield) plus the separate older villages of Castlecary and Dullatur. Created in 2007, its boundaries remained unchanged in a 2017 review. In 2019, the population was 17,927.

== Councillors ==
Election	Councillors			
2007	Alan O'Brien (SNP/ Ind.)	Bob Chadha (Labour)	Barry McCulloch (Labour)	Gordon Murray (Ind.)
2012	Alan O'Brien (SNP/ Ind.)	Bob Chadha (Labour)	Barry McCulloch (Labour)	Alan Masterson (SNP)
2017	Danish Ashraf (SNP)	Tom Fisher (Labour)	Calum Currie (Conservative)	Alan Masterson (SNP)
2022	Danish Ashraf (SNP)	Tom Fisher (Labour)	Calum Currie (Conservative)	Alan Masterson (SNP)

== Election results ==
=== 2017 Election ===
Cumbernauld North - 4 seats
Party	Candidate	FPv%	Count									
Party	Candidate	FPv%	1	2	3	4	5	6	7	8	9	10
SNP	Alan Masterton (incumbent)	25.54	1,833									
Conservative	Calum Currie	16.53	1,186	1,189	1,192	1,205	1,216	1,217	1,300	1,334	1,362	1,716
SNP	Danish Ashraf	14.03	1,007	1,331	1,336	1,338	1,444					
Labour	Tom Fisher	11.93	856	864	865	870	899	900	968	1,585		
Labour	Barry McCulloch (incumbent)	10.05	721	730	735	740	759	759	808			
Independent	Alan O'Brien (incumbent)	9.91	711	722	723	733	769	770	1,009	1,051	1,075	
Independent	Fraser Morrison	7.09	509	517	518	521	573	574				
Green	Kevin Hamilton	3.91	281	297	303	305						
UKIP	Carl Pearson	0.63	45	45	45							
Scottish Socialist	John Miller	0.37	27	28								
Electorate: 14,497 Valid: 7,176 Spoilt: 145 Quota: 1,436 Turnout: 7,321 (50.5%)

=== 2012 Election ===
Cumbernauld North - 4 seats
Party	Candidate	FPv%	Count						
Party	Candidate	FPv%	1	2	3	4	5	6	7
Cumbernauld Independent Councillors Alliance	Alan O'Brien (incumbent)	24.3%	1,309						
Labour	Barry McCulloch (incumbent)	18%	971	995.9	1,005.9	1,039.5	1,054.1	1,060.9	1,154.6
Labour	Bob Chadha (incumbent)	17.9%	962	985.4	996.2	1,028.4	1,036.5	1,045.7	1,143.2
SNP	Alan Masterton	17.5%	943	969.2	979.9	999	1,250.7		
SNP	Andrew Roberts	10.9%	588	616.4	620.4	634.4	708.1	853.9	
SNP	Kevin McMail	6.4%	344	356.4	362.3	365.8			
Conservative	Arthur Pawson	4%	216	240.1	244.2				
Scottish Socialist	John Miller	1%	50	63.6					
Electorate: 13,446 Valid: 5,383 Spoilt: 87 Quota: 1,077 Turnout: 5,470 (40.68%)

=== 2007 Election ===
North Lanarkshire council election, 2007: Cumbernauld North
Party	Candidate	FPv%	%	Seat	Count
SNP	Alan O'Brien	1,645	23.1	1	1
Labour	Bob Chadha	1,576	22.5	1	1
Labour	Barry McCulloch	1,362	19.5	1	3
Independent	Gordon Murray	727	10.4	1	9
SNP	Norman R Robinson	641	9.2		
Conservative	Christina Giggie	375	5.4		
Liberal Democrats	Pamela Wilson	321	4.6		
Independent	Donald Masterton	247	3.5		
Scottish Socialist	Davina McNeill	101	1.4		
