= Gartcosh, Glenboig and Moodiesburn (ward) =

Electoral ward in North Lanarkshire, Scotland

Location of the ward

Gartcosh, Glenboig and Moodiesburn is one of the twenty-one wards used to elect members of the North Lanarkshire Council. It had a population of 14,004 in 2019.

It was created in 2017 following a national boundary review that recommended increased representation for the area overall The review led to the eastern third of the Strathkelvin ward and the northern half of the Coatbridge North and Glenboig ward being merged to cover the settlements of Gartcosh, Glenboig and Moodiesburn, returning three councillors.

(The existing wards were renamed Stepps, Chryston and Muirhead and Coatbridge North respectively).

== Councillors ==
Election	Councillors		
2017	Greg Lennon (SNP)	Willie Doolan (Labour)	Michael McPake (Labour)
2022	Greg Lennon (SNP)	Joanne Katy Keltie (SNP)	Michael McPake (Labour)

== Election results ==
=== 2017 Election ===
Gartcosh, Glenboig and Moodiesburn – 3 seats
Party	Candidate	FPv%	Count						
Party	Candidate	FPv%	1	2	3	4	5	6	7
Labour	Willie Doolan	28.6	1,241						
SNP	Greg Lennon	28.46	1,235						
Labour	Michael McPake*	14.47	628	751	759	782	858	1,070	1,370
Conservative	David MacLean	13.53	587	592	592	626	692	722	
Independent	John Wilson	6.41	278	283	286	301			
SNP	Gerry Parker	6.31	274	279	410	420	480		
UKIP	Sean Cairns	2.21	96	97	99				
Electorate: 9,536 Valid: 4,339 Spoilt: 105 Quota: 1,085 Turnout: 4,444 (46.6%)

* = Sitting councillor for Coatbridge North and Glenboig ward
