= British Unionist Party =

- Leader: John Ferguson
- Founded: December 2015; 10 years ago
- Headquarters: 272 Bath Street; Glasgow; G2 4JR
- Ideology: British unionism Scottish unionism Social conservatism Social democracy British nationalism
- Political position: Syncretic
- Colours: Blue, white and red
- Scottish Parliament: 0 / 129
- Local government in Scotland: 1 / 1,227

Website
- www.britishunionists.org

The British Unionist Party (BUP) is a Scottish unionist political party founded in December 2015 as A Better Britain – Unionist Party by activists from the Better Together campaign against Scottish independence. Unlike the mainstream unionist parties, it is critical of the devolution process, which it views as a "slow road to separation". The party has a statement of principles based on the four themes of Union, constitution, industry and sovereignty.

At the 2022 local elections, the BUP gained its first ever elected representative when John Jo Leckie was elected as a councillor in the North Lanarkshire ward of Fortissat.

== History ==
A Better Britain – Unionist Party was formed by activists from the Better Together campaign who opposed the devolution process, and who felt that the mainstream unionist parties had abandoned unionist values in calling for more powers for the Scottish Parliament. It was launched on 31 December 2015, and one of its co-founders, Steven Gordon, conducted an interview with Andrew Neil on the BBC's Daily Politics in early January. Candidates of the party have since stood in the 2016 Scottish parliamentary elections and local elections in 2017 and 2022.

In January 2019, the party changed its name to the British Unionist Party, in order to further highlight their British Unionist credentials. The party was also registered as the British Union & Sovereignty Party until February 2020.

They took one seat in Fortissat in North Lanarkshire from the Scottish Conservatives in the 2022 local elections.

John Ferguson, a former UK Independence Party (UKIP) candidate, was announced as the BUP's new leader in May 2023.

== Policies ==
=== Unionism ===
The BUP opposes the devolution process, and believes that the new powers granted to the Scottish Parliament on the basis of the Smith Commission go too far. It also opposes any further referendums on Scottish independence, and has called for both the British and Scottish parliaments to work together to pursue closer union. In addition to this, it proposes several pro-UK cultural policies such as flying the Union Flag from council buildings in Scotland, and reversing what it sees as the nationalist re-branding of the Scottish Government by restoring its logo to the Scottish version of the royal coat of arms as used by the Labour–Lib Dem Scottish Executive. The party also calls for the protection of UK institutions in Scotland, and has opposed the absorption of the British Transport Police into Police Scotland, and called for Trident & Faslane Naval Base to be retained at their current location on the Scottish west coast.

=== Social democracy ===
The BUP has stated its opposition to the extent of cuts to public services under the Conservative government, and has specifically opposed any further cuts to the NHS, Royal Mail (before it was fully privatised), the Armed Forces and education. It opposed a universal 1p tax rise in Scotland as proposed by Labour and the Liberal Democrats, but supported calls for the reintroduction of a 50% rate for earnings in the highest income bracket. It has also called for better care for the elderly, including a rise in Winter Fuel Payment rates and a reduction in TV licence fees for those over 65.

=== More powers for local government ===
The party calls for greater powers for local government, and has criticised the centralising nature of the Scottish Parliament under the Scottish National Party (SNP). Notably, it has called for Police Scotland and Fire & Rescue Scotland to be abolished, and for local police, fire and rescue services to be restored. It has also criticised the tax freeze imposed on local councils by the Scottish government, and stated that local councils should have more control over their own spending.

=== Civil liberties ===
The party has been particularly critical of several pieces of SNP legislation which it regards as an infringement on civil liberties. It has criticised the Named Person Scheme as a "totalitarian state invasion into family life", and the Offensive Behaviour at Football Act for "criminalising ordinary football fans". It has called for both pieces of legislation to be scrapped.

== Electoral performance ==
The party contested the 2016 Scottish parliamentary elections, standing on the regional ballot for the Glasgow region. The BUP won 2,453 votes (1.0%), failing to win a seat.

In September 2017, at a local by-election in North Lanarkshire's Fortissat ward, John Jo Leckie ran as the BUP's candidate for the seat. Though not elected, he finished second to the successful Labour candidate, Clare Quigley, with 23.3% of first-preferences.

The party did not run candidates in the 2021 Scottish Parliament election. John Mortimer, a founding member and then leader of the BUP, set up the single-issue Abolish the Scottish Parliament Party to contest the election instead, which saw candidates stand unsuccessfully in all eight of the regional lists.

The BUP took 859 first-preference votes (18.8%) in Fortissat at the 2022 Scottish local elections, enough to see John Jo Leckie win one of the four seats in the ward. This was the party's first ever representation at any level in Scottish politics.

At the 2024 general election, the BUP stood two candidates: John Jo Leckie in Airdrie and Shotts and John Ferguson in Motherwell, Wishaw and Carluke. They took 1.2% and 0.4% of votes in their respective constituencies, and were not elected.

Billy Acheson stood for the party at the Fortissat by-election in October 2024, coming fourth with 241 first-preferences (10.9%).

The BUP said they would field candidates at the 2026 Scottish Parliament election. One candidate lost their deposit.

== See also ==
- Scottish Unionist Party
- Unionism in Scotland
