= Stepps, Chryston and Muirhead (ward) =

Electoral ward in North Lanarkshire, Scotland

Location of the ward

Stepps, Chryston and Muirhead is one of the twenty-one wards used to elect members of the North Lanarkshire Council. It currently elects three councillors and, as its name suggests, covers the settlements of Stepps, Chryston and Muirhead (as well as Auchinloch) with a combined population of 12,290 in 2019.

It was created in 2007 as Strathkelvin, covering a larger territory also including Gartcosh and Moodiesburn (the eastern boundary being the M73 motorway) and returning four councillors. A nationwide boundary review in 2017 that recommended more representation for the area overall led to these communities being placed in a separate new ward (along with Glenboig from the Coatbridge North ward), with the remainder of the Strathkelvin ward renamed and returning one fewer councillor. A specific review in 2019 caused the addition of a few streets of modern housing at Cardowan which had been in the North East ward of the Glasgow City Council area, re-allocating them to North Lanarkshire along with the rest of the developments in that area, addressing an anomaly dating back to when the boundary crossed open fields.

== Councillors ==
Election	Councillors			
2007	Frances McGlinchey (SNP)	Joe Shaw (Labour)	Brian Wallace (Labour)	William Hogg (Labour)
2012	Frances McGlinchey (SNP)	John McLaren (Labour)	Brian Wallace (Labour)	William Hogg (Labour)
2017	Lynne Anderson (SNP/ Alba)	John McLaren (Labour)	Steven Goldsack (Conservative)	3 seats
2021	Lynne Anderson (SNP/ Alba)	John McLaren (Labour)	Steven Goldsack (Conservative)	3 seats
2022	Josh Cairns (SNP)	John McLaren (Labour)	Claire Louise Williams (Green)	3 seats

== Election results ==
=== 2022 Election ===
Stepps, Chryston and Muirhead- 3 seats
Party	Candidate	FPv%	Count						
Party	Candidate	FPv%	1	2	3	4	5	6	7
SNP	Josh Cairns	26.8	1,299						
Labour	John McLaren (incumbent)	23.9	1,159	1,162	1,204	1,272			
Conservative	Crissy Sandhu	15.0	725	725	757	766	772	870	
Green	Claire Louise Williams	10.8	523	529	557	856	859	1,044	1,218
Labour	Margaret-Anne Shaw	10.7	521	523	549	603	646		
SNP	Ian MacQuarrie	9.6	467	539	548				
Liberal Democrats	Neil K. Casey	3.2	154	155					
Electorate: 10,567 Valid: 4,848 Spoilt: 111 Quota: 1,213 Turnout: 46.9%

=== 2017 Election ===
Stepps, Chryston and Muirhead- 3 seats
Party	Candidate	FPv%	Count				
Party	Candidate	FPv%	1	2	3	4	5
SNP	Lynne Anderson	28.34	1,292				
Conservative	Stephen Goldsack	21.65	987	989	998	1,084	1,126
Labour	John McLaren (incumbent)	19.26	878	885	935	1,101	1,876
Labour	Scott Lamond	16.65	759	765	817	913	
Independent	Frances McGlinchey (incumbent)	9.12	416	421	552		
SNP	Stephen Kirley	4.98	227	352			
Electorate: 9,309 Valid: 4,559 Spoilt: 114 Quota: 1,140 Turnout: 4673 (50.2%)

- On 22 May 2018, Conservative councillor Stephen Goldsack was expelled from the party after previous connections to the British National Party were exposed.

=== 2012 Election ===
Strathkelvin - 4 seats
Party	Candidate	FPv%	Count					
Party	Candidate	FPv%	1	2	3	4	5	6
Labour	William Hogg (incumbent)	22.6%	1,418					
SNP	Frances McGlinchey (incumbent)	19.9%	1,245	1,255.2				
Labour	Brian Wallace (incumbent)	15.4%	947	962.9	963	1,007.4	1,109.9	1,226
Labour	John McLaren	14.0%	865	976.6	976.7	1,058.9	1,144.8	1,351.7
SNP	June McHugh	13.3%	821	829.7	831.6	898.9	1,008.1	
Conservative	Andrew Polson	10.3%	635	637.7	637.7	682.7		
Independent	Joe Shaw (incumbent)	5.4%	330	333.7	333.7			
Electorate: 15,534 Valid: 6,261 Spoilt: 88 Quota: 1,253 Turnout: 6,394 (41.16%)

- SNP councillor Frances McGlinchey resigned from the party on 24 October 2012 in protest at the vote to overturn its long-standing opposition to NATO.

=== 2007 Election ===
North Lanarkshire council election, 2007: Strathkelvin
Party	Candidate	FPv%	%	Seat	Count
SNP	Frances McGlinchey	2,055	26.4	1	1
Labour	William Hogg	1,795	23.5	1	1
Labour	Brian Wallace	1,309	16.9	1	6
Labour	Joe Shaw	1,208	15.6	1	4
Conservative	Jonathan Oak	872	11.2		
Solidarity	Jack Doyle	409	5.4		
