= Coatbridge North (ward) =

Electoral ward in North Lanarkshire, Scotland

Location of the ward

Coatbridge North is one of the twenty-one wards used to elect members of the North Lanarkshire Council. It elects four councillors. Covering neighbourhoods in the north of Coatbridge (Blairhill, Cliftonville, Drumpellier, Dunbeth, Gartsherrie, Greenhill, Parklands, Summerlee, Sunnyside, Townhead and the town centre), the ward had a population of 15,146 in 2019.

It was created in 2007 as Coatbridge North and Glenboig, originally covering around twice as much territory between Coatbridge and Condorrat about 4 miles (6.4 km) further north, largely rural and sparsely populated but including the expanding commuter village of Glenboig. A nationwide boundary review in 2017 that recommended more representation for the area overall led to this rural half being placed in a separate new ward (along with Gartcosh and Moodiesburn from the Strathkelvin ward), but the electorate in the existing ward reduced only a slightly as a result and the number of seats was unaffected.

== Councillors ==
Election	Councillors			
2007	John Wilson (SNP)	Tony Clarke (Labour)	Bill Shields (Labour)	Martin McWilliams (Independent)
2009 by-	Peter Sullivan (Labour)	Tony Clarke (Labour)	Bill Shields (Labour)	Martin McWilliams (Independent)
2011 by-	Peter Sullivan (Labour)	Michael McPake (Labour)	Bill Shields (Labour)	Martin McWilliams (Independent)
2012	Fulton MacGregor (SNP)	Michael McPake (Labour)	Bill Shields (Labour)	Julie McAnulty (SNP)
2016 by-	Alex McVey (Labour)	Michael McPake (Labour)	Bill Shields (Labour)	Julie McAnulty (SNP)
2017	Alex McVey (Labour)	Kirsten Larson (SNP)	Bill Shields (Labour)	Allan Stubbs (SNP)
2022	Alex McVey (Labour)	Kirsten Larson (SNP)	Bill Shields (Labour)	Allan Stubbs (SNP)

== Election results ==
=== 2022 Election ===
The SNP (2) and Labour (2) retained the seats they had won at the previous election.

Coatbridge North - 4 seats
Party	Candidate	FPv%	Count								
Party	Candidate	FPv%	1	2	3	4	5	6	7	8	9
SNP	Kirsten Larson (incumbent)	31.2	1,545								
Labour	Alexander McVey (incumbent)	20.5	1,017								
SNP	Allan Stubbs (incumbent)	15.1	749	1,197							
Labour	Bill Shields (incumbent)	13.4	663	691	726	747	762	785	832	992	1,188
Conservative	Craig Whiteside	9.7	479	482	484	484	490	497	546	562	
SDP	Jeff McDonald	3.5	172	179	183	183	192	202			
ISP	Julie Patricia McNulty	2.6	129	147	180	181	208	271	286		
Alba	Mark Shields	2.5	123	136	163	163	169				
Scottish Family	Leo Francis Lanahan	1.6	79	85	90	91					
Electorate: 12,021 Valid: 4,956 Spoilt: 148 Quota: 992 Turnout: 42.5%

=== 2017 Election ===
Coatbridge North - 4 seats
Party	Candidate	FPv%	Count						
Party	Candidate	FPv%	1	2	3	4	5	6	7
SNP	Kirsten Larson	22.56	1,100						
Labour	Alex McVey (incumbent)	21.06	1,027						
Conservative	Ben Callaghan	14.83	723	724	726	728	749	806	
Labour	Bill Shields (incumbent)	13.53	660	665	704	721	786	913	1,228
SNP	Allan Stubbs	12.22	596	693	694	741	788	945	975
Independent	Julie McAnulty (incumbent)	8.67	423	428	430	460	512		
Independent	Martin McWilliams	4.9	239	241	243	249			
Green	Graham Kerr	2.24	109	115	116				
Electorate: 12,055 Valid: 4,877 Spoilt: 162 Quota: 976 Turnout: 5,039 (41.8%)

=== 2012 Election ===
Coatbridge North and Glenboig - 4 seats
Party	Candidate	FPv%	Count				
Party	Candidate	FPv%	1	2	3	4	5
Labour	Michael McPake (incumbent)	33.0%	1,599				
Labour	Bill Shields (incumbent)	20.0%	900	1,467.8			
SNP	Fulton James MacGregor	15.8%	765	777.6	810.2	841.1	947.4
SNP	Julie McAnulty	15.0%	725	752.2	818.1	840.1	1,038.2
Independent	Martin McWilliams (incumbent)	10.2%	496	540.1	651.4	768	
Conservative	William Millar	6.0%	289	291.4	313.5		
Electorate: 14,277 Valid: 4,841 Spoilt: 99 Quota: 969 Turnout: 4,940 (34.6%)

==== 2016 By-election ====
- Councillor Fulton James McGregor was elected as a MSP for Coatbridge and Chryston in the 2016 Scottish Parliament election. On 29 June 2016 he resigned his council seat. A by-election was held on 22 September 2016 which was won by Labour's Alex McVey.

Coatbridge North and Glenboig By-election (22 September 2016) - 1 Seat
Party	Candidate	FPv%	Count
Party	Candidate	FPv%	1
Labour	Alex McVey	41.7	1,350
SNP	Stephen Kirley	39.0	1,261
Conservative	Ben Callaghan	11.3	366
Green	John Wilson	6.0	195
UKIP	Neil Wilson	1.9	63
Electorate: Valid: 3,235 Spoilt: 42 Quota: 1,618 Turnout: 3,277 (23.67%)

=== 2007 Election ===
North Lanarkshire council election, 2007: Coatbridge North and Glenboig
Party	Candidate	FPv%	%	Seat	Count
SNP	John Wilson	1,983	29.4	1	1
Labour	Tony Clarke	1,982	29.4	1	3
Labour	Bill Shields	828	12.3	1	5
Conservative	Alexander Thornton	714	10.6		
Independent	Martin McWilliams	604	9.0	1	7
Labour	Gerry Somers	416	6.2		
Scottish Socialist	John Moffat	219	3.3		

==== 2009 By-election ====
- The SNP's John Wilson resigned following his election as an MSP. Peter Sullivan gained the seat for Labour in the resulting by-election.

Coatbridge North and Glenboig By-Election (4 June 2009)- 1 seat
Party	Candidate	FPv%	Count					
Party	Candidate	FPv%	1	2	3	4	5	6
Labour	Peter Sullivan	37.2	1,529	1,542	1,558	1,577	1,615	1,759
SNP	Allan Stubbs	30.5	1,254	1,276	1,307	1,357	1,446	1,696
Independent	Julie McAnulty	13.5	557	565	604	635	730	
Conservative	Bob Burgess	8.8	361	365	372	387		
Independent	Hugh Banford	5.3	217	218	218			
Green	Kristofer Keane	2.8	115	126				
Scottish Socialist	Fraser Coats	2.0	81					
Labour gain from SNP		Swing						
Electorate: 14,270 Valid: 4,114 Spoilt: 67 Quota: 2058 Turnout: 4,181 (29.3%)

==== 2011 By-election ====
- Labour Party's Tony Clarke died on 24 August 2011. Michael McPake held the seat in the resulting by-election.

Coatbridge North and Glenboig By-Election (27 October 2011)- 1 seat
Party	Candidate	FPv%	Count
Party	Candidate	FPv%	1
Labour	Michael McPake	52.3	1,527
SNP	Julie McAnulty	39.0	1,139
Conservative	Bob Burgess	6.0	174
Liberal Democrats	Graham Dale	2.7	78
Labour hold		Swing	
Electorate: 14,590 Valid: 2,919 Spoilt: 15 Quota: 1,460 Turnout: 2,934 (20.11%)
