= Kilsyth (ward) =

Electoral ward in North Lanarkshire, Scotland

Location of the ward

Kilsyth is one of the twenty-one wards used to elect members of the North Lanarkshire Council. It elects three councillors and covers the town of Kilsyth (plus neighbouring Croy) with a population of 13,772 in 2019. Created in 2007, its boundaries remained unchanged in a 2017 review.

== Councillors ==
Election	Councillors		
2007	David Key (SNP)	Francis Griffin (Labour)	Jean Jones (Labour)
2008 by-	David Key (SNP)	Mark Griffin (Labour)	Jean Jones (Labour)
2012	Alan Stevenson (SNP)	Heather McVey (Labour)	Jean Jones (Labour)
2017	Mark Kerr (SNP)	Heather McVey (Labour)	Jean Jones (Labour)
2022	Denis Johnston (SNP)	Heather McVey (Labour)	Jean Jones (Labour)

== Election results ==
=== 2017 Election ===
Kilsyth - 3 seats
Party	Candidate	FPv%	Count						
Party	Candidate	FPv%	1	2	3	4	5	6	7
Labour	Jean Jones (incumbent)	33.7	1,496						
SNP	Alan Stevenson (incumbent)	17.57	780	740	756	783	785	811	
SNP	Mark Kerr	17.19	763	781	806	847	848	892	1,593
Labour	Heather McVey (incumbent)	16.47	731	1,097	1,104	1,126			
Conservative	Paul Anderson	11.33	503	515	516	524	527		
Green	Rob Kay	2.18	97	102	118				
Solidarity	Kevin Kane	1.55	69	74					
Electorate: 9,657 Valid: 4,439 Spoilt: 119 Quota: 1,110 Turnout: 4,558 (47.2%)

- In July 2020 SNP councillor Mark Kerr was charged with five counts of historic sexual abuse by Police Scotland. This generated significant coverage in various national news outlets and Mr Kerr subsequently stepped down from the SNP, identifying as an Independent councillor from then on. He made no plea at his initial court hearing.

On Friday 2 December 2022, Ex Cllr Mark John Kerr, was jailed for 6 years and place on the sex offenders register for life, after being found guilty of multiple charges including attempted rape.

=== 2012 Election ===
Kilsyth - 3 seats
Party	Candidate	FPv%	Count				
Party	Candidate	FPv%	1	2	3	4	5
Labour	Jean Jones (incumbent)	43.0%	1,544				
SNP	Alan Stevenson	21.5%	771	789.8	842.4	876.9	928.3
Labour	Heather McVey	20.2%	724	1,290			
SNP	Scott Campbell	9.0%	324	338.2	363.2	371.2	403.7
Conservative	David Paterson	3.7%	132	135.3	152.9		
Scottish Socialist	Wullie O'Neill	2.7%	98	108.9	172.7	185.4	
Electorate: 9,302 Valid: 3,593 Spoilt: 98 Quota: 899 Turnout: 3,691 (39.68%)

=== 2007 Election ===
North Lanarkshire council election, 2007: Kilsyth
Party	Candidate	FPv%	%	Seat	Count
Labour	Francis Griffin	2,037	38.3	1	1
SNP	David Key	1,480	27.8	1	1
Labour	Jean Jones	1,386	26.0	1	1
Conservative	Archie Giggie	260	4.9		
Scottish Socialist	Willie O'Neill	162	3.0		

==== 2008 by-election ====
Labour's Francis Griffin died on 10 November 2007. Mark Griffin held the seat for the party in the resulting by-election on 31 January 2008.

Kilsyth By-Election (31 January 2008)- 1 seat
Party	Candidate	FPv%	Count
Party	Candidate	FPv%	1
Labour	Mark Griffin	63.4	1,855
SNP	Claire Fyvie	30.4	891
Green	Rob Kay	2.3	66
Conservative	Robert Burgess	1.7	50
Scottish Socialist	Willie O'Neill	1.6	48
Liberal Democrats	Stuart Douglas	0.6	17
Turnout		2,947	32.1
Labour hold		Swing	
