= Coatbridge South (ward) =

Electoral ward in North Lanarkshire, Scotland

Location of the ward

Coatbridge South is one of the twenty-one wards used to elect members of the North Lanarkshire Council. Covering neighbourhoods in the south-east of Coatbridge (Calderwood, Carnbroe, Greenend, Kirkshaws, Rosehall, Shawhead, Sikeside, Victoria Park and Whifflet), it currently elects four councillors. A boundary review in 2017 caused the addition of an area between Langloan Street, the A725 and the A89, with a small increase in the electorate and an additional seat from the original three. The ward had a population of 16,889 in 2019.

== Councillors ==
Election	Councillors			
2007	James Brooks (Labour)	John Higgins (Labour)	Ian Ferrie (SNP)	3 seats
2012	James Brooks (Labour)	John Higgins (Labour)	Imtiaz Majid (SNP)	3 seats
2017	Tom Castles (Labour)	Gordon Encinias (Labour)	Tracy Carragyer (SNP)	Fergus MacGregor (SNP)
2018 by-	Tom Castles (Labour)	Geraldine Woods (Labour)	Tracy Carragyer (SNP)	Fergus MacGregor (SNP)
2022	Andrew Bustard (Labour)	Geraldine Woods (Labour)	Tracy Carragyer (SNP)	Fergus MacGregor (SNP)

== Election results ==
=== 2022 Election ===
Coatbridge South - 4 seats
Party	Candidate	FPv%	Count					
Party	Candidate	FPv%	1	2	3	4	5	6
SNP	Tracy Carragher (incumbent)	28.5	1,384					
SNP	Fergus MacGregor (incumbent)	24.6	1,195					
Labour	Andrew Bustard	22.7	1,100					
Labour	Geraldine Woods (incumbent)	12.2	593	676	719	814	866	981
Conservative	Peter Murray	6.7	327	333	335	344	374	398
Independent	Tony Grimason	3.1	149	180	203	207		
Green	Graham James Kerr	2.1	101	228	292	297	351	
Electorate: 13,164 Valid: 4,849 Spoilt: 209 Quota: 970 Turnout: 5,058 (38.4%)

=== 2017 Election ===
Coatbridge South - 4 seats
Party	Candidate	FPv%	Count							
Party	Candidate	FPv%	1	2	3	4	5	6	7	8
SNP	Tracy Carragher	29.95	1,392							
Labour	Tom Castles	22.72	1,056							
SNP	Fergus MacGregor	12.76	593	966						
Conservative	John Cameron	11.88	552	557	560	560	567	588	653	
Labour	Gordon Encinias	6.8	316	338	442	447	479	517	693	932
Independent Alliance North Lanarkshire	Jim Brooks (incumbent)	6.69	311	322	324	327	425	517		
Independent	Gerry Somers	4.65	216	225	227	233	275			
Independent Alliance North Lanarkshire	John Higgins (incumbent)	4.54	211	223	226	230				
Electorate: 12,726 Valid: 4,647 Spoilt: 189 Quota: 930 Turnout: 4,836 (38.0%)

==== 2018 By-election ====
- On 13 August 2018, Labour councillor Gordon Encinias died, having been unwell for some time. A by-election was held on 25 October and the seat was held by Geraldine Woods of Scottish Labour.

Coatbridge South By-election (25 October 2018) - 1 Seat
Party	Candidate	FPv%	Count					
Party	Candidate	FPv%	1	2	3	4	5	6
Labour	Geraldine Woods	42.2	1,355	1,360	1,364	1,380	1,549	2,070
SNP	Lesley Mitchell	41.8	1,343	1,344	1,346	1,360	1,405	
Conservative	Ben Callaghan	13.8	492	494	496	499		
Green	Rosemary McGowan	1.5	47	50	51			
UKIP	Neil Wilson	0.4	14	14				
Liberal Democrats	Christopher Wilson	0.4	13					
Electorate: 12,766 Valid: 3,264 Spoilt: 48 Quota: 1,633 Turnout: 3,312 (25.9%)

=== 2012 Election ===
Coatbridge South - 3 seats
Party	Candidate	FPv%	Count				
Party	Candidate	FPv%	1	2	3	4	5
Labour	Jim Brooks (incumbent)	40.8%	1,568				
SNP	Imtiaz Majid	21.5%	827	848.6	900.3	951.6	1,389
Labour	John Higgins (incumbent)	21.2%	814	1,324.1			
SNP	Gerry Somers	12.1%	466	479.9	529.1	559.9	
Conservative	Colin Gibson	4.4%	171	186.1	208.2		
Electorate: 11,130 Valid: 3,846 Spoilt: 122 Quota: 962 Turnout: 3,968 (35.65%)

=== 2007 Election ===
North Lanarkshire council election, 2007: Coatbridge South
Party	Candidate	FPv%	%	Seat	Count
Labour	James Brooks	1,682	35.0	1	1
SNP	Ian Ferrie	1,503	31.3	1	1
Labour	John Higgins	1,057	22.0	1	2
Conservative	Robert Hargrave	392	8.2		
Scottish Socialist	Craig Coats	172	3.6		
