= 1995 North Lanarkshire Council election =

1995 Scottish local government election

The 1995 North Lanarkshire Council election was held on 6 April 1995, the same day as the other Scottish local government elections.

== Results ==
1995 North Lanarkshire Council election result
Party	Seats	Gains	Losses	Net gain/loss	Seats %	Votes %	Votes	+/−
Labour	60	-	-		87.0	62.3	71,738	
SNP	7	-	-		10.1	30.2	34,746	
Independent	2	-	-		2.9	2.0	2,354	
Conservative	0	-	-		0.0	3.9	4,467	
Independent Labour	0	-	-		0.0	0.8	963	
Scottish Militant Labour	0	-	-		0.0	0.4	512	
Liberal Democrats	0	-	-		0.0	0.2	255	
Scottish Green	0	-	-		0.0	0.1	164	
