= Coatbridge West (ward) =

Electoral ward in North Lanarkshire, Scotland

Location of the ward

Coatbridge West is one of the twenty-one wards used to elect members of the North Lanarkshire Council. Covering neighbourhoods in the south-west of Coatbridge (Barrowfield, Dundyvan, Kirkwood, Langloan, Old Monkland) and the separate village of Bargeddie, it elects three councillors. A boundary review in 2017 caused the loss of an area between Langloan Street, the A725 and the A89, with a small decrease in the electorate but no change in the number of seats. The ward had a population of 14,910 in 2019.

== Councillors ==
Election	Councillors		
2007	Tom Magginis (Labour)	Jim Smith (Labour)	Paul Welsh (SNP)
2012	Tom Magginis (Labour)	Jim Smith (Labour)	Paul Welsh (SNP)
2013 by-	Kevin Docherty (Labour)	Jim Smith (Labour)	Paul Welsh (SNP)
2017	Kevin Docherty (Labour)	Mary Gourlay (Labour)	Caroline Stephen (SNP)
2022	Kevin Docherty (Labour)	Lesley Mitchell (SNP)	Gary Robinson (SNP)

== Election results ==
=== 2022 Election ===
Coatbridge West - 3 seats
Party	Candidate	FPv%	Count				
Party	Candidate	FPv%	1	2	3	4	5
SNP	Lesley Mitchell	32.2	1,254				
Labour	Kevin Docherty (incumbent)	29.8	1,159				
SNP	Gary Robinson	15.7	613	869	876	885	1,038
Labour	Mary Gourlay (incumbent)	9.6	374	380	530	649	709
Alba	Robert Slavin	6.5	254	262	268	289	
Conservative	Laraine Shields	6.2	240	240	244		
Electorate: 10,411 Valid: 3,894 Spoilt: 159 Quota: 974 Turnout: 4,053 (38.9%)

=== 2017 Election ===
Coatbridge West - 3 seats
Party	Candidate	FPv%	Count				
Party	Candidate	FPv%	1	2	3	4	5
Labour	Kevin Docherty (incumbent)	36.52	1,378				
SNP	Caroline Stephen	34.8	1,313				
SNP	Paul Welsh (incumbent)	10.15	383	403	722	745	
Labour	Mary Gourlay	9.44	356	702	718	878	1,196
Conservative	Francis McIntyre	9.09	343	352	356		
Electorate: 10,107 Valid: 3,773 Spoilt: 209 Quota: 944 Turnout: 3,982 (39.4%)

=== 2012 Election ===
Coatbridge West - 3 seats
Party	Candidate	FPv%	Count	
Party	Candidate	FPv%	1	2
Labour	Tom Maginnis (incumbent)	41.0%	1,570	
Labour	Jim Smith (incumbent)	33.8%	1,295	
SNP	Paul Welsh (incumbent)	22.4%	858	1,037.3
Conservative	Archie Giggie	2.8%	107	145.6
Electorate: 11,272 Valid: 3,830 Spoilt: 105 Quota: 958 Turnout: 3,935 (34.91%)

- Labour Party councillor Tom Maginnis died on 29 November 2012. A by-election was held on 28 February 2013 and the seat was retained by Labour's Kevin Docherty.
- On 8 March 2016, Labour councillor Jim Smith resigned from the party and became Independents.

==== 2013 by-election ====
Coatbridge West By-election (28 February 2013) - 1 Seat
Party	Candidate	FPv%	Count
Party	Candidate	FPv%	1
Labour	Kevin Docherty	78.8%	2,145
SNP	Patrick Rolink	16.6%	452
Conservative	Ashley Baird	2.6%	71
UKIP	Billy Mitchell	1.2%	34
Liberal Democrats	John Love	0.7%	19
Electorate: Valid: 2,721 Spoilt: 27 Quota: 1,361 Turnout: 2,748 (24.11%)

=== 2007 Election ===
North Lanarkshire council election, 2007: Coatbridge West
Party	Candidate	FPv%	%	Seat	Count
Labour	Tom Magginis	1,872	37.4	1	1
Labour	Jim Smith	1,476	29.5	1	1
SNP	Paul Welsh	1,218	24.3	1	2
Conservative	Mark Oak	251	5.0		
Scottish Socialist	Charlie McCarthy	192	3.8		
