= Fortissat =

One of the wards to elect council members

Location of the ward

Fortissat is one of the twenty-one wards used to elect members of the North Lanarkshire Council. Created in 2007, it originally returned three councillors; a 2017 national review resulted in no changes in the boundaries but an extra seat being added. The ward's territory covers the town of Shotts and surrounding areas (including Allanton, Bonkle, Harthill, Hartwood, Morningside and Salsburgh) with a population of 15,730 in 2019.

== Councillors ==
Election	Councillors			
2007	Jim Robertson (Labour)	Charles Cefferty (Ind.)	Malcolm McMillan (SNP)	3 seats
2012	Jim Robertson (Labour)	Charles Cefferty (Ind.)	Thomas Cochrane (SNP, then Ind.)	3 seats
2017	Martin McCulloch (Labour)	Kenneth Stevenson (Labour)	Thomas Cochrane (SNP, then Ind.)	Sandy Thornton (Conservative)
2017 by-	Martin McCulloch (Labour)	Kenneth Stevenson (Labour)	Thomas Cochrane (SNP, then Ind.)	Clare Quigley (Labour)
2021 by-	Martin McCulloch (Labour)	Kenneth Stevenson (Labour)	Peter Kelly (Labour)	Clare Quigley (Labour)
2022	Martin McCulloch (Labour)	Kenneth Stevenson (Labour)	Margaret Hughes (SNP)	John Jo Leckie (BUP)
2024 by-	Martin McCulloch (Labour)	Clare Quigley (Labour)	Margaret Hughes (SNP)	John Jo Leckie (BUP)

== Election results ==
=== 2024 by-election ===
Fortissat (10 October 2024) – 1 seat
Party	Candidate	FPv%	Count					
Party	Candidate	FPv%	1	2	3	4	5	6
Labour	Clare Quigley	36.6	807	818	834	892	1,007	1,292
Progressive Change North Lanarkshire	Mary McIntosh	24.0	529	542	556	634	757	
SNP	Brendan McAleese	20.3	447	452	457	466		
BUP	Billy Acheson	10.9	241	245	297			
Conservative	Sheila Cameron	5.6	124	131				
Liberal Democrats	Leigh Butler	2.6	57					
Electorate: 12,422 Valid: 2,205 Spoilt: 22 Quota: 1,103 Turnout: 17.9%

=== 2022 election ===
Fortissat – 4 seats
Party	Candidate	FPv%	Count					
Party	Candidate	FPv%	1	2	3	4	5	6
Labour	Martin McCulloch (incumbent)	22.5	1,028					
SNP	Margaret Hughes	20.8	949					
BUP	John Jo Leckie	18.8	859	864	864	870	1,136	
Labour	Kenneth Stevenson (incumbent)	14.0	636	729	730	753	867	957
Conservative	Ben Callaghan	11.2	512	514	515	523		
SNP	Sarah Quinn	10.0	457	463	494	547	561	571
Green	Emma Rachel Cuthbertson	2.6	118	119	121			
Electorate: 12,104 Valid: 4,559 Spoilt: 123 Quota: 912 Turnout: 38.7%

=== 2017 election ===
Fortissat - 4 seats
Party	Candidate	FPv%	Count					
Party	Candidate	FPv%	1	2	3	4	5	6
Labour	Martin McCulloch	29.29	1,477					
SNP	Thomas Cochrane (incumbent)	20.15	1,016					
Conservative	Sandy Thornton	13.29	670	678	678	691	948	1,121
BUP	Jeffrey McDonald	11.08	559	574	574	591		
Independent	Charlie Cefferty (incumbent)	10.09	509	527	527	661	754	
SNP	Mags Murphy	8.9	449	469	475			
Labour	Kenneth Stevenson	7.2	363	715	715	806	891	1,117
Electorate: 12,051 Valid: 5,043 Spoilt: 139 Quota: 1,009 Turnout: 5,182 (43.0%)

==== 2017 by-election ====
Conservative candidate Sandy Thornton refused to sign his acceptance of office, resulting in the seat becoming vacant on 28 June 2017. A by-election took place on 7 September 2017 and was won by Clare Quigley of the Scottish Labour Party.

Fortissat By-election (7 September 2017) - 1 Seat
Party	Candidate	FPv%	Count						
Party	Candidate	FPv%	1	2	3	4	5	6	7
Labour	Clare Quigley	38.5	1,420	1,421	1,426	1,466	1,546	1,827	2,117
BUP	John Jo Leckie	23.3	858	865	867	913	1,088	1,139	
SNP	Mags Murphy	20.6	761	762	770	791	804		
Conservative	Norma McNab	11.5	424	427	428	459			
Independent	Charlie Cefferty	5.0	184	184	188				
Green	Kyle Davidson	0.7	24	26					
UKIP	Daryl Gardner	0.5	18						
Electorate: 12,163 Valid: 3,689 Spoilt: 47 Quota: 1,845 Turnout: 3,736 (30.7%)

==== 2021 by-election ====
On 8 May 2018, councillor Tommy Cochrane resigned from the SNP and became an Independent, citing lack of SNP support in the area. He resigned his seat on 18 March 2020 saying he was increasingly unable to manage personal and work commitments. A by-election was held in 2021 (delayed by the COVID-19 pandemic in Scotland), won by Labour's Peter Kelly.

Fortissat by-election (4 March 2021) - 1 Seat
Party	Candidate	FPv%	Count			
Party	Candidate	FPv%	1	2	3	4
Labour	Peter Kelly	38.4%	1,071	1,073	1,093	1,408
SNP	Sarah Quinn	34.6%	965	970	994	1,026
Conservative	Ben Callaghan	23.5%	656	664	679	
Green	Kyle Davidson	2.5%	69	74		
UKIP	Neil Wilson	1.1%	31			
Electorate: TBC Valid: 2,792 Spoilt: 29 Quota: 1,397 Turnout: 23.3%

=== 2012 election ===
Fortissat - 3 seats
Party	Candidate	FPv%	Count				
Party	Candidate	FPv%	1	2	3	4	5
Labour	Francis Fallan	23.0%	983	988	1,022	1,023.4	
Labour	Jim Robertson (incumbent)	22.9%	982	1,000	1,046	1,048.3	1,843.2
Independent	Charlie Cefferty (incumbent)	22.9%	981	1,023	1,079		
SNP	Thomas Cochrane	16.2%	695	700	1,062	1,063.4	1,136.6
SNP	Malcolm McMillan (incumbent)	12.4%	529	543			
Conservative	Sandy Thornton	2.6%	111				
Electorate: 11,314 Valid: 4,281 Spoilt: 94 Quota: 1,071 Turnout: 4,375 (38.67%)

=== 2007 election ===
North Lanarkshire council election, 2007: Fortissat
Party	Candidate	FPv%	%	Seat	Count
Labour	Jim Robertson	1,596	28.3	1	1
Independent	Charles Cefferty	1,529	27.1	1	1
SNP	Malcolm McMillan	1,396	24.7	1	2
Labour	Clare Margaret Quigley	1,125	19.9		
