= Mossend and Holytown (ward) =

Electoral ward in North Lanarkshire, Scotland

Location of the ward

Mossend and Holytown is one of the twenty-one wards used to elect members of the North Lanarkshire Council. Created in 2007, it elects three councillors.

As its name suggests, its territory comprises the localities of Mossend (as well as parts of Bellshill including the town centre east of Motherwell Road, and the Thorndean and Milnwood neighbourhoods) and neighbouring Holytown (plus part of New Stevenston – streets north of the Shotts Line railway tracks). A 2017 boundary review reduced the territory in central Bellshill slightly, and caused a small decrease in the electorate. The ward had a population of 13,480 in 2019.

== Councillors ==
Election	Councillors		
2007	Paul Delaney (SNP)	James Coyle (Labour)	Kevin McKeown (Labour)
2012	David Baird (SNP/ Alba)	James Coyle (Labour)	Frank McNally (Labour)
2017	David Baird (SNP/ Alba)	Jim Reddin (Labour)	Frank McNally (Labour)
2021	David Baird (SNP/ Alba)	Jim Reddin (Labour)	Frank McNally (Labour)
2022	Beth Baudo (SNP/ Progressive Change NL/ Labour)	Jim Reddin (Labour)	Frank McNally (Labour)
2023	Beth Baudo (SNP/ Progressive Change NL/ Labour)	Jim Reddin (Labour)	Frank McNally (Labour)
2024	Beth Baudo (SNP/ Progressive Change NL/ Labour)	Jim Reddin (Labour)	Helena Gray (Labour)

Beth Baudo defected from the SNP to Progressive Change North Lanarkshire in 2023. In January 2024, she again defected, this time to Scottish Labour.

== Election results ==
=== 2024 by-election ===
Mossend and Holytown (10 October 2024) – 1 seat
Party	Candidate	FPv%	Count					
Party	Candidate	FPv%	1	2	3	4	5	6
Labour	Helena Gray	36.5	616	616	640	668	722	926
SNP	Shahnawaz Khan	34.8	586	586	593	600	633	
Reform UK	Duncan McMillan	15.5	263	268	276	321		
Conservative	Aimee Alexander	7.5	127	127	141			
Liberal Democrats	John Cole	5.0	83	84				
UKIP	Neil Wilson	0.6	11					
Electorate: 10,813 Valid: 1,686 Spoilt: 27 Quota: 844 Turnout: 15.8%

=== 2022 election ===
Mossend and Holytown – 3 seats
Party	Candidate	FPv%	Count					
Party	Candidate	FPv%	1	2	3	4	5	6
Labour	Frank McNally (incumbent)	29.8	1,132					
SNP	Beth Baudo	25.7	974					
SNP	Michael Clarkson	16.9	642	650	672	763	782	
Conservative	Sheila Cameron	12.8	486	496	497	512		
Labour	Jim Reddin (incumbent)	9.6	364	512	512	544	818	1,095
Alba	John Marshall	5.2	198	199	200			
Electorate: 10,343 Valid: 3,796 Spoilt: 152 Quota: 950 Turnout: 38.2%

=== 2017 election ===
Mossend and Holytown - 3 seats
Party	Candidate	FPv%	Count				
Party	Candidate	FPv%	1	2	3	4	5
Labour	Frank McNally (incumbent)	30.41	1,131				
SNP	David Baird (incumbent)	28.56	1,062				
Conservative	Carol Cunningham	17.19	641	649	651	701	
SNP	Michael Clarkson	12.26	456	465	586		
Labour	Jim Reddin	11.54	429	597	599	810	1,179
Electorate: 9,665 Valid: 3,719 Spoilt: 147 Quota: 930 Turnout: 3,866 (40.0%)

- On 10 July 2018, councillor David Baird was suspended from The SNP for 'breaking procedure'. He then sat as an Independent, before re-joining the party in 2018.

=== 2012 election ===
Mossend and Holytown - 3 seats
Party	Candidate	FPv%	Count				
Party	Candidate	FPv%	1	2	3	4	5
Labour	James Coyle (incumbent)	37.9%	1,281				
Labour	Frank McNally	22.0%	745	1,061.5			
SNP	David Baird	17.1%	578	602.4	621.8	642.4	944.3
SNP	Paul Delaney (incumbent)	10.2%	346	362.3	380.2	389.8	
Independent	Kevin McKeown (incumbent)	8.6%	291	310.4	358.7	417.1	449.9
Conservative	Rosemary Pawson	4.2%	141	147.5			
Electorate: 10,020 Valid: 3,382 Spoilt: 77 Quota: 846 Turnout: 3,459 (34.52%)

=== 2007 election ===
North Lanarkshire council election, 2007: Mossend & Holytown
Party	Candidate	FPv%	%	Seat	Count
Labour	James Coyle	1,680	37.3	1	1
SNP	Paul Delaney	1,365	30.3	1	1
Labour	Kevin McKeown	886	19.7	1	2
Conservative	Elizabeth McLeod	386	8.6		
Independent	Jim Reddin	191	4.2		
