= Hue and Cry discography =

- Studio albums: 13
- Soundtrack albums: 5
- Live albums: 4
- Compilation albums: 4
- Singles: 22
- Video albums: 2
- Music videos: 14

The following is a comprehensive discography of the Scottish pop duo Hue and Cry.

== Albums ==
=== Studio albums ===
Year	Album	Peak positions		Certifications
Year	Album	UK	SCO	Certifications
1987	Seduced and Abandoned	22	—	BPI: Silver
1988	Remote	10	—	BPI: Gold
1991	Stars Crash Down	10	—	
1992	Truth and Love	33	—	
1994	Showtime!	—	—	
1995	Piano & Voice	—	—	
1996	JazzNotJazz	—	—	
1999	Next Move	—	—	
2008	Open Soul	—	42	
2009	Xmasday	—	—	
2012	Hot Wire	—	—	
2014	Remote: Major to Minor	—	—	
2015	September Songs	—	—	
2017	Pocketful of Stones	—	—	
2024	Hue And Cry 40	—	—	
2026	Everybody	—	—	
"—" denotes releases that did not chart.

=== Live albums ===
Year	Title
1989	Bitter Suite
1999	Live '99
2010	Bitter Suite, Again
2011	Glasgow Kiss Live Weekend

=== Compilation albums ===
Year	Title	UK
1993	Labours of Love – The Best of Hue and Cry	27
1995	The Best of Hue and Cry	—
2009	The Collection	—
2012	A's & B's	—
"—" denotes releases that did not chart.

== Singles & EPs ==
Year	Single	Peak positions			Album
Year	Single	UK	IRE	NED	Album
1986	"Here Comes Everybody"	—	—	—	Non-album single
1986	"I Refuse"	85	—	—	Seduced and Abandoned
1987	"Labour of Love"	6	6	68	Seduced and Abandoned
1987	"Strength to Strength"	46	27	—	Seduced and Abandoned
1988	"I Refuse" (reissue)	47	—	—	Seduced and Abandoned
1988	"Ordinary Angel"	42	—	—	Remote
1989	"Looking for Linda"	15	—	—	Remote
1989	Violently EP	21	—	—	Remote
1989	"Sweet Invisibility"	55	—	—	Remote
1989	"Peaceful Face"	83	—	—	Non-album single
1991	"My Salt Heart"	47	—	—	Stars Crash Down
1991	Long Term Lovers of Pain EP	48	—	—	Stars Crash Down
1991	"She Makes a Sound"	84	—	—	Stars Crash Down
1992	"Profoundly Yours"	74	—	—	Truth and Love
1993	"Labour of Love" (remix)	25	22	—	Labours of Love - The Best of Hue and Cry
1994	"Just Say You Love Me"	99	—	—	Showtime!
1994	"Cynical"	—	—	—	Showtime!
1996	"All True Man"	—	—	—	JazzNotJazz
2008	"The Last Stop"	—	—	—	Open Soul
2009	"Fireball"	—	—	—	Open Soul
2009	"Headin' for a Fall"	—	—	—	Open Soul
2009	"Players of Games" / "Two Little Boys"	—	—	—	Xmasday
2012	"Duty to the Debtor"	—	—	—	Hot Wire
"—" denotes releases that did not chart or were not released.

== Video ==
=== Releases ===
Year	Title
1989	Whipping Up a Storm
1989	Bitter Suite
2010	Bitter Suite, Again

== Music videos ==
- "I Refuse" [Route 88 version]
- "I Refuse" [Bitter Suite version]
- "Labour of Love"
- "Strength to Strength"
- "Violently (Your Words Hit Me)"
- "Sweet Invisibility"
- "Ordinary Angel"
- "Looking for Linda"
- "She Makes a Sound"
- "Long Term Lovers of Pain"
- "Fireball"
- "The Last Stop"
- "Headin' for a Fall"
- "Duty to the Debtor"
