= Labours of Love – The Best of Hue and Cry =

Greatest hits album by Hue and Cry
- Released: 1993
- Label: Circa
- Producer: Harvey Jay Goldberg; James Biondolillo; Greg Kane

Hue and Cry chronology
Truth and Love (1992)	Labours of Love – The Best of Hue and Cry (1993)	Showtime! (1994)

Labours of Love – The Best of Hue and Cry is a greatest hits album by Scottish pop duo Hue and Cry, released in 1993 by Circa Records. It contains material from the duo's first three studio albums—Seduced and Abandoned (1987), Remote (1988) and Stars Crash Down (1991)—including UK top 40 singles "Labour of Love", "Looking for Linda" and "Violently", alongside live recordings—from the live album Bitter Suite (1989)—and a remix of "Labour of Love" which was released as a single prior to the album's release, reaching number 25. No tracks are included from the duo's fourth album, Truth and Love (1992).

== Track listing ==
All tracks written by Gregory Kane and Patrick Kane, except where noted.

No.	Title	Writer(s)	Origin	Length
1.	"Labour of Love"		Seduced and Abandoned	3:32
2.	"I Refuse"		Seduced and Abandoned	3:32
3.	"Sweet Invisibilty"		Remote	4:28
4.	"Looking for Linda"		Remote	3:48
5.	"My Salt Heart"		Stars Crash Down	3:21
6.	"Violently (Your Words Hit Me)"		Remote	4:04
7.	"Strength to Strength"		Seduced and Abandoned	4:26
8.	"Ordinary Angel"		Remote	4:26
9.	"Long Term Lovers of Pain"		Stars Crash Down	3:38
10.	"She Makes a Sound"		Stars Crash Down	5:44
11.	"Widescreen"		Bitter Suite	3:45
12.	"Stars Crash Down"		Stars Crash Down	4:26
13.	"Peaceful Face" (live)		Bitter Suite	3:47
14.	"The Man with the Child in His Eyes" (live)	Kate Bush	Bitter Suite	3:11
15.	"Truth" (live)		Bitter Suite / Seduced and Abandoned (original studio version)	6:31
16.	"Labour of Love" (7" Urban Edit)		new track	3:38

== Charts ==
Chart (1993)	Peak position
UK Albums (OCC)	27
