= Coatbridge =

Town in North Lanarkshire, Scotland

Coordinates: 55.8625°N 4.0266°W

Coatbridge: Scots: Cotbrig or Coatbrig
- Town
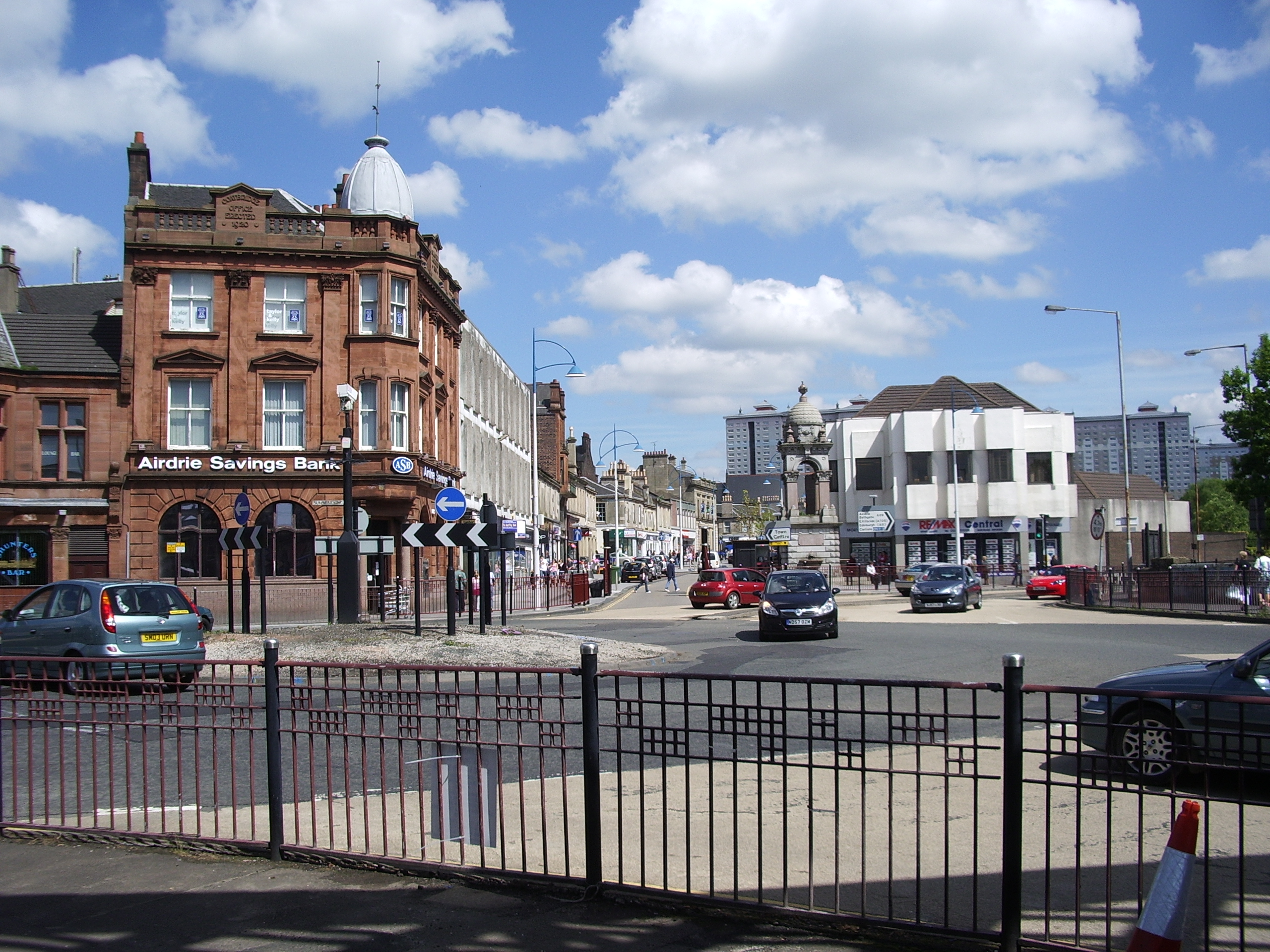
- The Fountain at Bank Street

- Location within North Lanarkshire
- Area: 6.818 sq mi (17.66 km^{2})
- Population: 42,264 (2022)
  - Density: 6,038/sq mi (2,331/km^{2})
- OS grid reference: NS730651
  - Edinburgh: 33 mi (53 km) ENE
  - London: 341 mi (549 km) SSE
- Council area: North Lanarkshire
- Lieutenancy area: Lanarkshire
- Country: Scotland
- Sovereign state: United Kingdom
- Post town: Coatbridge
- Postcode district: ML5
- Dialling code: 01236
- Police: Scotland
- Fire: Scottish
- Ambulance: Scottish
- UK Parliament: Coatbridge and Bellshill
- Scottish Parliament: Coatbridge and Chryston

Coatbridge (/ˌkoʊtˈbrɪdʒ/; Scots: Cotbrig or Coatbrig) is a town in North Lanarkshire, Scotland. It lies 8 1/2 mi (14 km) east of Glasgow city centre, set in the central Lowlands. It had a population of 42,264 in 2022. Along with neighbouring town Airdrie, Coatbridge forms the area known as the Monklands; its population is approximately 90,000, including outlying settlements, and is sometimes considered to be part of the Greater Glasgow urban area.

In the last years of the 18th century, the area developed from a loose collection of hamlets into the town of Coatbridge. The town's development and growth have been intimately connected with the technological advances of the Industrial Revolution, and in particular with the hot blast process. Coatbridge was a major Scottish centre for iron works and coal mining during the 19th century and was then described as "the industrial heartland of Scotland" and the Iron Burgh.

Coatbridge also had a notorious reputation for air pollution and the worst excesses of industry. However, by the 1920s, coal seams were exhausted and the iron industry in Coatbridge was in rapid decline. After the Great Depression, the Gartsherrie ironwork was the last remaining iron works in the town. One publication has commented that in modern-day Coatbridge "coal, iron and steel have all been consigned to the heritage scrap heap."

== History ==
Coatbridge owes its name to a bridge that carried the old Edinburgh-Glasgow road over the Gartsherrie Burn, at what is now Coatbridge Cross. This first appears on Roy's survey of 1755 as Cottbrig, one of a number of places on the wider Coats estate. The name Coats most likely comes from the Scots word cot(t), meaning "cottage", although an alternative theory links it to the name of the Colt family, who owned land here as early as the 13th century.

=== Early history: Bronze to Middle Ages ===
Settlement of the Coatbridge area dates back 3,000 years to the Mesolithic Age. A circle of Bronze Age stone coffins was found on the Drumpellier estate in 1852. A number of other Bronze Age urns and relics have been found in Coatbridge. An Iron Age wood and thatch crannog dwelling was sited in the loch at the present day Drumpellier Country Park. Dependent upon the water level in the loch, the remains can still be seen.

Roman coins have been unearthed in Coatbridge and there are the remains of a Roman road on the fringes of the town near the M8 motorway.

=== Middle Ages to late 18th century ===
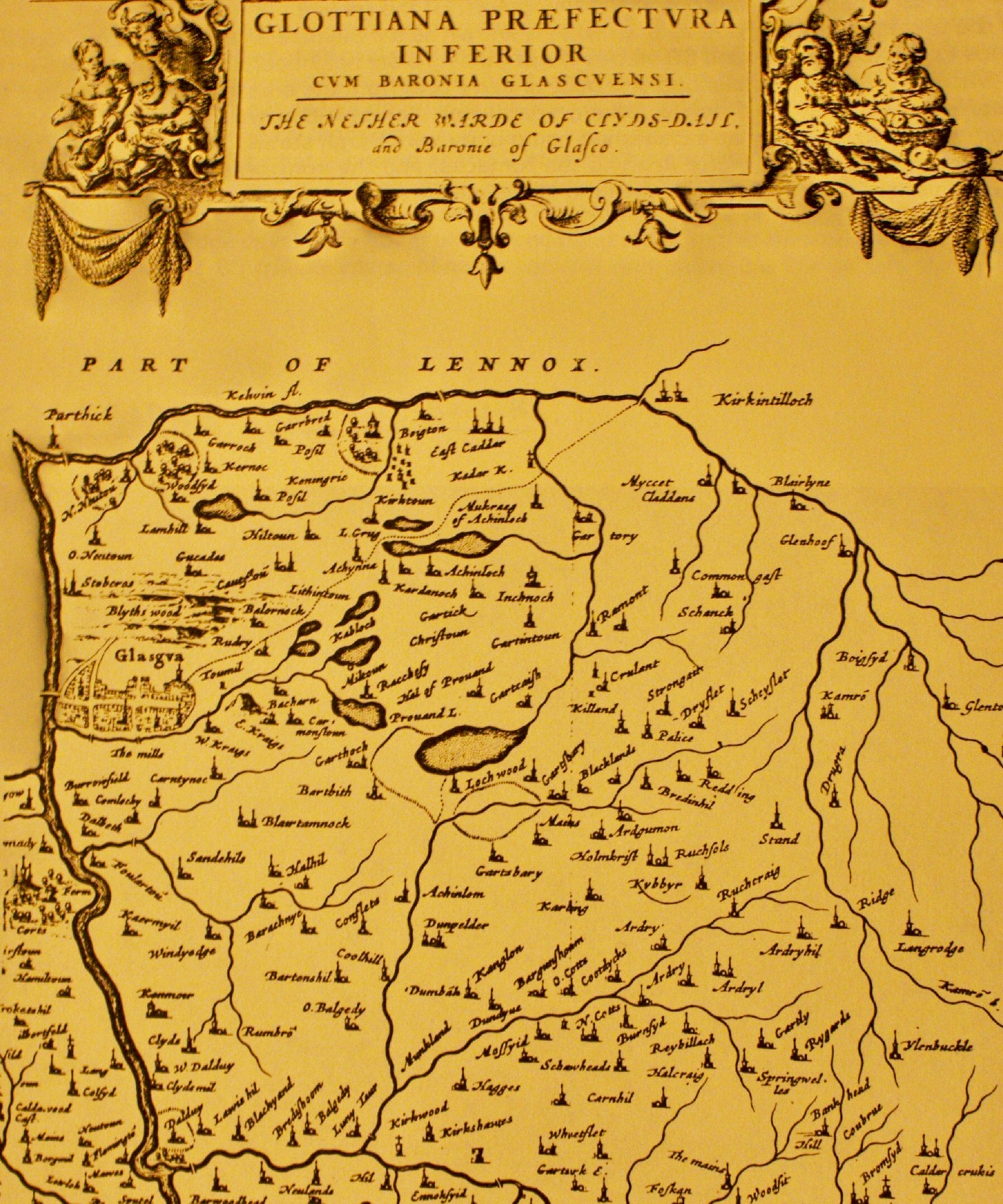
Pont's "Nether Warde of Clyds-dail" map c. 1654, which depicts the hamlets of Kirkwood, Dunpelder, Wheatflet, Dunbath, Gartshary in the modern day Coatbridge area

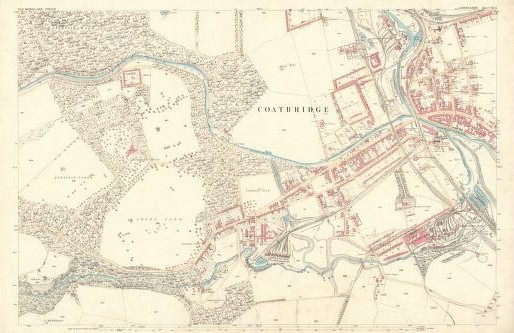
Map of the Coatbridge area (1858)

The Monklands area inherited its name after the area was granted to the Cistercian monks of Newbattle Abbey by King Malcolm IV in 1162. In 1323, the Monklands name appeared for the first time on Stewards' charter. The monks mined coal and farmed the land until the time of the reformation when the land was taken from them and given to private landowners. In 1641, the parish of Monklands was divided between New Monkland (present day Airdrie) and Old Monkland (present day Coatbridge). Old Monkland was described in the 1799 Statistical Account as an "immense garden" with "extensive orchards" and "luxurious crops", where "rivers abound with salmon."

=== 19th century ===
The Monkland Canal was constructed at the end of the 18th century initially to transport coal to Glasgow from the rich local deposits. The invention of the hot blast furnace process in 1828 meant that Coatbridge's ironstone deposits could be exploited to the maximum by the canal link and hot blast process. The new advances meant that iron could be produced with two-thirds less fuel. Summerlee Iron Works was one of the first iron works to use this technology. By the mid 19th century, there were numerous hot blast furnaces in operation in Coatbridge.

The prosperous industry which had sprung up around the new iron industry required vast numbers of largely unskilled workers to mine ironstone and work in the blast furnace plants. Coatbridge therefore became a popular destination for vast numbers of Irish people arriving in Scotland. The iron bars and plates produced in Coatbridge iron works were the raw materials needed throughout the British Empire for railways, construction, bridge building and shipbuilding. One example of uses Coatbridge iron was put to included armour plating for British ships fighting in the Crimean War.

Over the course of the following 40 years, the population of Coatbridge grew by 600%. The character of the Coatbridge area changed from a rural, Presbyterian landscape of small hamlets and farmhouses into a crowded, polluted, Irish Catholic industrial town. In 1840, Rev William Park wrote that:

"The population of this parish is at present advancing at an amazing rate, and this propensity is entirely owing to the local coal and iron trade, stimulated by the discovery of the black band of ironstone and the method of fusing iron by hot blast. New villages are springing up almost every month, and it is impossible to keep place with the march of prosperity and the increase of the population."

One contemporary observer at this time noted that Coatbridge is "not famous for its sylvan beauties of its charming scenery" and "offers the visitor no inducements to loiter long". However, "a visit to the large Gartsherrie works is one of the sights of a lifetime."

Most of the town's population lived in tight rows of terraced houses built under the shadow of the iron works. These homes were often owned by their employers. Living conditions for most were appalling and tuberculosis was rife.

For a fortunate few though, fortunes could be won "with a rapidity only equalled by the princely gains of some of the adventurers who accompanied Pizarro to Peru", noted one observer. Among the most notable success stories were the six sons of Coatbridge farmer Alexander Baird. The Baird family had become involved in coal mining but opened an iron foundry in order to exploit the new hot blast process of iron smelting invented by James Beaumont Neilson. The Bairds subsequently constructed numerous iron foundries in Coatbridge including the famous Gartsherrie iron works. The waste heap or 'bing' from the Baird's Gartsherrie works was said to be as large as the great pyramid in Egypt. One son, James Baird, was responsible for erecting 16 blast-furnaces in Coatbridge between 1830 and 1842. Each of the six sons of Alexander Baird was reputed to have become a millionaire.

The town was vividly described by Robert Baird in 1845:

"There is no worse place out of hell than that neighbourhood. At night the groups of blast furnaces on all sides might be imagined to be blazing volcanoes at most of which smelting is continued on Sundays and weekdays, day and night, without intermission. From the town comes a continual row of heavy machinery: this and the pounding of many steam hammers seemed to make even the very ground vibrate under ones feet. Fire, smoke and soot with the roar and rattle of machinery are its leading characteristics; the flames of its furnaces cast on the midnight sky a glow as if of some vast conflagration. Dense clouds of black smoke roll over it incessantly and impart to all buildings a peculiarly dingy aspect. A coat of black dust overlies everything."

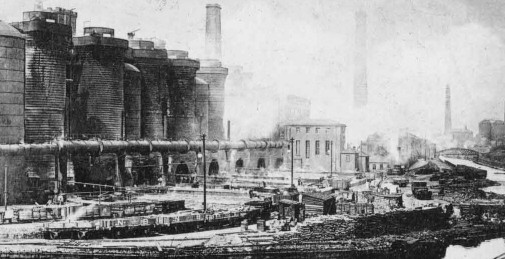
Summerlee blast furnaces at the start of the 20th century Coatbridge. The present day Summerlee Museum of Scottish Industrial Life is sited here.

In the 19th century, the Baird family wielded a pervasive influence over Coatbridge. They were responsible for the design of the lay out of present-day Coatbridge town centre. The land for the Town Hall and the land which later came to form Dunbeth Park was given to the town by the Bairds. Gartsherrie church was built by the Baird family, the oldest and most significant landmark in the town. Despite being Protestant, the Bairds donated the site on the Main Street for the erection of St Patrick's Catholic Church.

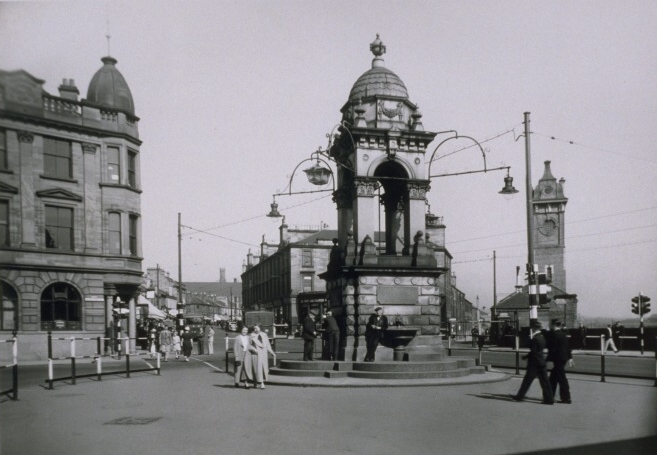
The Whitelaw Fountain in Coatbridge during the 1930s

Daniel (Dane) Sinclair, an engineer with the National Telephone Company based in Glasgow, patented the automatic telephone switchboard. This system was installed in Coatbridge in 1886 and became the world's first automatic telephone exchange.

=== 20th and 21st centuries ===
By 1885, the once plentiful Monklands ironstone deposits had been largely exhausted. It became increasingly expensive to produce iron in Coatbridge as raw materials had to be imported from as far afield as Spain. The growth of the steel industry in nearby Motherwell had also led to a start of a decline in demand for the pig iron Coatbridge produced. Living conditions remained grim. In the 1920s, Lloyd George's "Coal and Power" report described the living conditions in the Rosehall area of Coatbridge:

"...on the outskirts of Coatbridge, I found nearly the worst of all. In each of these single rooms lives a miner's family. There is no pantry. The coal is kept under the bed. Water has to be obtained from a standpipe outside, used by a number of houses. Conspicuously huddled together in the yards are filthy huts for sanitary purposes."

George Orwell's book The Road to Wigan Pier was illustrated by a photograph of homes in the Rosehall area of Coatbridge. In 1934, there was an exodus to Corby, in England, when the local union plant relocated; this had the effect of a hammer blow impact on the town's iron industry and ushered in the end of serious iron production. The decline of the Clydeside shipbuilding industry in the 1950s meant the demand for iron finally collapsed. A legacy of "devastating" unemployment, appalling housing conditions and some of the worst overcrowding in Scotland left its stamp on the Coatbridge of the early 1930s. As late as 1936, Coatbridge was the most overcrowded place in Scotland.

In the 1930s and 1950s, however, massive state-sponsored programmes saw thousands of new homes built in Coatbridge and some of the worst examples of slum housing were cleared away. By the early 1980s, 85% of homes in Coatbridge were part of local authority housing stock.

The last of the blast furnaces, William Baird's Gartsherrie works, was closed in 1967.

Since the 1970s, there have been various initiatives to attempt to regenerate Coatbridge. Urban Aid grants, European Union grants and, more recently, Social Inclusion Partnerships have attempted to breathe new life into Coatbridge. Despite these efforts the town's population has continued to fall and, in recent years, the town has been dubbed the "most dismal in Scotland."

== Geography ==
Coatbridge is situated in Scotland's Central Lowlands. The town lies 288 feet (88 m) above sea level, 9 miles (14.5 km) east of Glasgow, 6 miles (10 km) south of Cumbernauld and 2 miles (3 km) west of Airdrie. Although Coatbridge has no major river running through it, the North Calder Water runs east–west to the south and the former Monkland Canal used to run straight through the centre of the town toward Glasgow. The canal route through Coatbridge can still be seen today. Several smaller burns run through Coatbridge, most of which drain into the North Calder Water. Coatbridge has four significant public parks: Dunbeth Park, West End Park, Whifflet Park and Drumpellier Country Park. Lochend Loch (known locally as Drumpellier Loch) and Woodend Loch are situated on the north-west edge of the town.

=== Topography ===
The topography of Coatbridge was an important feature in the town's development during the Industrial Revolution. Coatbridge rests 197 feet (60 m) below the "Slamannan plateau" and neighbouring Airdrie sits on its edge. The low-lying flat ground of Coatbridge was a vital factor in the siting of the town's blast furnaces and the Monkland Canal route. Although Airdrie was an already established town and had local supplies of ironstone, the Monkland Canal link did not extend into Airdrie because of its higher elevation. The Clyde Valley plan of 1949 described Coatbridge as "situated over a flooded coalfield." Tenement buildings in Coatbridge were not built to the same level as Glasgow tenements due to danger of local subsidence from centuries of local mining.

=== Geology ===
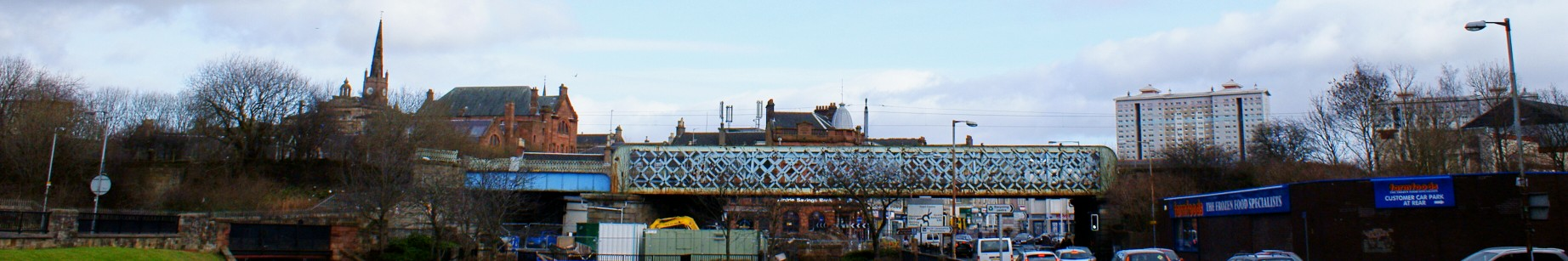
View of Coatbridge from the east. Landmarks from left to right are: Gartsherrie Academy, Gartsherrie Church, Coatbridge Library, Canal Bridge, High Coats & Dunbeth Court flats. Whitelaw Fountain can just be seen under the Canal Bridge.

Dunbeth Hill where the present local authority municipal buildings stand is a wedge of rock which was probably squeezed upwards by the force of two (now-extinct) fault lines. There are the remains of spreads of glacial sands along the crest of Drumpellier, the west bank of Gartsherrie Burn and along modern day Bank Street. Kirkwood, Kirkshaws and Shawhead sit on a sandstone capped ridge looking south over the Clyde Valley. The vital Coatbridge black band coal field extended from Langloan to beyond the eastern edge of the town.

It was noted in the early 20th century that "The cross at Coatbridge ranks among the most unique...one may pass through it in any form of locomotion. One can not only walk, ride or drive past it, but may train over it or sail under it by means of the canal."

=== Climate ===
Like much of the British Isles, Coatbridge experiences a temperate maritime climate, with relatively cool summers and mild winters. The prevailing wind is from the west. Regular, but generally light, precipitation occurs throughout the year.

=== Neighbourhoods ===
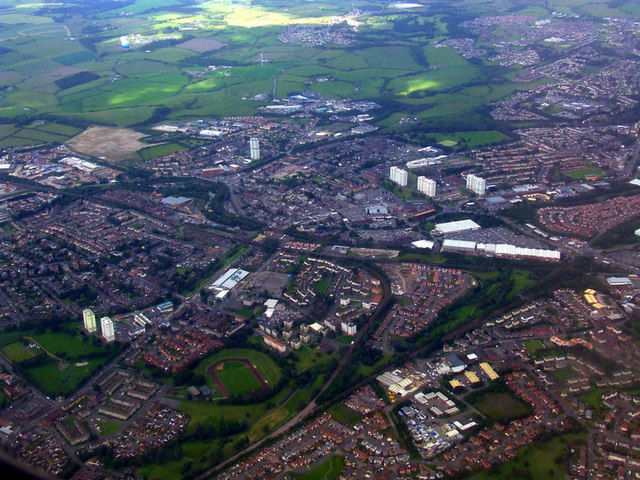
Aerial view of Coatbridge (2011) including the Langloan and Dundyvan areas (left/bottom) and the town centre (right/centre)

The earliest map showing Coatbridge is by Timothy Pont, published in Johan Blaeu's Nether warde of Clyds-dail (1654). The districts of Dunpelder (Drumpellier), Gartsbary (Gartsherrie), Kanglon (Langloan), Kirkwood, Kirkshawes (Kirkshaws) and Wheetflet (Whifflet) are all evident.

The present day neighbourhoods of Coatbridge are Barrowfield, Blairhill, Brownshill, Carnbroe, Cliftonhill, Cliftonville, Coatbank, Coatdyke, Cuparhead, Drumpellier, Dunbeth, Dundyvan, Espieside, Gartsherrie, Greenhill, Greenend, Kirkshaws, Kirkwood, Langloan, Old Monkland, Rosehall, Shawhead, Sikeside, Summerlee, Sunnyside, Townhead and Whifflet. The Blairhill and Dunbeth neighbourhoods are part of a self-named conservation area.

The Whitelaw Fountain is named in honour of Alexander Whitelaw, an industrialist and MP; it is situated in the town centre, on the corner of Main Street and South Circular Road, but was formerly about 55 yards (50 m) west, at what is now the centre of a roundabout.

=== Demography ===
Coatbridge compared according to the UK census 2001
	Coatbridge	North Lanarkshire	Scotland
Total population	41,170	321,067	5,062,011
Foreign born	1.3%	1.7%	3.8%
Over 75 years old	6.1%	5.6%	7.1%
Unemployed	5.3%	4.5%	4.0%

According to the 2022 Scottish census, the census locality of Coatbridge had a total resident population of 42,624. In 2001, it was around 13% of the total of North Lanarkshire, which the figure, combined with an area of 6.818 sq mi (17.7 km^{2}) (Note: See: List of census localities in Scotland: North Lanarkshire.) provides Coatbridge with a population density figure of 6,038/sq mi (2,331/km^{2}).

Historic population of Coatbridge
Year	Population
1755	1,813
1831	9,580
1851	27,333
1901	36,991
1911	43,286
1921	43,909
1931	43,056
1951	47,685
1961	54,262
1971	51,493
1981	48,445
2001	41,170
2011	43,841
2022	42,264

The median ages of males and females living in Coatbridge were 35 and 38 years respectively, compared to 37 and 39 years in the whole of Scotland. 34% were married, 6.1% were co-habiting couples, 14.7% were single parent families and 32.5% of households were made up of individuals.

The place of birth of the town's residents was as follows: 98.7% United Kingdom (including 96% from Scotland), 0.32% Republic of Ireland, 0.30% from other European Union countries and 0.72% from elsewhere in the world. The economic activity of residents aged 16–74 was 39.3% in full-time employment, 9.4% in part-time employment, 3.6% self-employed, 5.3% unemployed, 2.5% students with jobs, 3.2% students without jobs, 13.4% retired, 5.7% looking after home or family, 12.0% permanently sick or disabled and 5.7% economically inactive for other reasons. Compared with the average demographics of Scotland, Coatbridge has low proportions of people born outside the United Kingdom and people over 75.

During the 19th century, Irish people began to arrive in large numbers in Coatbridge; the 1851 UK census recorded that they constituted 35.8% of the local population. A significant proportion of these immigrants were Protestant, but the majority were Catholic. By the 1901 UK census, the percentage of Irish-born people in Coatbridge had fallen to around 15%, but remained the highest of all the major towns in Scotland. In the 2001 UK census, Irish ethnicity was recorded at just over 1%, although just over half the population claimed their religious denomination as Roman Catholicism; in 1985, this constituted 56% of the population.

In 2006, Coatbridge, along with Port Glasgow and Clydebank, was identified as "the least Scottish town in Scotland" due to having the highest percentage of Irish names in the country. Reportedly more than 28% of adults in Coatbridge had names with Irish origins.

Other immigrants to Coatbridge have included a small number of Lithuanians in the 1880s. In 1905, part of a "wave" of immigrants from Monte Cassino in Italy settled in Coatbridge. A small number of Polish people had stayed in Coatbridge, after a Polish tank regiment was stationed in the town during World War II.

== Governance ==
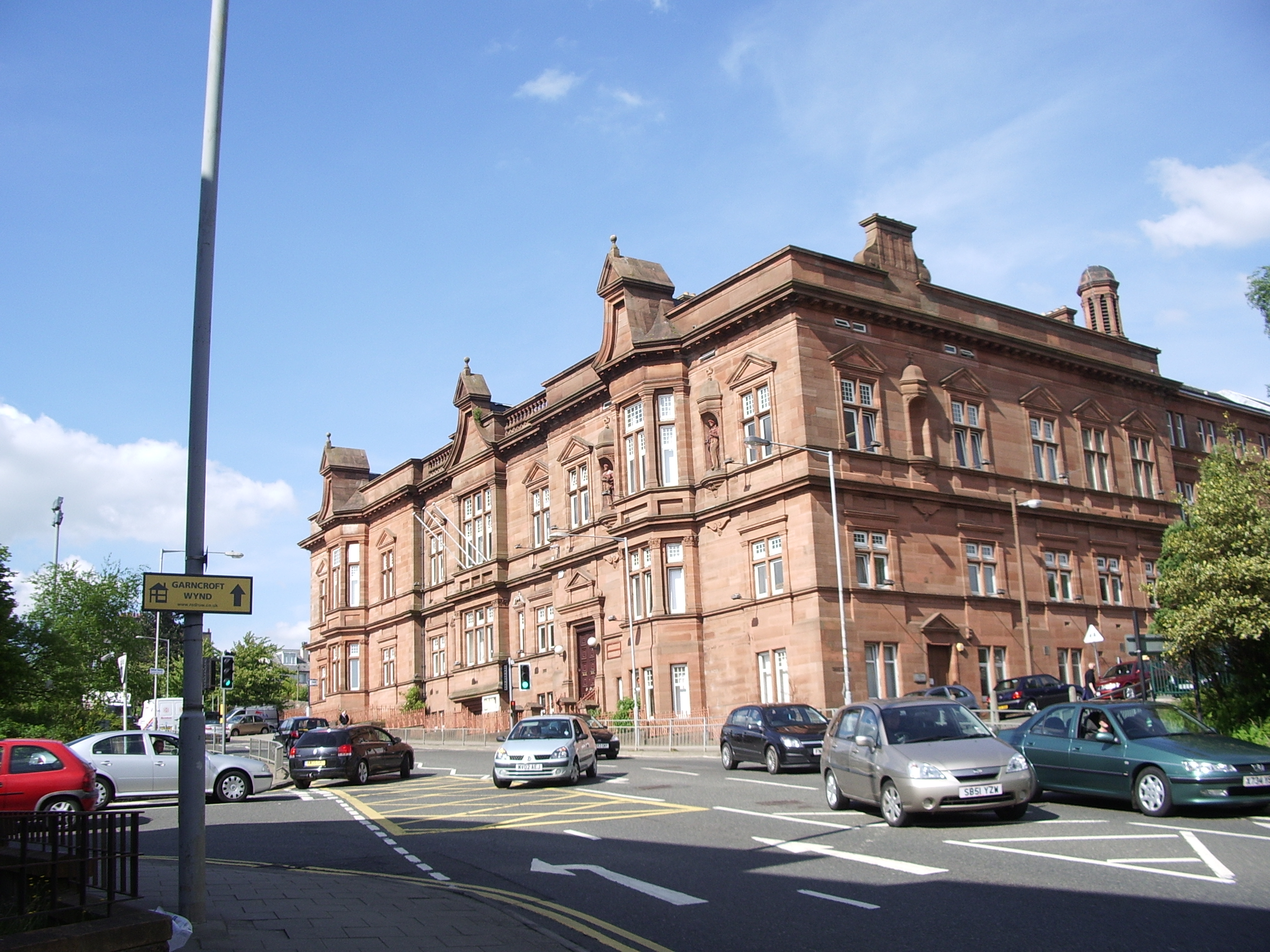
Coatbridge Municipal Buildings

=== National ===
Coatbridge is presently part of the burgh constituency of Coatbridge, Chryston and Bellshill, electing one MP to the House of Commons of the UK Parliament. Before the constituency's creation in 2005, Coatbridge lay in the Coatbridge and Chryston constituency. Frank McNally of the Labour Party has been MP since the 2024 General Election. For the purposes of the Scottish Parliament, Coatbridge forms part of the Coatbridge and Cryston constituency, which is represented by Fulton MacGregor of the Scottish National Party (SNP). Coatbridge is further represented by seven regional MSPs from the Central Scotland electoral region. A small part of the eastern fringes of the town forms part of the Airdrie and Shotts constituency, which is represented by Alex Neil in the Scottish Parliament and Neil Gray in the UK Parliament; both represent the SNP.

Notable politicians from Coatbridge include: Baroness Liddell, a former MP, who was formerly both Secretary of State for Scotland and Britain's High Commissioner in Australia, and Lord Reid, also a former MP who was the former Secretary of State for Northern Ireland and Home Secretary; Reid is a former chairman of Celtic.

=== Local ===
Coatbridge is represented by three tiers of elected government. North Lanarkshire Council, the unitary local authority for Coatbridge, is based at Motherwell, and is the executive, deliberative and legislative body responsible for local governance. The Scottish Parliament is responsible for devolved matters such as education, health and justice, while reserved matters are dealt with by the UK Parliament.

Up until 1975, Coatbridge had its own Burgh Council based at Coatbridge Town Hall. Between 1975 and 1996, Coatbridge was part of Monklands District Council and Strathclyde Regional Council. During the campaign for the 1994 by-election in Monklands East of 1994, there were accusations of sectarianism and nepotism in favour of Coatbridge over neighbouring Airdrie by Monklands District Council (see Monklandsgate for more information). The fact that all 17 Labour councillors were Roman Catholic led to Coatbridge being seen as a "Catholic town". Subsequent inquiries showed no evidence of sectarianism, but allegations of nepotism were shown to be true.

==== Wards ====
Since the most recent major reorganisation in 2006, Coatbridge is divided into three wards for local administrative purposes by North Lanarkshire Council, each electing three or four councillors:

- Coatbridge North (2019 population 15,146): Townhead, Greenhill, Sunnyside, Dunbeth, Blairhill, Drumpellier, Clinftonville, town centre
- Coatbridge South (2019 population 16,889): Greenend, Sikeside, Whifflet, Kirkshaws, Shawhead and Carnbroe
- Coatbridge West (2019 population 14,910): Kirkwood, Dundyvan, Langloan, Old Monkland, Barrowfield plus Bargeddie.

== Economy ==
Coatbridge is the site of Scotland's inland container base; it was chosen as the site in part due to the proximity of various rail and motorway networks. Makers of PA systems and loudspeakers Tannoy Ltd. are headquartered in the town. Lees of Scotland is a local confectionery and bakery products company and are the manufacturers of the Lees Macaroon bar, and has been operating in Coatbridge since 1931. William Lawson's Scotch Whisky distillery has been located in the town since 1967. It was home to one of the first B&Q superstores, which was closed in 2006 and moved to the new retail park. The oldest family business in Coatbridge and Airdrie is the funeral director Donald McLaren Ltd, which was founded in 1912.

In terms of housing, property prices in Coatbridge have undergone rapid growth since 2000. In 2005, house prices rose by 35%, reportedly the largest such increase in Scotland.

== Landmarks ==
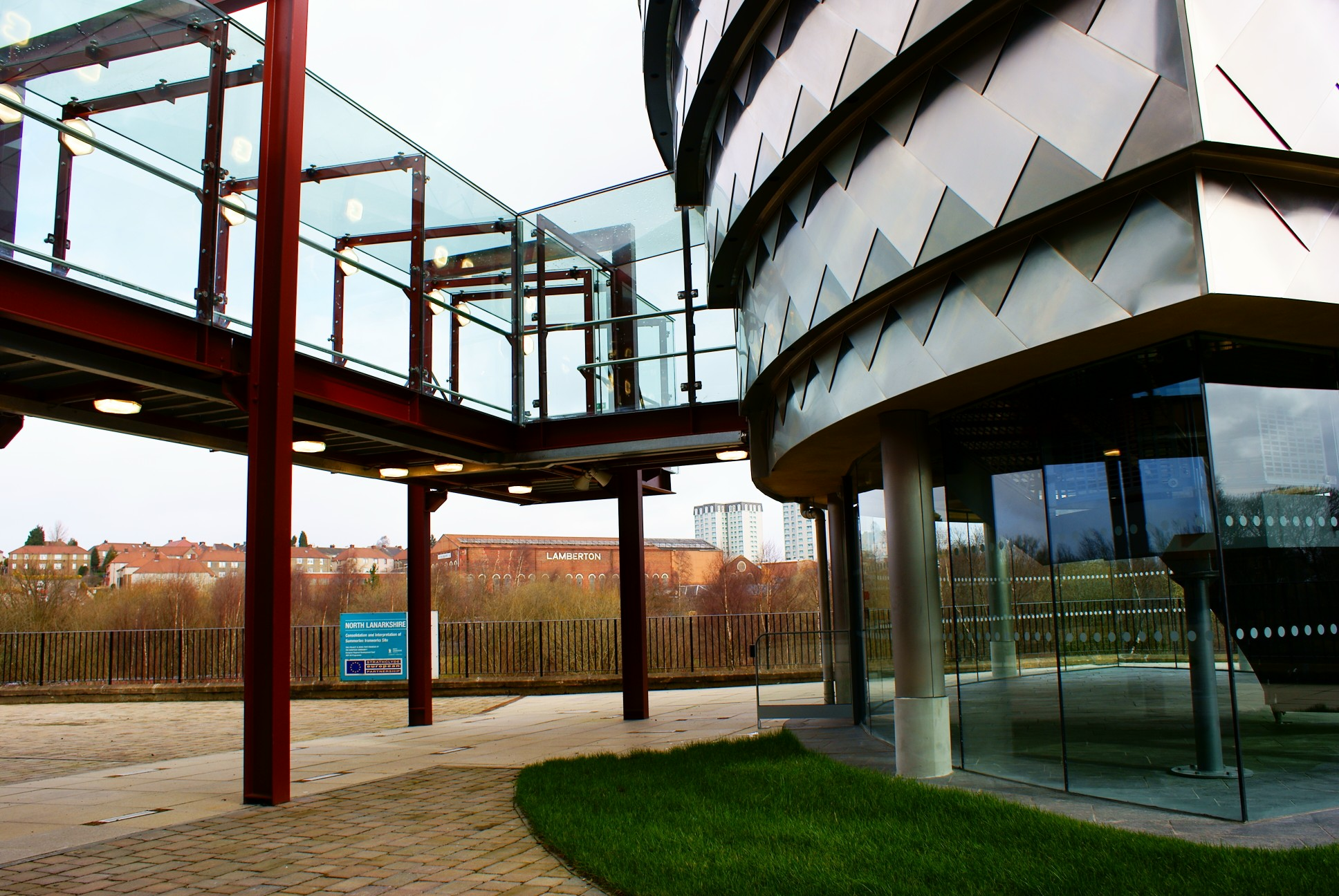
View towards Summerlee Iron Works, Summerlee, Museum of Scottish Industrial Life

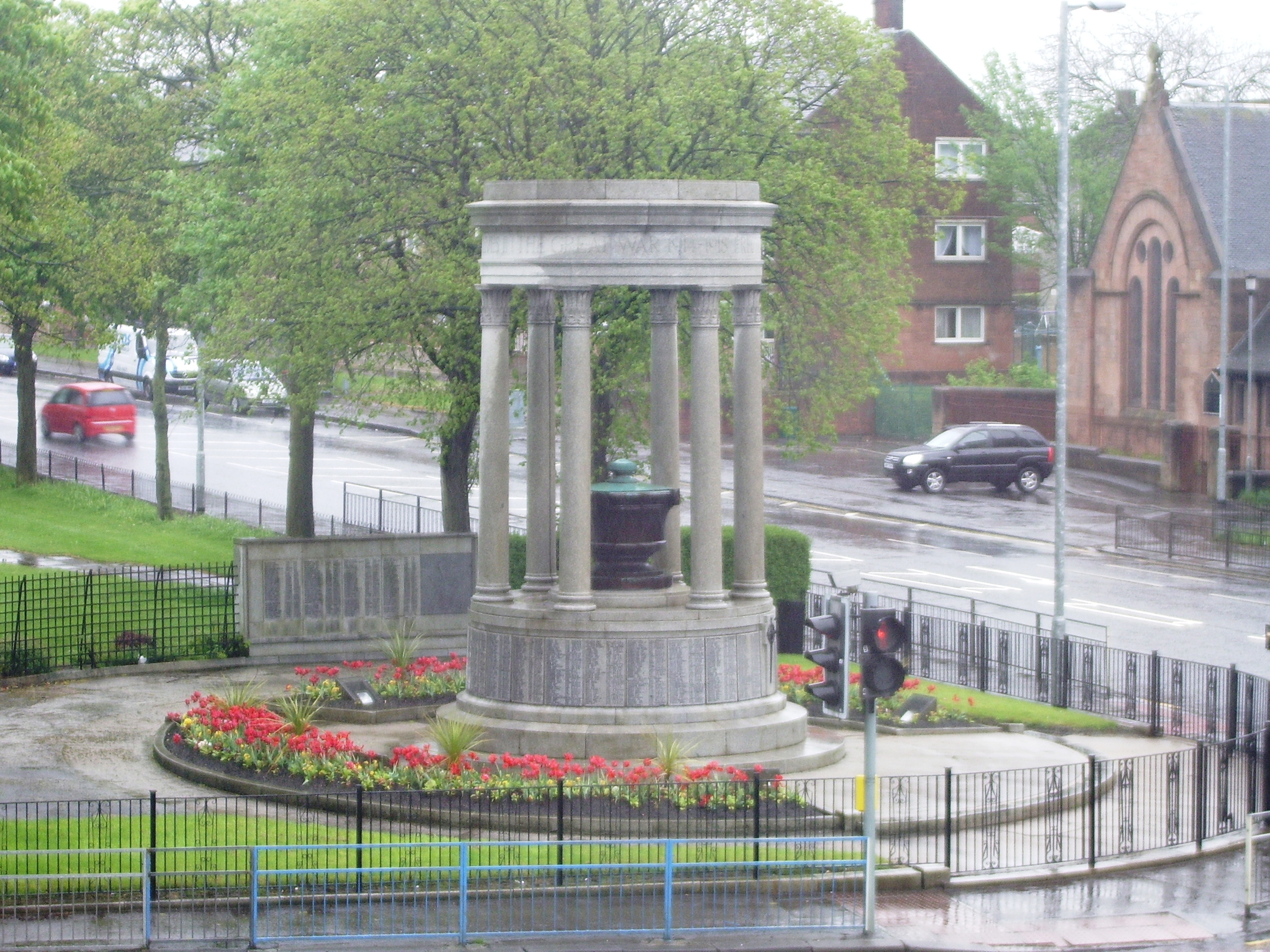
Coatbridge War Memorial

The built environment around Coatbridge's town centre is a mixture of late 19th- and early 20th-century sandstone buildings and late 20th-century precast concrete shops. The leafy Blairhill and Dunbeth conservation areas to the west and north of the town centre comprise detached, semi-detached and terraced sandstone residential buildings. The bulk of the remaining surrounding areas consist of various 20th-century local authority housing buildings. Several high-rise flats dominate the skyline. Due to the decline of industries, several private housing estates have been built on reclaimed land.

In 2007, Coatbridge was awarded Prospect architecture magazine's carbuncle award for being the "most dismal town in Scotland." The town was also described by Scottish comedian Frankie Boyle as "like Bladerunner... without the special effects."

Drumpellier Country Park is set around Lochend Loch (more commonly known to locals as 'Drumpellier Loch'). There are extensive woodlands, a visitor centre and a butterfly house. Monkland Canal runs through a section of the park.

The Time Capsule is a multi-purpose leisure centre containing a swimming pool, an adventure pool set in a prehistoric environment, an ice skating facility, sauna/steam room and a sports complex with gym halls and other facilities. The Showcase Leisure Park contains a 14-screen cinema, a ten-pin bowling complex and several restaurants.

Landmarks in Coatbridge include:

- Coatbridge Leisure Centre – Peter Womersley 1970s brutalist, modernist cantilevered building sited on the main road into Coatbridge
- The former Coatbridge Library, an Andrew Carnegie-sponsored 1905 pink sandstone structure. Imposing B-listed structure sited on Academy Street
- St Augustine's Church and buildings – Built in 1873 and located in the Dundyvan area. A red sandstone B-listed Rowand Anderson Gothic church
- St Andrew's Church – 1839 early Victorian Gothic church by Scott Stephen & Gale in the Whitelaw hill area; its steeple towers over the town centre
- Coatbridge railway bridges – The B-listed 1898 bridges span Bank Street, West Canal Street and the former Monkland Canal. The bridges underwent specialist restoration in 2009
- St Mary's Church – B-listed Gothic church in Whifflet designed by Pugin and Pugin in 1896. Contains an elaborate and ornate interior ceiling
- The former Cattle Market Building – erected in 1896, B-listed façade of the sandstone cattle market building, facing West Canal Street and within the Blairhill and Dunbeth conservation area
- Summerlee Heritage Park 2008 extension – spaceship style glass and metal addition to existing building by North Lanarkshire Council's in-house Design Services Team.

== Education ==
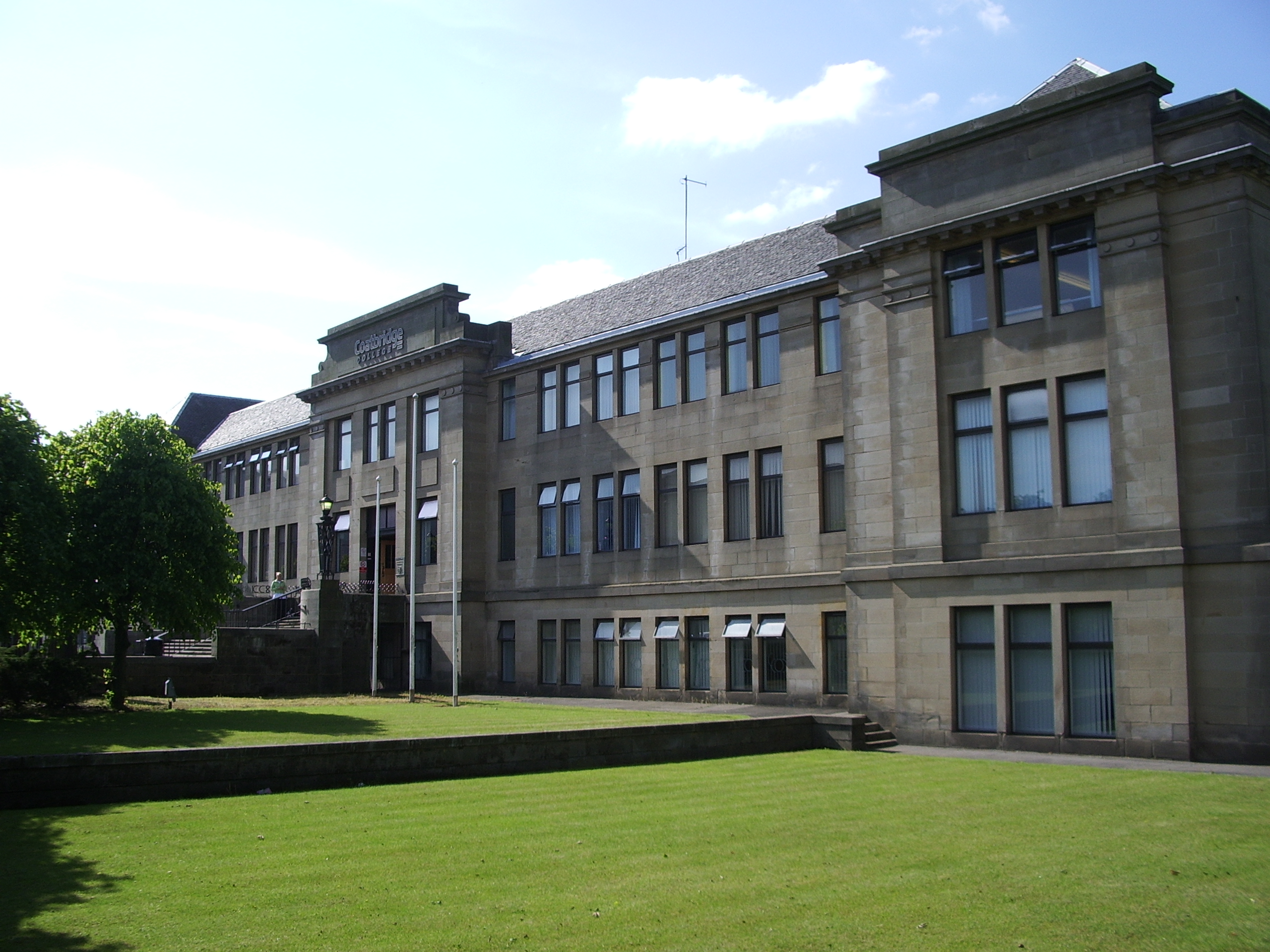
Coatbridge College

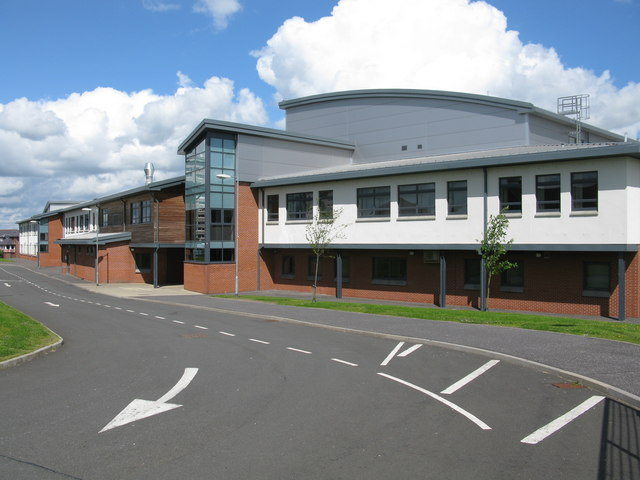
The modern building of Coatbridge High School

Coatbridge College was built as Scotland's first college in the 1860s. As Coatbridge has moved away from the traditional heavy industries the teaching focus has shifted from traditional industry courses towards commerce, care and the arts. After resisting previous mergers, it became a campus of the multi-site New College Lanarkshire in 2014.

The main secondary schools serving the town are:

- St. Ambrose High School: which opened a new building in 2013
- St. Andrew's High School: which opened in 2006 following a merger of the former Columba H.S. and St Patrick's H.S.
- Coatbridge High School: a new building opened in 2008 on the site of St Patrick's previous campus; Coatbridge's old campus is now occupied by Greenhill Primary and Drumpark Primary.

The first two are Roman Catholic; it is one of few places in Scotland where the number of denominational schools is greater than non-denominational. St Ambrose was the subject of a His Majesty's Inspectors (HMI) follow-up assessment visit in January 2009. Sports journalist and broadcaster Bob Crampsey was formerly headmaster of St Ambrose; prominent football referee, Willie Collum, taught religious education at the school in the early 2000s. Rosehall was a former school in the town, whose pupils now typically attend Coatbridge.

The town also has several special needs schools including Pentland School (primary school), Portland High School, Drumpark School (now primary department only), Willowbank School (high school) and Buchanan High School.

== Transport ==
The Strathclyde Partnership for Transport has direct operational responsibilities for local bus services and managing integrated ticketing in the former Strathclyde region. Transport Scotland operates the railway services, under the ScotRail brand.

There are four railway lines that bisect the town; it was once dubbed the "Crewe of the North". ScotRail provides services which can be accessed via six local stations:

- Aygyle and Motherwell-Cumbernauld Lines: from Coatbridge Central and Whifflet, services connect Cumbernauld with Dalmuir, via Motherwell and Glasgow Central
- North Clyde Line: from Blairhill, Coatdyke and Coatbridge Sunnyside, services connect Airdrie with Balloch, and Edinburgh Waverley with Helensburgh Central; both via Glasgow Queen Street.
- Whifflet Line: from Kirkwood, services connect Motherwell with Dalmuir, via Glasgow Central.

Bus services are operated by First Greater Glasgow, Scottish Citylink, ARG Travel, JMB Travel, McNairn's Coaches and United Coaches. Routes connect with town with Airdrie, Caldercruix, Plains, Wishaw, Glasgow and Edinburgh Airport.

Coatbridge is adjacent to the M8 and M73 motorways. The M74 is also a short drive away. The cities of Edinburgh, Stirling and Glasgow are all within commuting distance.

The Monkland Canal was completed in 1791; it was used in the 19th and 20th century to transport coal and iron to Glasgow. The town centre section of the canal was interred in pipe between Sikeside and Blair Road in the mid-1970s. Some sections of the Monkland Canal can still be seen today between Townhead and Drumpellier.

== Public services ==
The following organisations provide the town's public services:

- Coatbridge forms part of the Western water and sewerage regions of Scotland. Waste management is provided by the North Lanarkshire local authority. Water supplies are provided by Scottish Water
- The town's distribution network operator for electricity is Scottish Power
- Coatbridge is served by Monklands Hospital, sited on the Airdrie side of the Coatbridge/Airdrie border, which overseen by NHS Lanarkshire
- Scottish Fire and Rescue Service is the statutory fire and rescue service
- Policing is provided by the Police Service of Scotland (Lanarkshire division).
- The local authority responsible for community-based service in Coatbridge is North Lanarkshire Council
- The council provides local services related to education, social work, the environment, housing, road maintenance and leisure.

== Culture ==
Coatbridge is the home of one of Scotland's most visited museums, Summerlee Museum of Scottish Industrial Life, which contains an insight into the lives of working people in the West of Scotland. A miners' row of 1900s–1980s houses, a working tramway and a reconstruction coal mine can all be experienced on site. The museum is situated on the remains of one of Coatbridge's historic blast furnaces, now a scheduled monument.

Coatbridge is twinned with St. Denis in France, Campi Bisenzio in Italy, and Gatchina in Russia.

=== Literature, theatre and film ===
Janet Hamilton, the 19th century poet and essayist, died in Langloan in 1873. Present-day writers Anne Donovan (Orange prize winner), Brian Conaghan and Des Dillon are all from Coatbridge. The town has featured regularly in Des Dillon's work; two of these books have been turned into plays.

Mark Millar is a Coatbridge comic book writer whose Wanted comic book series has been translated into a feature film, starring Angelina Jolie and Morgan Freeman, as well as the highly successful graphic novel Kickass which was adapted into the successful film of the same name in 2010. Coatbridge-born Laurentia McLachlan was the Benedictine abbess of the Stanbrook Community whose correspondence with George Bernard Shaw and Sydney Cockerell was the subject of the film The Best of Friends.

Coatbridge is also home to the annual Deep Fried Film Festival. Local filmmakers Duncan and Wilma Finnigan have been described by The List as "the John Cassavetes and Gena Rowlands of Coatbridge."

=== Music ===
Thomas McAleese (alias Dean Ford) was the lead singer of The Marmalade, who had a UK number one single in 1969 with a cover of The Beatles' "Ob-La-Di, Ob-La-Da" and co-wrote "Reflections of My Life", Marmalade's biggest worldwide success. Coatbridge brothers Greg Kane and Pat Kane are the band Hue and Cry. Coatbridge born Alan Frew is the ex-pat lead singer of Canadian group Glass Tiger. "My Town" was written by Glass Tiger bandmates Alan Frew, Alan Connelly and Wayne Parker, as well as Jim Cregan, who co-wrote two of Rod Stewart's other hits. The song's lyrics are a tribute to Frew's hometown, Coatbridge, and Stewart was invited to record the song with Glass Tiger because of his Scottish ancestry. Cha Burns (deceased), Jimme O'Neill and JJ Gilmour of The Silencers are from Coatbridge. Coatbridge sisters Fran and Anna were a famous duo on the Scottish traditional music scene. Cousins Ted and Hugh McKenna, of Tear Gas and the Sensational Alex Harvey Band, and Hugh's sister, Mae McKenna, a folk singer and renowned session singer, came from the Kirkshaws area of Coatbridge.

=== Relationship with Ireland ===
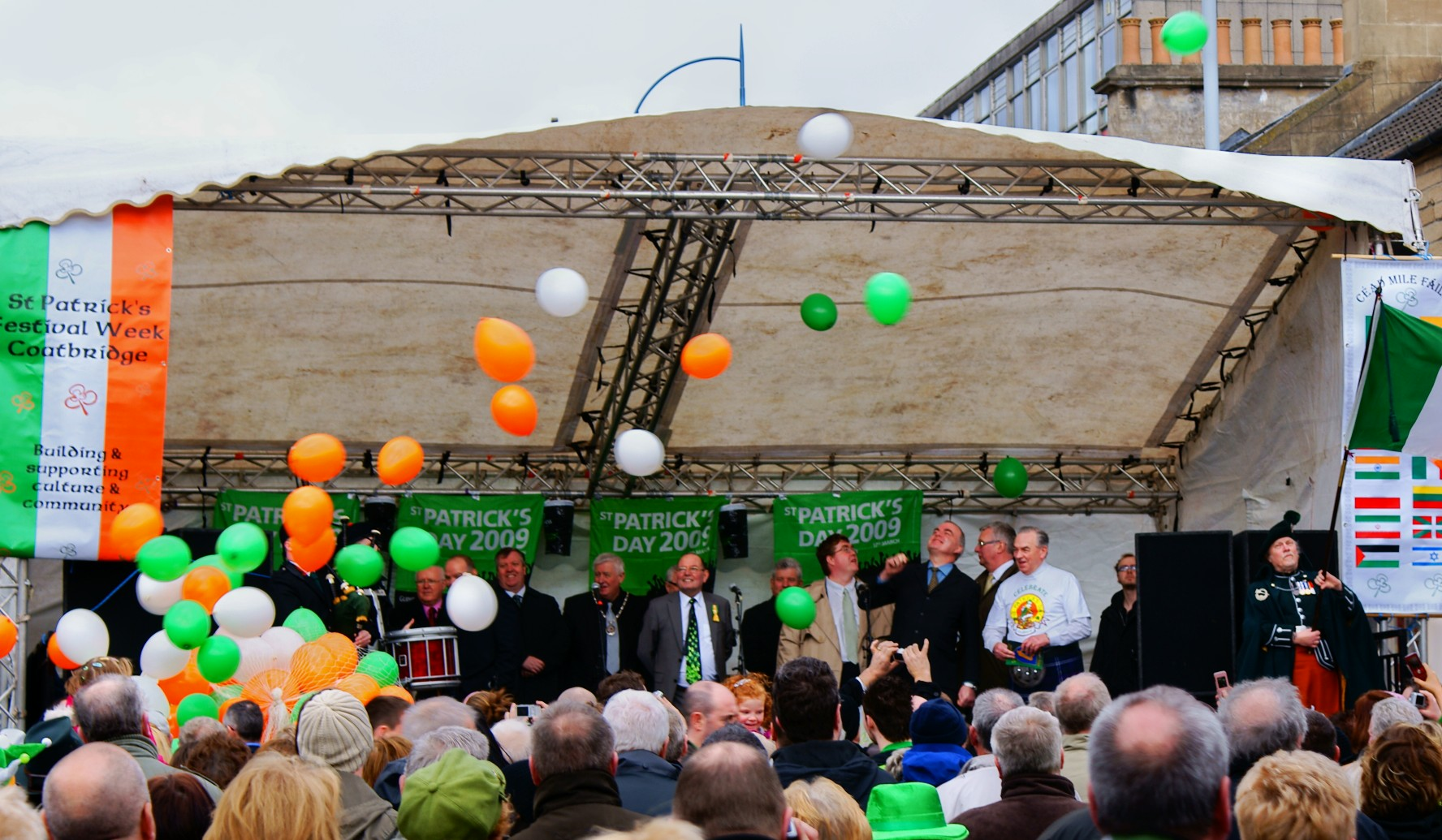
St Patrick's Day celebrations (2009)

Coatbridge is especially noted for its historical links with Ireland. This is largely due to large scale immigration into the town from Ulster, especially from County Donegal, in the 19th century and throughout most of the 20th century. Indeed, the town has been called "Little Ireland".

The most obvious manifestation of these links can be seen in the annual St Patrick's Day Festival. The festival is sponsored by the Irish Government and Guinness. The festival runs for over a fortnight and includes lectures, film shows, dance/Gaelic football competitions and music performances. The festival is the largest Irish celebration in Scotland.

=== Accent ===
The Coatbridge accent has been categorised as making less use of the Scots tongue and exhibiting a tendency to stress the "a" vowel differently from general usage. Examples of this are seen in the pronunciation of the words stair ("sterr"), hair ("herr"), fair ("ferr") and chair ("cherr"). This different enunciation has been attributed to the impact of successive influxes of Ulster Catholic immigrants into Coatbridge. However, the distinctiveness of the Coatbridge accent and pronunciation has diminished as the various surrounding populations (especially Glasgow) have mingled with that of Coatbridge.

== Sport ==
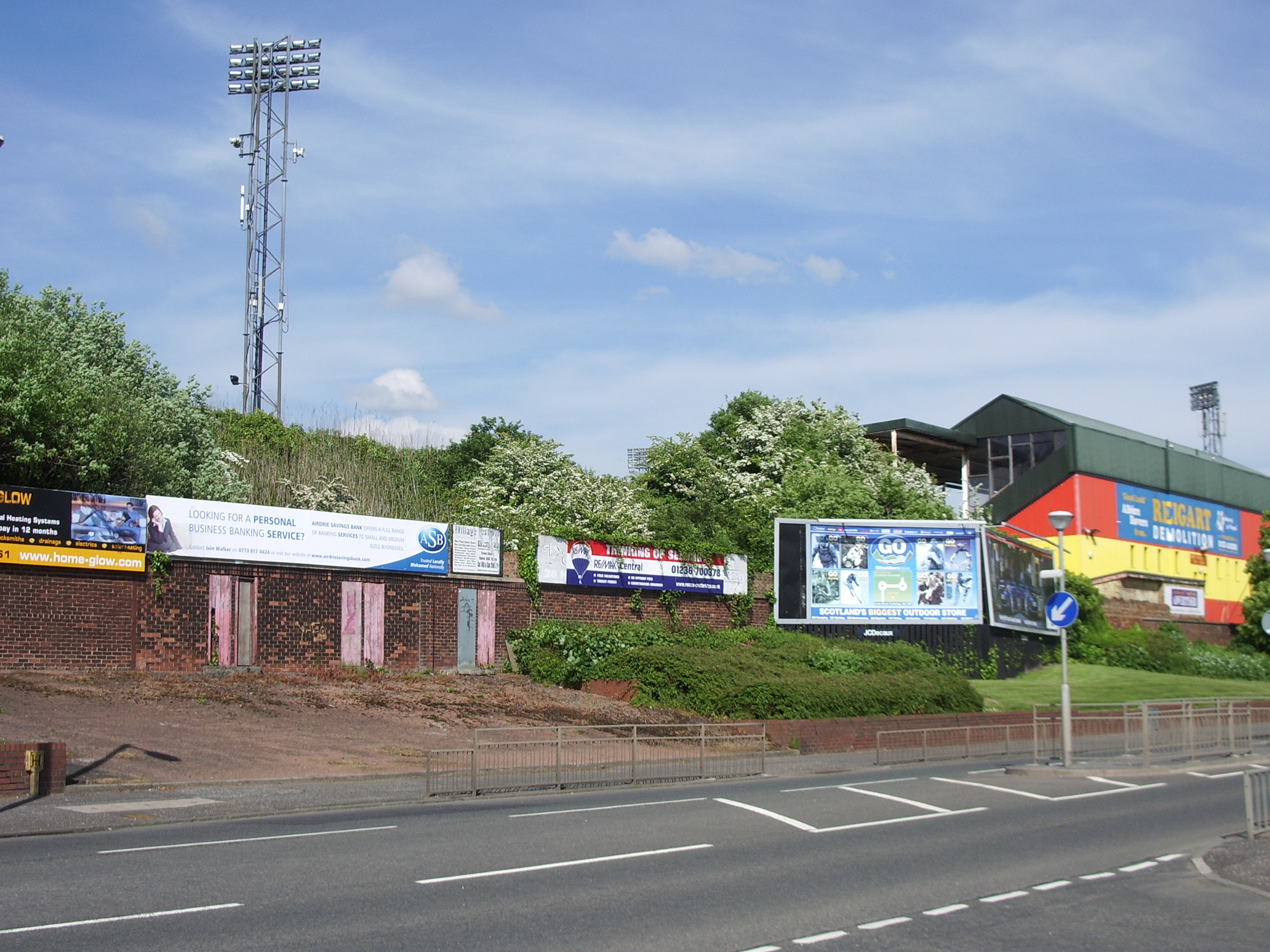
Cliftonhill, the home of Albion Rovers

Coatbridge's local football team is Albion Rovers, which plays in the Lowland Football League, having been relegated from Scottish League Two following the 2022–23 season. They play their home games at Cliftonhill. The "Wee Rovers" were founded in 1882 when two local Coatbridge clubs, Rovers and Albion, amalgamated to form the club bearing the name.

Coatbridge CC a local amateur football club founded in 1976 became Scottish Champions in 1986 and again in 1988. Coatbridge CC became the first amateur football club to win the Scottish Cup and the West of Scotland cup in the same season.

Coatbridge Bowling Club (founded 1849) celebrates its 175th anniversary in 2024 and is the oldest sports club in the town. It is situated in Bowling Street, in the Blairhill area of Coatbridge.

The Coatbridge Indoor bowling club hosted the World Indoor Bowls Championships from 1979 until 1987.

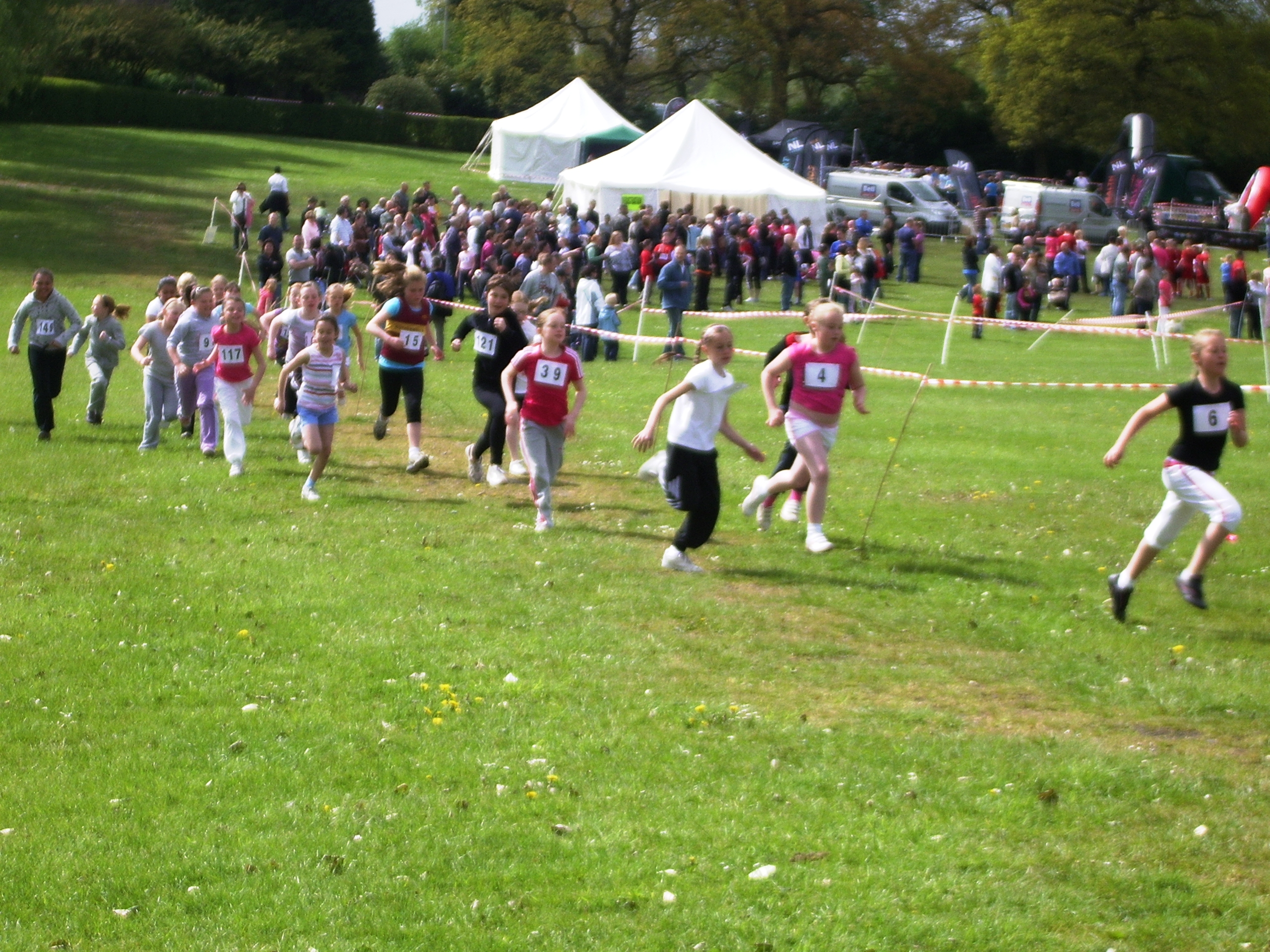
Children's fun run in Drumpellier Country Park

Drumpellier Cricket Club has been in continuous existence for over 150 years and the club has a ground in the Drumpellier area.

Greyhound and speedway racing also took part in the town, using the Albion Rovers FC ground. Greyhound racing began on 11 December 1931 and lasted until 1986. The Edinburgh Monarchs rode there in 1968–69 (as the Coatbridge Monarchs) after losing their track at Meadowbank Stadium to the developers for the 1970 Commonwealth Games. Glasgow Tigers moved from Hampden Park to Coatbridge in 1973, and stayed there until June 1977, when they were forced out by the greyhound racing.

The town was the home of former boxer Bert Gilroy, Scotland's longest-reigning champion; the former WBO super-featherweight, lightweight and light-welterweight world champion Ricky Burns; and Walter Donaldson, former world snooker champion.

There are two golf courses: the municipal course bordering Drumpellier Country Park and the nearby private members' club Drumpellier Golf Course. Clare Queen, Scotland's top golfer on the women's European tour, is from Coatbridge.

Coatbridge has a sumo club, Clan Sumo.

== Notable people ==
- Sandra Brown, the anti-child sexual abuse and bullying activist, attended Coatbridge High School
- Cha Burns (1957–2007), guitarist with the Scottish folk band The Silencers
- Ricky Burns, boxer, World super featherweight, lightweight and super lightweight champion
- Bill Carroll, radio host
- Sean Clark, former footballer
- Jock Cunningham, miner, mutineer and Republican Brigade commander during the Spanish Civil War
- Alan Frew, songwriter and lead vocalist for Canadian band Glass Tiger
- Frank Gallagher, actor (River City and Taggart), was born in Coatbridge
- James Clark Gentles, first specialist in fungal diseases of the human body
- JJ Gilmour, vocalist with the Scottish folk band The Silencers
- George Graham, footballer and manager, who played with Aston Villa, Chelsea, Arsenal and Manchester United and managed Arsenal and Tottenham Hotspur lived in Bargeddie
- Ayesha Hazarika, Baroness Hazarika, broadcaster, journalist, political commentator, and former Labour Party political adviser, grew up in Coatbridge
- Jock Kane, intelligence officer and GCHQ whistleblower
- Greg and Pat Kane, brothers that formed the 1980s band Hue and Cry, are from the Blairhill area of Coatbridge
- Mark Kerr, Scottish footballer, played for Aberdeen, and managed Ayr United
- Joe Kissock, former New Zealand international footballer
- Robert Lees, member of the Wisconsin State Senate
- Willie McDonald, footballer for Manchester United and Coventry City
- William Currie McDougall, poet and subject of the Coatbridge Free Church scandal
- Gerry Maher (Jurist), professor of criminal law, University of Edinburgh, attended St Patrick's High School
- Peter Marshall (27 May 1902 – 26 January 1949) chaplain of the United States Senate, whose biography was the basis of the Oscar-nominated film A Man Called Peter, was born in Coatbridge
- Mark Meechan (Count Dankula), controversial YouTuber, comedian, and politician
- Mark Millar, comic book writer and creator of the Millarworld franchise
- Iain Munro footballer who played for St Mirren, Hibernian, Rangers, Sunderland, Stoke and Scotland, taught at Coatbridge High School
- Hugh Murray, rugby union player
- Joseph Parker (mining engineer), born in Coatbridge
- Jamie Quinn actor and musician
- Johnny Russell, former Dundee United footballer attended Coatbridge High School
- Jock Stein, footballer and football manager who led Celtic to the European Cup in 1967, the first British club to win this trophy, played for Albion Rovers
- James Stirling, first governor of Western Australia
- Heather Suttie, DJ and radio presenter
- Stephen Trainer, footballer
- Neil Walker, professor of law at the University of Edinburgh, attended Coatbridge High School
- Tony Watt, footballer, who scored for Celtic in their win against Barcelona in 2012
- Stephen Welsh, footballer.

== Coat of arms ==
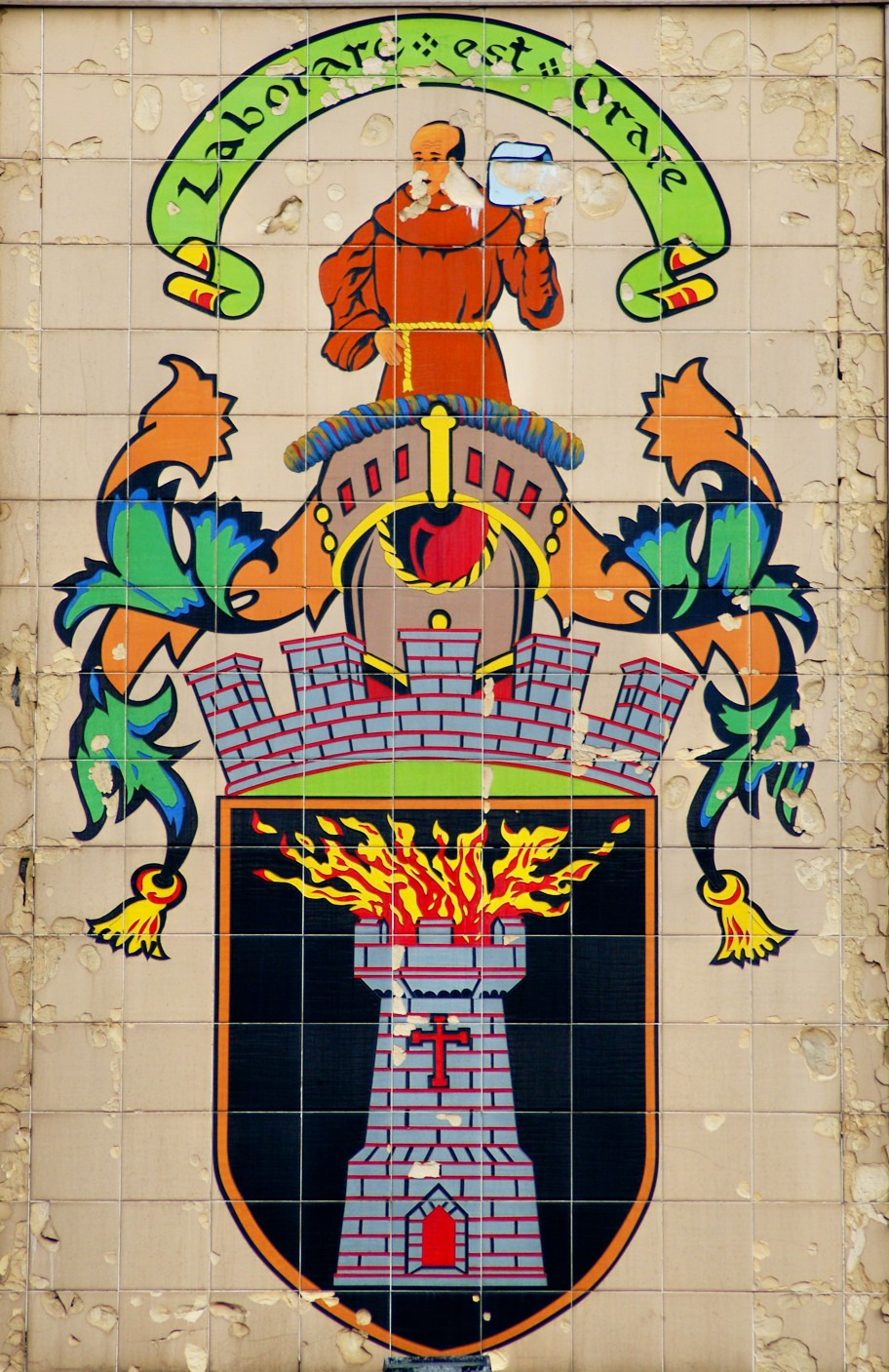
The coat of arms of Coatbridge

Coatbridge was given burgh status in 1885, and was granted a coat of arms by the Lord Lyon in 1892. The arms have a black field and on it a flaming tower to represent a blast furnace and Coatbridge's industrial tradition; the crest is a monk holding a stone in his left hand. The stone relates to the old parish of Monklands and the legend of the "aul' kirk stane", which is that a pilgrim undertaking a penance from Glasgow carried a stone in the direction of Monklands. When he could carry the stone no further (or in another version of the legend, when an angel spoke to him) he laid the stone down. It was where the stone came to rest that he was to build a church. The church is the present-day Old Monkland Kirk, at which the alleged stone can still be seen.

The Latin motto Laborare est orare translates as "to work is to pray", which originated in the writings of St Benedict and is commonly associated with the Cistercian Order, whose monks came to Monklands in the 12th century.
