= Buchanan High School =

Buchanan High School may refer to:

- Buchanan High School (Coatbridge), Scotland
- Buchanan High School (Clovis, California), United States
- Buchanan High School (Michigan), United States
