= St Ambrose High School =

Coordinates: 55.8685°N 4.0532°W

Location
- Townhead Road; Coatbridge, North Lanarkshire, ML5 2HT; Scotland

Information
- Motto: In fide, spe et caritate discendi (Learning in faith, hope, and love)
- Religious affiliation: Roman Catholic
- Established: 1961
- Local authority: North Lanarkshire Council
- Headteacher: James McParland
- Gender: Coeducational
- Age: 11 to 18

St. Ambrose High School is a coeducational secondary school located in the Townhead area of Coatbridge, North Lanarkshire, Scotland.

== History ==
The school opened in August 1961 and was originally located on Blair Road before the school moved sites to Townhead Road.

In 2019, health concerns were raised surrounding "blue water" at the school site. North Lanarkshire Council and NHS Lanarkshire said that there was no health or safety threat to pupils or staff.

In 2021, during COP26, Archbishop Claudio Gugerotti visited the school and planted a tree on the grounds.

== Notable alumni ==
=== Students ===
- Tom Boyd - professional footballer.
- Greg and Pat Kane - musicians, members of the band Hue and Cry.
- Malky Mackay - professional footballer, football coach, and manager.
- Michelle McManus - singer.
- Mark Millar – comic book writer.
- Jamie Quinn - actor.
- Mark Wilson – professional footballer and coach.

=== Staff ===
- John Cushley - professional footballer, later deputy head teacher at St. Ambrose.
