= Seduced and Abandoned =

Seduced and Abandoned may refer to:

- Seduced and Abandoned (1964 film), an Italian film
- Seduced and Abandoned (2013 film), a documentary film
- Seduced and Abandoned (album), a 1987 album by Hue and Cry
