= Drumpark School =

Coordinates: 55.8567°N 4.0670°W

- Coatbridge, North Lanarkshire; Scotland

Information
- Type: Additional Support Needs
- Established: 5 May 1926
- Closed: 31 October 2012
- Head teacher: Mrs T Collins (2005-2012)
- Teaching staff: 40–50
- Enrollment: 100–120
- Colours: (previous)Yellow and Navy, (Recent) Red, and Grey.

Drumpark School was a school for children with special educational needs at Bargeddie just west of Coatbridge in North Lanarkshire, Scotland. In August 2012, the primary department (5 to 11 years) of Drumpark School moved to their new campus, shared with Greenhill Primary School and incorporated into the vacated buildings of Coatbridge High School, retaining the Drumpark name. The secondary department (11 to 17 years) moved to a new campus shared with St Ambrose High School on 5 November 2012, changing its name to Buchanan High School.

== History of Drumpark School ==
Drumpark School opened on 5 May 1926, featuring decorations by the artist Jessie M. King. The school has had many achievements in football, winning the league two years in a row as Drumpark in 2011 and 2012, then as Buchanan High School in 2013 and 2014. The students have climbed Tinto Hill and done a lot of other sports activities over the years. The school originally was for pupils with medical issues in the early years of its history but some of the senior pupils became more mainstream than some of the younger students in the lower years in the secondary department.

The disused old buildings were subjected to arson in 2015 and were subsequently demolished, with housing planned for the site.
