= Doddie Weir =

Scottish rugby union player (1970–2022)

Doddie Weir OBE
- Born: George Wilson Weir; 4 July 1970 Edinburgh, Scotland
- Died: 26 November 2022 (aged 52) Melrose, Scottish Borders, Scotland
- Height: 1.98 m (6 ft 6 in)
- Weight: 109 kg (17 st 2 lb)

Rugby union career
- Position: Lock
Amateur team(s)
Years	Team	Apps	(Points)
1988–1989	Stewart's Melville		
1989–1995	Melrose		
Senior career
Years	Team	Apps	(Points)
1995–2002	Newcastle Falcons	97	(35)
2002–2005	Border Reivers	97	(35)
Provincial / State sides
Years	Team	Apps	(Points)
1992	Reds Trial		
International career
Years	Team	Apps	(Points)
1989	Scotland B	1	(0)
1990–2000	Scotland	61	(19)
2001	Scotland A	1	

George Wilson "Doddie" Weir OBE (4 July 1970 – 26 November 2022) was a Scottish rugby union player who played as a lock. He made 61 international appearances for the Scotland national team and represented the British & Irish Lions.

With the change to professional rugby, he was recruited to Newcastle Falcons playing 1997–2002 and he captained the club. He returned to the Borders in 2002 but retired from professional rugby in 2004. In 2016 he was diagnosed with motor neuron disease (MND).

He became involved with campaigning and fundraising, setting up a foundation named "My Name'5 Doddie" which had raised £8 million for MND research by the time that he died from this condition. The Doddie Weir Cup is named after him.

== Early life ==
Weir was born in Edinburgh, Scotland, the eldest of four children. He was the son of Nanny (Margaret, née Houston) and Jock Weir. From early childhood he was known by the traditional Scottish nickname Doddie, a derivative of George. He was brought up on Cortleferry Farm, near the village of Stow in the Scottish Borders. He was brought up with horses and he competed at local gymkhanas along with his sister Kirsty. Later he went on to represent Scotland at national equestrian events. Once, at the Scottish Horse Trials, he competed against Princess Anne.

Weir was educated at Fountainhall primary school and then at Daniel Stewart's and Melville College in Edinburgh from primary six onwards. He then studied at the Scottish Agricultural College from 1988 to 1991, gaining a Higher National Diploma.

== Rugby Union career ==
=== Amateur career ===
Weir started playing rugby for Stewart's Melville FP RFC. He was invited on a Scottish Schools tour of New Zealand in 1988. By 1989 he was playing for Melrose RFC in the Borders and was part of the team that won six Scottish club championships.

=== Provincial and professional career ===
Weir was selected for the Reds Trial side to play against the Blues Trial side on 4 January 1992. After the match, The Aberdeen Press and Journal wrote:

No way, however, should the selectors revert to Doddie Weir for the boiler-room. The Melrose youngster's future must lie at No. 8. He is simply not heavy enough to tangle with the giant English locks.

He moved to England in 1995 to join English Division Two side Newcastle Gosforth. The professional era was underway and Weir was now playing full-time. For the 1996–7 season the club took the new name of Newcastle Falcons and gained promotion. The following season the club won their first Premiership title. In August 2000 he was named as Newcastle Falcon's captain for the forthcoming season. He captained the team that was victorious in the 2001 Powergen Cup final. He played 97 matches for the club.

He featured for the Barbarian F.C. invitational side on six occasions, making his debut against Newport in 1992 and captaining the club on his final appearance against the Combined Services in 2002.

In February 2002, the Falcons announced that Weir, Gary Armstrong and George Graham would all leave the club at the end of the season to join the newly reformed Borders Rugby team. Weir remained with the Borders team until his retirement from professional rugby. Weir and Armstrong finished their playing career at the Border Reivers in May 2004.

=== International career ===
He had one solitary cap for Scotland B against Ireland B on 9 December 1989. The Herald columnist Brian Meek wrote: "Melrose's Doddie Weir still looks like he should eat more porridge, but his jumping and catching are a joy to watch... and he gets about."

Weir's first senior appearance for Scotland was on 10 November 1990 against Argentina at Murrayfield Stadium. A mainstay of the team throughout the 1990s, he was a fan favourite of the Murrayfield crowd. His first Rugby World Cup was in 1991, where Scotland lost in the third-place play-off to New Zealand. In March 1993, he was drafted in to Scotland's Sevens team for the Hong Kong Sevens when Iain Morrison sustained an injury.

He played in the 1995 Rugby World Cup and in the quarter finals scored two tries against New Zealand. He is the only Scot to have scored 2 tries against New Zealand. By the end of 1996 he was Scotland's most capped forward, but was left out of Scotland's squad against Italy. He scored a try against France at Murrayfield in the Five Nations on 1 March 1997. In 1997 he was the first recipient of the Famous Grouse Scotland Player of the Five Nations Award.

He was once described by commentator Bill McLaren as being "On the charge like a mad giraffe".

A lineout specialist, he was selected as part of the British & Irish Lions tour of South Africa in 1997. Whilst on the tour he suffered a serious knee injury, as a result of foul play, while playing against Mpumalanga Province.

His time in the national side declined in later years as the next generation of locks emerged, with the likes of Stuart Grimes and eventual Scotland cap record holder Scott Murray coming into the team. His final appearance was in the Six Nations Championship match against France at Murrayfield, on 4 March 2000. In February 2001 he captained the Scotland A side.

He won 61 Scottish caps, scoring 19 points from four tries (his first scoring four points under the old scoring system).

== After playing career ==
In 2005, having retired from professional rugby, Weir settled in to the 300-acre Bluecairn Farm, located only a few miles from where he was brought up at Cortleferry. He went on to work for Hutchinson Environmental Solutions, a waste management company that was started by his father-in-law. Weir was given the position of commercial director. He was also active on the after-dinner speech circuit.

He occasionally made appearances in his distinctive tartan suits on television, including work as a pundit for the BBC as part of the half-time analysis during Scotland matches and commentating at the Melrose Sevens.

== Illness and campaigning ==
In June 2017, Weir announced that he had been diagnosed with motor neurone disease (MND), the announcement coinciding with global MND Awareness Day. He had been told by a specialist in December that he had MND with a prediction that he would be unable to walk within a year. In August 2017, he spoke about plans to set up a foundation named "My Name'5 Doddie" in order to "raise funds for research into a cure for MND and to provide grants to people living with the condition". In November, accompanied by his wife and three sons, he walked the match ball on to the pitch at Murrayfield for the Autumn international test match between Scotland and the All Blacks. At the outset Weir viewed himself as lucky to have been able to be involved with campaigning and fundraising while still raising his family.

My Name's Doddie: The Autobiography was published on 25 October 2018 through Black & White Publishing. On 31 October 2018, Weir appeared on BBC One's The One Show, where he stated that his charity had now raised over £1 million. By March 2019, the foundation had committed to distribute more than £2 million from funds raised. A fellow rugby international and BBC broadcaster John Beattie followed Doddie over a couple of years. The result was a 60-minute BBC TV documentary Doddie Weir: One More Try that first aired on BBC Scotland On 6 December 2019.

In January 2020 Weir confirmed his own participation in a clinical trial aimed at finding drugs that could slow, stop or reverse the progression of MND. He encouraged people with a diagnosis of MND to enrol in the MND-Smart programme which would trial new drugs, existing drugs and a placebo. In October 2021 a further publication, Doddie's Diary, contained descriptions of how his condition was worsening. By June 2022 his foundation, My Name's Doddie, had raised £8 million for MND research.

On 13 November 2022, for the match against the All Blacks, the Scotland shirts incorporated the My Names Doddie tartan. Weir, now in a wheelchair, and his family participated in the delivery of the matchday ball as he had when the All Blacks last visited Murrayfield in 2017.

=== Death ===
Weir died of motor neurone disease in 2022, aged 52. A memorial service was held at Melrose Parish Church, with audio from the service relayed to Melrose RFC's ground The Greenyards.

== Personal life ==
Weir married Kathy Huchinson in 1997. They have three sons.

== Tartan ==
Weir designed his tartan in 2018 in collaboration with Berwickshire-based clothes firm ScotlandShop, in a bid to raise cash for the My Name'5 Doddie Foundation. The tartan features colours from the teams he played for: black and yellow of Melrose, blue and white of Scotland, and black of the former and white of the latter are also intended as a reference to his seven years with Newcastle Falcons. It is officially registered on the Scottish Register of Tartans, reference: 12047. After Weir's death, rugby league club Leeds Rhinos paid tribute to Weir by incorporating the tartan into a commemorative kit for the 2023 Magic Weekend. Weir had become good friends with former Rhinos player and fellow MND sufferer Rob Burrow.

== Honours ==
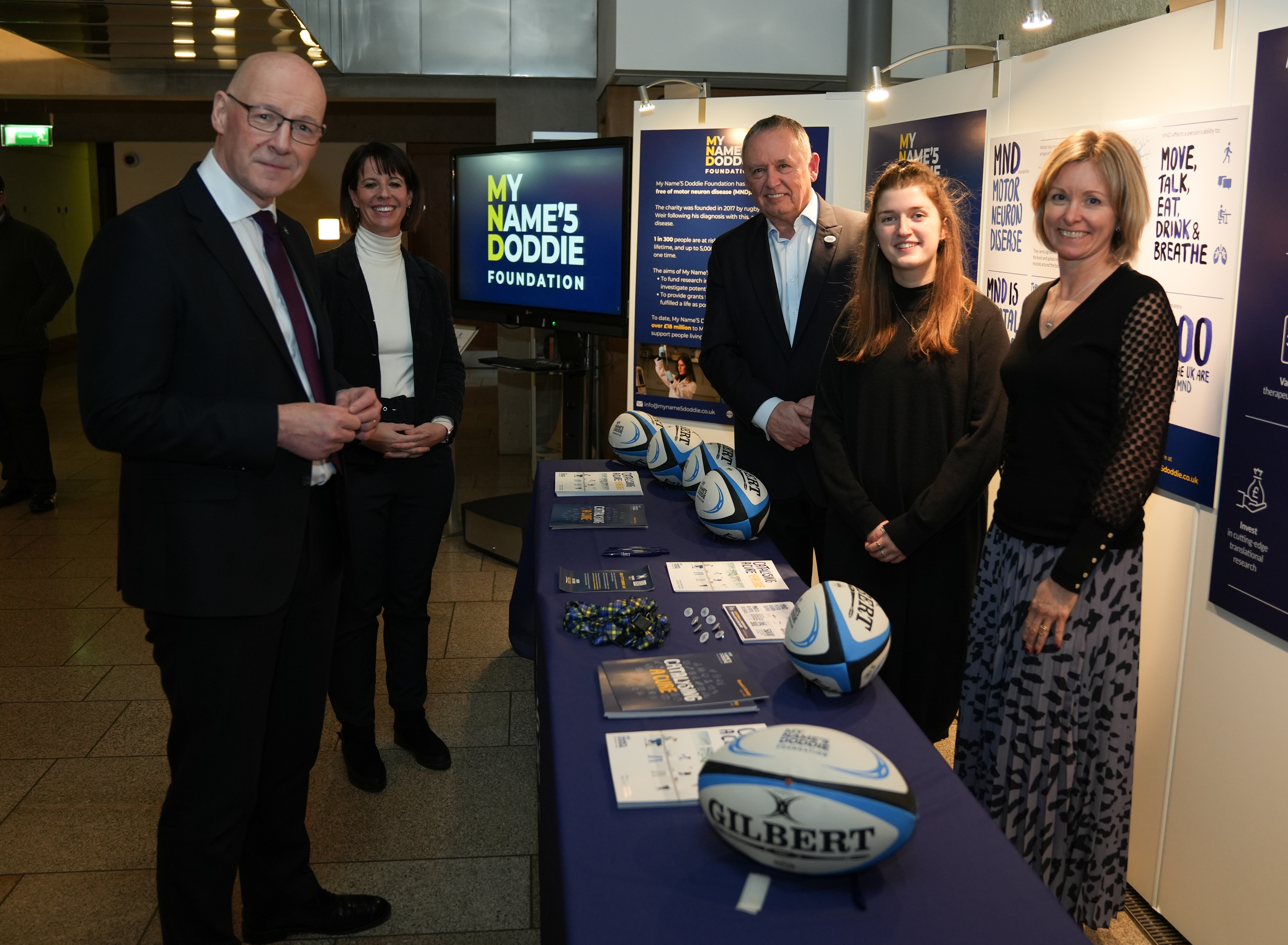
Scottish First Minister and the My Name's Doddie Foundation in 2025

Weir was appointed an Officer of the Order of the British Empire (OBE) in the 2019 New Year Honours for services to rugby, to motor neurone disease research and to the community in the Scottish Borders. He collected the award from Queen Elizabeth II at an investiture at Holyrood Palace in July 2019.

Named in his honour, the Doddie Weir Cup is a perpetual rugby union trophy for matches played between Scotland and Wales. The inaugural competition was played in Cardiff in November 2018, with competitive encounters most likely to be played in the Six Nations.

In November 2018, he was presented by the Lord Provost of Edinburgh with the Edinburgh Award in recognition of the contribution he has made to the city, to sport and to motor neurone disease (MND) awareness and research – the twelfth recipient of this award. At the World Rugby Awards, he received the Award for Character. That same month, Glasgow Caledonian University conferred him with an Honorary Degree in recognition of his outstanding contribution to the sporting community and his commitment to fundraising for the common good.

In December 2019, Weir was announced as the recipient of the Helen Rollason Award, which is presented every year during the annual BBC Sports Personality of the Year show. The award was presented to him by Princess Anne.

In July 2020, he was inducted into the Scottish Rugby hall of fame. That year, the National Galleries of Scotland announced that a portrait of Weir by artist Gerard M. Burns had been loaned to the Scottish collection.

In November 2021, Melrose Rugby announced Weir as being appointed to the honorary position of joint President of the club.

In July 2022 he was awarded an honorary degree by Abertay University.
