= Sean Clark (footballer, born 1980) =

Scottish footballer (born 1979)

Personal information
- Full name: Sean Clark
- Date of birth: 10 December 1980 (age 45)
- Place of birth: Coatbridge, Scotland
- Position: Defender

Senior career*
Years	Team	Apps	(Gls)
1997-1998	Albion Rovers	1	(0)
1999-2000	Livingston	2	(0)
1999-2000	→ Montrose (loan)	8	(0)
2000-2001	Albion Rovers	22	(0)
2001-?	Cumnock Juniors		
- * Club domestic league appearances and goals

Sean Clark (born 10 December 1980) is a Scottish former footballer who played as a defender for Albion Rovers and Livingston.

== Career ==
=== Albion Rovers and Livingston ===
Clark began his career at Albion Rovers and made one appearance before signing for Livingston in 1999. His time at the Almondvale Stadium was just one season long, where he made 2 appearances. One of those appearances was in a 2–0 win against Airdrieonians on 6 May 2000. He assisted David Bingham who scored the opening goal.

=== Montrose and return to Albion Rovers ===
The defender struggled to break into a Livingston first team which was bolstered with seasoned pro's such as Brian McPhee, David Bingham and John Robertson. He had a short loan spell at Montrose where he made 8 appearances during the remainder of the 1999–2000 season.

In 2000, Clark was brought back to his first club Albion Rovers by then manager John McVeigh. He made 22 appearances during his second spell for the Wee Rovers and left the club at the end of the 2000–2001 season.

=== Cumnock Juniors ===
Clark moved into the junior leagues and signed for Cumnock Juniors in 2001.
