= Lees of Scotland =

Confectionery manufacturer in Scotland

Lees Foods Limited
- Industry: Confectionery
- Founded: 1931 in Coatbridge, North Lanarkshire, Scotland
- Founder: John Justice Lees
- Headquarters: Coatbridge, Scotland
- Area served: United Kingdom
- Products: Meringues, snowballs, teacakes and confectionery bars
- Number of employees: 200 (2017)
- Website: www.leesofscotland.co.uk

Lees Foods Limited, commonly known as Lees of Scotland, is a manufacturer of branded confectionery and meringues in Coatbridge, North Lanarkshire, Scotland.

== History ==
The company was founded in 1931 by John Justice Lees, the son of a grocer on Newland Street in Coatbridge. Lees had been attempting to create a smooth chocolate fondant bar in a workshop above the family shop in Newlands Street. Although unsuccessful, he attempted to coat the bar in coconut as an experiment, leading to the recipe for the Lees Macaroon bar.

The original products manufactured by Lees are the Lees Macaroon bar and the Lees Snowball. The company subsequently added other products, later adding tablet, fudge and coconut ice bars.

In 1982, Lees set up Heather Cameron Foods, expanding the company to manufacture meringues. Lees bought out the company seven years later, becoming the outright owner. The company suffered losses during the 1980s, and was sold to Fine Foods in 1991. Two years later, it regained independent ownership.

== Operations ==
Lees ran two factories based in Coatbridge, one making Heather Cameron meringues and the other snowballs, teacakes and confectionery bars. In August 1998, the company moved into a 82,000 square feet (7,600 m^{2}) premises which catered for the entire company's product range. The factory employs around 200 people around Coatbridge, and reported a £26.4m turnover in 2017. It houses nine separate production lines, and uses cloud computing technology to operate a just-in-time supply system. The company makes 80% of its sales in Scotland, as the rest of the United Kingdom is less familiar with tablet or macaroon.

The company slogan is "Lees, Lees, more if you please".
