= Joseph Parker (mining engineer) =

Scottish mining engineer and educator

Joseph Parker FRSE MIME (28 October 1871 – 5 October 1940) was a Scottish mining engineer and educator.

== Biography ==
Parker was born in Coatbridge on 28 October 1871, the son of Elizabeth Ellen (née Wilson) and William Todd Parker, a coalminer. He was raised in Hamilton, and became a miner when aged 13. However, he vowed to improve himself and took classes at Hamilton Academy. He studied Mining Science at the University of Edinburgh where he gained a doctorate (DSc). He also took a course in Electrical Engineering at Heriot-Watt.

In 1894, he began lecturing in Mining Technology for Fife County Council. From 1901 he also took on the role of Colliery Manager at Cardenden.

From 1902 he was Principal of Fife Mining School, based in Cowdenbeath, living then at 128 Stenhouse Street in Cowdenbeath.

In 1924, he was elected a Fellow of the Royal Society of Edinburgh. His proposers were Henry Briggs, Arthur Pillans Laurie, Francis Gibson Baily, and James Cooper.

He retired in 1937.

He died in Dunfermline on 5 October 1940.

== Family ==
In 1896, he married his first cousin, Mary Parker. They had a daughter, Agnes Parker, and a son, Joseph Parker.
