= Buchanan High School (Coatbridge) =

Coordinates: 55.8688°N 4.0538°W

Location
- 67 Townhead Road; Coatbridge, North Lanarkshire, ML5 2HT; Scotland

Information
- Former name: Drumpark School
- Type: Additional support needs
- Established: 5 November 2012; 13 years ago
- Head teacher: M. McGinley
- Staff: 20–30
- Age: 12 to 18
- Enrolment: 101
- Colours: Black and grey
- Website: en-gb.facebook.com/BuchananHigh

Buchanan High School is an additional support needs secondary school in the Townhead neighbourhood of Coatbridge, North Lanarkshire, Scotland. Replacing the previous facility Drumpark School established in the 1920s (the name of which continues in a separate ASN primary school in the town), the school opened on 5 November 2012 and shares a campus with St Ambrose Roman Catholic High School and Townhead Community Centre. The school has over 100 pupils.

The Head of School since 2017 is Mr M. McGinley. The inaugural head, from 2012 until 2016, was Mrs M. Fannan who was succeeded by Mrs J. Gilmartin from 2016 to 2017.

In 2019, teachers at the school went out on strike to highlight serious concerns over health issues – the shared campus was built on a former industrial landfill site, with the water table observed to be contaminated and discoloured; four teachers developed cancer and it was feared this was linked to the conditions at the school.
