= Whifflet =

Suburb of Coatbridge, Scotland

Coordinates: 55°51′14″N 4°01′02″W

Whifflet (Scots: The Whufflit, Scottish Gaelic: Magh na Cruithneachd) is an area of the town of Coatbridge, Scotland, which once formed its own distinctive village. It is referred to, locally, as "The Whifflet" (and pronounced "wheef-lat" or "whiff-lat").

Whifflet was originally known as "The Wheat Flats", due to its flat empty land of dry wheat however, over time the name appears to have developed into "Whifflet". Although Whifflet is now a suburb-area of Coatbridge, many locals still refer to it as "The Whifflet", with emphasis on the 'The'.

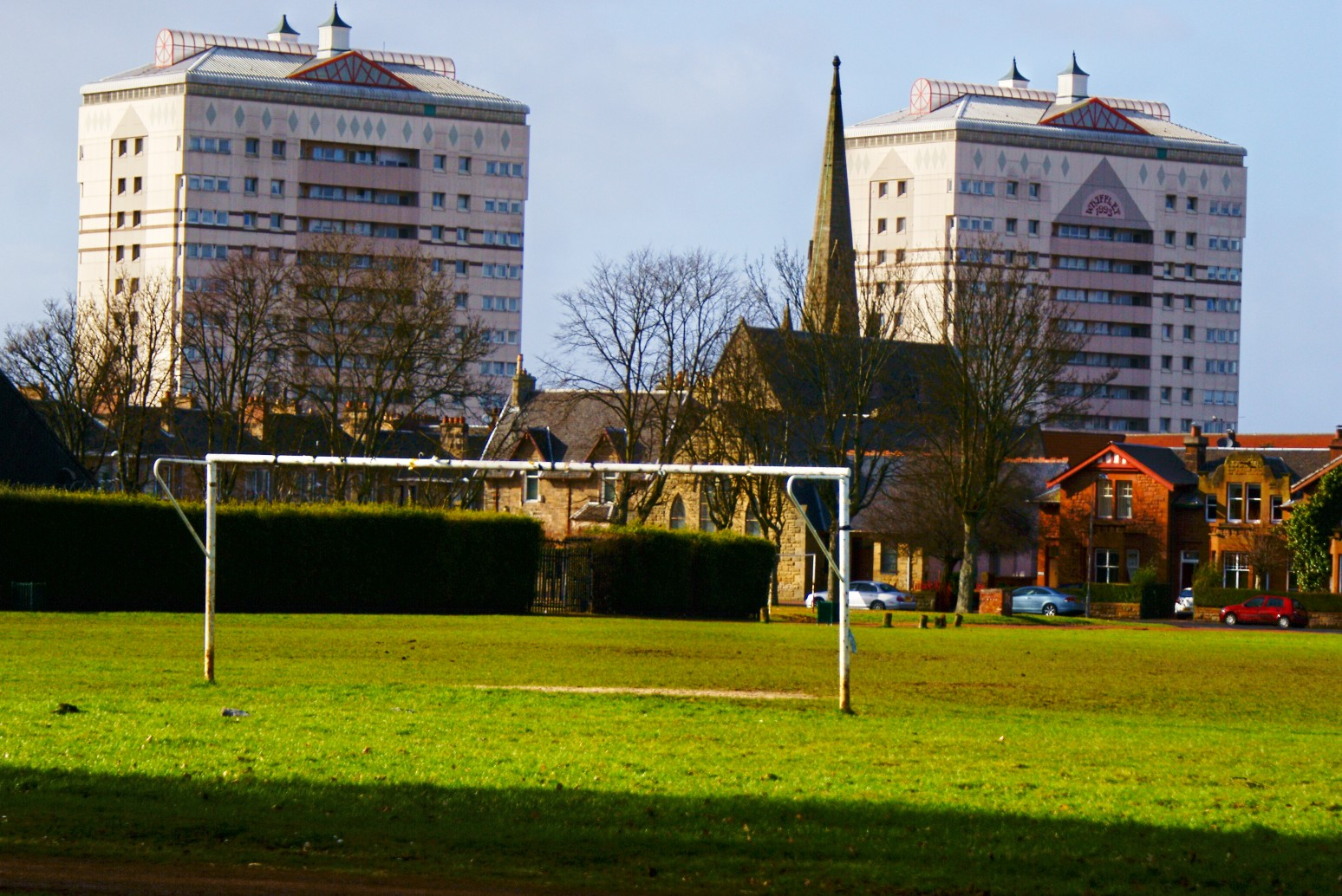
Whifflet Park in Coatbridge looking north showing Whifflet Court and Calder Court in the background.

Whifflet is dominated by its Main Street, aptly named 'Whifflet Street', which has numerous shops, takeout restaurants, bookmakers, an old fashioned sweet shop and many pubs.

There are two main tower blocks of flats located on Whifflet Street, named 'Whifflet Court' and 'Calder Court'. Both tower blocks, built in 1963, contain 165 individual residences (330 in total) and are 15 storeys high. There are current discussions underway with North Lanarkshire Council to demolish various tower blocks across the county and replace them with more affordable and energy efficient homes, both 'Whifflet Court' and 'Calder Court' are within the remit of demolition.

== History ==
Whifflet, originally a separate village, became a 'colliery' (coal town) whilst also supplying tinplate, iron and digging the coal for the 'foundry fires' around Coatbridge.

Coatbridge was, historically, a centre of mining activity and supported some of the largest coal mining operations from the 1810s to the 1930s. Coal, Iron and Tinplate works became more successful in Whifflet due to rail connections. A Whifflet coal pit, in the 19th century, is said to have reached a depth of 330 feet (100 metres) underground.

Albion Rovers football club was originally based in the Whifflet area at Meadow Park. This area is now occupied by Whifflet Park, a railway line and an electrical substation.

== Demographics ==
Similar to Coatbridge, Whifflet is said to have a large Irish population and influence, dating back to the early 20th Century.

The life expectancy of males in Whifflet is said to be 75.6 years of age and of females is 77.9 years of age as at 2019. The average in Scotland is 77.1 (males) and 81.0 (females) as of 2019.

The 2019 population of Whifflet is recorded as 3,211 residents.

The Xaverian Missionaries (known locally as "Xaverian Fathers") have been located in Whifflet since 1958. The current complex occupies a large residential and conference facility for use by local schools, parishes, communities and commercial groups. The complex, known as the Conforti Institute, replaces an old Victorian property and an old school building.

== Travel ==
Whifflet Railway Station, which opened in 1992 provides travel links to Glasgow, Motherwell, Coatbridge, and Cumbernauld, and now London.

The current railway station is a replacement of the original railway station which opened in 1845.

== Notable residents ==
Notable residents have included:

- Jock Cunningham – Coatbridge miner, mutineer and brigade commander on the Republican side during the Spanish Civil War who lived at number 77b Whifflet Street.
