= Hugh Murray (rugby union) =

Scotland international rugby union player

- Born: Hugh Martin Murray; 3 May 1912 Coatbridge, North Lanarkshire, Scotland
- Died: 6 January 2003 (aged 90)

Rugby union career
- Position: Centre
International career
Years	Team	Apps	(Points)
1936	Scotland	2	

Hugh Martin Murray (3 May 1912 – 6 January 2003) was a Scottish international rugby union player, who played for Scotland at centre. He was capped twice in 1936. He was born in Coatbridge.
