= William Currie McDougall =

Scottish minister

William Currie McDougall (1840–1920) was a Scottish minister of the Free Church of Scotland who is remembered as a poet and for an infamous and unusual court case in which he became embroiled, known as the "Coatbridge Free Church Scandal".

== Life ==
He was born in Glasgow on 9 January 1840 the son of Alexander McDougall, a horn spoon maker, and his wife, Agnes Currie. He moved in his youth to Saltcoats and lived in a miner's cottage on Raise Street in the town centre. Although some records state there was "no mining" in Saltcoats this is incorrect. The Stevenston coal mine lay on the edge of the town,

He emigrated to America in his youth and studied Theology there. He was ordained in the church of Plato, Indiana in 1871. He also spent time in California which was the subject of several of his poems.

He returned to Scotland in 1878 and was licensed to preach by the Free Church of Scotland in 1879. He appears to have initially assisted at a mission in High Blantyre as he appears in records on 2 July 1879 attending one of the several Blantyre mining disasters, occurring in a coal mine owned by William Dixon & Co in which 27 were killed and many others injured.

In 1883 he was ordained at the West Free Church in Coatbridge. As a very rare event in Free Church history, he was "loosed" (fired) from his post on 19 October 1899. This action was further verified as correct in the General Assembly of 1900. This action resulted in a court case in Edinburgh's High Court in January/February 1902. The church claimed he was released due to "inefficiency". McDougall, in a strange counter-claim, aimed to damage the Free Church, he said it was his opposition to alcohol which caused his release (implying that the Free Church supported alcoholic drink, which is not really true). The court ruled the whole affair outwith their jurisdiction. However, as McDougall refused to promise not to preach again in Coatbridge he was found in contempt of court and had to serve 28 days in Calton Prison, being released on 7 March 1902. This was undoubtedly a severe shock to McDougall, whose attitude (as with many clergy) was one of being beyond reproach.

McDougall was totally broken by this event and abandoned all hope of re-employment. He returned to Saltcoats/Ardrossan (probably living with a sister there).

He died in Ardrossan (adjacent to Saltcoats) in 1920 aged 80.

== Poems ==
- A Wayside Sermon: to the Old Pump Well in Raise Street Saltcoats (this was a water supply pump)
- Lines to the Yosemite
- Santa Clara
- To the Memory of Dr T W Tilden, Chico, California
- A Summer Scene: Hollister
- The Picket in War
- The Fatal Bullet
- The Unveiling of the Statue of Livingstone in George Square, Glasgow (1879)
- Drumclog, 1679 (1879)
- The Tay Bridge Disaster (1879)

== Other publications ==
- An Awakened Church (1892)
- Rome or Rum and the Cure for Both
- Gleams Yont the Gloom (1893)
