= Coatbridge Library =

Coordinates: 55°51′50″N 04°01′42″W

Coatbridge Public Library
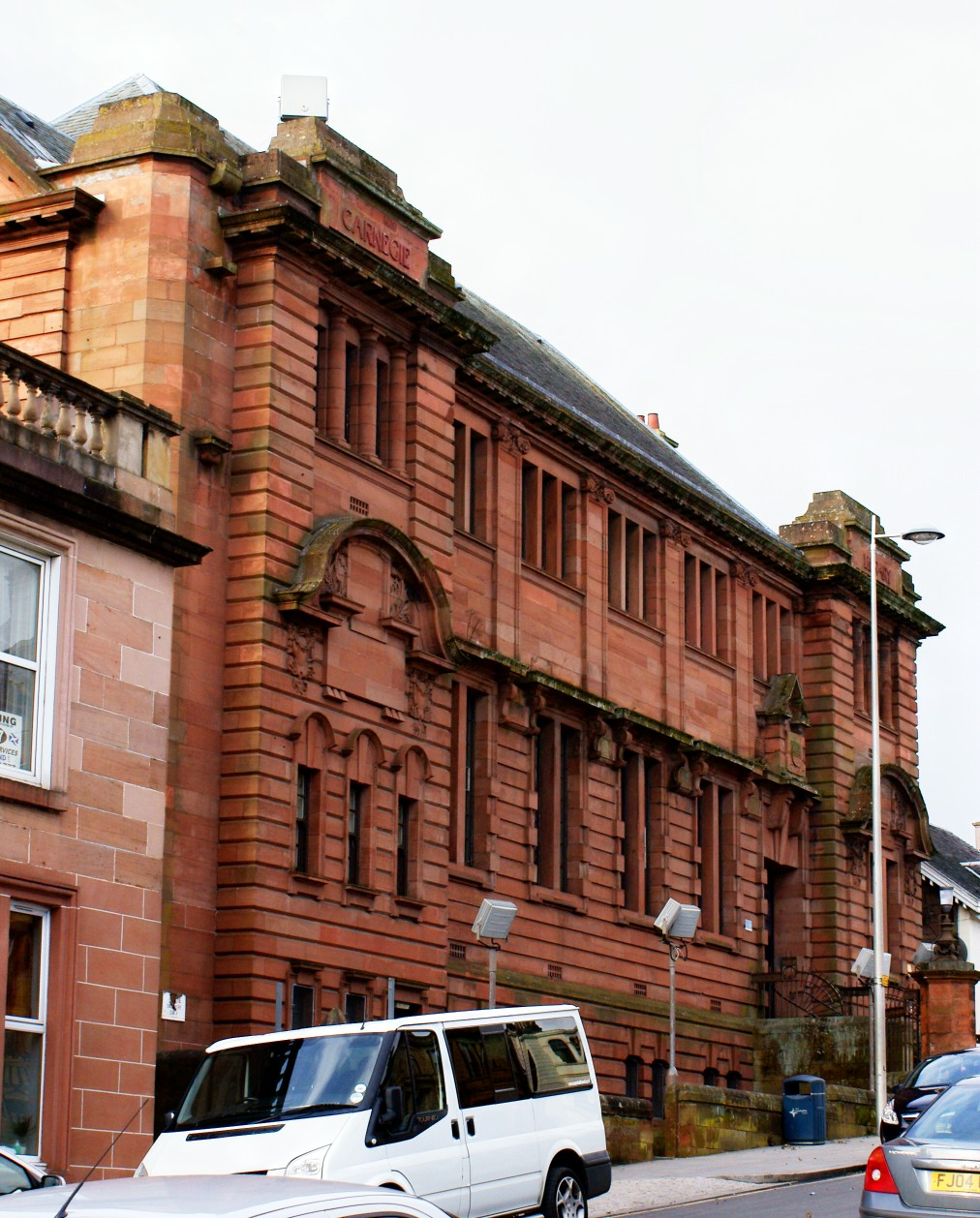
- Coatbridge Public Library in 2009
- Interactive map of the Coatbridge Public Library area

General information
- Architectural style: Beaux Arts
- Location: Coatbridge, Scotland

Design and construction
- Architect: Alexander Cullen

Coatbridge Library is a public library in Coatbridge, North Lanarkshire, Scotland.

== Original location ==
The building was designed by Alexander Cullen and built in 1905. It is a Carnegie library; its construction was financed by money donated by the Scottish-American entrepreneur Andrew Carnegie. Carnegie officially opened the library on 7 June 1906 in person; he received the ceremonial freedom of burgh of Coatbridge in return.

The building was category B listed by Historic Scotland in 1993. It is a large, two-storey building of pink Corsehill sandstone, in the Beaux-Arts style. The design was chosen by competition. Built on a steep hill on Academy Street, it has an imposing looming presence. The rear of the building can be seen on the Coatbridge skyline when approached from the west via the A89 road.

In 2016, and after the relocation of the library services in 2010, permission was granted to the Clyde Valley Housing Association to convert the former Carnegie library into residential accommodation. Grant funded assistance came from Historic Environment Scotland, after the library was identified by the Coatbridge Conservation Area Regeneration Scheme as a funding priority.
