= Seduced and Abandoned (album) =

Studio album by Hue and Cry
- Released: 26 October 1987
- Genre: Sophisti-pop
- Length: 44:42
- Label: Circa
- Producer: Harvey Jay Goldberg, James Biondolillo

Hue and Cry chronology
Seduced and Abandoned (1987)	Remote (1988)

Seduced and Abandoned is the debut album by the Scottish duo Hue and Cry. It was released in 1987 and includes the UK Top 10 single "Labour of Love".

== Track listing ==
1. "Strength to Strength" - 4:26
2. "History City" - 3:24
3. "Goodbye to Me" - 4:09
4. "Human Touch" - 3:58
5. "Labour of Love" - 3:32
6. "I Refuse" - 3:32
7. "Something Warmer" - 4:06
8. "Alligator Man" - 3:58
9. "Love Is the Master" - 4:10
10. "Just One Word" - 4:04
11. "Truth" - 4:46

The LP version of the album excludes the track "Something Warmer".

== Personnel ==
- Pat Kane: lead vocals and backing vocals
- Greg Kane: synthesizers and electronic piano
- Nigel Clark: electric guitar
- James Finnigan: bass
- Tony McCracken: drums
- David Preston: backing vocals
- Robert Purse: percussion on Labour of Love
- Ronnie Goodman: percussion

== Certifications ==
Region	Certification	Certified units/sales
United Kingdom (BPI)	Silver	60,000^{^}
^{^} Shipments figures based on certification alone.
