= Gerard M. Burns =

Scottish painter and musician

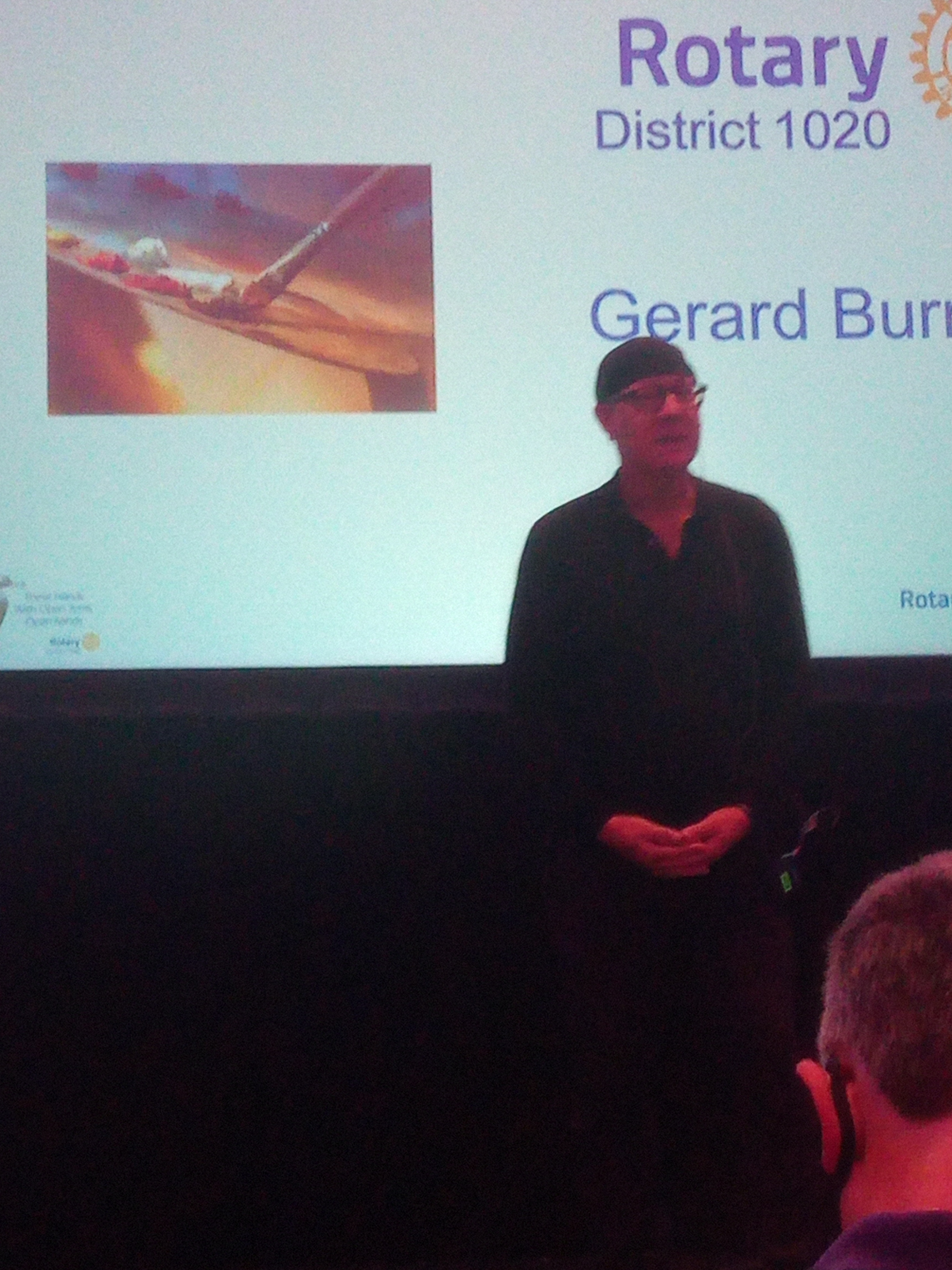
- Gerard Burns talking about his work in 2021
- Born: 13 June 1961; Glasgow
- Education: Glasgow School of Art
- Known for: painting
- Notable work: Labyrinth; A New Journey; The Rowan
- Awards: N. A. Macfarlane Charitable Trust Award (1997); Not the Turner Prize (2003)
- Website: www.gerardmburns.com

Gerard M. Burns (born 13 June 1961) is a Scottish painter and musician. One of Scotland’s best known portrait artists, Burns has been heralded as one of the country’s leading artists of the human condition, playing a pivotal role in promoting the genre.

== Life and art ==
Burns was born in Glasgow. He graduated from the Glasgow School of Art in 1983 with a degree in Fine Art.

As a student, he conceived the band Valerie & The Week of Wonders with Brian McFie, Greg Kane and Ewan McFie. The group signed to A&M Records & Rondor Publishing in 1984. Burns was the singer, songwriter and guitarist. His subsequent band, Heaven Sent, supported Simple Minds.

He returned to painting in 1990, when he became a Principal of Art at St Aloysius' College, Glasgow. After teaching for a total of 12 years, he became a full-time painter in 1999.

In 2003, Burns was the inaugural receiver of Not The Turner Prize for his figurative oil on canvas, Labyrinth. His painting A New Journey appeared on the First Minister's Christmas Card in 2009 and featured Burns's niece holding a saltire. In 2014, his 14 for 14 exhibition was launched during the XX Commonwealth Games in Glasgow. His Painting ‘The Rowan’ hung behind Alex Salmonds desk in the Scottish Parliament for the duration of his Tenure as First Minister. His portrait of Alex Salmond was unveiled in the Scottish Portrait gallery in Dec 2015.

In April 2015, on the occasion of Scotland Week, he opened the exhibition A Brush with Inspiration in New York, featuring 16 paintings of notable Scots, from Ewan McGregor to Nicola Sturgeon. After the high-profile SoHo gallery, he decided to show his works to the Scots in a shopping center in Easterhouse, which he saw as "a metaphor ... for areas of social deprivation and the thought that there shouldn’t be a postcode lottery when it comes to access to the arts." He donated the paintings to raise money for a new hospice in Glasgow.

Burns usually takes photographs of his subjects before working on their portraits. The painter notes, however, that "each of the various pictorial elements also contains a deeper symbolic meaning... My goal is realism, but it’s by increasingly abstract means that realism is attained.".

== Charity work ==
Burns has donated much of the proceeds from his works for charity. His painting Road to Emmaus raised awareness of the work of Emmaus, a charity helping homeless people. His portrait of Alex Salmond raised 50,000 pounds for CLIC Sargent, a charity supporting children and young people with cancer and their families. The portrait of Billy Connolly raised 40,000 pounds for the National Trust for Scotland. Burns launched a special collection of prints to raise money for Mary's Meals, a charity setting up school feeding projects in some of the world's poorest communities.

== Solo exhibitions ==
- 2014: 14 for 14, Glasgow
- 2014: Fairhill Winter Exhibition, Glasgow
- 2015: A Brush with Inspiration, New York
- 2017: GCU Exhibition, Glasgow

== Collections ==
Burns's works are kept in several private and public collections.

Corporate and public collections:

- The Royal Bank of Scotland
- Standard Charter Bank
- Hunterian Gallery, Glasgow
- Scottish Parliament (First Ministers Office)
- Accenture, Dublin
- Jesuits (SJ) millennium commission, London

Private owners of his works include:

- Ewan McGregor
- Sir Tom and Marion Hunter
- Sir Philip Green
- Malaysian royal family

== Awards ==
- 1997: RGI.\ Winner "N. A. Macfarlane Charitable Trust Award"
- 2003: Daily Mail "Not the Turner" competition, first prize
