= Remote (album) =

Studio album by Hue and Cry
- Released: 28 November 1988
- Label: Circa
- Producer: Harvey Jay Goldberg, James Biondolillo, Gregory Phillip Kane

Hue and Cry chronology
Seduced and Abandoned (1987)	Remote (1988)	Bitter Suite (1989)

Remote is the second studio album by Scottish duo Hue and Cry. It was released in 1988, and re-released in 2008. It includes the Top 20 single "Looking for Linda".

== Track listing ==
All tracks composed by Gregory and Patrick Kane; lyrics by Patrick Kane

1. "Ordinary Angel" - 4:26
2. "Looking for Linda" - 3:48
3. "Guy On the Wall" - 4:54
4. "Violently" - 4:04
5. "Dollar William" - 4:11
6. "Under Neon" - 3:42
7. "The Only Thing (More Powerful Than the Boss)" - 3:55
8. "Where We Wish to Remain" - 3:57
9. "Sweet Invisibility" - 4:28
10. "Three Foot Blasts of Fire" - 4:15
11. "Remote" - 4:22
12. "Family of Eyes" - 4:19

The LP version of the album excludes the tracks "Under Neon" and "Family of Eyes".

== Certifications ==
Region	Certification	Certified units/sales
United Kingdom (BPI)	Gold	100,000^{^}
^{^} Shipments figures based on certification alone.
