= Labour of Love (song) =

1987 single by Hue and Cry

- Cover art for 1993 release

Single by Hue and Cry

from the album Seduced and Abandoned
- Released: 1 June 1987
- Genre: Sophisti-pop; soul
- Label: Circa
- Songwriters: Gregory Kane, Patrick Kane
- Producers: Harvey Jay Goldberg and James Biondolillo

"Labour of Love" is a song by Scottish duo Hue and Cry, released in 1987 as the second single from their debut album, Seduced and Abandoned. It peaked at number 6 in the UK Singles Chart.

In 1993, the song was remixed by house music producer/DJ Joey Negro and released as a single that reached number 25 in Britain.

"Labour of Love" was featured on the soundtrack for the video game Grand Theft Auto: Episodes from Liberty City.

== Personnel ==
- Pat Kane: lead vocals and backing vocals
- Greg Kane: electronic piano
- Nigel Clark: electric guitar
- James Finnigan: bass
- Tony McCracken: drums
- David Preston: backing vocals
- Robert Purse: bongos

== Music video ==
The music video was filmed in Lawrence Hall, London
