= Bitter Suite (album) =

Live album by Hue and Cry
- Released: 1989
- Recorded: 22 September 1989
- Venue: Renfrew Ferry
- Genre: Pop
- Length: 48:16 (CD); 51:34 (VHS)
- Label: Circa
- Producer: James Biondolillo; Greg Kane

Hue and Cry chronology
Remote (1988)	Bitter Suite (1989)	Stars Crash Down (1991)

Bitter Suite was the third album, and the first live album, from the Scottish pop group Hue and Cry. It was released in 1989.

It was re-released as a double-album with their previous album Remote.

A video recording was also released on VHS.

== CD/vinyl/cassette track listing ==
1. "Mother Glasgow"
2. "The Man with the Child in His Eyes"
3. "Shipbuilding"
4. "Rolling Home"
5. "Peaceful Face"
6. "Widescreen"
7. "O God Head Hid"
8. "Looking For Linda"
9. "Remote"
10. "It Was a Very Good Year"
11. "'Round Midnight"
12. "Truth"

== VHS track listing ==
1. "Mother Glasgow"
2. "Labour of Love"
3. "The Man with the Child in His Eyes"
4. "Shipbuilding"
5. "Rolling Home"
6. "Peaceful Face"
7. "Widescreen"
8. "O God Head Hid"
9. "Looking For Linda"
10. "Remote"
11. "It Was a Very Good Year"
12. "'Round Midnight"
13. "Truth"
14. "Change Gonna Come"
