= Hue and Cry (band) =

Scottish pop duo

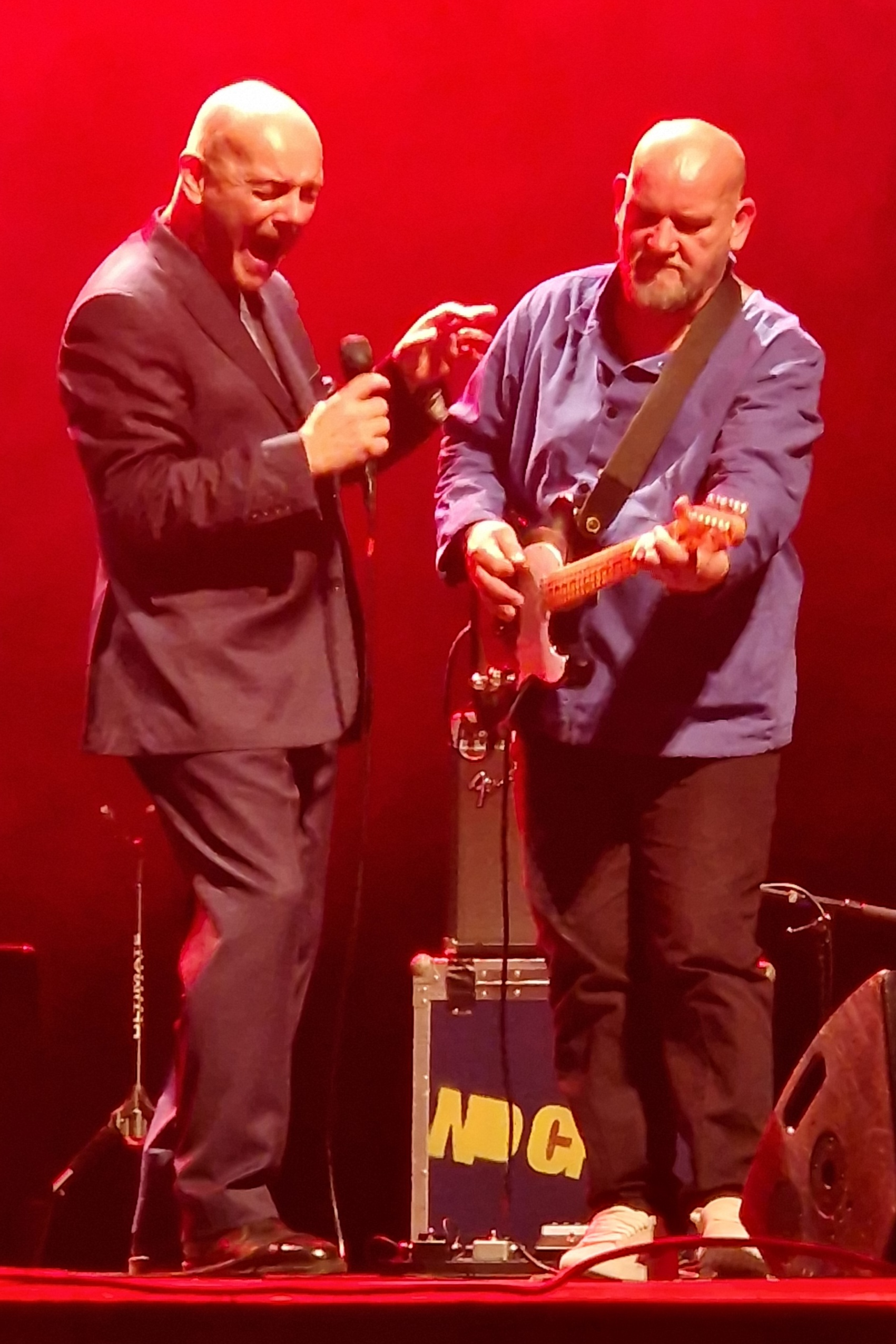
- Hue and Cry performing at the Floral Pavilion, Wallasey, Merseyside in November 2023

Background information
- Origin: Coatbridge, Lanarkshire, Scotland
- Genres: Blue-eyed soul, pop, sophisti-pop
- Years active: 1983–present
- Labels: Stampede, Circa, Fidelity, Linn, Blairhill
- Members: Pat Kane; Greg Kane
- Website: hueandcry.co.uk

Hue and Cry is a Scottish pop duo formed in 1983 in Coatbridge by the brothers Pat Kane and Greg Kane. The duo is best known for their 1987 single "Labour of Love".

== Career ==
Their first single "Here Comes Everybody" was released on a small Glasgow-based independent label, Stampede, in 1986. While not a hit, it attracted the interest of Virgin Records's subsidiary Circa which signed the duo in 1986. Their debut single for Circa was "I Refuse". Their second single and biggest hit was "Labour of Love" from the debut album Seduced and Abandoned. Other hits included "Looking for Linda" and "Violently (Your Words Hit Me)" — both from their second album Remote.

In the 1990s, the brothers embarked upon a period of musical experimentation. Their 1991 album Stars Crash Down embraced folk, country, Latin, and quartet jazz. Truth and Love (1992) was released on the brothers' own short-lived label Fidelity. Hue and Cry had a brief chart revival in 1993 with the release of the Circa compilation album Labour of Love – The Best of Hue and Cry, which included a Joey Negro remix of "Labour of Love".

1994 saw a collaboration with jazz arranger and composer, Richard Niles. This produced the album Showtime! and the single "Just Say You Love Me". Pat Kane continued to work with Niles sporadically on live concerts for BBC Radio 2 with the BBC Big Band. In 1996, Hue and Cry signed to the Scottish jazz and classical record label, Linn Records, for an intended trilogy of albums. First came JazzNotJazz, an album that mixed jazz with non-jazz sounds. The album was recorded in a week during the Glasgow Jazz Festival, enlisting the services of some of the jazz musicians visiting the city. They included Michael Brecker (tenor sax) and Randy Brecker (trumpet) — who had played on the Remote album — as well as guitarist Mike Stern (sidesman with Miles Davis), drummer Danny Gottlieb (Pat Metheny), and saxophonist Tommy Smith.

Next Move (1999) featured drum and bass, R&B, and Nuyorican Latin-funk. The album contained a cover of Prince's "Sign O' the Times", which they stripped bare and built up again as an aggressive bebop number. The intended third album on Linn Records was never produced, as the brothers concentrated on their solo projects — Pat with his writing and solo performing, and Greg with his music production.

=== Reformation ===
In April 2005, Hue and Cry made a comeback when they won the fourth-week heat of the ITV1 pop-competition show Hit Me Baby One More Time with a rendition of "Labour of Love" and a cover of Beyoncé's "Crazy in Love". They were beaten in the final by Shakin' Stevens.

The band followed this up with dates in Scotland, a piano–vocal spot in support of Jamie Cullum at the 'Live on the Lawn' festival in Aberdeenshire, and a set in front of 25,000 at Glasgow's Hogmanay party. Their concerts in 2006 and 2007 sold out. The band performed two nights at the West End festival in Glasgow in 2007, where they showcased piano–vocal versions of new and old songs. They played Retrofest at Culzean Castle on 2 September 2007, and headlined the Darvel Music Festival on 5 October. The duo showcased new tracks at a gig in Edinburgh Voodoo Rooms on 12 July 2008. At this time, the duo allowed fans exclusive access with the Hue and Cry Music Club through the official website.

On 15 September 2008, they released their Open Soul album, for which recording and mixing finished in 2007. The first single "The Last Stop" on digital download was released on 1 September and coincided with the 20th anniversary of the release of Remote. Their Open Soul tour had sold out dates in Inverness, Aberdeen, Glasgow, London, Manchester and Sheffield, beginning on 11 September 2008. On 1 December, the band released a second single "Heading for a Fall". They also opened for Al Green on 30 October. They completed a tour of House of Fraser stores and, in February 2009, embarked on another sell out UK tour, billed as "Open Soul...Open Road". On 9 February, EMI released a "Best of Collection" and the band released a third single called "Fireball." The band also launched the Hue and Cry Music Club.

May 2009 saw the band headline the "Burns an' a' that" festival in Ayrshire, and play an acoustic set in Aberdeen. In July 2009, the brothers supported Human League at Thetford Forest and, in November 2009, played at "Homecoming Live – The Final Fling". They released a Christmas album on 30 November 2009 titled Xmasday. Hue and Cry played sold out nights as part of the History City weekend on 18 and 19 December 2009.

A new Hue And Cry album, Hot Wire, was released on 19 March 2012 and the band played acoustic gigs in support of it. They also appeared on Jools Holland's BBC Radio 2 show, and played "Shipbuilding" on the Titanic memorial show for Radio 2 receiving praise from Holland as well as Dermot O'Leary and Jeremy Vine. They also appeared at the Isle of Wight Festival in 2012.

Hue and Cry appeared on an August 2012 edition of Celebrity Big Brother, Bit on the Side, singing "Labour of Love" at the end of the show. A further compilation album, A's and B's was released in 2012. They headed out on the road again in October 2012 with their band to play six shows in Scotland and performed further charity gigs towards the end of that year.

== Discography ==
- Seduced and Abandoned (1987)
- Remote (1988)
- Bitter Suite (1989)
- Stars Crash Down (1991)
- Truth and Love (1992)
- Showtime! (1994)
- Piano & Voice (1995)
- Jazz Not Jazz (1996)
- Next Move (1999)
- Open Soul (2008)
- Xmasday (2009)
- Hot Wire (2012)
- Remote: Major to Minor (2014)
- September Songs (2015)
- Pocketful of Stones (2017)
- Hue And Cry 40 (2024)
- Everybody (2026)
