= Pat Kane =

Scottish musician, journalist, political activist

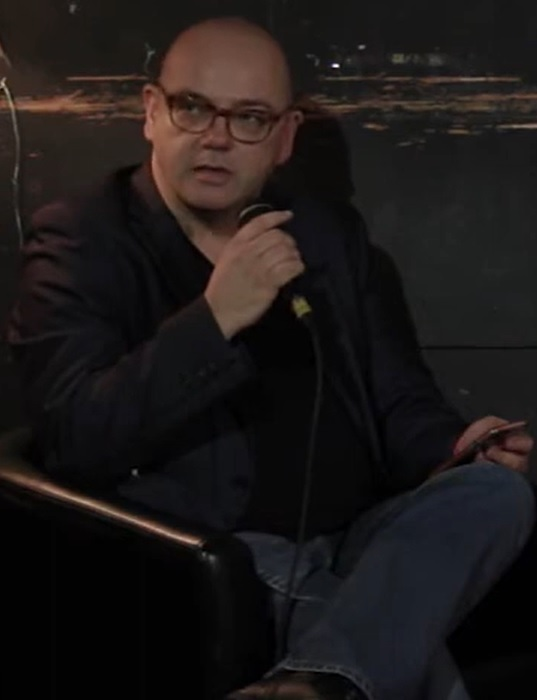
Pat Kane in 2015

Patrick Mark "Pat" Kane (born 10 March 1964) is a Scottish musician, journalist, political activist and one half of the pop duo Hue and Cry with his younger brother Greg.

Kane is a writer on political and cultural topics, and was an activist for Scottish self-government in the 1980s and 1990s. He helped found the organisation "Artists for an Independent Scotland". In 1990, he was elected Rector of the University of Glasgow for three years (defeating veteran Labour MP Tony Benn). He graduated from the university in 1985, earning an MA in English.

Whilst Rector at Glasgow, Kane had a column at the Glasgow University Guardian which was then edited by Iain Martin. Kane's copy was the subject of two notorious edits – a reference to the scholar Raymond Williams was altered to Kenneth Williams, and the sociologist Alvin Toffler to Alvin Stardust.

During the 1990s, he began working as an arts journalist, presenting several live discussion shows for Channel 4 and BBC2, and came third with BBC Radio Scotland series, Kane Over America for a Sony Award, in a category won by Allan Little. In 1999, Kane was one of the founding editors of the Sunday Herald newspaper. He occasionally writes for The Guardian. He is a regular columnist for the sister paper to the Sunday Herald, The National.

In 2004, Kane published The Play Ethic: A Manifesto for a Different Way of Living. The author description says he "runs seminars, talks and runs a website reaching out to people living the Play Ethic".

Kane was formerly married to Joan McAlpine, an SNP Member of the Scottish Parliament for the South of Scotland region.

Academic offices
Preceded by Winnie Madikizela-Mandela	Rector of the University of Glasgow; 1990–1993	Succeeded by Johnny Ball
