= Greg Kane (musician) =

Scottish musician

Greg Kane (born Gregory Philip Kane, 11 September 1966, Glasgow, Scotland) is a Scottish musician, and co-member of Hue and Cry.

A classically trained pianist, prior to Hue and Cry's formation, he was the saxophonist in Valerie and the Week of Wonders, which featured the Scottish artist Gerard Burns on vocals and Brian McFie, who went on to be the lead guitarist with The Big Dish.

Kane played on, and co-produced Jim Diamond's album, City of Soul, released by Camino Records (catalogue number CAMCD40, release date 3 October 2011). All proceeds from this album of soul covers benefited the children's charity, Radio Clyde Cash For Kids.
