= Scottish Affairs Select Committee =

UK House of Commons select committee

The Scottish Affairs Select Committee is a select committee of the House of Commons in the Parliament of the United Kingdom. The remit of the committee is to examine the expenditure, administration and policy of the Office of the Secretary of State for Scotland (and prior to that, the Scottish Office), and relations with the Scottish Parliament. It also looks at the administration and expenditure of the Advocate General for Scotland.

Unlike the Scottish Grand Committee, MPs from constituencies outside Scotland can, and do, sit on the Scottish Affairs Committee.

== Predecessors ==
Before 1992 there was not consistent Select Committee scrutiny of Scottish affairs. In 1968 a committee was formed partly in response to the growth of Scottish nationalism, although the committee was closed down by a reorganisation of select committees by Edward Heath's government in 1972. In 1979 Norman St John Stevas the Leader of the House under Margaret Thatcher's government instituted a Select Committee system that closely mirrored government departments in order to have better parliamentary scrutiny of the government. This was again discontinued in 1987 although there was an alternative Scottish Affairs committee composed of opposition MPs.

== Chairs ==
Committee chairs include those listed below.

Name	Start	End	Party	Constituency
Donald Dewar	1 January 1980	16 January 1981	Labour	Glasgow Garscadden
Robert Hughes	21 January 1981	27 January 1982	Labour	Aberdeen North
David Lambie	27 January 1982	16 March 1992	Labour	Central Ayrshire (1982–1983)
David Lambie	27 January 1982	16 March 1992	Labour	Cunninghame South (1983–1992)
William McKelvey	27 April 1992	21 March 1997	Labour	Kilmarnock and Loudoun
David Marshall	14 July 1997	11 May 2001	Labour	Glasgow Shettleston
Irene Adams	19 July 2001	11 April 2005	Labour	Paisley North
Mohammad Sarwar	11 July 2005	6 May 2010	Labour	Glasgow Central
Ian Davidson	10 June 2010	30 March 2015	Labour Co-op	Glasgow South West
Pete Wishart	18 June 2015	30 May 2024	Scottish National Party	Perth and North Perthshire
Patricia Ferguson	12 September 2024	present	Labour	Glasgow West

== Membership ==
Membership of the committee is as follows:

Member	Party	Constituency
Patricia Ferguson MP (chair)	Labour	Glasgow West
Maureen Burke MP	Labour	Glasgow North East
John Cooper MP	Conservative	Dumfries and Galloway
Dave Doogan MP	Scottish National Party	Angus and Perthshire Glens
Lillian Jones MP	Labour	Kilmarnock and Loudoun
Douglas Lumsden MP	Conservative	Aberdeen South
Angus MacDonald MP	Liberal Democrats	Inverness, Skye and West Ross-shire
Douglas McAllister MP	Labour	West Dunbartonshire
Susan Murray MP	Liberal Democrats	Mid Dunbartonshire
Kenneth Stevenson MP	Labour	Airdrie and Shotts
Kirsteen Sullivan MP	Labour	Bathgate and Linlithgow

=== Changes since 2024 ===
Date	Outgoing Member & Party	Constituency	→	New Member & Party	Constituency	Source
16 June 2025	Stephen Flynn MP (Scottish National Party)	Aberdeen South	→	Dave Doogan MP (Scottish National Party)	Angus and Perthshire Glens	Hansard
6 July 2026	Jack Rankin MP (Conservative)	Windsor	→	Douglas Lumsden MP (Conservative)	Aberdeen South	Hansard
21 October 2026	Harriet Cross MP (Conservative)	Gordon and Buchan	→	John Cooper MP (Conservative)	Dumfries and Galloway	Hansard
26 October 2026	Elaine Stewart MP (Labour)	Ayr, Carrick and Cumnock	→	Kenneth Stevenson MP (Labour)	Airdrie and Shotts	Hansard

== 2019–2024 Parliament ==
The chair was elected on 27 January 2020. Members of the committee were announced on 2 March 2020, but Patrick Grady (Glasgow North) objected to the appointment, claiming that not enough Scottish MPs had been selected. The debate was adjourned, and the committee was eventually constituted on 4 May 2020, when the list of proposed members was put before the house without objection.

Member	Party	Constituency
Pete Wishart MP (chair)	Scottish National Party	Perth & North Perthshire
Mhairi Black MP	Scottish National Party	Paisley and Renfrewshire South
Andrew Bowie MP	Conservative	West Aberdeenshire and Kincardine
Deidre Brock MP	Scottish National Party	Edinburgh North and Leith
Wendy Chamberlain MP	Liberal Democrats	North East Fife
Alberto Costa MP	Conservative	South Leicestershire
Jon Cruddas MP	Labour	Dagenham and Rainham
David Duguid MP	Conservative	Banff and Buchan
Sally-Ann Hart MP	Conservative	Hastings and Rye
John Lamont MP	Conservative	Berwickshire, Roxburgh and Selkirk
Liz Twist MP	Labour	Blaydon

=== Changes 2019–2024 ===
Date	Outgoing Member & Party	Constituency	→	New Member & Party	Constituency	Source
15 June 2020	David Duguid MP (Conservative)	Banff and Buchan	→	Douglas Ross MP (Conservative)	Moray	Hansard
8 November 2022	Andrew Bowie MP (Conservative)	West Aberdeenshire and Kincardine	→	David Duguid MP (Conservative)	Banff and Buchan	Hansard
9 January 2023	Mhairi Black MP (SNP)	Paisley and Renfrewshire South	→	Dr Philippa Whitford MP (SNP)	Central Ayrshire	Hansard
21 February 2023 (Note: Unusually, this motion was voted on by MPs. David Linden objected the nomination due to Labour nominating a Liberal Democrat MP to one of their vacant positions. Since both appointments were within the same motion, both were voted on. Members of select committees for each party are decided within the party, and parties can choose any MP to serve for one of their seats, including from outside of their party. The appointment passed with 383 votes to 37.)	Jon Cruddas MP (Labour)	Dagenham and Rainham	→	Christine Jardine MP (Liberal Democrats)	Edinburgh West	Hansard
21 February 2023	Liz Twist MP (Labour)	Blaydon	→	Andrew Western MP (Labour)	Stretford and Urmston	Hansard
22 May 2023	John Lamont MP (Conservative)	Berwickshire, Roxburgh and Selkirk	→	Mark Menzies MP (Conservative) (Note: Whip suspended from 17 April 2024 to dissolution.)	Fylde	Hansard
18 September 2023	Deidre Brock MP (SNP)	Edinburgh North and Leith	→	Alan Brown MP (SNP)	Kilmarnock and Loudoun	Hansard
18 September 2023	Dr Philippa Whitford MP (SNP)	Central Ayrshire	→	Anum Qaisar MP (SNP)	Airdrie and Shotts	Hansard
22 January 2024	Andrew Western MP (Labour)	Stretford and Urmston	→	Michael Shanks MP (Labour)	Rutherglen and Hamilton West	Hansard

== 2017–2019 Parliament ==
The election of the chair took place on 12 July 2017, with the members of the committee being announced on 11 September 2017.

Member	Party	Constituency
Pete Wishart MP (chair)	Scottish National Party	Perth and North Perthshire
Deidre Brock MP	Scottish National Party	Edinburgh North and Leith
David Duguid MP	Conservative	Banff and Buchan
Hugh Gaffney MP	Labour	Coatbridge, Chryston and Bellshill
Christine Jardine MP	Liberal Democrats	Edinburgh West
Ged Killen MP	Labour and Co-op	Rutherglen and Hamilton West
John Lamont MP	Conservative	Berwickshire, Roxburgh and Selkirk
Paul Masterton MP	Conservative	East Renfrewshire
Danielle Rowley MP	Labour and Co-op	Midlothian
Tommy Sheppard MP	Scottish National Party	Edinburgh East
Ross Thomson MP	Conservative	Aberdeen South

=== Changes 2017–2019 ===
Date	Outgoing Member & Party	Constituency	→	New Member & Party	Constituency	Source
22 October 2018	Paul Masterton MP (Conservative)	East Renfrewshire	→	Kirstene Hair MP (Conservative)	Angus	Hansard
1 April 2019	Kirstene Hair MP (Conservative)	Angus	→	Paul Masterton MP (Conservative)	East Renfrewshire	Hansard
21 October 2019	Christine Jardine MP (Liberal Democrats)	Edinburgh West	→	Jamie Stone MP (Liberal Democrats)	Caithness, Sutherland and Easter Ross	Hansard

== 2015–2017 Parliament ==
The chair was elected on 18 June 2015, with members being announced on 6 July 2015.

Member	Party	Constituency
Pete Wishart MP (chair)	Scottish National Party	Perth and North Perthshire
David Anderson MP	Labour	Blaydon
Kirsty Blackman MP	Scottish National Party	Aberdeen North
Christopher Chope MP	Conservative	Christchurch
Jim Cunningham MP	Labour	Coventry South
Margaret Ferrier MP	Scottish National Party	Rutherglen and Hamilton West
Stephen Hepburn MP	Labour	Jarrow
Chris Law MP	Scottish National Party	Dundee West
Dr Dan Poulter MP	Conservative	Central Suffolk and North Ipswich
John Stevenson MP	Conservative	Carlisle
Maggie Throup MP	Conservative	Erewash

=== Changes 2015–2017 ===
Date	Outgoing Member & Party	Constituency	→	New Member & Party	Constituency	Source
5 September 2016	David Anderson MP (Labour)	Blaydon	→	Ian Murray MP (Labour)	Edinburgh South	Hansard
5 September 2016	Kirsty Blackman MP (SNP)	Aberdeen North	→	Deidre Brock MP (SNP)	Edinburgh North and Leith	Hansard
28 November 2016	Maggie Throup MP (Conservative)	Erewash	→	Anna Soubry MP (Conservative)	Broxtowe	Hansard
23 January 2017	Dr Dan Poulter MP (Conservative)	Central Suffolk and North Ipswich	→	Craig Williams MP (Conservative)	Cardiff North	Hansard

== 2010–2015 Parliament ==
The chair was elected on 10 June 2010, with members being announced on 12 July 2010.

Member	Party	Constituency
Ian Davidson MP (chair)	Labour and Co-op	Glasgow Govan
Fiona Bruce MP	Conservative	Congleton
Cathy Jamieson MP	Labour	Kilmarnock and Loudoun
Jim McGovern MP	Labour	Dundee West
Mark Menzies MP	Conservative	Fylde
David Mowat MP	Conservative	Warrington South
Fiona O'Donnell MP	Labour	East Lothian
Alan Reid MP	Liberal Democrats	Argyll and Bute
Lindsay Roy MP	Labour	Glenrothes
Julian Smith MP	Conservative	Skipton and Ripon
Dr Eilidh Whiteford MP	Scottish National Party	Banff and Buchan

=== Changes 2010–2015 ===
Date	Outgoing Member & Party	Constituency	→	New Member & Party	Constituency	Source
29 November 2010	Mark Menzies MP (Conservative)	Fylde	→	Mike Freer MP (Conservative)	Finchley and Golders Green	Hansard
29 November 2010	Julian Smith MP (Conservative)	Skipton and Ripon	→	Simon Reevell MP (Conservative)	Dewsbury	Hansard
25 October 2011	Cathy Jamieson MP (Labour)	Kilmarnock and Loudoun	→	Iain McKenzie MP (Labour)	Inverclyde	Hansard
25 October 2011	Fiona O'Donnell MP (Labour)	East Lothian	→	Graeme Morrice MP (Labour)	Livingston	Hansard
23 January 2012	Graeme Morrice MP (Labour)	Livingston	→	Pamela Nash MP (Labour)	Airdrie and Shotts	Hansard
5 November 2012	David Mowat MP (Conservative)	Warrington South	→	Michael Crockart MP (Liberal Democrat)	Edinburgh West	Hansard
28 January 2013	Fiona Bruce MP (Conservative)	Congleton	→	Eleanor Laing MP (Conservative)	Epping Forest	Hansard
28 January 2013	Iain McKenzie MP (Labour)	Inverclyde	→	Graeme Morrice MP (Labour)	Livingston	Hansard
4 February 2013	Mike Freer MP (Conservative)	Finchley and Golders Green	→	Sir James Paice MP (Conservative)	South East Cambridgeshire	Hansard
6 January 2014	Eleanor Laing MP (Conservative)	Epping Forest	→	Vacant		Hansard
14 July 2014	Vacant		→	Mark Menzies MP (Conservative)	Fylde	Hansard
23 February 2015	Lindsay Roy MP (Labour)	Glenrothes	→	Iain McKenzie MP (Labour)	Inverclyde	Hansard

== See also ==
- Parliamentary committees of the United Kingdom
