= Eilidh Whiteford =

SNP politician

Scottish National Party spokesperson for Work & Pensions in the House of Commons
- In office 20 May 2015 – 9 June 2017
- Leader: Angus Robertson
- Preceded by: Position established
- Succeeded by: Mhairi Black

Member of Parliament for Banff and Buchan
- In office 6 May 2010 – 3 May 2017
- Preceded by: Alex Salmond
- Succeeded by: David Duguid

Personal details
- Born: 24 April 1969 (age 57) Aberdeen, Scotland
- Party: Scottish National Party
- Spouse: Stephen Smith
- Education: University of Glasgow
- Occupation: Lecturer, Charity Manager

Academic background
- Thesis: Political histories, politicised spaces: discourses of power in the fiction of Alasdair Gray (1997)

Eilidh Whiteford (born 24 April 1969) is a Scottish National Party (SNP) politician who served as the Member of Parliament for the constituency of Banff and Buchan from 2010 to 2017.

In the 2010–15 Parliament, she was the SNP's spokesperson for Women; for Fishing, Food and Rural Affairs; and for International Development. During the 2015–17 Parliament, she sat on the Scottish Affairs Select Committee and was the SNP's Westminster Spokesperson for Social Justice, Work and Pensions.

== Biography ==
Whiteford was born in 1969 in Aberdeen and grew up in Macduff, Banffshire. She attended Banff Academy and has been active in the SNP since joining her local branch in 1986 during the run-up to Alex Salmond's election in 1987. She graduated from Glasgow University with First Class Honours in English and Scottish Literature, followed by postgraduate studies in Canada and Scotland that led to a PhD in 1998. While at university, she became involved with the Federation of Student Nationalists, first as National Organiser and then as President, sitting on the SNP National Executive and acting as party spokesperson on Higher Education. In 1992, she worked in the Peterhead office for Alex Salmond.

She returned to the North East in early 1998 to work for Allan Macartney MEP. After Macartney died in August 1998, she worked for Ian Hudghton MEP until the 1999 elections, and later helped new MSP Irene McGugan establish a constituency office in the first term of the Scottish Parliament.

She became a lecturer at Glasgow University in 1999 teaching Scottish Literature and developing access routes into higher education for mature students (in Glasgow University's adult and continuing education department).

In 2001, she moved into a campaigning role in the voluntary sector as Co-ordinator of the Scottish Carers' Alliance, a network of carer, disability and children's organisations working for the rights of and to support people looking after elderly, sick or disabled relatives or friends at home.

In 2003 she moved to Oxfam where she worked as a policy adviser and campaigns manager for over six years in a role that took her to many parts of the world. Closer to home, Whiteford was actively involved in the Make Poverty History campaign in 2005 and helped establish the Scottish Fair Trade Forum. In 2006 she was chair of Global Call to Action Against Poverty Scotland. She also promoted development issues with members of the Scottish Parliament, and immediately after the Make Poverty History campaign, became Oxfam's Scottish Campaigns Manager. She left this post in 2009, to stand as a SNP candidate for Banff and Buchan. She sat on the Board of Turning Point Scotland until 2011.

Whiteford maintains her interests in social policy and global issues as a volunteer for several charities, and previously sat on the Board Jubilee Scotland.

== Member of Parliament ==
Whiteford was first elected for Banff and Buchan on 6 May 2010. She made her maiden speech at 20:47 on 7 June 2010 on Constitution and Home Affairs stating that "a very great deal is at stake in our constitutional arrangements. Banff and Buchan's local economy depends heavily on agriculture, fisheries and energy and the manufacturing industries associated with them". She held SNP's Westminster Spokesperson posts: for Women 15 June 2010 – 20 May 2015; for Fishing, Food and Rural Affairs 15 June 2010 – 20 May 2015; and for International Development 15 June 2010 – 20 May 2015. She sat on the Scottish Affairs Select Committee 12 July 2010 – 30 March 2015.

In the 2015 general election, Whiteford was re-elected as the MP for Banff and Buchan, winning 60.2% of the vote in the constituency and increasing the SNP's majority to 31.5%. She was the Shadow SNP Westminster Group Leader (Social Justice and Welfare) 21 May 2015 – 3 May 2017.

In the 2017 election, she lost the seat to David Duguid, one of her former schoolmates, of the Conservative party.

=== Complaint against Ian Davidson ===
On 25 October 2011, it emerged that Clerks appointed to the Scottish Affairs Select Committee had raised concerns with the Clerk of Committees, the most senior official, alleging that Labour Party MP Ian Davidson (Glasgow South West) had threatened to inflict "a doing" upon Whiteford, in the event that details of the committee's discussions during a private session were leaked to the media. Following the allegations Whiteford withdrew from the committee and a formal complaint was made by the SNP Parliamentary Leader, Angus Robertson, to the Speaker of the House.

At the next session of the Scottish Affairs Select Committee on 26 October, Davidson made a public apology "for any offence that might have been caused" by his remarks; simultaneously denying that the remarks had been in any way threatening.

However Liberal Democrat, Labour and Conservative committee members all stated that no threats were made.

Gail Lythgoe, a member of staff for SNP MSP Joan McAlpine and then married to Humza Yousaf, emailed a Women's Equality group supporting Whiteford and alleging that Davidson has a history of bullying and called on them to demonstrate against him whilst asking them not to reveal the partisan call for its instigation. The email was leaked and Lythgoe publicly apologised for making unsubstantiated allegations, which the Labour Party alleged could be an SNP dirty tricks campaign against Davidson leading it to conduct its investigation.

After an investigation, the Labour Party came to the conclusion that the allegations amounted to a "smear campaign" against Davidson due to the forthcoming investigations chaired by Davidson into the SNP's referendum proposal.

Parliament of the United Kingdom
Preceded by Alex Salmond	Member of Parliament for Banff and Buchan; 2010–2017	Succeeded by David Duguid
