= 2021 Airdrie and Shotts by-election =

2021 UK parliament by-election

- 13 May 2021

Airdrie and Shotts constituency
- Turnout: 34.3% (▼28.0 pp)
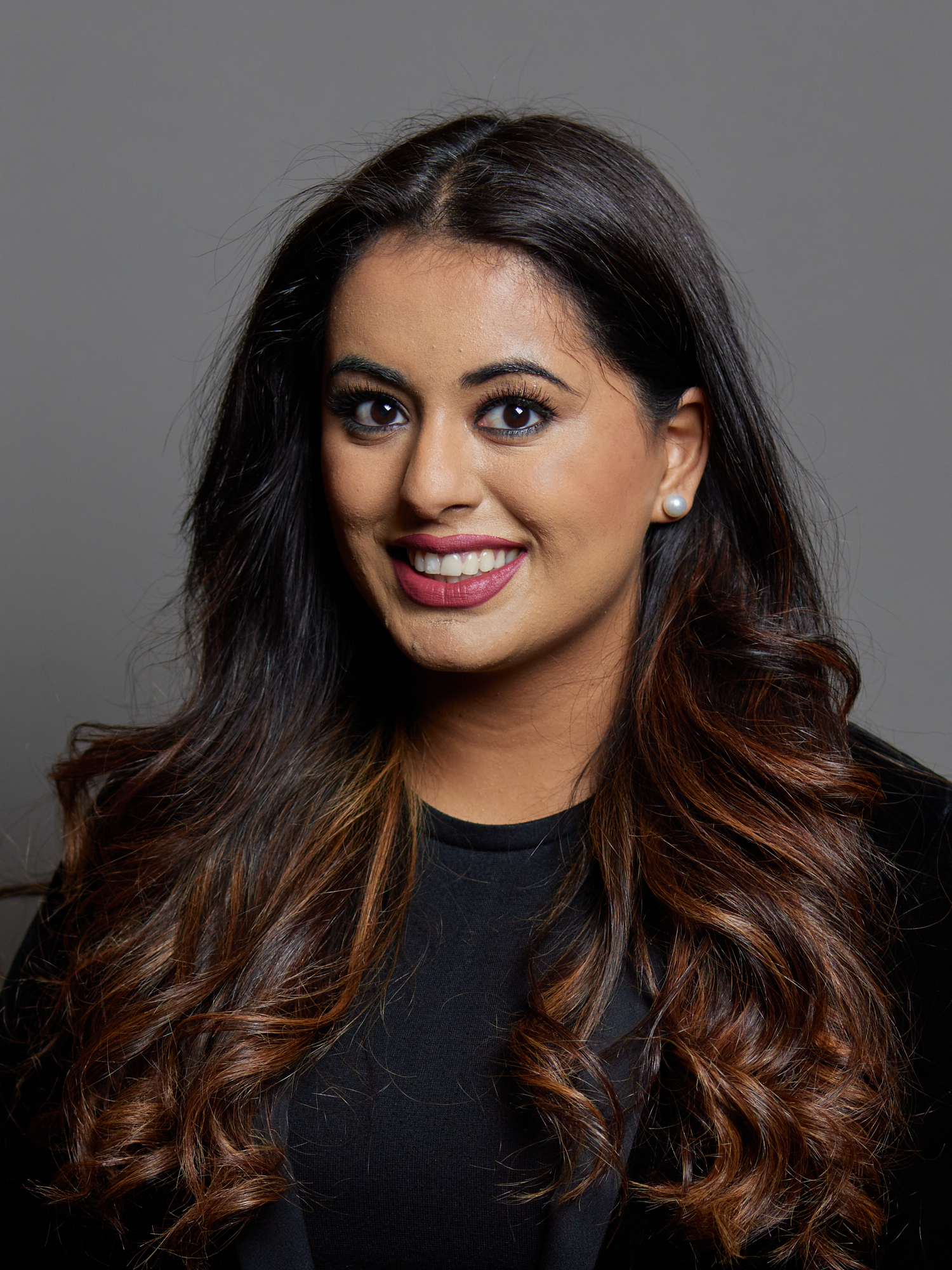

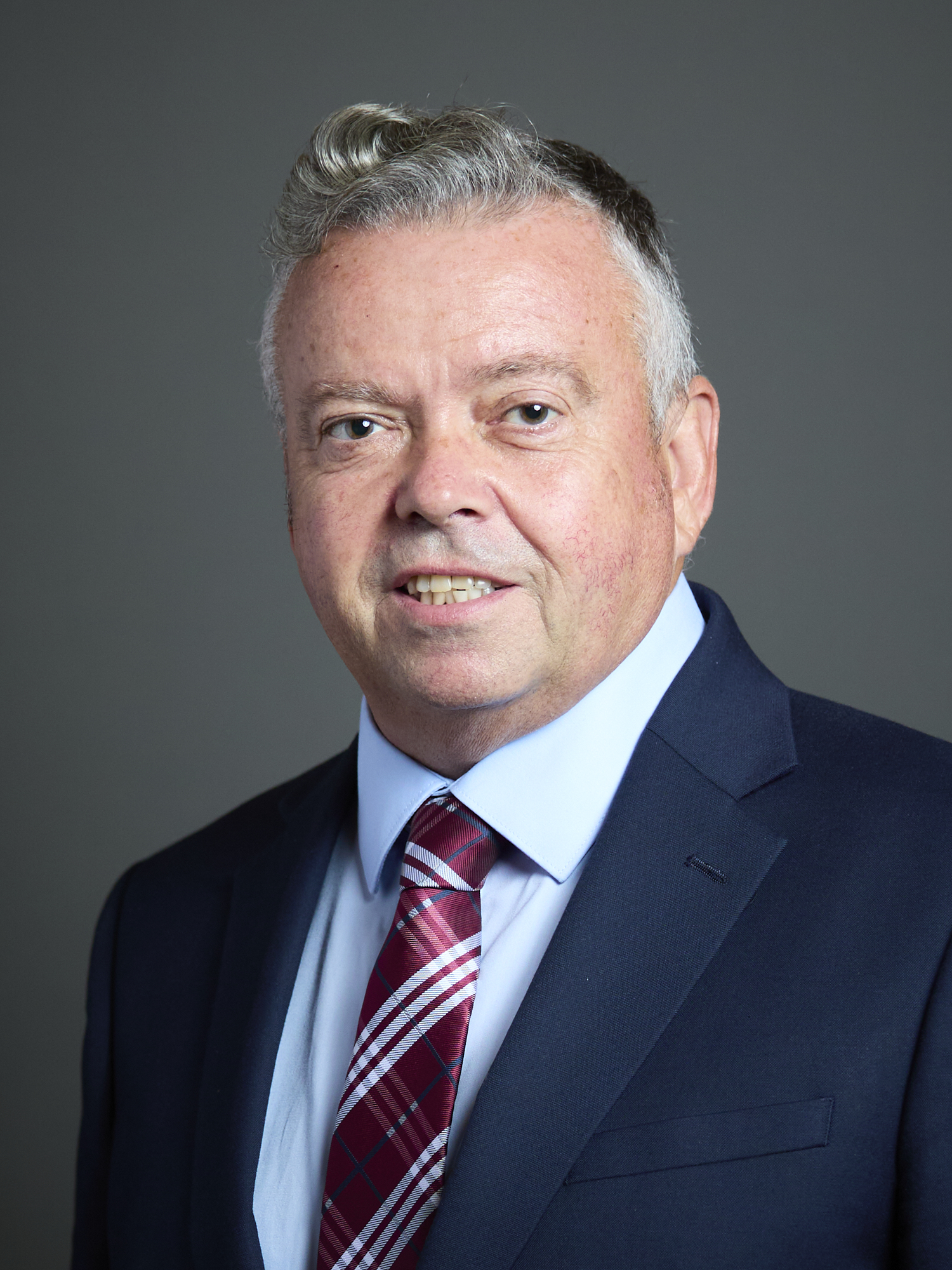
	First party	Second party	Third party
			Con
Candidate	Anum Qaisar-Javed	Kenneth Stevenson	Ben Callaghan
Party	SNP	Labour	Conservative
Popular vote	10,129	8,372	2,812
Percentage	46.4%	38.4%	12.9%
Swing	▲1.4 pp	▲6.5 pp	▼4.7 pp
MP before election
Neil Gray
SNP
Elected MP
Anum Qaisar-Javed
SNP

A by-election for the United Kingdom parliamentary constituency of Airdrie and Shotts was held on 13 May 2021 following the resignation of incumbent Scottish National Party (SNP) MP Neil Gray to run for the corresponding seat—which he subsequently won—in the 2021 Scottish Parliament election. Anum Qaisar-Javed held the seat for the SNP with a decreased majority but an increased share of the vote.

This was the first UK parliamentary by-election in Scotland for nearly 10 years, with the previous one having been the 2011 Inverclyde by-election.

== Background ==
Airdrie and Shotts is a generally working-class, urban seat, and contains the towns of Airdrie, Calderbank, Chapelhall, Glenmavis and Shotts. Previous MPs for the seat include the former Labour cabinet ministers Helen Liddell and John Reid, both of whom now sit in the House of Lords.

Neil Gray was elected as the Scottish National Party (SNP) MP for Airdrie and Shotts at the 2015 general election, and was re-elected in both 2017 and 2019. In November 2020, Gray announced that he would be resigning as an MP in order to try and win a seat in the Scottish Parliament constituency of the same name at the 2021 Scottish Parliament election; this was necessitated by SNP rules banning its members from sitting as an MSP and an MP at the same time. On 23 March 2021, he made his final speech in the House of Commons, and was appointed Steward and Bailiff of the Manor of Northstead a day later. The by-election date of 13 May 2021, a week after the Scottish Parliament elections, was chosen to reduce COVID-19 transmission risk.

== Candidates ==
Jonathan Stanley had already been announced as the Scottish Unionist Party candidate for a potential Airdrie and Shotts by-election in September 2020.

On 18 March 2021, Anum Qaisar-Javed was selected as the SNP's candidate for the by-election. She was a Labour Party member until at least 2014, and was the general secretary of Muslim Friends of Labour. She had previously worked as a caseworker to an SNP MSP and as a parliamentary researcher to an SNP MP. At the time of declaring her candidacy she was a modern studies teacher.

On 25 March 2021, local councillor Kenneth Stevenson was selected by Scottish Labour to contend the by-election. He beat a former MP for the constituency and the chief executive of Scotland in Union, Pamela Nash.

The Scottish Liberal Democrat candidate was Stephen Arrundale, the party's treasurer. He had previously stood as a candidate for Midlothian in the 2019 General Election.

== Result ==
2021 Airdrie and Shotts by-election
Party	Candidate	Votes	%	±%
SNP	Anum Qaisar-Javed	10,129	46.4	+1.4
Labour	Kenneth Stevenson	8,372	38.4	+6.5
Conservative	Ben Callaghan	2,812	12.9	−4.7
Liberal Democrats	Stephen Arrundale	220	1.0	−2.6
SDP	Neil Manson	151	0.7	N/A
Scottish Unionist	Jonathan Stanley	59	0.3	N/A
Reform	Martyn Greene	45	0.2	N/A
UKIP	Donald Mackay	39	0.2	N/A
Majority		1,757	8.0	−5.1
Turnout		21,827	34.3	−28.0
Registered electors		63,705		
SNP hold		Swing	−2.5	

== 2019 result ==
General election 2019: Airdrie and Shotts
Party	Candidate	Votes	%	±%
SNP	Neil Gray	17,929	45.0	+7.4
Labour	Helen McFarlane	12,728	31.9	−5.2
Conservative	Lorraine Nolan	7,011	17.6	−5.6
Liberal Democrats	William Crossman	1,419	3.6	+1.5
Green	Rosemary McGowan	685	1.7	N/A
Majority		5,201	13.1	+12.6
Turnout		39,772	62.3	+3.1
Registered electors		64,011		
SNP hold		Swing	+6.3	
