= Kenneth Stevenson (politician) =

British politician

Kenneth Stevenson MP
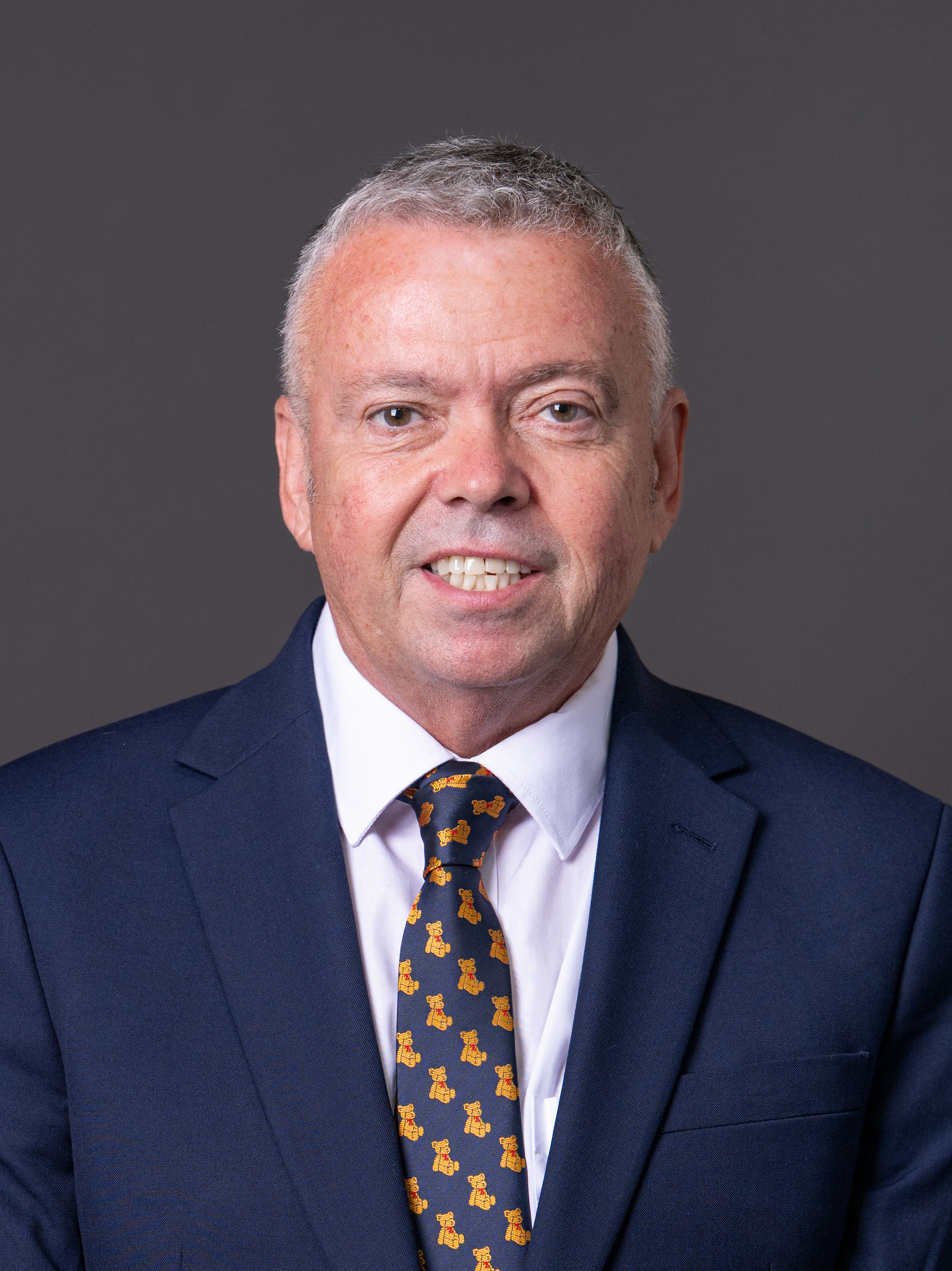
- Official portrait, 2026

Member of Parliament for Airdrie and Shotts
- Incumbent
- Assumed office 4 July 2024
- Preceded by: Anum Qaisar
- Majority: 7,547 (20.6%)

Member of North Lanarkshire Council for Fortissat
- In office 4 May 2017 – 6 August 2024
- Succeeded by: Clare Quigley

Personal details
- Born: 1963 or 1964 (age 62–63)
- Party: Labour
- Education: Open University (BSc)
- Occupation: Politician; lecturer; engineer

Kenneth Stevenson (born 1963 or 1964) is a Scottish Labour politician and engineer who has served as Member of Parliament (MP) for Airdrie and Shotts since 2024.

== Early life and career ==
Stevenson studied engineering at Calderhead High School in Shotts from 1975 to 1980. He received a Bachelor of Science degree from the Open University.

Stevenson has worked as an engineer at companies including BAE Systems, Hyster and Terex. He became an engineering lecturer at Anniesland College in 2006, which later merged with Glasgow Clyde College.

== Political career ==
Stevenson was elected as a Member of North Lanarkshire Council for Fortissat in 2017 and was re-elected in 2022. As councillor, he served as convener of the Communities Committee and Community Safety Partnership Forum between 2022 and 2024.

Stevenson was elected as MP for Airdrie and Shotts at the 2024 general election, defeating his SNP predecessor Anum Qaisar. He had previously contested the 2021 by-election for the constituency, in which he came second to Qaisar.

In Labour's candidate selection for both elections, Stevenson had defeated Pamela Nash, the Labour MP for the constituency between 2010 and 2015. Following his election victory, Stevenson resigned from the Council in August 2024.

In the 2025 Labour Party deputy leadership election, Stevenson nominated Bell Ribeiro-Addy.

== Personal life ==
Stevenson owns a second home in Spain.
