= Scotland in Union =

Scottish unionist campaign group

Scotland in Union (SIU)
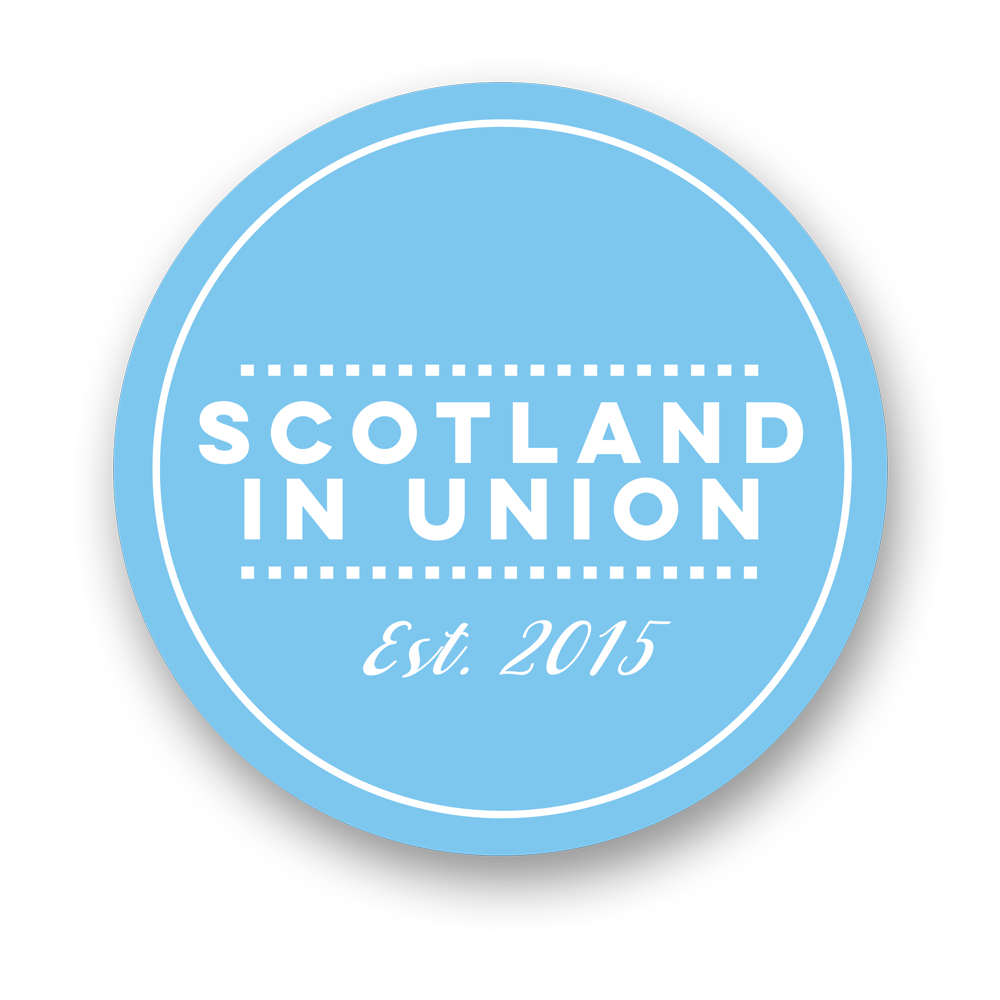
- Abbreviation: SIU
- Founded: 6 March 2015; 11 years ago
- Type: Campaign group
- Headquarters: Glasgow
- Members: 37,000 (2025)
- Founder: Alastair Cameron
- Website: www.scotlandinunion.co.uk

Scotland in Union (SIU) is a campaign group which aims to keep Scotland within the United Kingdom. It was set up in 2015, and has 37,000 signed-up supporters as of 2025.

== History ==
Scotland in Union launched on 6 March 2015, with the aim of promoting Scotland's place within the UK. It is a not-for-profit private company limited by guarantee, registered in Scotland.

The organisation was initially led by its founder, Alastair Cameron. In January 2017, Scottish Labour's former Justice spokesperson Graeme Pearson was announced as Chief Executive. In August 2017, former Labour MP Pamela Nash took over the role until 2024, following which Cameron returned as chair of the group.

In 2016, Scottish National Party MP Natalie McGarry apologised and paid compensation, after sending a tweet about the leadership of SIU. McGarry later described the tweet as 'a serious mistake'. SIU's founder, Alastair Cameron, announced that the compensation money would be distributed to three charities: mental health charity Combat Stress, genocide awareness charity Aegis Trust and children's charity Lumos.

In late 2017, a new campaign group called UK Unity separated from Scotland in Union. The new organisation supported Brexit and was critical of Scotland in Union's "agnostic" stance on the issue. Cameron distanced himself from UK Unity, comparing the new organisation to individuals "working for a medium-sized company going and setting up their own venture".

In December 2017, SIU informed the police and the Information Commissioner's Office that they had suffered a data theft. Subsequent to this incident, the Electoral Commission carried out an investigation of SIU's donations. Following the investigation, the Commission said it was "satisfied" that SIU had complied with its requirements.

== Campaigns and activities ==
=== Polling ===
SIU regularly commissions opinion polling on Scottish independence, with most being phrased similarly to the 2016 EU membership referendum, with "Remain" and "Leave" as possible answers, as opposed to the 2014 independence referendum's "Yes" and "No" options. In 2021, political academics at the London School of Economics carried out a study which demonstrated a statistically significant increase in support for the union when asked using the former formation. This was also demonstrated by a YouGov poll in March 2022, in which the sample was split and half were asked a yes/no question and half were asked a remain/leave question. In 2019, the SNP depute leader Keith Brown claimed that the remain/leave forumulation was "a deliberate bid to confuse independence with Brexit". In March 2026, a poll using this formulation indicated that 60% of people in Scotland would vote for Scotland to remain part of the UK.

Polling commissioned by SIU has also asked when people think another referendum on Scotland leaving the UK should be held, if at all; and has asked people about priorities for the Scottish Government. One example of the referendum timing question was in May 2022, when the polling found that only 29% of Scots wanted another referendum before the end of 2023. Another poll in September 2022 found that only 7 per cent of Scots think independence is among the most important issues for the Scottish Government, a result which was repeated in September 2024.

Other areas often covered by SIU-commissioned polling include people's views on what the Scottish Government's priorities should be; and people's views on the performance of the Scottish Government in various devolved areas. In September 2025, the latest time that these questions were asked, train services was the only area in which people were more positive than negative about Scottish Government performance.

A poll conducted by Survation in March 2025, commissioned by Scotland in Union, surveyed people in Scotland about their views regarding security, nuclear deterrence, and international alliances. The results indicated that 47% of respondents felt Scotland is more secure as part of the United Kingdom, compared to 35% who believed security would be maintained if the UK were dissolved. On the issue of Trident, the UK’s nuclear deterrent, 56% supported its retention, while 22% opposed it. The poll also found strong support for the UK’s international memberships, with 80% valuing Nato, 76% backing UN Security Council membership, and 74% favouring G7 participation. Scotland in Union highlighted these findings amid ongoing debates over Scottish independence and the SNP’s opposition to nuclear weapons.

In May 2026, SIU commissioned polling from Survation on tactical voting and Scottish Government priorities following the 2026 Scottish Parliament election. The polling found that among voters who said they had voted tactically, the most common reason given was to prevent an SNP victory, while just 10% of respondents said another independence referendum should be the Scottish Government's top priority.

=== Economics-focused campaigns ===
To coincide with the annual publication of the Government Expenditure and Revenue Scotland figures, known as GERS, SIU introduced a new method to break down the 'UK dividend' from which Scotland benefits, for local communities across Scotland. In addition, Pamela Nash – a former chief executive of the organisation – has written articles in The Scotsman to highlight the benefits to Scottish public spending which come from sharing across the UK.

SIU has also highlighted the Scottish Government's Export Statistics Scotland publication, to increase awareness of the proportion of Scotland's trade with the rest of the UK and to call for more open acknowledgement of Scotland's trade situation.

In late 2022, after the UK Supreme Court had ruled that the Scottish Parliament does not have the power to legislate for a referendum on Scottish independence, SIU launched a campaign to demonstrate alternative uses for the £20m the SNP administration was still apparently allocating to a referendum in 2023. After the SNP announced that the £20m was in fact being diverted to the fuel insecurity fund, which was one of the suggestions SIU had made, this change was welcomed by Nash.

In 2023, SIU launched the 'End The Spend' campaign in response to the Scottish Government's expenditure on activities relating to independence.

=== Tactical voting campaigns ===
SIU's first campaign was to encourage tactical voting against the Scottish National Party during the 2015 UK general election. It has carried out similar campaigns during Scottish and UK general election periods throughout its existence, including the 2019 and 2024 UK general elections.

Following the 2021 Scottish Parliament election, Sir John Curtice commented that tactical voting probably played a part in the SNP's failure to gain a majority. According to a Scottish Election Study by academics across the UK, released in May 2022, "significant numbers of people voted for both the Conservatives and Labour as part of efforts to defeat the SNP and strengthen the Union".

Ahead of the 2026 Scottish Parliament election, SIU launched a tactical voting campaign aimed at encouraging pro-UK voters to support the candidate considered most likely to defeat the SNP in individual constituencies. The campaign included a tactical voting website, billboard advertising, digital advertising, campaign videos and leaflet distribution across Scotland. The organisation later stated that its tactical voting website had been used more than 100,000 times during the campaign.

=== Devolved functions campaigns ===
SIU has run a series of campaigns to highlight poor performance by nationalist administrations. These have mostly used data obtained via Freedom of Information (Scotland) Act 2002 requests, and have included items covering health and income inequalities and cancer waiting times.

In December 2022, SIU worked with Survation on a poll in which respondents from Scotland expressed that the SNP was performing poorly on healthcare, education and the economy.

In September 2024, another FOI request from SIU revealed that NHS Scotland has paid out over £11 million in compensation to cancer patients whose treatment was delayed.

=== Billboards, advertising and print media ===
SIU has used billboards on several occasions, including in 2016, when SIU paid for a large billboard advert near the SNP conference in Glasgow, urging Nicola Sturgeon to "change the record" on independence and rule out another vote. In 2017 in Aberdeen, again outside the SNP conference, SIU organised an advertising van with the message 'Referendumb' that was unveiled to awaiting press as SNP members gathered for the conference. A billboard campaign was launched again in 2021 in the run up to the 2021 Scottish Parliament election.

In September 2018, SIU launched a 'Yawn' campaign, using newspaper advertisements. This was a campaign aimed at people who are 'tired' of the constant constitutional debate. The campaign gained additional media attention when a Police Scotland Twitter account tweeted in apparent support of the campaign, before deleting their tweet.

=== Events ===
SIU has held various political and social events, mostly in Scotland. The events have ranged from talks about Scotland's economy, to Burns Night celebrations and events to mark St Andrew's Day, to a parliamentary reception in at the House of Commons.

Scotland in Union's events have been joined and supported by politicians from across the main pro-UK parties, including Ruth Davidson, Anas Sarwar, Christine Jardine, David Mundell, Andrew Bowie, Mike Rumbles, Jackie Baillie, Murdo Fraser, Alistair Carmichael, Johann Lamont, Ian Murray, Alex Cole-Hamilton, Willie Rennie, Wendy Chamberlain, Jamie Stone, Michael Shanks, Meghan Gallacher Donald Cameron, Blair McDougall, Jackson Carlaw, Susan Murray Stephen Kerr and Daniel Johnson.

== See also ==
- Better Together
