= Banff and Buchan (UK Parliament constituency) =

UK Parliament constituency (since 1983)

Coordinates: 57.472°N 2.451°W

- Former county constituency for the House of Commons
- Boundary of Banff and Buchan in Scotland
- Major settlements: Peterhead, Fraserburgh, Turriff

1983–2024
- Created from: Aberdeenshire East and Banffshire
- Replaced by: Aberdeenshire North and Moray East

Banff and Buchan was a constituency of the House of Commons, located in the north-east of Scotland within the Aberdeenshire council area. It elected one Member of Parliament at least once every five years using the first-past-the-post system of voting.

The seat was most recently held by David Duguid of the Scottish Conservatives from 2017; until then the Scottish National Party (SNP) had held the seat since 1987, with the then First Minister of Scotland Alex Salmond representing the seat until 2010 and Eilidh Whiteford until 2017.

Further to the completion of the 2023 Periodic Review of Westminster constituencies, the seat was subject to boundary changes which involved expansion into eastern parts of Moray. As a consequence, it was renamed Aberdeenshire North and Moray East, which was first contested at the 2024 general election.

== Constituency profile ==
A mostly rural constituency, it took in the towns of Fraserburgh, Peterhead and Turriff, and the main industries are fishing and tourism.

The Aberdeenshire council area as a whole voted against Scottish independence in 2014.

61% of people in constituency are estimated to have voted in favour of leaving the European Union in the 2016 Brexit referendum.

In 2010, Eilidh Whiteford succeeded Alex Salmond as the MP for Banff and Buchan, but the SNP vote share fell below 50% for the first time since 1992, due to a strong challenge by the Conservative Party. In the 2015 general election, the SNP achieved its best-ever result in the constituency, with Whiteford winning a 60.2% share of the vote and increasing her majority by more than 10,300 votes.

In 2017, the constituency saw the second-largest swing to the Conservatives in all of Scotland (20.2%), bested only by the swing achieved by Colin Clark in defeating Salmond in the neighbouring seat of Gordon (20.4%). Observers attributed this to anger at the SNP's opposition to Brexit and support for a second independence referendum. After the election, The Guardian reported, "In the coastal town of Peterhead, locals at the Waverley hotel were toasting Salmond's first defeat since being elected as an MP in 1987. Murdo MacKenzie, 51, a former fisherman, said there was a lot of anger about Sturgeon's stance on Europe. 'Europe is dictating our fishing quotas. I've voted SNP all my life but if you take the power away from Westminster and hand it to Brussels, how is that independence?'"

At the 2019 general election, Banff and Buchan's Conservative vote share bucked the Scottish trend and increased by 2.1%, increasing David Duguid's majority to over 4,000 votes and taking over 50% of the vote share.

== Boundaries ==
Map of boundaries 2005-2024

1983–1997: Banff and Buchan District.

1997–2005: The Banff and Buchan District electoral divisions of Banff and Portsoy, Deveron, Fraserburgh North, Fraserburgh South, Mid Buchan, Peterhead North, Peterhead South, and Ugie, Cruden and Boddam.

2005–2024: The Aberdeenshire Council wards of Durn, Banff West and Boyndie, Banff, Aberchirder, Macduff, Gamrie King Edward, Buchan North, Fraserburgh West, Fraserburgh North, Fraserburgh East, Fraserburgh South, Buchan North East, South Buchan, Central Buchan, Lonmay and St Fergus, Mintlaw Old Deer, Mintlaw Longside, Boddam Inverugie, Blackhouse, Buchanhaven, Peterhead Central Roanheads, Clerkhill, Dales Towerhill, Cruden, Turriff West, Turriff East, Upper Ythan, and Fyvie Methlick.

As created in 1983, the constituency replaced part of East Aberdeenshire and part of Banffshire.

New boundaries were used for the 2005 general election, as recommended by the Fifth Periodical Report of the Boundary Commission for Scotland, and the constituency was one of five covering the Aberdeenshire and Aberdeen City council areas. The Banff and Buchan constituency was entirely within the Aberdeenshire area, covering a northern portion of it. To the south, Gordon included part of the Aberdeenshire area and part of the Aberdeen City area. Further south, West Aberdeenshire and Kincardine continues to be entirely within the Aberdeenshire area and Aberdeen North and Aberdeen South are entirely within the Aberdeen City area.

As of its abolition, the Banff and Buchan constituency continued to include the port towns of Peterhead and Fraserburgh, along with Turriff which was formerly within the Gordon constituency.

== Members of Parliament ==
Election	Member	Party
1983	Albert McQuarrie	Conservative
1987	Alex Salmond	SNP
2010	Eilidh Whiteford	SNP
2017	David Duguid	Conservative

== Election results ==
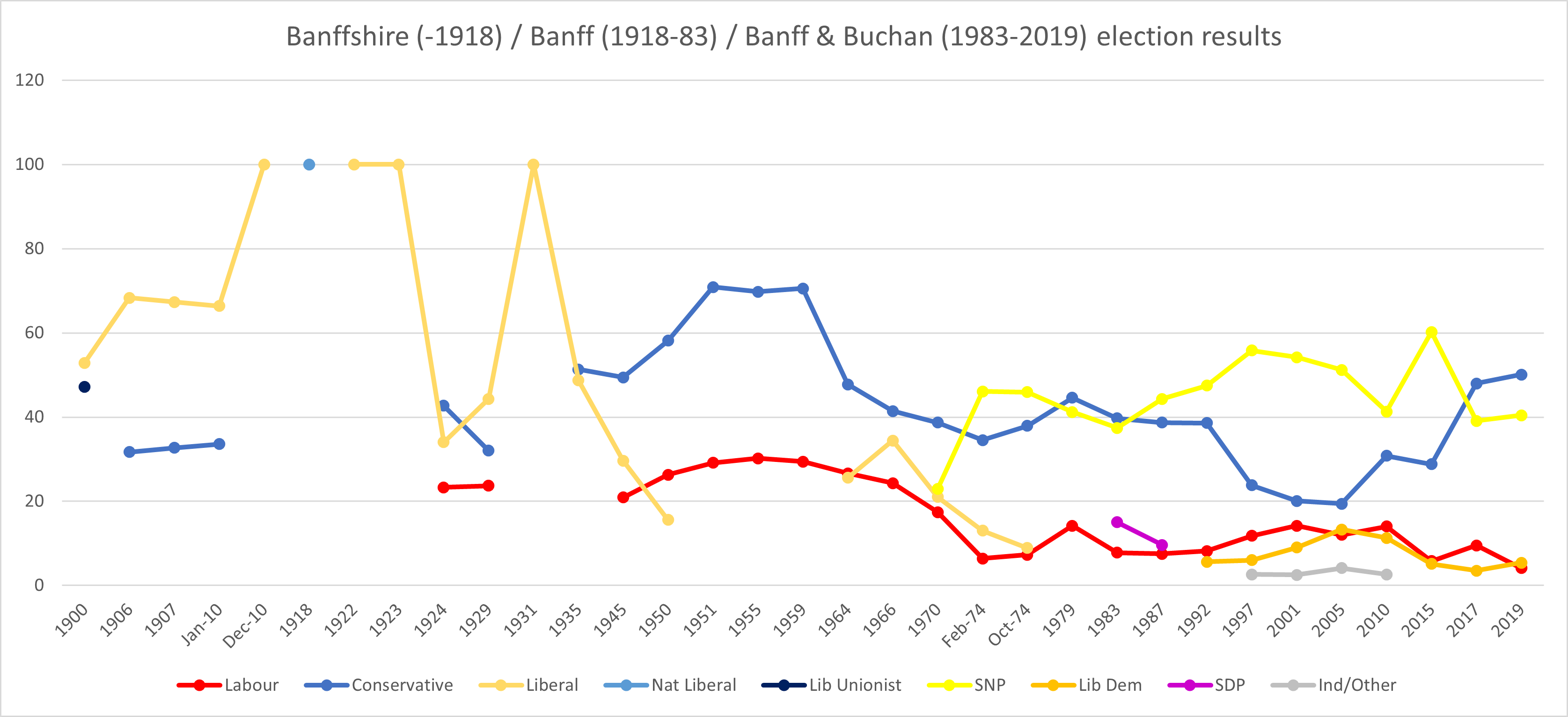
Banffshire (-1918) / Banff (1918-83) / Banff & Buchan (1983-2019) election results

=== Elections in the 2010s ===
General election 2019: Banff and Buchan
Party	Candidate	Votes	%	±%
Conservative	David Duguid	21,182	50.1	+2.1
SNP	Paul Robertson	17,064	40.4	+1.3
Liberal Democrats	Alison Smith	2,280	5.4	+1.9
Labour	Brian Balcombe	1,734	4.1	−5.4
Majority		4,118	9.7	+0.8
Turnout		42,260	63.4	+1.8
Conservative hold		Swing	+0.4	

General election 2017: Banff and Buchan
Party	Candidate	Votes	%	±%
Conservative	David Duguid	19,976	48.0	+19.2
SNP	Eilidh Whiteford	16,283	39.1	−21.1
Labour	Caitlin Stott	3,936	9.5	+3.7
Liberal Democrats	Galen Milne	1,448	3.5	−1.6
Majority		3,693	8.9	N/A
Turnout		41,643	61.6	−4.9
Conservative gain from SNP		Swing	+20.2	

General election 2015: Banff and Buchan
Party	Candidate	Votes	%	±%
SNP	Eilidh Whiteford	27,487	60.2	+18.9
Conservative	Alex Johnstone	13,148	28.8	−2.0
Labour	Sumon Hoque^{1}	2,647	5.8	−8.2
Liberal Democrats	David Evans	2,347	5.1	−6.2
Majority		14,339	31.4	+18.9
Turnout		45,629	66.5	+6.7
SNP hold		Swing	+10.5	

^{1}: After nominations were closed, Hoque was suspended from the Labour Party when he was charged with multiple driving offences.

General election 2010: Banff and Buchan
Party	Candidate	Votes	%	±%
SNP	Eilidh Whiteford	15,868	41.3	−9.9
Conservative	Jimmy Buchan	11,841	30.8	+11.4
Labour	Glen Reynolds	5,382	14.0	+2.0
Liberal Democrats	Galen Milne	4,365	11.3	−2.0
BNP	Richard Payne	1,010	2.6	New
Majority		4,027	12.5	−19.3
Turnout		38,466	59.8	+3.2
SNP hold		Swing	−10.6	

The swing of 10.6% to the Conservatives in Banff and Buchan was the largest swing in Scotland at the 2010 general election.

=== Elections in the 2000s ===
General election 2005: Banff and Buchan
Party	Candidate	Votes	%	±%
SNP	Alex Salmond	19,044	51.2	+2.3
Conservative	Sandy Wallace	7,207	19.4	−2.1
Liberal Democrats	Eleanor Anderson	4,952	13.3	−0.6
Labour	Rami Okasha	4,476	12.0	−1.5
Christian Vote	Victor Ross	683	1.8	New
UKIP	Kathleen Kemp	442	1.2	+0.3
Scottish Socialist	Steve Will	412	1.1	−0.3
Majority		11,837	31.8	−2.3
Turnout		37,216	56.6	+2.2
SNP hold		Swing	+1.1	

General election 2001: Banff and Buchan
Party	Candidate	Votes	%	±%
SNP	Alex Salmond	16,710	54.2	−1.6
Conservative	Sandy Wallace	6,207	20.1	−3.7
Labour	Ted Harris	4,363	14.2	+2.4
Liberal Democrats	Douglas Herbison	2,769	9.0	+3.0
Scottish Socialist	Alice Rowan	447	1.5	New
UKIP	Eric Davidson	310	1.0	New
Majority		10,503	34.1	+2.1
Turnout		30,806	54.4	−14.3
SNP hold		Swing	+1.1	

=== Elections in the 1990s ===
General election 1997: Banff and Buchan
Party	Candidate	Votes	%	±%
SNP	Alex Salmond	22,409	55.8	+4.9
Conservative	William Frain-Bell	9,564	23.8	−10.9
Labour	Megan Harris	4,747	11.8	+3.2
Liberal Democrats	Neil Fletcher	2,398	6.0	+0.1
Referendum	Alan Buchan	1,060	2.6	New
Majority		12,845	32.0	+23.1
Turnout		40,178	68.7	−2.5
SNP hold		Swing	+11.5	

General election 1992: Banff and Buchan
Party	Candidate	Votes	%	±%
SNP	Alex Salmond	21,954	47.5	+3.2
Conservative	Sandy Manson	17,846	38.6	−0.1
Labour	Brian Balcombe	3,803	8.2	+0.7
Liberal Democrats	Rhona Kemp	2,588	5.6	−4.0
Majority		4,108	8.9	+3.3
Turnout		46,191	71.2	+0.4
SNP hold		Swing	+1.7	

=== Elections in the 1980s ===
General election 1987: Banff and Buchan
Party	Candidate	Votes	%	±%
SNP	Alex Salmond	19,462	44.3	+6.9
Conservative	Albert McQuarrie	17,021	38.7	−1.0
SDP	George Burness	4,211	9.6	−5.4
Labour	James Livie	3,281	7.5	−0.3
Majority		2,441	5.6	N/A
Turnout		43,975	70.8	+3.8
SNP gain from Conservative		Swing	+3.9	

General election 1983: Banff and Buchan
Party	Candidate	Votes	%	±%
Conservative	Albert McQuarrie	16,072	39.7	−3.0
SNP	Douglas Henderson	15,135	37.4	−3.1
SDP	Edward Needham	6,084	15.0	
Labour	Ian Lloyd	3,150	7.8	−9.1
Majority		937	2.3	+0.1
Turnout		40,441	67.0	
Conservative win (new seat)				

Parliament of the United Kingdom
Preceded by Galloway and Upper Nithsdale	Constituency represented by the Leader of the Scottish National Party in Westminster; 2001-2007	Succeeded by Moray
