= David Duguid (politician) =

Scottish Conservative Party politician

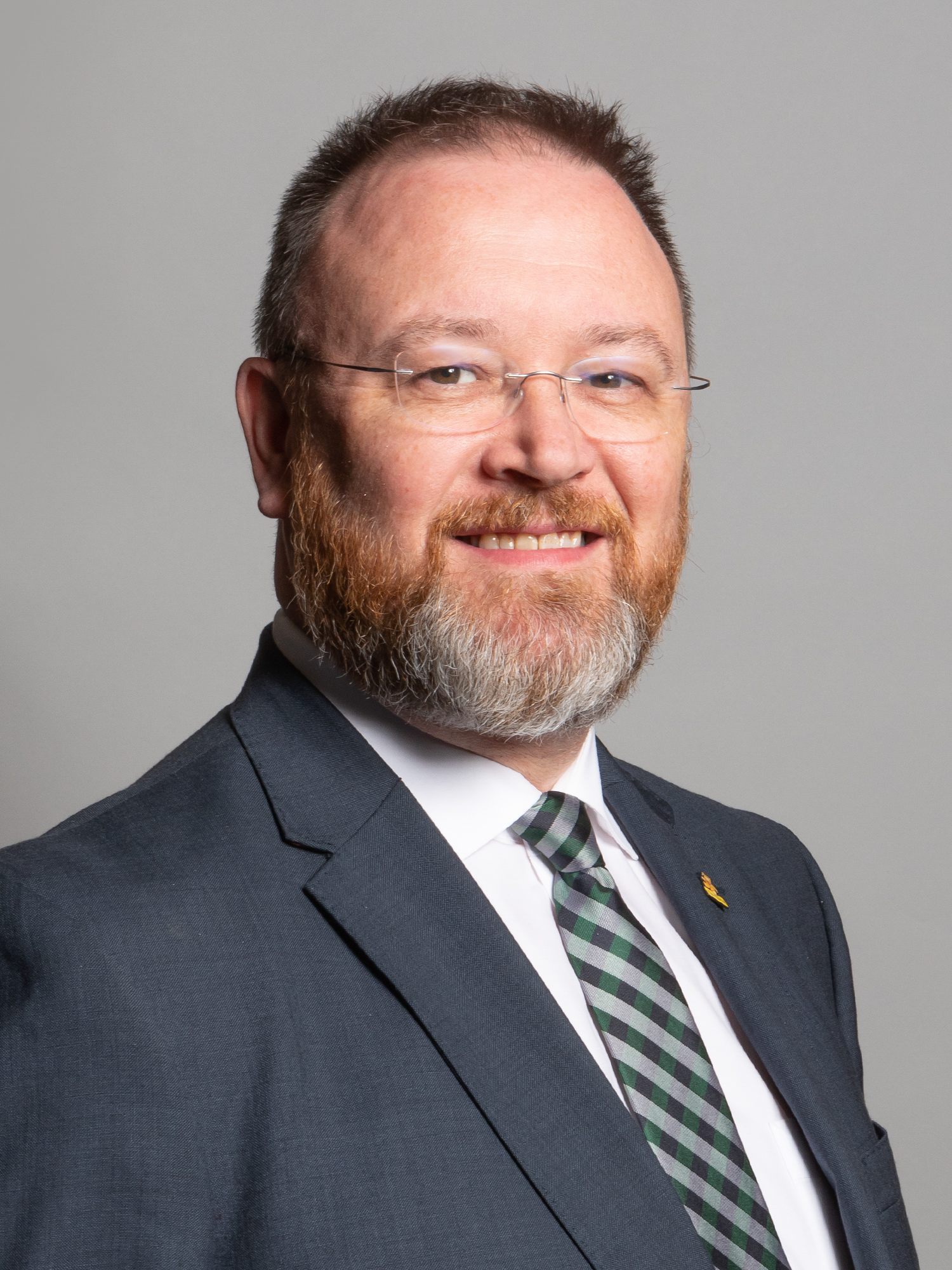
- Official portrait, 2020

Parliamentary Under-Secretary of State for Scotland
- In office 20 September 2022 – 27 October 2022 Serving with The Lord Offord of Garvel
- Prime Minister: Liz Truss
- Preceded by: Iain Stewart
- Succeeded by: John Lamont
- In office 2 June 2020 – 16 September 2021 Serving with Iain Stewart
- Prime Minister: Boris Johnson
- Preceded by: Douglas Ross
- Succeeded by: The Lord Offord of Garvel

Member of Parliament for Banff and Buchan
- In office 8 June 2017 – 30 May 2024
- Preceded by: Eilidh Whiteford
- Succeeded by: Constituency abolished

Personal details
- Born: 8 October 1970 (age 55) Turriff, Aberdeenshire, Scotland
- Party: Conservative
- Education: Robert Gordon University
- Website: www.davidduguid.com

David James Duguid (born 8 October 1970) is a Scottish Conservative politician who was the Member of Parliament (MP) for Banff and Buchan from June 2017 to May 2024. Duguid's victory ended thirty years of Scottish National Party control of the seat.

Duguid served as Parliamentary Under-Secretary of State for Scotland from September to October 2022. He previously served in this role from June 2020 to September 2021.

== Background ==
He was educated at Banff Academy and Robert Gordon University, where he studied chemistry. Before entering politics, Duguid worked in the oil and gas industry for 25 years, working in a wide range of roles, in various global locations and for different companies, including BP and Hitachi.

== Political career ==
Duguid was first elected in 2017, beating the incumbent, Eilidh Whiteford by 3,693 votes. His win represented the largest overturned majority of the election night in the UK. He was re-elected in the December 2019 election., as the only Scottish Conservative MP with an increased majority and more than 50% of the vote.

In June 2020, Duguid accepted a position as Parliamentary Under-Secretary of State for Scotland and a Government whip, succeeding Douglas Ross.

Duguid left the government in September 2021 and was appointed Fisheries Envoy.

Duguid and Alister Jack were the only two Scottish Conservative MPs (out of six) who voted in support of Boris Johnson in the June 2022 confidence vote. Duguid later resigned as Trade Envoy on 6 July 2022.

He was made a Scotland Office Minister under Liz Truss, whose campaign for leadership of the Tory party he had supported, but was removed from this post after her resignation after a few weeks.

Duguid has been accused of concealing a conflict of interest by repeatedly opposing a windfall tax on fossil fuel companies when his wife is a significant shareholder in BP.

Following boundary changes, Duguid intended to contest the successor seat of Aberdeenshire North and Moray East at the 2024 United Kingdom general election. In May 2024, as the election campaign began, he announced that he was in hospital, rehabilitating from a spinal stroke, but intended to continue as the Conservative candidate. However, although he still wished to stand and felt he was recovering sufficiently, he announced on 5 June 2024 that he had been deselected by The Scottish Conservatives Management Board on 'medical grounds' nonetheless and was not put forward to contest the seat. In the election, his replacement candidate Douglas Ross was narrowly defeated by Seamus Logan from the Scottish National Party. After the election, Duguid said that he could have "won his seat from hospital".

Parliament of the United Kingdom
Preceded by Eilidh Whiteford	Member of Parliament for Banff and Buchan; 2017–2024	Constituency abolished
