= Pamela Nash =

British Labour Party politician

Pamela Nash MP
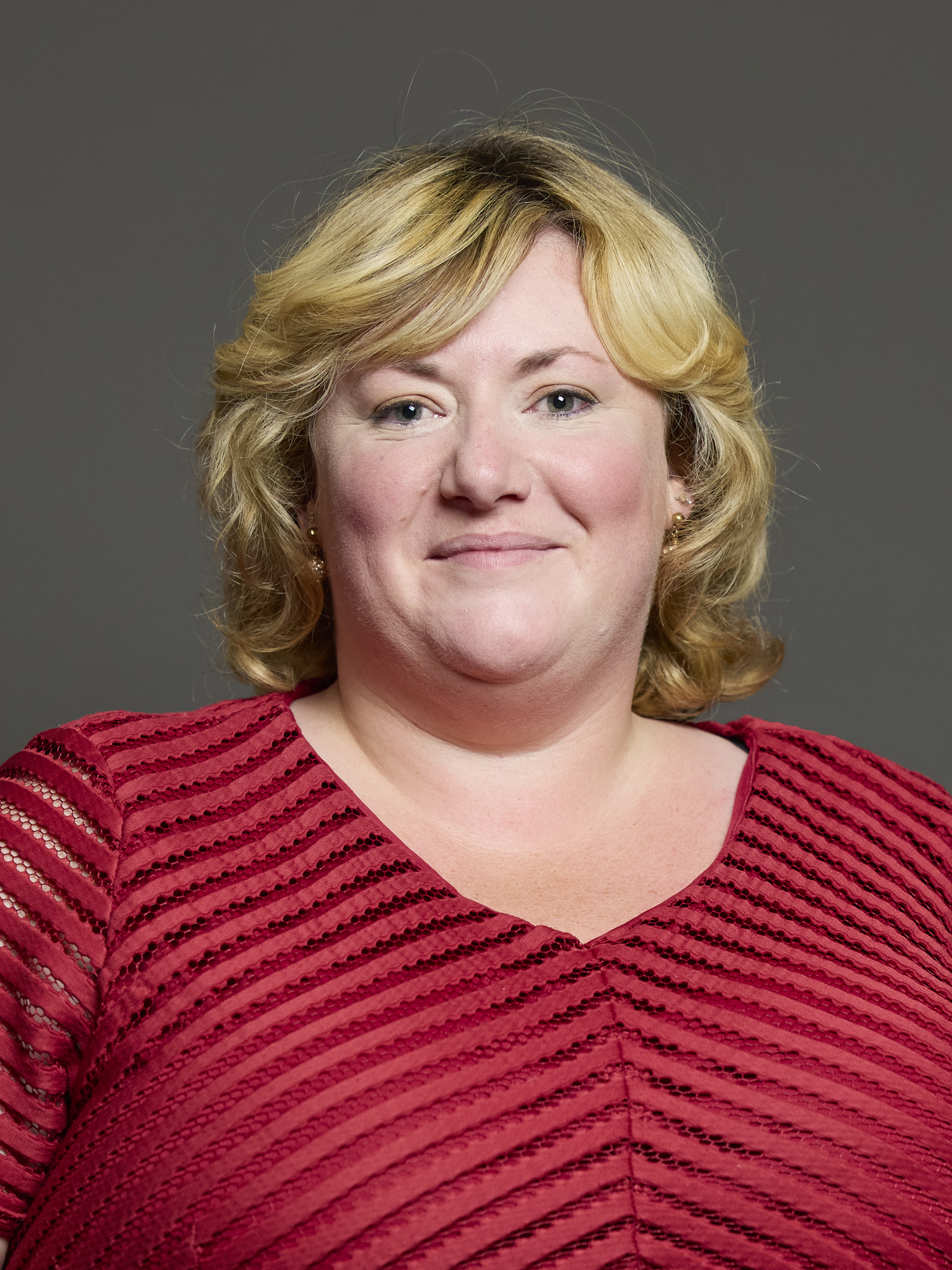
- Official portrait, 2024

Member of Parliament
- Incumbent
- Assumed office 4 July 2024
- Preceded by: Marion Fellows
- Constituency: Motherwell, Wishaw and Carluke
- Majority: 7,085 (18.1%)
- In office 6 May 2010 – 30 March 2015
- Preceded by: John Reid
- Succeeded by: Neil Gray
- Constituency: Airdrie and Shotts

Personal details
- Born: Pamela Ann Catherine Nash; 24 June 1984 (age 42) Airdrie, North Lanarkshire, Scotland
- Party: Labour
- Education: University of Glasgow (MA)
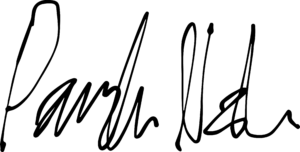
- Signature

Pamela Ann Catherine Nash (born 24 June 1984) is a Scottish Labour Party politician who has served as the Member of Parliament (MP) for Motherwell, Wishaw and Carluke since 2024. She previously was Chief Executive of Scotland in Union, a campaign group launched in March 2015 to help keep Scotland within the United Kingdom. Between 2010 and 2015 she was the Labour MP for Airdrie and Shotts.

== Early life and career ==
Pamela Nash was born in Airdrie, North Lanarkshire, and educated locally at St Margaret's High School, Airdrie and Chapelhall. Nash lost her mother and stepfather when she was 17.

She spent her first summer after high school volunteering at a school in Nyeri, Kenya, and followed this up with a placement in Uganda during her time at university. She studied politics at the University of Glasgow, specialising in human rights and international development.

Nash was the parliamentary officer for the Young Fabians and a member of the Scottish Youth Parliament, where she was on the executive committee and was the convenor of the External Affairs Committee. She interned for John Reid for one year as his constituency assistant and subsequently was employed for a period of three years as his parliamentary assistant.

== Political career ==
Nash was selected as the Labour Party candidate from an all-women shortlist which, at the time, proved to be a contentious issue. The constituency chairman, Brian Brady resigned over the issue. Nevertheless, 80% of the constituency Labour Party took part in the selection process. She was elected as the Member of Parliament for Airdrie and Shotts in 2010, taking over from John Reid. She had a majority of 12,408 votes over the SNP candidate, and at the age of 25, was the youngest MP in the House of Commons, also called Baby of the House. Then-Scottish Labour Party leader, Iain Gray said she had a "big future in Scottish politics".

Nash was the Parliamentary Private Secretary to the then Shadow Secretary of State for International Development, Jim Murphy. She was previously Parliamentary Private Secretary to Margaret Curran as Shadow Secretary of State for Scotland and to Vernon Coaker as Shadow Secretary of State for Northern Ireland. She served on the Finance Bill 2011 Public Bill Committee. Nash was a member of the Science and Technology Select Committee, the Scottish Affairs Select Committee and the Parliamentary Space Committee.

Following the death of the MP for Inverclyde, David Cairns, she was elected as the Chair of the All-Party Parliamentary Group for HIV and AIDS. She was also the Treasurer of the All-Party Parliamentary Group for Multiple Sclerosis and the Secretary of the All-Party Parliamentary Group on Sustainable Housing. Nash also founded and chaired the All-Party Parliamentary Group on Youth Unemployment.

In September 2010, Nash decided to support David Miliband in the Labour Party leadership election. On 2 December 2010, Nash took part in a BBC debate on age differences in politics and the wider society with the Conservative MP Bill Cash. Nash pledged to oppose the repeal of the Hunting Act 2004 which banned hunting of wild mammals with hounds.

Nash has campaigned on issues such as Blacklisting in employment, breaches of the National Minimum Wage, closure of local police stations and the Bedroom tax.

Nash was narrowly reselected by the Airdrie and Shotts CLP to contest her seat at the 2015 UK general election. A total of 55 members voted for her to be reselected, out of 101 members who attended the October 2013 ballot, with 37 opposed. At the 2015 general election however, Nash lost her seat to Neil Gray of the Scottish National Party, who won by a majority of 8,779 votes.

In August 2017, it was announced that Nash would be the next Chief Executive of Scotland in Union, in succession to Graeme Pearson.

In 2021, Nash attempted to be selected as the Labour candidate for the Airdrie and Shotts parliamentary by-election; however, she was unsuccessful, losing the nomination to Kenneth Stevenson. Despite a swing towards Labour, the SNP retained the seat.

On 20 April 2023, Nash was announced as the official Scottish Labour prospective parliamentary candidate for Motherwell, Wishaw and Carluke at the 2024 general election. She defeated the incumbent SNP MP for the predecessor seat, Marion Fellows, and was elected by a majority of 7,085 votes.

In the 2025 British cabinet reshuffle, Nash was appointed parliamentary private secretary at the Ministry of Defence. She resigned in June 2026 following John Healey's resignation as Defence Secretary as well as the subsequent resignation of Armed Forces Minister, Al Carns, on the same day.

Parliament of the United Kingdom
Preceded by John Reid	Member of Parliament for Airdrie and Shotts; 2010–2015	Succeeded by Neil Gray
Preceded by Chloe Smith	Baby of the House; 2010–2015	Succeeded by Mhairi Black
