= Neil Gray =

Scottish politician (born 1986)

Neil Gray MSP
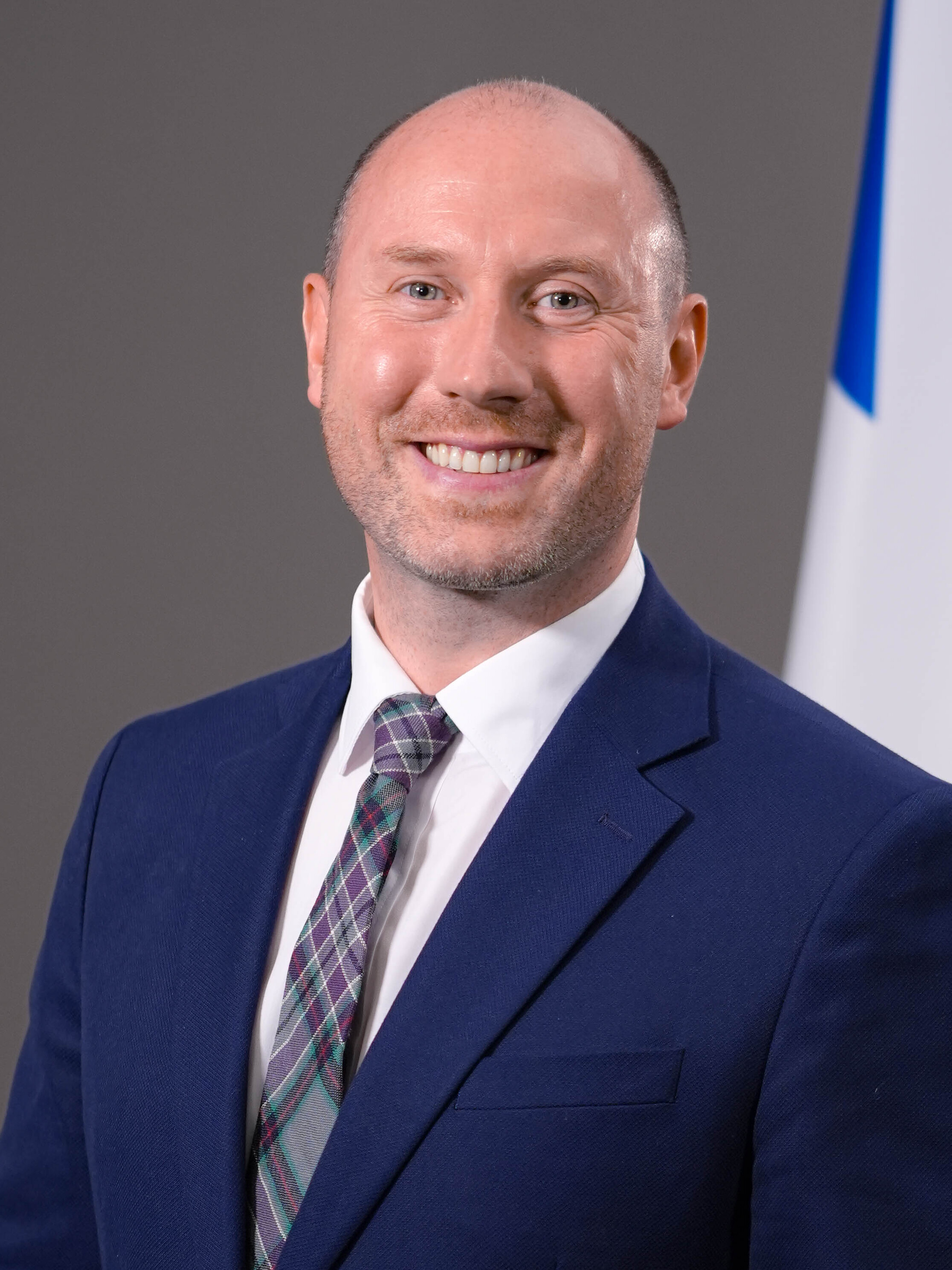
- Official portrait, 2026

Cabinet Secretary for Justice
- Incumbent
- Assumed office 20 May 2026
- First Minister: John Swinney
- Preceded by: Angela Constance

Cabinet Secretary for Health and Social Care (Note: As Cabinet Secretary for NHS Recovery, Health and Social Care from 8 February 2024 to 8 May 2024)
- In office 8 February 2024 – 20 May 2026
- First Minister: Humza Yousaf; John Swinney
- Preceded by: Michael Matheson
- Succeeded by: Angela Constance

Cabinet Secretary for Wellbeing Economy, Fair Work and Energy
- In office 29 March 2023 – 8 February 2024
- First Minister: Humza Yousaf
- Preceded by: Kate Forbes
- Succeeded by: Màiri McAllan

Minister for Culture, Europe and International Development
- In office 24 January 2022 – 29 March 2023
- First Minister: Nicola Sturgeon
- Preceded by: Jenny Gilruth
- Succeeded by: Christina McKelvie

Member of the Scottish Parliament for Airdrie Airdrie and Shotts (2021–2026)
- Incumbent
- Assumed office 6 May 2021
- Preceded by: Alex Neil
- Majority: 4,510 (17.7%)

SNP Spokesperson for Work and Pensions in the House of Commons
- In office 30 September 2015 – 1 February 2021
- Leader: Angus Robertson; Ian Blackford
- Preceded by: Hannah Bardell
- Succeeded by: David Linden

Member of Parliament for Airdrie and Shotts
- In office 7 May 2015 – 24 March 2021
- Preceded by: Pamela Nash
- Succeeded by: Anum Qaisar

Personal details
- Born: Neil Charles Gray; 16 March 1986 (age 40) Kirkwall, Orkney, Scotland
- Party: Scottish National Party
- Children: 4
- Education: University of Stirling

Neil Charles Gray (born 16 March 1986) is a Scottish politician who has served as Cabinet Secretary for Justice since 2026. A member of the Scottish National Party (SNP), he has been the Member of the Scottish Parliament (MSP) for Airdrie & Shotts since 2021.

He previously served as the Member of Parliament (MP) for the equivalent Westminster seat from 2015 to 2021. He served as Cabinet Secretary for Health and Social Care from 2024 to 2026, Cabinet Secretary for Wellbeing Economy, Fair Work and Energy from 2023 to 2024, and Minister for Culture, Europe and International Development from 2022 to 2023.

== Early life ==
Gray was born and brought up in Orkney, and was educated at Kirkwall Grammar School. He graduated from the University of Stirling in 2008 with a first-class Bachelor of Arts Honours degree in politics and journalism.

== Political career ==
=== Early years ===
Gray worked as a press and research intern for the SNP parliamentary group at the Scottish Parliament. Gray was also employed by Alex Neil from 2008, being appointed as constituency office manager in 2011.

The selection process for the Airdrie SNP candidacy, which Neil Gray ultimately won, was not without controversy. Former diplomat Craig Murray was nominated as a potential candidate at an Airdrie Branch meeting but did not make the final list as he failed SNP candidate vetting, whereupon he commented that "I think in both Airdrie & Shotts and in Falkirk it's evident who the party hierarchy wants to be the candidate." Former Policeman and SNP Councillor Alan Beveridge resigned from the party in February 2015 after Neil Gray was selected, claiming that there was a "climate of fear, intimidation and false allegations within the party" which were highlighted in the selection process.

=== Westminster; 2015–2021 ===
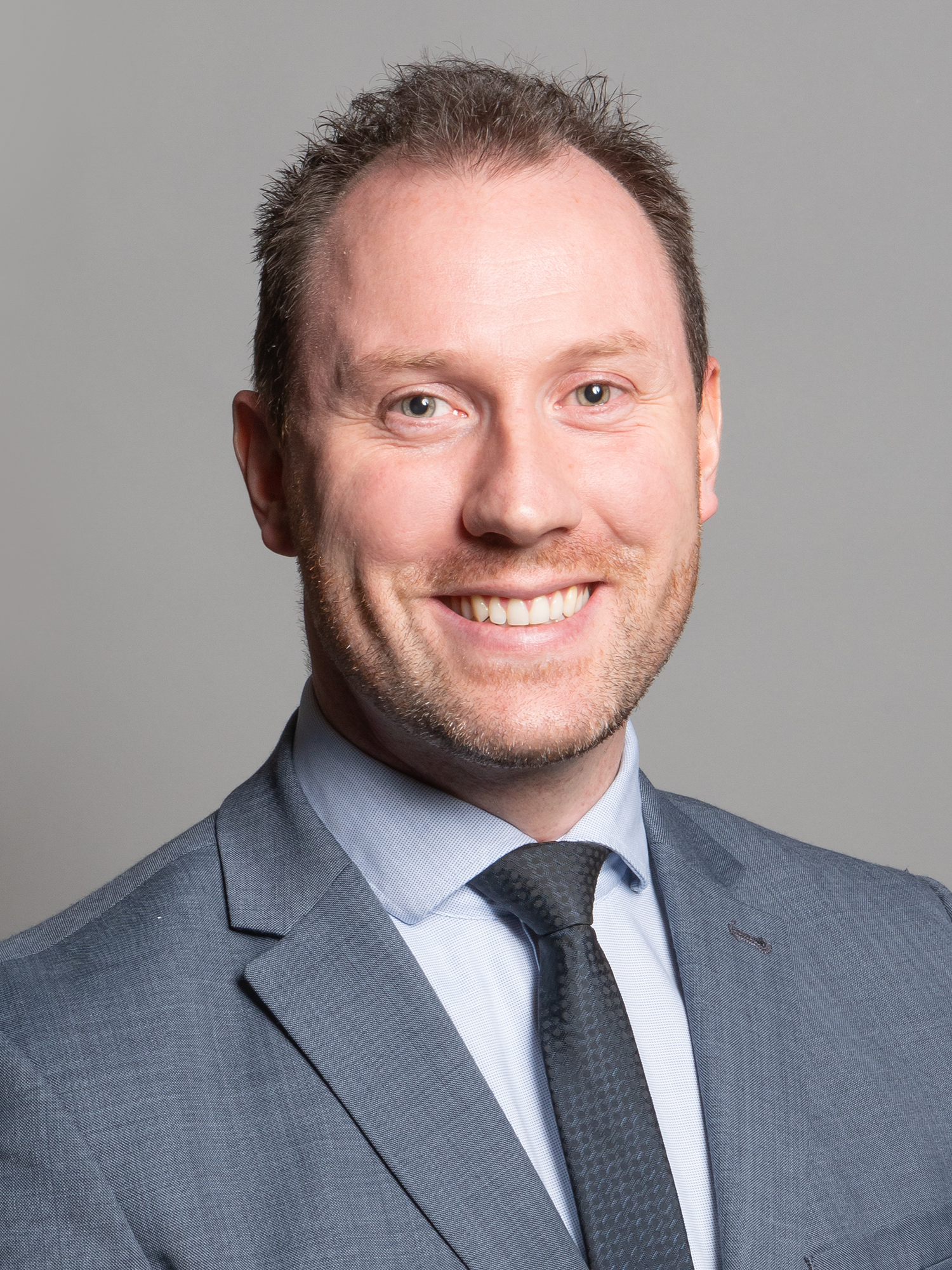
Gray's Westminster portrait, 2020

In September 2016, Gray, as a member of the new Joint Committee on the Palace of Westminster, called for the committee to consider permanently leaving the Palace of Westminster. He proposed that the committee should fully consider a new permanent building for Parliament; the committee voted 11–1 against this proposal.

In 2017, he held Airdrie and Shotts with a significantly reduced majority of 195 votes, although he did increase that in the 2019 general election to a stronger majority of 5,000 votes over the second-placed Labour candidate.

Gray has campaigned extensively in support of current and former employees of Roadchef, who have waited over 20 years for the repayment of money wrongly appropriated by former executive Tim Ingram Hill. On 8 January 2020, he questioned the Prime Minister on the issue, receiving an assurance that the Chancellor would "discuss" the matter with him.

In November 2020, Gray announced that he would be resigning as an MP in order to try and win a seat in the Scottish Parliament at the 2021 Scottish Parliament election. On 23 March 2021, he made his final speech in the House of Commons, and was appointed Steward and Bailiff of the Manor of Northstead a day later. He is the only SNP member to have held that notional office. North Lanarkshire Council calculated that his decision to resign as an MP and trigger a by-election cost taxpayers £175,000.

=== Holyrood; 2021-present ===
On 7 May 2021, Gray was elected as the MSP for Airdrie and Shotts, finishing ahead of former Scottish Labour leader, Richard Leonard. Following his election, Gray said, as deputy convener of the SNP's Social Justice and Fairness Commission, that a couple with two children in an independent Scotland could be guaranteed a minimum income of £37,000 annually by the state. He admitted that he had not costed the proposal.

=== Ministerial career ===
In a ministerial reshuffle on 24 January 2022, Gray was appointed as Minister for Culture, Europe and International Development.

Gray served as Cabinet Secretary for Wellbeing Economy, Fair Work and Energy under Humza Yousaf from 29 March 2023 to 8 February 2024. He was appointed Cabinet Secretary for Health and Social Care on 8 February, succeeding Michael Matheson, who had resigned amid an expenses scandal, and was retained in that role by John Swinney.

In November 2024, Gray faced criticism after it was revealed that he had used an official ministerial car to be chauffeured to watch four Aberdeen F.C. football matches. Gray, an acknowledged fan of Aberdeen F.C., registered the events as official government visits. In a statement to the Scottish Parliament, Gray also admitted to using an official car to attend five Scotland matches, and that he had been accompanied by a family member or guest to six of the matches. Gray said all the engagements were "official ministerial business" and that summaries were available for all of the meetings, but apologised for not attending "a wider range of games", and for creating the impression that he was acting "more as a fan and less as a minister". The Scottish Conservatives accused Gray of having a "jolly to watch the football" at the expense of the taxpayer and called for the costs to be refunded in full, while the Scottish Greens criticised him for not using public transport. First Minister John Swinney told journalists that he would not refer Gray for investigation under the ministerial code, and that he considered the matter "closed".

In January 2025, a Freedom of Information request revealed that no note was produced of the Gray's meeting at the 2023 League Cup final at Hampden Park. Gray subsequently apologised to the Scottish Parliament for making a misleading statement. John Swinney re-iterated his support for Gray and insisted that the Health Secretary had made an "inadvertent error".

In June 2025, it was revealed that in 2024 Gray had also used his official ministerial car to be chauffeured to a pub before an Aberdeen F.C. match. The journeys were logged in the official ministerial register as trips to and from a "personal address, Aberdeen". These entries were amended after an investigation by the Scottish Daily Mail showed that no evidence of such an address could be found. Officials acknowledged that Gray had no home address in Aberdeen; the Scottish Government insisted there had been an "administration error", and the First Minister John Swinney said, "The ministerial car was used in accordance with the rules that have been set out within the guidance on this occasion. And those rules that are clearly and publicly advertised have been followed on this occasion."

Gray was appointed Cabinet Secretary for Justice on 20 May 2026.

== Personal life ==
Outside politics Gray was formerly a keen athlete, representing Scotland in the 400 m, until a serious knee injury ended his career in athletics.

Neil has three daughters and one son with his wife, Karlie.

== See also ==
- Proposed relocation of the Parliament of the United Kingdom

Parliament of the United Kingdom
Preceded by Pamela Nash	Member of Parliament for Airdrie and Shotts; 2015–2021	Succeeded by Anum Qaisar-Javed
Scottish Parliament
Preceded by Karen Whitefield	MSP for Airdrie and Shotts; 2021–present	Incumbent
Political offices
Preceded by Michael Matheson	Cabinet Secretary for Health and Social Care; 2024-present	Succeeded by Incumbent
