= Peterhead Docks railway station =

Former railway station in Aberdeenshire, Scotland

Coordinates: 57.50961°N 1.77454°W

Peterhead Docks railway station was a goods railway station in the Roanheads neighbourhood of Peterhead, Aberdeenshire, Scotland. It opened in 1865 (160 years ago) and closed in 1946 (79 years ago).

Former Services

Preceding station	Disused railways	Following station
Peterhead	Great North of Scotland Railway	Terminus
