= Roanheads =

Residential area in Aberdeenshire, Scotland

Coordinates: 57.50931°N 1.774957°W

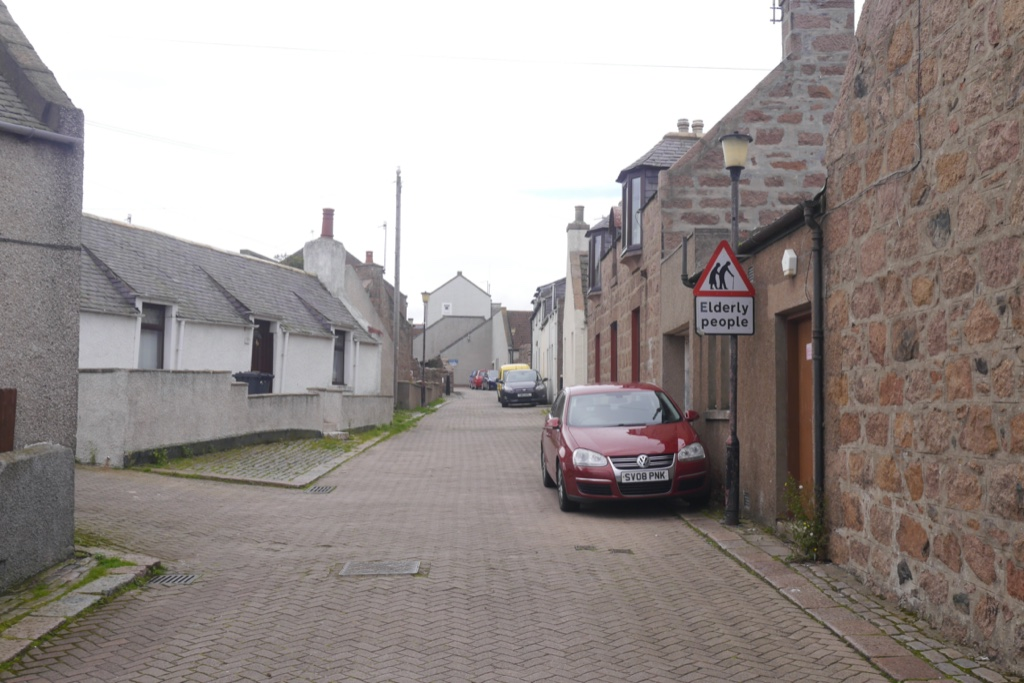
- Looking east along one of the streets named Roanheads from Seagate

- Location within Scotland
- OS grid reference: NK 1346
- Country: Scotland
- Sovereign state: United Kingdom
- Post town: PETERHEAD
- Postcode district: AB42
- Dialling code: 01779
- Police: Scotland
- Fire: Scottish
- Ambulance: Scottish

Roanheads is a residential area of coastal Aberdeenshire, Scotland, located between Peterhead and Buchanhaven. Laid out by 1771, now the oldest part of the town, it was established after Peterhead's fishermen settled there due to its position on the northeastern shoulder of the town's peninsula, 0.75 miles (1.21 km) north of today's town centre. Two streets in the area are also named Roanheads, although they were likely joined prior to modern construction on Seagate.

It is mentioned in the town's original feu contract as being Peterhead's "commonty and pasturage".

Historian Charles McKean believes some of the few surviving pantiled houses may be original. Almost all of the homes on New Street, Almanthyle Road, Gladstone Road, Port Henry Road and Great Stuart Road are listed. They make up a large section of Aberdeenshire Council's Peterhead Roanheads Conservation Area, one of around forty conservation areas in Aberdeenshire.

Roanheads takes its name from a pair of headlands a short distance to the northeast, overlooked by Gadle Braes.

In February 1880, the schooner Lady Kilmarnock ran ashore at Roanheads during a voyage from Sunderland to Peterhead. She was refloated, but consequently sank. Her crew survived.

Peterhead Docks railway station stood in Roanheads between 1865 and 1946.

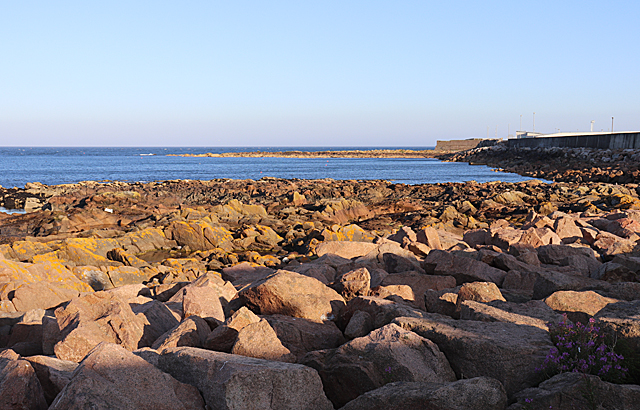
Part of the headlands below Gadle Braes
