= Anum Qaisar =

Scottish SNP politician

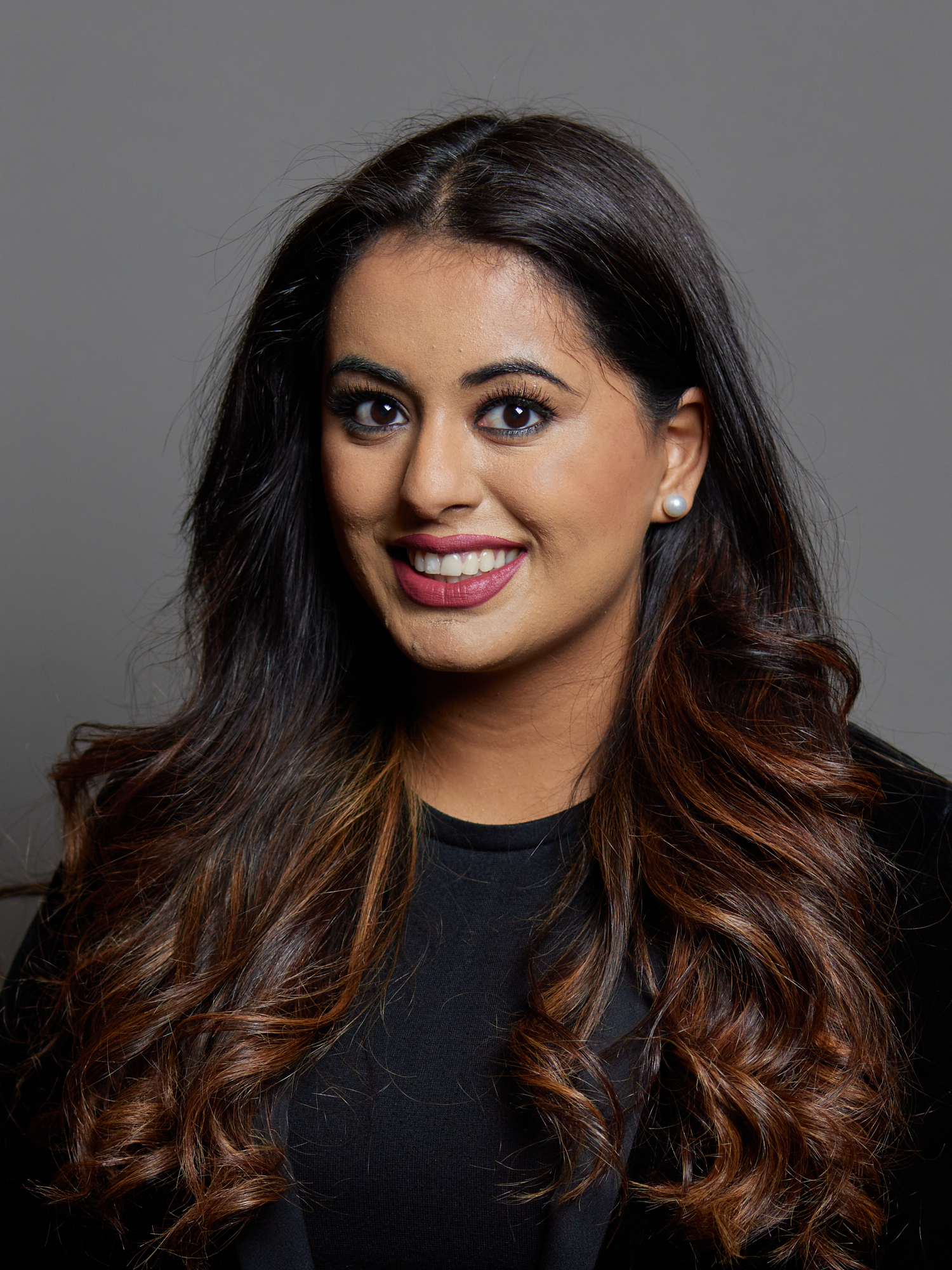
- Official portrait, 2021

SNP Spokesperson for Levelling Up in the House of Commons
- In office 4 September 2023 – 5 July 2024
- Leader: Stephen Flynn
- Preceded by: Chris Stephens

Member of Parliament for Airdrie and Shotts
- In office 13 May 2021 – 30 May 2024
- Preceded by: Neil Gray
- Succeeded by: Kenneth Stevenson

Personal details
- Born: 11 September 1992 (age 34) Motherwell, Scotland
- Party: Scottish National Party
- Other political affiliations: Labour (until 2014)
- Education: University of Stirling (BA)

Anum Qaisar, previously Anum Qaisar-Javed (born 11 September 1992) is a Scottish National Party (SNP) politician who served as the Member of Parliament (MP) for Airdrie and Shotts from 2021 to 2024, when she lost the seat to Kenneth Stevenson of the Labour Party. She was also the SNP Spokesperson for Levelling Up from 2023 to 2024.

== Early life and career ==
Qaisar was born and raised in Motherwell to a Scottish Pakistani family, where her parents were shopkeepers. Her grandfather had emigrated from Pakistan to Manchester in the 1950s.

She described her first experience of racism aged nine, when she was waiting at a bus stop after school on the day after the 11 September attacks in New York, her ninth birthday, and was asked, "Why is your skin colour the same colour as mud, as poo? Is your dad a terrorist?"

She studied politics at the University of Stirling. and worked as a Modern Studies teacher at Boroughmuir High School and George Watson's College in Edinburgh, the latter where pupils' parents pay fees of up to £13,551 a year. She taught her students about why people from minority backgrounds are under-represented in politics; citing a lack of role models.

== Political career ==
=== Early activism and pre-parliamentary career ===
Brought up in a Labour-supporting family, Qaisar was once an active member of Scottish Labour and became general secretary of Muslim Friends of Labour. However, she campaigned for a "Yes" vote at the 2014 Scottish independence referendum, and after the result produced a victory for the "Better Together" campaign, she left Labour and joined the SNP.

Qaisar later worked a parliamentary researcher for Carol Monaghan MP, and as a case-worker for then-Scottish Justice Secretary Humza Yousaf.

In 2015, Qaisar unsuccessfully stood to be selected as the SNP candidate for Edinburgh Eastern at the 2016 Scottish Parliament election, finishing second to Ash Denham.

In April 2021, Qaisar was selected as the SNP candidate for the 2021 Airdrie and Shotts by-election. The election was triggered by the resignation of the sitting SNP MP Neil Gray to stand at the May 2021 Scottish Parliament election.

=== Parliamentary career ===
On 14 May 2021, Qaisar won the election, becoming Scotland's second female Muslim MP after Tasmina Ahmed-Sheikh, also of the SNP, and just like Qaisar a former member of the Labour Party. Turnout was an unusually low 34.3%, and while Qaisar increased the SNP's share of the vote, her majority of 1,757 votes (8.0%) was lower than Neil Gray had won at the 2019 UK general election. After her victory, Qaisar pledged to be a role model for other minorities and to "fight for independence".

Qaisar took her seat in the House of Commons on 17 May 2021.

She made her maiden speech in the Commons on 19 May. She complained that the House of Commons was more 'rowdy' than her former school pupils, and reported being told by staff that the best way to navigate the building was to 'get lost'. She ended on a serious note that in the current COVID-19 crisis the NHS had relied on migrant staff, criticising the UK's point-based immigration policy, which she said would even have excluded her own father (if it had been in place at the time) and deprived the country of an MP, a doctor and a medical student (herself and her siblings). In a question session with Dominic Cummings on 26 May 2021, she asked if her former Modern Studies students were more aware of COVID-19 border control benefits than the Government.

Following racist abuse of Black English footballers, after the UEFA Euro 2020 Final, during Business Questions to the Leader of the House, Qaisar shared some of the racist abuse she had endured on social media in asking for an urgent debate on 'real action' to end racism in this country, so that "MPs of colour" can speak. Jacob Rees-Mogg, then-Leader of the House of Commons, said 'the House' sympathised but did not confirm a debate, directing his criticism at the social media. In November 2021, she questioned the value of the House of Lords, describing it as 'an unelected crony-stuffed second chamber'. In December 2021, she was given a frontbench role in trade.

Qaisar was one of many SNP MPs who lost their seat to Labour at the 2024 general election.

=== 2026 Scottish elections ===
Qaisar sought selection to the Scottish Parliament in the 2026 Holyrood election, but did not get selected.

== See also ==
- List of British Pakistanis
- List of ethnic minority politicians in the United Kingdom
- Scottish Asian

Parliament of the United Kingdom
Preceded by Neil Gray	Member of Parliament for Airdrie and Shotts; 2021–2024	Succeeded by Kenneth Stevenson
