= Airdrie and Shotts (UK Parliament constituency) =

UK Parliament constituency (since 1997)

Coordinates: 55.845°N 3.892°W

- County constituency for the House of Commons
- Interactive map of current boundaries
- Boundary of Airdrie and Shotts in Scotland
- Subdivision: North Lanarkshire
- Electorate: 70,420 (March 2020)
- Major settlements: Airdrie, Caldercruix, Shotts

Current constituency
- Created: 1997
- Member of Parliament: Kenneth Stevenson (Labour)
- Created from: Monklands East

Overlaps
- Scottish Parliament: Central Scotland

Airdrie and Shotts is a constituency of the UK House of Commons, located in central Scotland within the North Lanarkshire council area. It elects one Member of Parliament (MP) at least once every five years using the first-past-the-post system of voting.

There is also an Airdrie and Shotts constituency of the Scottish Parliament.

== Boundaries ==
1997–2005: The Monklands District electoral divisions of Airdrie North and Airdrie South, and the Motherwell District electoral division of Fortissat.

2005–2024: The North Lanarkshire Council wards of Academy, Airdrie Central, Airdrie North, Airdrie South, Benhar, Calderbank, Chapelhall, Clarkston, Craigneuk and Petersburn, Dykehead, Holytown, New Monkland West, Newarthill, Newmains, North Cairnhill and Coatdyke, Plains and Caldercruix, Salsburgh, South East Cairnhill and Gartlea, Stane, and Whinhall.

The 2005 changes saw the seat lose some territory to Motherwell and Wishaw whilst gaining part of Hamilton North and Bellshill.

In 2007 the North Lanarkshire wards were converted into multi-member wards, with the following falling within the constituency: Airdrie Central, Airdrie North, Airdrie South, Fortissat, Mossend and Holytown (part), Motherwell North (part), Murdostoun (part).

2024–present: Following the 2023 Periodic Review of Westminster constituencies which came into effect for the 2024 general election, the constituency boundaries were redrawn with minor changes and the seat now consists of the following:

- In full: the North Lanarkshire Council wards of Airdrie North, Airdrie South, Fortissat;
- In part: the North Lanarkshire Council wards of Airdrie Central (nearly all), Mossend and Holytown (eastern parts including Holytown), Motherwell North (northern parts including Newarthill), Murdostoun (northern and eastern parts including Cleland and Newmains).

== History ==
The constituency has existed since 1997; however, it underwent significant boundary changes in 2005. Before 2015, it could have been described as a safe seat for the Labour Party, who held it with a majority of over 12,000 votes until Neil Gray of the Scottish National Party (SNP) was elected at that year's general election, winning the seat from Pamela Nash by 8,779 votes. Gray's majority dipped to just 195 in the 2017 election. However, in the 2019 election he won by 5,201 votes. Gray resigned on 24 March 2021 to contest the 2021 Scottish Parliament election seat of the same name, triggering a by-election, which was won by Anum Qaisar. The seat was re-gained by Labour at the 2024 general election and is currently represented by Kenneth Stevenson.

Former MPs for the constituency include: Pamela Nash, former Baby of the House, John Reid, former Labour Home Secretary and Defence Secretary, and Helen Liddell, former Labour Scottish Secretary.

== Constituency profile ==
It is a generally working-class, urban seat, and contains the towns of Airdrie, Calderbank, Chapelhall, Glenmavis and Shotts.

The majority of this constituency maintains the boundaries of its predecessor. From the former North Lanarkshire constituency came Holytown and Newarthill. This seat is positioned on either side of the M8 motorway to Glasgow. Small semi-urban towns such as Shotts (including Stane and Dykehead) were added to Airdrie in the 1997 redistribution to form this seat, the predecessor of which was Monklands East. An area in the eastern part of Coatbridge is also part of the constituency.

Electoral Calculus describes the seat as "Traditional", characterised by working class people with lower levels of income and formal education.

== Members of Parliament ==
Election	Member	Party
1997	Helen Liddell	Labour
2005	John Reid	Labour
2010	Pamela Nash	Labour
2015	Neil Gray	SNP
2021 by-election	Anum Qaisar	SNP
2024	Kenneth Stevenson	Labour

== Election results ==
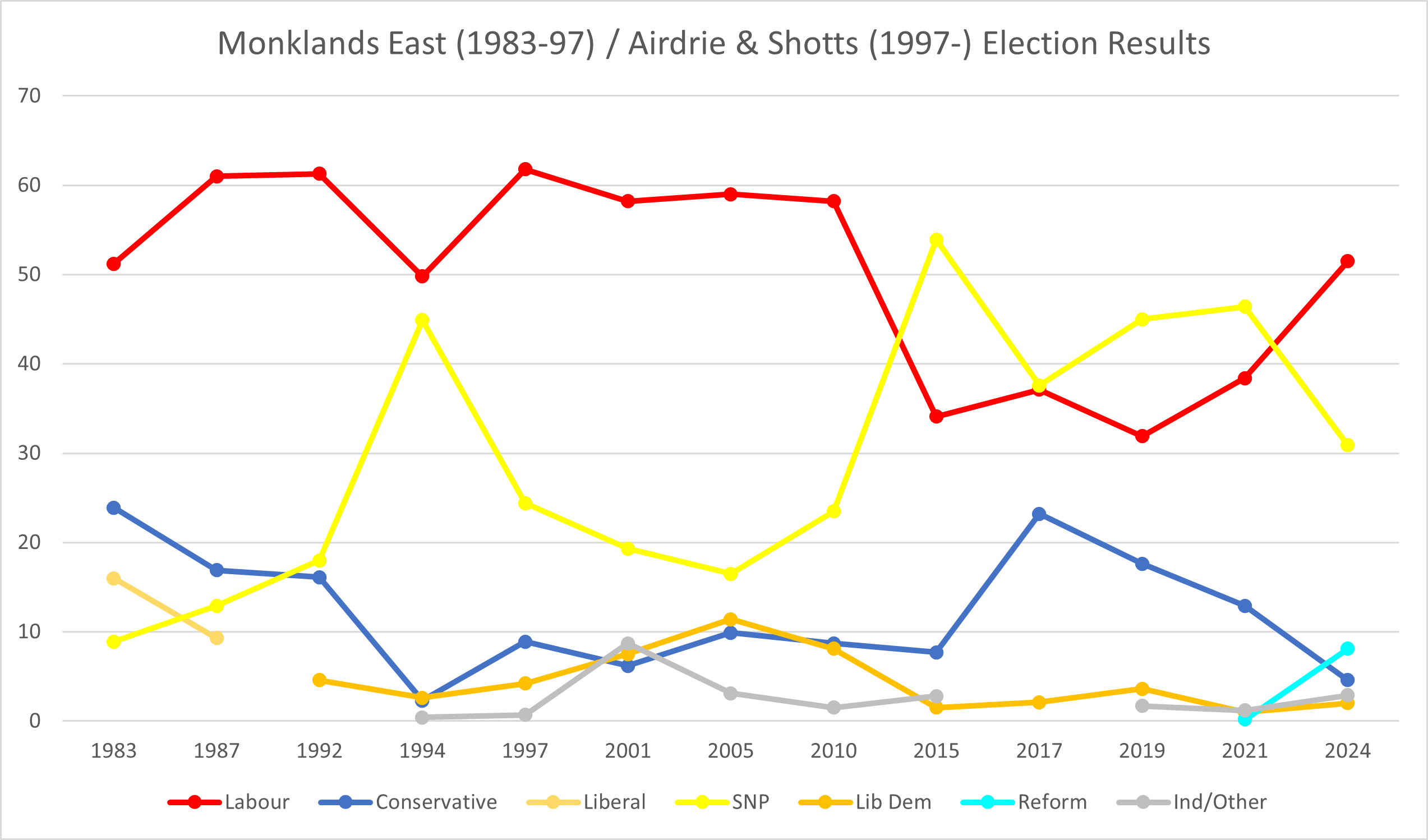
Monklands East (1983−1997) / Airdrie & Shotts (1997−) Election Results

=== Elections in the 2020s ===
General election 2024: Airdrie and Shotts
Party	Candidate	Votes	%	±%
Labour	Kenneth Stevenson	18,871	51.5	+18.4
SNP	Anum Qaisar	11,324	30.9	−13.7
Reform	David Hall	2,971	8.1	N/A
Conservative	Alexandra Herdman	1,696	4.6	−12.7
Liberal Democrats	Lewis Younie	725	2.0	−1.6
Alba	Josh Robertson	623	1.7	N/A
BUP	John Jo Leckie	456	1.2	N/A
Majority		7,547	20.6	N/A
Turnout		36,666	52.2	
Labour gain from SNP		Swing	+16.2	

2024 compared with the notion results of the 2019 general election rather than the 2021 by-election.

2021 Airdrie and Shotts by-election
Party	Candidate	Votes	%	±%
SNP	Anum Qaisar-Javed	10,129	46.4	+1.4
Labour	Kenneth Stevenson	8,372	38.4	+6.5
Conservative	Ben Callaghan	2,812	12.9	−4.7
Liberal Democrats	Stephen Arrundale	220	1.0	−2.6
SDP	Neil Manson	151	0.7	N/A
Scottish Unionist	Jonathan Stanley	59	0.3	N/A
Reform	Martyn Greene	45	0.2	N/A
UKIP	Donald Mackay	39	0.2	N/A
Majority		1,757	8.0	−5.1
Turnout		21,827	34.3	−28.0
Registered electors		63,705		
SNP hold		Swing	−2.5	

=== Elections in the 2010s ===
2019 notional result (Note: Estimate of the 2019 general election result as if the revised boundaries recommended under the 2023 boundary review were in place)
Party	Vote	%
SNP	20,667	44.6
Labour	15,343	33.1
Conservative	8,000	17.3
Liberal Democrats	1,652	3.6
Scottish Greens	676	1.5
Majority	5,324	11.5
Turnout	46,338	65.8
Electorate	70,420	

General election 2019: Airdrie and Shotts
Party	Candidate	Votes	%	±%
SNP	Neil Gray	17,929	45.0	+7.4
Labour	Helen McFarlane	12,728	31.9	−5.2
Conservative	Lorraine Nolan	7,011	17.6	−5.6
Liberal Democrats	William Crossman	1,419	3.6	+1.5
Green	Rosemary McGowan	685	1.7	N/A
Majority		5,201	13.1	+12.6
Turnout		39,772	62.3	+3.1
Registered electors		64,011		
SNP hold		Swing	+6.3	

General election 2017: Airdrie and Shotts
Party	Candidate	Votes	%	±%
SNP	Neil Gray	14,291	37.6	−16.3
Labour	Helen McFarlane	14,096	37.1	+3.0
Conservative	Jennifer Donnellan	8,813	23.2	+15.5
Liberal Democrats	Ewan McRobert	802	2.1	+0.6
Majority		195	0.5	−19.3
Turnout		38,002	59.2	−6.9
Registered electors		64,146		
SNP hold		Swing	−9.7	

General election 2015: Airdrie and Shotts
Party	Candidate	Votes	%	±%
SNP	Neil Gray	23,887	53.9	+30.4
Labour	Pamela Nash	15,108	34.1	−24.1
Conservative	Eric Holford	3,389	7.7	−1.0
UKIP	Matthew Williams	1,088	2.5	N/A
Liberal Democrats	John Love	678	1.5	−6.6
Independent	Deryck Beaumont	136	0.3	N/A
Majority		8,779	19.8	N/A
Turnout		44,286	66.3	+8.8
Registered electors		66,792		
SNP gain from Labour		Swing	+27.2	

General election 2010: Airdrie and Shotts
Party	Candidate	Votes	%	±%
Labour	Pamela Nash	20,849	58.2	−0.8
SNP	Sophia Coyle	8,441	23.5	+7.0
Conservative	Ruth Whitfield	3,133	8.7	−1.2
Liberal Democrats	John Love	2,898	8.1	−3.3
Independent	John McGeechan	528	1.5	N/A
Majority		12,408	34.7	−7.8
Turnout		35,849	57.5	+4.0
Registered electors		62,364		
Labour hold		Swing	−3.9	

=== Elections in the 2000s ===
General election 2005: Airdrie and Shotts
Party	Candidate	Votes	%	±%
Labour	John Reid	19,568	59.0	
SNP	Malcolm Balfour	5,484	16.5	
Liberal Democrats	Helen Watt	3,792	11.4	
Conservative	Stuart Cottis	3,271	9.9	
Scottish Socialist	Fraser Coats	706	2.1	
Scottish Independence Party	Joseph Rowan	337	1.0	
Majority		14,084	42.5	
Turnout		33,158	53.5	
Labour hold		Swing		

General election 2001: Airdrie and Shotts
Party	Candidate	Votes	%	±%
Labour	Helen Liddell	18,478	58.2	−3.6
SNP	Alison Lindsay	6,138	19.3	−5.1
Liberal Democrats	John Love	2,376	7.5	+3.3
Conservative	Gordon McIntosh	1,960	6.2	−2.7
Scottish Unionist	Mark Dempsey	1,439	4.5	N/A
Scottish Socialist	Kenny McGuigan	1,171	3.7	N/A
Socialist Labour	Chris Herriot	174	0.5	N/A
Majority		12,340	38.9	+1.5
Turnout		31,736	54.4	−17.0
Registered electors		58,349		
Labour hold		Swing	+0.7	

=== Elections in the 1990s ===
General election 1997: Airdrie and Shotts
Party	Candidate	Votes	%	±%
Labour	Helen Liddell	25,460	61.8	
SNP	Keith Robertson	10,048	24.4	
Conservative	Nicholas Brook	3,660	8.9	
Liberal Democrats	Richard Wolseley	1,719	4.2	
Referendum	Crawford Semple	294	0.7	
Majority		15,412	37.4	
Turnout		41,181	71.4	
Labour win (new seat)				

== See also ==
- Scottish Westminster Constituencies
