= Scottish Fair Trade Forum =

Scottish fair trade charity

Scottish Fair Trade Forum
- Abbreviation: SFTF
- Formation: 2007
- Legal status: Charity
- Headquarters: Glasgow
- Region served: Scotland

The Scottish Fair Trade Forum is a Scottish charitable body that describes its mission as '...to gain Fair Trade Nation status for Scotland.' The Forum continues to promote the inclusion and use of Fair Trade products through involvement in helping individual towns, schools, councils and public bodies throughout the country achieve Fairtrade Status.

== History ==
After the Labour and Liberal Democrat coalition government of the Scottish Parliament engaged in talks with the Welsh Assembly over each country's commitment to the Fair Trade Movement, the Scottish administration publicly committed to the Forum's creation on 27 January 2007. The Forum was officially launched by the Scottish Parliament on 27 October 2007. As Wales reached Fair Trade Nation status in 2008, the Fair Trade Forum aimed to make Scotland the second Fair Trade Nation in the world. This goal was achieved on 25 February 2013 and was celebrated at an event in Perth on 7 September 2013

== See also ==
- Fairtrade Town
- Fairtrade Foundation
