= Banff Academy =

Location
- Bellevue Road; Banff, Aberdeenshire, AB45 1BY; Scotland
- Coordinates: 57.6623°N 2.5339°W

Information
- Type: Secondary school
- Local authority: Aberdeenshire Council
- Head teacher: Alan Horberry
- Years offered: S1–S6
- Gender: Mixed
- Enrolment: 804 (2018)
- Website: www.banffacademy.aberdeenshire.sch.uk

Banff Academy is a S1–S6 secondary school in Banff, Aberdeenshire, Scotland. It serves the towns of Banff, Macduff, Whitehills, Portsoy, Aberchirder, Gardenstown, Ordiquhill, Fordyce and surrounding communities.

All Aberdeenshire schools are co-educational, providing education for both boys and girls.

In November 2013, an inspection by Education Scotland branded the school as "weak". However, the school received commendation from Education Scotland the following month, stating that they had made "positive progress" since the school adopted an 80-point improvement plan.
