= Chapelhall =

Village in North Lanarkshire, Scotland

Coordinates: 55.8450°N 3.9472°W

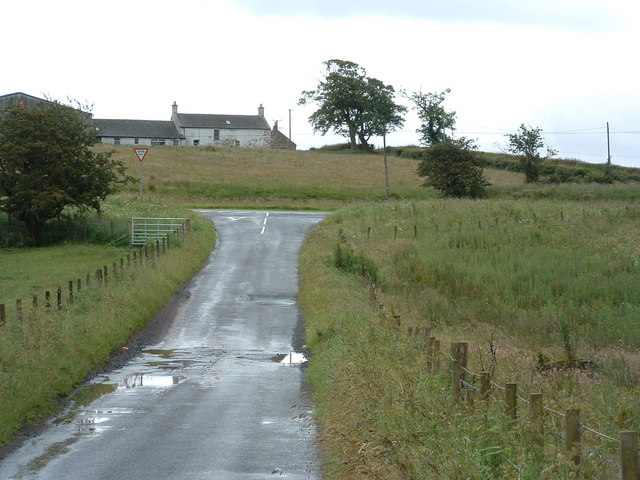
- Junction at North Linrigg, Chapelhall

- Location within North Lanarkshire
- Population: 7,140 (2020)
  - Edinburgh: 35 mi (56 km) ENE
  - London: 344 mi (554 km) SSE
- Council area: North Lanarkshire
- Lieutenancy area: Lanarkshire
- Country: Scotland
- Sovereign state: United Kingdom
- Post town: AIRDRIE
- Postcode district: ML6
- Dialling code: 01698, 01236
- Police: Scotland
- Fire: Scottish
- Ambulance: Scottish
- UK Parliament: Airdrie and Shotts
- Scottish Parliament: Airdrie and Shotts

Chapelhall (from the words chapel and hall) is a place with a church (or chapel) hall, near the town of Airdrie in North Lanarkshire, Scotland. With house building, the distinction between Airdrie and Chapelhall is being eroded. Established as a small mining village in the 19th century, it now has a population of over 7,100. Chapelhall is situated just off the M8 motorway 13 miles (21 kilometres) east of Glasgow city centre and around 33 miles (53 kilometres) west of Edinburgh. Chapelhall is also near to many of Lanarkshire's main towns, such as Bellshill (4 mi or 6 km), Coatbridge (5 mi or 8 km), Motherwell (5 mi or 8 km), Hamilton (7 mi or 11 km) and Cumbernauld (8 mi or 13 km), as well as being around three miles (five kilometres) from Airdrie town centre. The Eurocentral freight village/industrial estate is just a mile or so away and employs people from around Lanarkshire, Glasgow and West Lothian. The rail-freight village links with Grangemouth docks 28 miles (45 km) away, (England to the south and beyond to mainland Europe).

Chapelhall lies on the opposite side of the North Calder Water from Calderbank. Iron working and coal mining were once prominent - with three blast furnaces working in the early 1830s. The old village also had a quarry, a brickworks and a bakery. The first curator of Kew Gardens, William Aiton, began work as a gardener in Woodhall House near Chapelhall. Three Celtic FC footballers came from the village, Thomas Curley, Lisbon Lions player John Clark, and Peter Grant.

== Education ==
In December 2001, North Lanarkshire Council published its Schools and Centres 21 (SC21) Programme, a Public Private Partnership under the broader Education 2010 plan to develop new school facilities throughout the North Lanarkshire area.

In Chapelhall, the plan proposed a new joint campus for Chapelhall Primary non-denominational and St Aloysius Roman Catholic Primary Schools, which would replace the previous two separate school buildings at Gibb Street (Chapelhall) and on the Main Street (St Aloysius Primary). The initial proposal was based on the prototype Cumbernauld Primary/St Andrew's Primary site, which was endorsed by the Archdiocese of Glasgow, consisting of one public entrance, a shared office, library, gymnasium and dining hall and two adjacent staffrooms with a moveable partition that could be kept open (as both staffs preferred to do).

In October 2004, however, the Diocese of Motherwell objected to the joint campus proposal, calling for separate entrances, staffrooms, staff toilets, libraries, gymnasia and nurseries, with a shared dining hall. They lodged a petition with the Scottish Government under Section 22D of the Education (Scotland) Act 1980 - a subsequent review by ministers concluded that North Lanarkshire Council had acted in good faith and that the joint campus proposals did not breach the legislation.

In December 2004 a series of concessions including greater segregation of staff and pupils allowed the building work to proceed. The contract was awarded to Balfour Beatty Capital, trading as Transform Schools (North Lanarkshire) Funding Plc.

One concession was a moratorium on any further shared campus arrangements until the Chapelhall joint campus scheme had been evaluated. This moratorium was lifted in 2009 following the publication of a final evaluation report on shared campus schools in North Lanarkshire, produced by Dan Sweeney, a former senior official in the council's education department. The report largely endorsed the shared campus model and found that, in particular, "the autonomy of the individual schools, including ethos and educational principles, has been maintained, and the implementation of the Catholic Education Commission Charter has not been affected".

The Chapelhall campus was opened on 18 August 2006.

The design capacity of Chapelhall Primary is 250 and St Aloysius Primary is 320. Both schools previously provided nursery classes which have been combined to provide Early Education classes. The physical education facilities within the new building, including an on-site 7-a-side floodlit synthetic pitch, are available for community use. In addition the assembly hall/gym, dining/general purpose room and other community areas are accessible to the community.

== Religion ==
There are three established Christian churches in Chapelhall. They are as follows:

- St Aloysius Roman Catholic Church, Main Street,
- Chapelhall Church of Scotland, (Presbyterian) Russell Street
- Chapelhall Gospel Hall, (Brethren) Roberton Street

== Sport ==
Football

Senior/Professional Football

The following members of the Scottish Professional Football League are within a short drive of Chapelhall:

- Airdrieonians
- Albion Rovers
- Clyde
- Hamilton Academical
- Motherwell

Junior Football

The following junior clubs are within a short drive from Chapelhall

- Bellshill Athletic
- Carluke Rovers
- Cumbernauld United
- Gartcairn FC
- Shotts Bon Accord
- Wishaw Juniors
