= A721 road =

Road in Scotland

Coordinates: 55.77224°N 3.91726°W

A721

Route information
- Length: 34 mi (55 km)

Major junctions
- Northwest end: Daldowie
- Southeast end: Kirkdean

Location
- Country: United Kingdom
- Constituent country: Scotland

Road network
- Roads in the United Kingdom; Motorways; A and B road zones
← A720	→ A722

The A721 road in Scotland runs mainly through North Lanarkshire and South Lanarkshire, serving as a main route within Bellshill, Motherwell, Wishaw and Carluke. It falls within the boundaries of Glasgow and the Scottish Borders for short distances at either end.

== Route ==
=== Bellshill and district ===
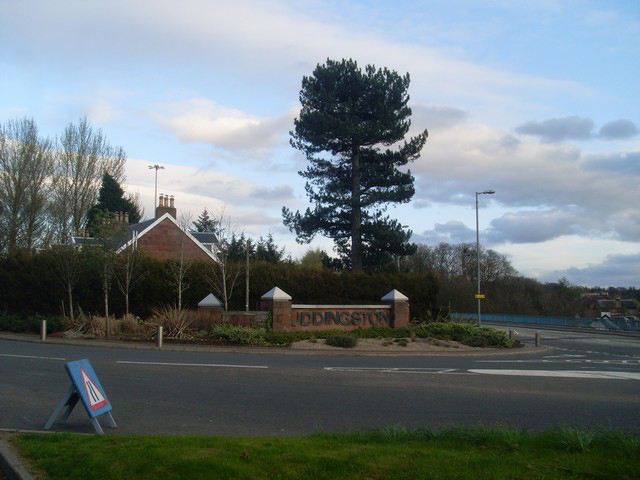
Sign for Uddingston, where the A721 turns east (left in image)

At its westernmost point, the A721 starts at the entrance to Daldowie Crematorium on the south-eastern edge of Glasgow, where its designation is used initially for the overbridge access for Junction 3A of the M74 motorway (between Glasgow and Carlisle), and which also connects to the south end of the M73 motorway towards Cumbernauld. Immediately north of the motorway is the Black Bear Roundabout at Broomhouse which is the eastern termination of the A74 road within Glasgow. The A721 follows the same route eastwards as a dual carriageway over the North Calder Water – the boundary entering North Lanarkshire – and under the M73 Maryville Interchange. There is a separate onslip for the M74 southbound (which the main Junction 3A does not provide, the usual spot on the overbridge being taken by the M73 northbound slip) prior to the 'three tins' roundabout, where the northbound option is the B7001 (Old Edinburgh Road) to Birkenshaw (some older maps still show this section as the A74). There is soon a southbound junction for the B758 towards Blantyre, followed by the Powburn Toll, previously the point where major routes towards Edinburgh and Lanarkshire diverged. Its site is nowadays marked by a large welcome sign for Uddingston, although the town itself lies on the other side of the motorway. The main carriageway heads over the M74 into Uddingston and South Lanarkshire as the B7071, but the A721 heads east as New Edinburgh Road, skirting the southern parts of Tannochside and Viewpark, and featuring a junction for the B756 heading south back towards Uddingston or to Bothwell.

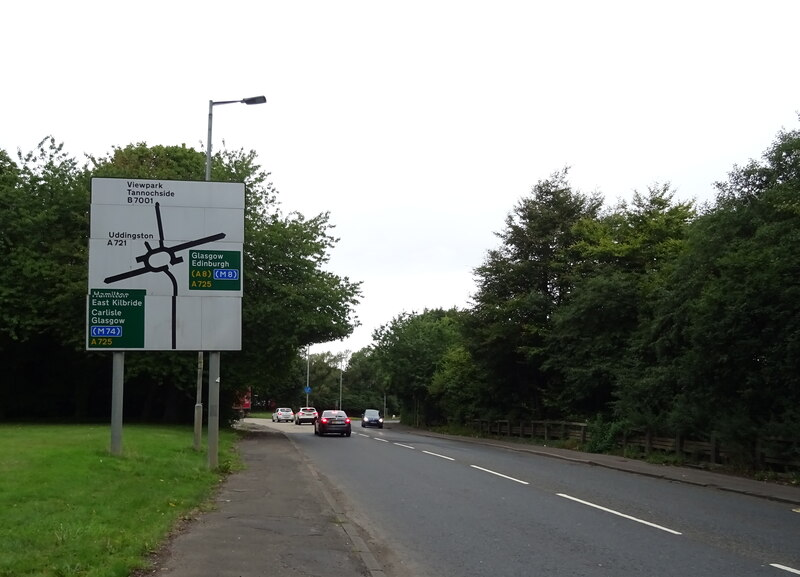
Looking west on the A721 from Bellshill with signage for the A725 Bellziehill junction

The next major feature on the route is the Bellziehill junction on the A725 Bellshill Bypass, a major trunk route which also leads local traffic to the M8 motorway further north and the M74 further south, and to East Kilbride. The B7001 also converges here, providing access to the Righead Industrial Estate. On the east side of the junction, the A721 continues into Bellshill as Gartcosh Walk, a mini-bybass for western parts of the town which includes two pedestrian underpasses and provides the only vehicular access for Cardinal Newman High School, ending at an oval roundabout (reconfigured from a smaller circular version for the construction of the adjacent Tesco superstore in 2009). The A721 turns south here as North Road, other routes being the B7070 (also North Road) towards Coatbridge and the A775 to Mossend and Holytown.

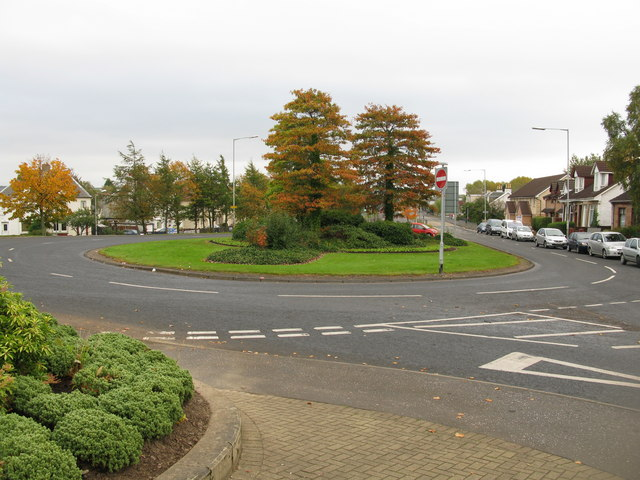
Elongated roundabout to south-east of central Bellshill

Within central Bellshill, there is a dual designation due to the partial one-way system in force: southbound traffic continues straight on Hamilton Road then turns southeast on Crossgates (the B7070 heads southwest to Orbiston) until meeting an elongated roundabout, while northbound traffic from this roundabout can either take the same route or use the one-way Motherwell Road and Main Street to re-join North Road at the partially-pedestrianised Bellshill Cross, where there has been a statue of local footballer Billy McNeill since 2022. Both routes cross under bridges carrying the Shotts Line either side of Bellshill railway station, both with fairly low 4.3 metres (14 ft) clearances. After the two roads meet at the roundabout, a dual carriageway leads traffic out of Bellshill and over the valley of the South Calder Water on the Holm Forge Bridge, a 1930s replacement for the older crossing of the same name which still exists as a footbridge downstream and is part of the local Greenlink Cycle Path network.

=== Motherwell and Wishaw ===
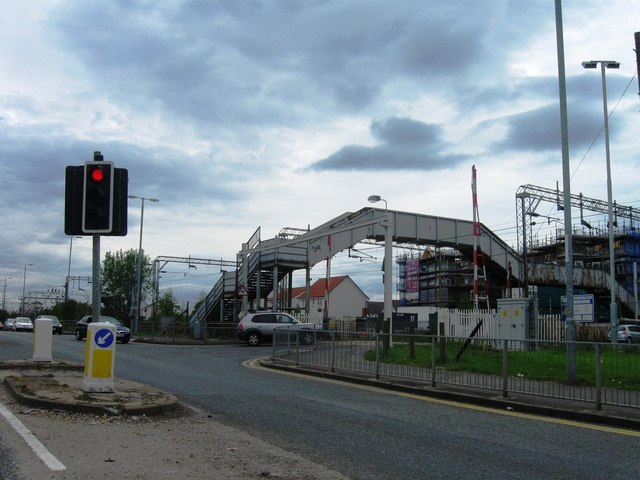
The A721 meets the West Coast Main Line at North Motherwell, with a level crossing and pedestrian footbridge required for connection to the neighbourhood on the other side of the tracks

From the Holm Forge Bridge, the A721 proceeds south and uphill as Bellshill Road into Motherwell, passing the Forgewood and North Motherwell neighbourhoods before entering another one-way system for the town centre and Motherwell Shopping Centre (Brandon Parade): southbound traffic is directed east then south along Hope Street and Mentieth Road (at either end of which there are pedestrian underpasses for access to the retail area), while northbound can either take the same route or go via West Hamilton Street and one-way Muir Street, passing Motherwell railway station. These sections coexist with the A723 road (running between Hamilton and Carfin either side of Motherwell), with the A721 taking precedence on maps and signage. The A721 continues south-east, now known as Brandon Street then Windmillhill Street, passing Motherwell Civic Centre and the town's police and fire stations, as well as a roundabout for the B754 Airbles Road, an important artery linking local traffic to the A723 and M74 near Strathclyde Country Park. Near to Fir Park football stadium the direction turns east, with the road going through a roundabout for Muirhouse, under the West Coast Main Line tracks (where Flemington railway station was once located) and through another roundabout for Ravenscraig and Motherwell College before entering Wishaw at the oldest part of the Craigneuk district.

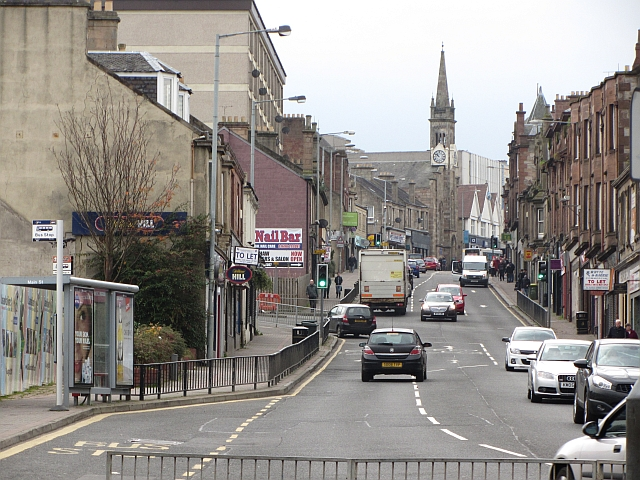
Wishaw Main Street from west

As Glasgow Road, it skirts the south of the neighbourhood, goes under the Argyle Line railway and passes University Hospital Wishaw, then passes under a different branch line of the same railway and into the town centre where it becomes part of Main Street. Prior to Wishaw Cross there is a northbound junction (Kenilworth Avenue) leading towards Coltness and Cambusnethan, relieving some congestion on the cross itself (comprising traditional narrow streets flanked on all sides by old buildings and with limited road space), where there are junctions for the short A722 (Kirk Road, north) and the B7032 (Caledonian Road, south to Pather / Netherton). The A721 continues as Stewarton Street past the Greenhead and Dimsdale neighbourhoods until it leaves Wishaw and enters the hamlet of Waterloo, at which point it meets the A71 road (leading north to Newmains and south to Overtown and Garrion Bridge) at a roundabout. Further east there is soon another major roundabout at Bogside, this time meeting the A73 road which also heads north to Newmains, and ultimately to the M8 at Newhouse.

=== Carluke and Carnwath ===
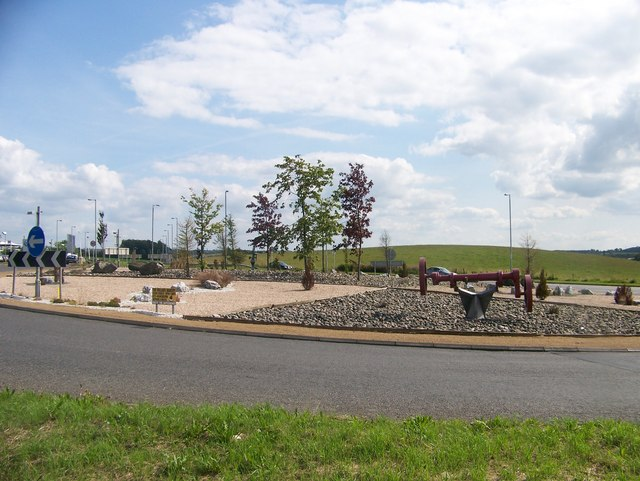
The A721 meets the A73 at Bogside, between Wishaw and Carluke

From the Bogside roundabout, the A721 is superseded by the A73 as the road heads south across the boundary of South Lanarkshire and into Carluke. At an eastbound junction with Glamis Street the A721 is restored, whilst the A73 continues south towards Lanark. Via two roundabouts at either end of Chapel Street, the A721 connects the outer parts of Carluke to its town centre, before heading east and out of the suburban environment as Carnwath Road, passing Carluke High School campus. There is then a 5 miles (8.0 km) rural stretch, interrupted only by the small village of Kilncadzow and a roundabout for the A706 (south for Lanark, north for Forth) until a T-junction meeting the A70 north of Carstairs, from where the road takes on the A70 designation for bout 3 miles (4.8 km) to the centre of Carnwath, where a mini-roundabout takes the A70 north in the direction of Edinburgh on the north flank of the Pentland Hills, and the A721 is restored still heading east.

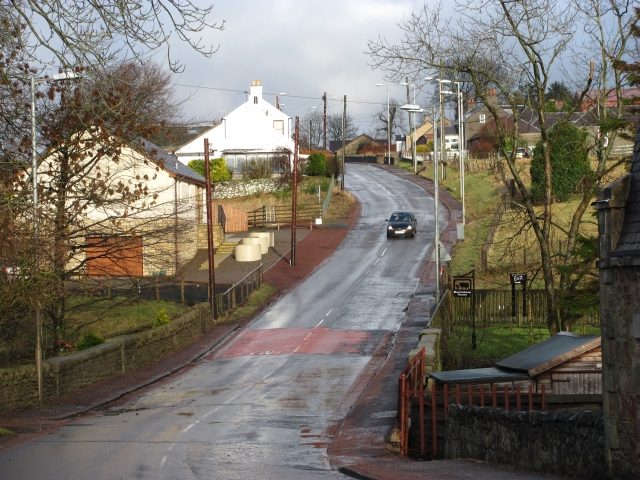
There are several gradients and bends on the road around Elsrickle

It continues in the same general direction for a further 10 miles (16 km), the main features being the hamlets of Kaimend, Newbigging and Elsrickle, a staggered junction with the A702 (north to West Linton, south to Biggar) and the local authority boundary into the Scottish Borders. A short distance further on, the A721 terminates at Kirkdean, on a junction with the A72 which at this point already shares a designation with the A701. These roads split again in either direction: to the north of Kirkdean the A72 heads east to Peebles and the A701 north to Blyth Bridge and into Midlothian; to the south the A72 heads south-west to Biggar and the A701 south all the way to Moffat and eventually to Dumfries. Most of the final section between Elsrickle and Kirkdean is referred to as 'Roman Road', and other parts of the route are also believed to have Roman origin, such as the straight section in Wishaw.

== Public transport ==
The '240' bus service, one of the primary routes by the major operator in the region, First Glasgow, runs along most of the length of the A721 within North Lanarkshire, other than using the B7001 for Viewpark and Birkenshaw (within Glasgow it mainly follows the unclassified Tollcross Road (a continuation of the A721 in the past), and the A89 Gallowgate).
