= Greenhead Moss =

Nature reserve and public park in Wishaw, North Lanarkshire, Scotland

Coordinates: 55°46′21″N 03°53′42″W

Greenhead Moss Community Nature Park
- Greenhead Moss
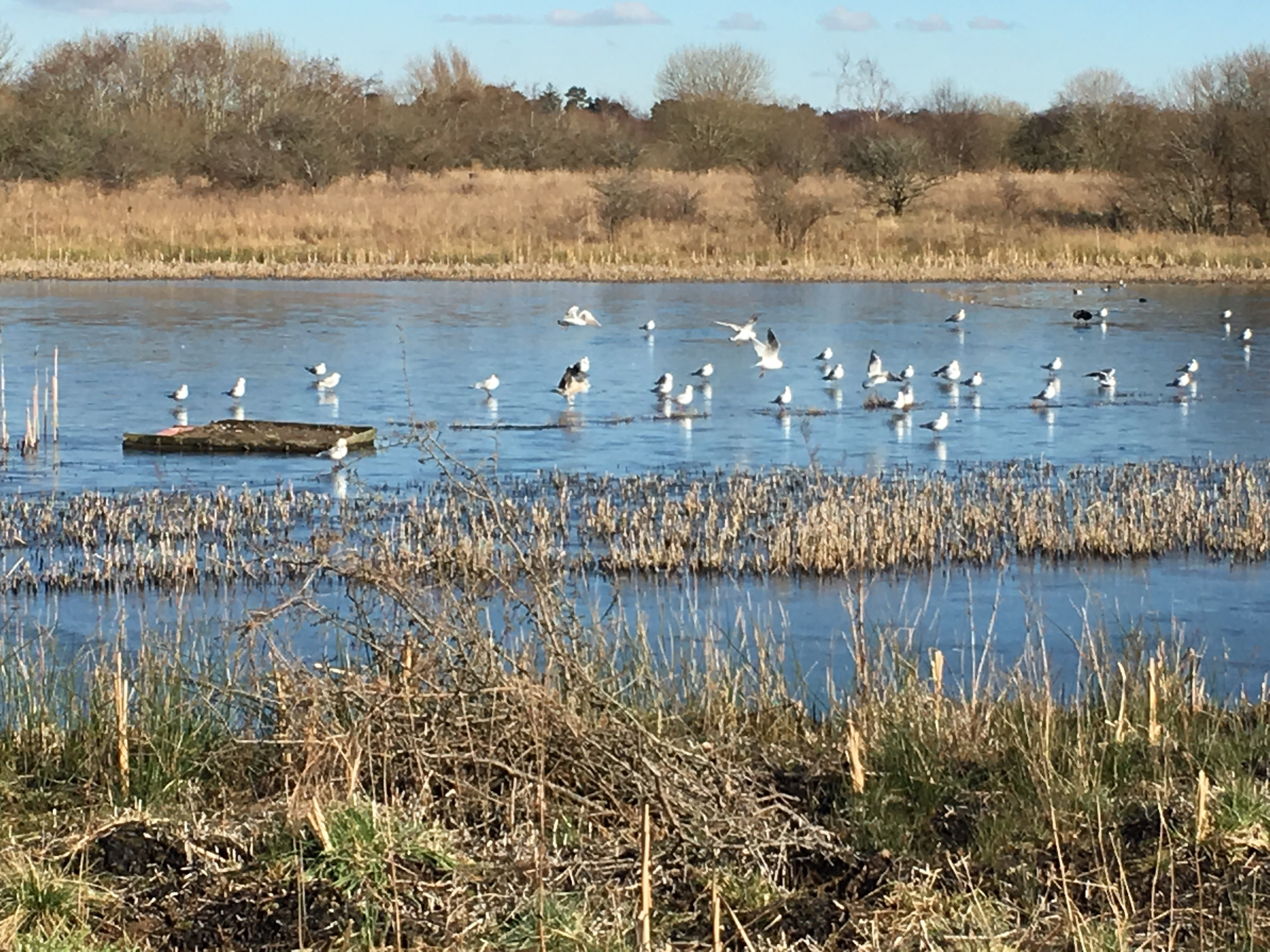
- The pond area in early spring
- Interactive map of Greenhead Moss Community Nature Park
- Location: Wishaw, North Lanarkshire
- Nearest town: Wishaw
- Area: 100 hectares (250 acres)
- Owner: North Lanarkshire Council

Greenhead Moss Community Nature Park, or simply Greenhead Moss is a nature reserve and public park in the town of Wishaw in North Lanarkshire, Scotland. Despite its small area of only 100 hectares, the park has many different flora and fauna. The most notable feature of the park is the Perchy Pond, an artificial pond known for its many Swans and Amphibians. The area is naturally occurring, and the area around the pond was designated as a Local nature reserve (LNR), in 1989, with the rest of the Moss being designated so by 2013. The main habitat is moorland and Bogs, although flower Meadows and woods are also predominant.

== History ==
According to park signs, the landscape formed around 10,000 years ago in the Mesolithic, with known habitation occurring as far back as 2,000 years ago. The marshes and peat bogs were used as a source of fuel by the Britons in ancient times. The peat in the moss was used for fuel as late as 1993. Coal mining became the industry of choice during the Industrial Revolution with OS Maps showing small coal mines and railways on the land. These were short lived however.

After the designation of the Pond as an LNR in 1989, the council acquired the land in 1999 and the community trust for the park was established. This new nature reserve lay between the Wishaw neighbourhoods of Greenhead and Cambusnethan and soon was fitted with new pathways, stairs and gates. These regeneration efforts mainly took place during the early 2000s. They were a large success in making the Moss the nature park it is today.

=== Cambusnethan Bog Body ===
On 23 March 1932, a local Wishaw worker named Gerald Ronlink was digging peat in the Moss, when he came across a fully-clothed, partly-preserved body buried about two feet down in the bog. Although the clothes were partially damaged, a unique jacket, cap, and leather shoes could be made out. Initial reports identified the body as belonging to a man who died in the 1680s, possibly a murdered Covenanter or Royalist foot soldier. More recent scholarship indicates that the man actually died in the late 18th century, meaning that he could not have been a Covenanter.

The man was around age 50, 5 ft 6 in (1.68 m) tall, with brown hair and size 7 feet. Cut marks in his cap and right shoe indicate that he may have been stabbed with a sword. It has been theorized that the man was a murder victim. His body was then buried in the wet, isolated bogs of Cambusnethan to avoid discovery. His jacket is now in the collection of the Glasgow Museums.
