= Craigneuk =

Coordinates: 55.779°N 3.953°W

- Location within North Lanarkshire
- OS grid reference: NS776557
- Council area: North Lanarkshire
- Lieutenancy area: Lanarkshire
- Country: Scotland
- Sovereign state: United Kingdom
- Post town: WISHAW
- Postcode district: ML2
- Dialling code: 01698
- Police: Scotland
- Fire: Scottish
- Ambulance: Scottish
- UK Parliament: Motherwell and Wishaw
- Scottish Parliament: Motherwell and Wishaw

Craigneuk is a suburb of Wishaw, North Lanarkshire, Scotland. The original village of Craigneuk was located in the area where Meadowhead Road meets the A721 at Craigneuk Street. It was originally part of Dalziel parish, along with the other rural weaving villages of Flemington, Motherwell and Windmillhill. Craigneuk village was located close to the boundary with Cambusnethan parish.

Mining of coal and iron ore in the 1840s lead to industrialisation and rapid population growth from rural Scotland and large numbers of migrants from Ireland. Nearby, in Cambusnethan parish the industrial communities of Shieldmuir and Berryhill were established on the road leading to Wishaw. In 1920, the joint Burgh of Motherwell and Wishaw was created and later abolished in the 1970s. In the late 1920s, the burgh council began a massive housing development program in the area to the east of Sheildmuir Street and Glasgow Road stretching from the village of Craigneuk to Berryhill. The entire area became known as Craigneuk. At the same time much of the area known as the "Berryhill Rows" was demolished to make way for the King George V Playing Fields.

The Ravenscraig Steelworks was established in the area during the 1950s. It was the main employer until it was closed in 1992 and later demolished. Ravenscraig, a new residential and commercial area, is now emerging on this site to the north east of the original village. Wishaw General Hospital was established in 2001 on the site of the original Berryhill School.

According to SIPs, the population of Craigneuk was 3,030 in 2000.

== Industry ==
Despite the closure of most of its heavy industry, Craigneuk still retains the Lanarkshire Welding company, which supply heavy steel components for the construction business, and heavy goods vehicles can often be seen on John Street transporting heavy fabricated steel items.

== Street names ==
Several of the street names to the west of Glasgow Road are named after towns made famous by sieges and battles in the Boer War, such as Ladysmith Street, Mafeking Street and Kimberley Street.

== Education ==
Craigneuk has one primary school, the non-denominational Berryhill Primary School. The original Berryhill Primary School was located on the land now occupied by Wishaw General Hospital, but the school was demolished due to mining subsidence and rebuilt in its current location on Hillcrest Avenue in the early 1970s. St. Matthews Roman Catholic Primary School in nearby Wishawhill closed in 2010. Another non denominational school, Craigneuk Public, closed in the 1960s and was used as an annexe of Cambuslang College before being converted to flats. Roman Catholic St Patricks primary, located next to the church, was closed in 1966 due to suffering from subsistence, and then demolished, with pupils going to St Matthews or St Brendans Primary in Muirhouse.

There are no high schools located in Craigneuk, but it is in the catchment area for both Dalziel High School in Motherwell and Clyde Valley High School in Overtown. Roman Catholic high schools in the catchment area include Our Lady's High School in Motherwell and St. Aidan's High School in Wishaw.

A new campus for Motherwell College was opened in August 2009 at nearby Ravenscraig. Nursery provision is also made at Berryhill Primary School for children of over 21/2 years of age, and at Craigneuk Nursery Centre for children aged 0–5 years. The same building houses an adult education centre, providing classes in computing, parenting, card making and crafts.

== Community life ==
The Craigneuk Community Centre was named the Jim Foley Community Centre in 1999 to honour the long serving local Councillor. It is the venue for many community activities including majorettes, exercise and slimming classes, services for the disabled and the Clyde Valley Community Church. Craigneuk War Memorial is located next to the community centre.

The Craigneuk & Belhaven Parish Church (Church of Scotland) opened for worship on Craigneuk Street in 1897, and which united with the former Craigneuk Parish Church in 1976 which was subsequently used for a youth employment project in 1977 before being demolished, and St Patrick's Roman Catholic Church on Shieldmuir Street in 1898 are major landmarks of the suburb. The two churches have held an ecumenical carol service at Christmas since 1976 featuring their own choirs and choirs from the local primary schools and also now hold an ecumenical service at the war memorial each Remembrance Sunday. Craigneuk and Belhaven Parish church also became linked to North Motherwell Parish Church in Motherwell in 2018. The Zakariyya Masjid, a mosque and education centre is located just off Craigneuk Street on Donnelly Way.

King George V Playing Fields is a park next to Wishaw General Hospital which has a child's swing park and a games field. It is also used by the hospital as a helicopter landing pad. There are several areas of parkland in the suburb, including a swing park in a grassy area on Broompark Road. There was also originally a swing park in a small area behind Charles Street known locally as "the Ashey" (because of it once being surfaced with red shale - i.e. "ashes") This became a haunt of drinkers and has now been abandoned due to the dangers of many years of deposited broken glass.

An amateur football team, Craigneuk Amateurs, formed in May 1995 by local Men Francis McCafferty and Scott Isaac. A new bike track was opened in 2018 near the grounds of the former St Matthews Primary school, aimed at children and teenagers interested in cycling and mountain biking. This pumptrack was designed and built by Velosolutions, leaders in the industry, and is now managed by a local enterprise called Socialtrack. Construction was managed by Central Scotland Green Network Trust on behalf of North Lanarkshire Council. The track has been so successful in supporting community regeneration amongst the young that the frequent incidents of anti-social behaviour on what was an abandoned area of land have stopped. Socialtrack announced it as the venue for the UK round of the 2019 Red Bull Pumptrack World Championships - a remarkable achievement for them and the community in so short a time.

== Transport ==
The A721 road between Motherwell and Wishaw runs through Craigneuk. From Wishaw the suburb begins after driving under the railway bridge at Glasgow Road and from Motherwell under the railway bridge at Craigneuk Street. Bus services run along Glasgow Road and through some of the residential streets operated by First Glasgow and JMB coaches with a coach service to Glasgow operated run by Stuarts of Carluke.

Shieldmuir Station has trains to Motherwell, Glasgow and Lanark, and is an important mail hub. The station opened in 1990 to give Craigneuk residents a closer alternative to Wishaw Station.

== Famous people ==
- Footballer Tommy Gemmell, who played for Celtic and Dundee and was part of the legendary Lisbon Lions squad, was born and raised in Craigneuk. A statue of Gemmell was unveiled in the town in February 2026.
- Retired MMA fighter and host of the "Leathr'd" podcast Paul Craig, who fought in the UFC and BAMMA promotions amongst others is from Craigneuk.
