= Coltness =

Suburb in North Lanarkshire, Scotland

Coordinates: 55.7902771°N 3.9131336°W

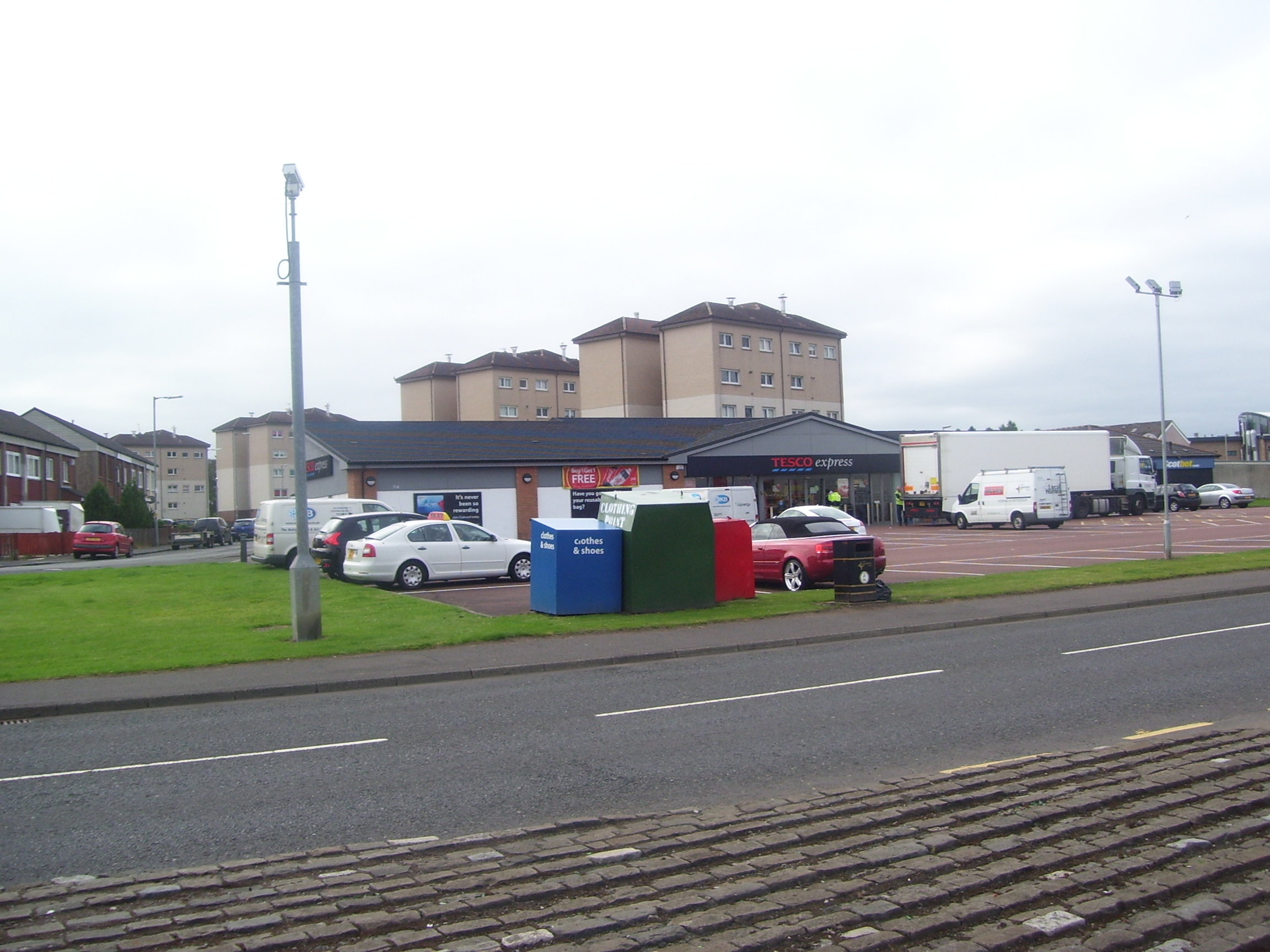
- Shops, including a Tesco Express on Coltness Road

- Location within North Lanarkshire
- OS grid reference: NS801568
- Council area: North Lanarkshire
- Lieutenancy area: Lanarkshire
- Country: Scotland
- Sovereign state: United Kingdom
- Post town: Wishaw
- Postcode district: ML2
- Dialling code: 01698
- Police: Scotland
- Fire: Scottish
- Ambulance: Scottish
- UK Parliament: Motherwell and Wishaw
- Scottish Parliament: Motherwell and Wishaw

Flats in East Coltness

Branchalwood Estate, Coltness

Coltness is the largest suburb of the town of Wishaw, North Lanarkshire, Scotland. The 2001 census indicated a population of almost 4,500.

Lying to the north east of Wishaw town centre, Coltness is an area of mainly local authority built housing, divided into the two distinct areas of East and West Coltness. The two areas have their own unique identities and are separated by Coltness Road, a main road from Wishaw to the village of Cleland.

== History ==
The area was originally nothing more than a woodland by the South Calder Water and part of the extensive estates of the Somervilles of Cambusnethan. Their lands, which stretched to the River Clyde, were sold off to pay debts. The name Coltness likely comes from coal ness, due to the abundance of coal in the area, and a ness being an archaic word for a headland. Coltness was purchased by Sir James Stewart, later Lord Provost of Edinburgh, in 1653; the 18th century economist James Steuart (Denham) lived here. The estate remained in the hands of his son, General Sir James Steuart Denham; the trustees of the general's estate sold it in 1840 to the Houldsworths, a family of newly wealthy industrialists, who lived in the imposing Coltness House until the 1950s. The village itself was incorporated into Wishaw in 1855.

The Coltness Iron Works was the prominent feature of the village, and developed during the Industrial Revolution, it was owned by the wealthy industrialist Houldsworth family, founded in 1837 by Henry Houldsworth. The iron works took advantage of the newly opened Wishaw and Coltness railway, that connected the villages with Coatbridge. It was a major employer in the area until the company folded in the 1950s, although the works themselves continued to be used as a minor railway sweeper manufacturer until 2004.

The mansion then became a residential school run by Barnardo's until the late 1970s when it was used briefly as a refugee resettlement centre for Vietnamese boat people. The building lay empty for several years, was badly vandalised and severely damaged in a fire. It was eventually demolished in the early 1980s to make way for the Woodlandsgate estate built by Barratt Homes. The former stables of Coltness House were retained and converted to flats.

== East Coltness ==
The larger of the two areas of Coltness, is the eastern half. Following the path of Coltness Road from its boundary with Cambusnethan, it proceeds almost level for approximately 1 1/2 miles (2.4 km) before descending the steep South Calder Water Valley where it meets the main artery of West Coltness, North Dryburgh Road. The housing estate of Branchalwood, built in the 1960s, contains detached and semi-detached bungalows and marks the boundary of East Coltness.

East Coltness has several bus services, with First Glasgow service number 241 running every 10 minutes from Cleland to Motherwell and First Glasgow number 93 from Coltness to Carbarns. Cleland service number 248 ran by McGill's to Coatbridge (248). There is also a once daily return express service in the peak hours to Glasgow operated by First Glasgow (X11).

Schools in Coltness include Calderbridge Primary (created by the joining of Lammermoor Primary and Coltness Primary in 2010), Saint Aidan's RC Primary and Coltness High School.

Two churches are located on Coltness Road, St. Marks Church of Scotland, and St. Aidans RC Church.

Commerce in the suburb is mainly located in the eastern side, with convenience stores located in housing areas, as well as hairdressers and takeaway foods. A petrol station, tool hire company, two supermarkets, a bakery and a pharmacy are located on Coltness Road.

== West Coltness ==
This older part of Coltness sits lower in the South Calder valley, following the path of North Dryburgh Road from its junction with Wishaw Main Street for almost 2 miles along a hilly and winding course until it meets Coltness Road near the bridge over South Calder Water valley.

This quieter of the suburb has little in the way of commercial facilities and public transport, but has become a rat run for motorists travelling to the M8 wishing to avoid the town centre.

== Origins ==
Designed in the 1950s by the then Motherwell and Wishaw Burgh Council to alleviate an acute housing shortage in the area, Coltness is just one of Wishaw's post-war planned housing developments, known locally as "schemes". The other areas of Gowkthrapple, Pather, West Crindledyke, Wishawhill and Greenhead, were all designed according to very different templates.

Coltness was designed as mix of both "back and front door" housing stock and low density flatted accommodation, with much open green space. It was built on land which had previously been marshy woodland with some minor mining operations.

Evidence of earlier mining operations are still visible, including a small slag heap in a woodland just off Kilmeny Crescent and abandoned shafts in the woodland to the east of the suburb. Some larger buildings in the suburb are reported to be suffering from minor structural problems.
