= South Wishaw Parish Church =

- South Wishaw Parish Church
- 55°46′20.3″N 3°55′8.7″W
- Location: East Academy Street, Wishaw, ML2 8GB
- Country: Scotland
- Denomination: Church of Scotland
- Website: www.southwishaw.org.uk

History
- Status: Church

Architecture
- Functional status: Active

South Wishaw Parish Church is a parish church of the Church of Scotland, serving the southern area of Wishaw, North Lanarkshire (stretching from the Main Street down to the banks of the River Clyde - including Pather, Netherton, and the southern part of the city centre). It is within the Church of Scotland's Presbytery of Forth Valley and Clydesdale.

== The building ==
The main church building was designed by Alexander Hinshelwood and constructed in 1874. It is described as a Gothic, gabled rectangular-plan church with: a square 3-stage belltower to NE corner with stone spire, squared yellow sandstone coursers with ashlar margins, set-back gabletted buttresses with sawtooth coping and hooded pointed-arch windows with chamfered reveals.

The original interior is described as a galleried interior, entered from the narthex with flanking stairs to gallery, boarded dado and timber pews, cast-iron columns supporting panelled gallery around three sides, with communion table in front of ornately carved timber pulpit with stair access and timber gothic panelled organ and case behind.

The Church Hall was designed by Malcolm Ross and constructed in 1903. This provided much-needed space with a large hall, small hall, kitchen and toilets; it originally contained the church officer's accommodation, now extra hall and office space.

== History ==
South Wishaw Parish Church was formed by the union of the former Thornlie and Chalmers churches in 2004. The suite of buildings chosen by the Church of Scotland for use of the new united congregation was the buildings on East Academy Street (formerly Chalmers Church). Presently the redundant buildings (Thornlie Church, Hall and Manse along with Chalmers Manse) were marketed and sold. A new manse for the Manse family was purchased just outside the parish boundary but within walking distance of the church.

== Refurbishment ==
The church and hall accommodation were refurbished during 2012 and 2013. The original galleried interior was transformed by the removal of the side galleries, the downstairs pews and the pipe organ. The original narthex area has been enlarged and a glass wall inserted linking the sanctuary to the narthex. A disabled toilet has been installed in the narthex. The floor is made of engineered oak, and the seating is now flexible and comfortable. A multi-media system was installed with screens and monitors through the sanctuary, allowing multiple uses, with internet and TV access.

Rev Dr Klaus of Buwert noted that the large hall has been transformed. The old stage area has been removed and the new modern and industrial kitchen has been installed. Above this area there is a much needed storage. The old kitchen area has been converted into a computer suite with 10 internet enabled computers, for the community members usage.

Currently, there is one final phase of the refurbishment outstanding. It is hoped that the entrance area into the hall accommodation will be expanded to create a meeting place, that can be utilized along with the improved facilities.

== Ministry ==
The Rev Dr Klaus of Buwert, LLB BD served as minister until October 2013 when he translated to Muthil with Trinity Gask and Kinkell in the Presbytery of Perth. Prior to serving in Wishaw, Klaus was minister of the Linked Charged of Kinlochleven with Nether Lochaber from 1981 - 1999. Klaus was called to serve in Wishaw initially in 1999 to the congregation of Thornlie Church. Thornlie Church closed in 2004 and was merged with Chalmers Church in the Chalmers building to form Wishaw: South Wishaw Parish Church.

The Rev Terence C Moran was inducted as the minister on 27 August 2015.

In 2021, the church opened a New Life Recovery Hub for locals who are "struggling with life controlling issues"; this is open two days a week and runs alongside a food bank.
