= Dimsdale (Wishaw) =

Suburb of Wishaw, Scotland

Dimsdale is a residential area of Wishaw in North Lanarkshire, Scotland. It is located next to fellow Wishaw suburbs Greenhead and Waterloo.

Dimsdale is located between the A721 (that connects to Wishaw Main Street and the busy A71 road) and the Wishaw Deviation Line (that connects to the West Coast Main Line, though no passenger service trains stop in the suburb).

Dimsdale was the location of a hospital. It appears in OS maps as far back as the 1890s. From the 1920s to 1960s it dealt with tuberculosis and fever patients. The hospital was demolished by 1990.
