= Nertherton =

Netherton may refer to:

- Netherton, Cumbria
- Netherton, Kirklees
- Netherton, Merseyside
- Netherton, North Lanarkshire
- Netherton, Peterborough
- Netherton, Wakefield
- Netherton, Dudley, West Midlands
