= Enrico Cocozza =

British film director; Scottish film director

- Born: Enrico Cocozza; 6 November 1921; Wishaw Scotland.
- Died: 27 December 1997 (aged 76)
- Other name: Cocozza

Enrico Cocozza (6 November 1921 – 27 December 1997), was a Scottish filmmaker who won many film awards during the 1940s and 1950s. His often surreal films were mainly filmed in and around the town of Wishaw in Scotland, where his family owned the popular Belhaven Cafe. These include Chick's Day (1950), a prize winner at the 1951 Scottish Amateur Film Festival, The Living Ghost (1957), and Glasgow's Docklands (1959). Illness later forced him to give up making films and he spent most of his working life teaching at the University of Strathclyde in Glasgow. In 2001 he was the subject of the Channel 4 documentary Artery: the Story of Enrico Cocozza.
