= South Calder Water =

River in Scotland

Coordinates: 55°47′47″N 4°01′45″W

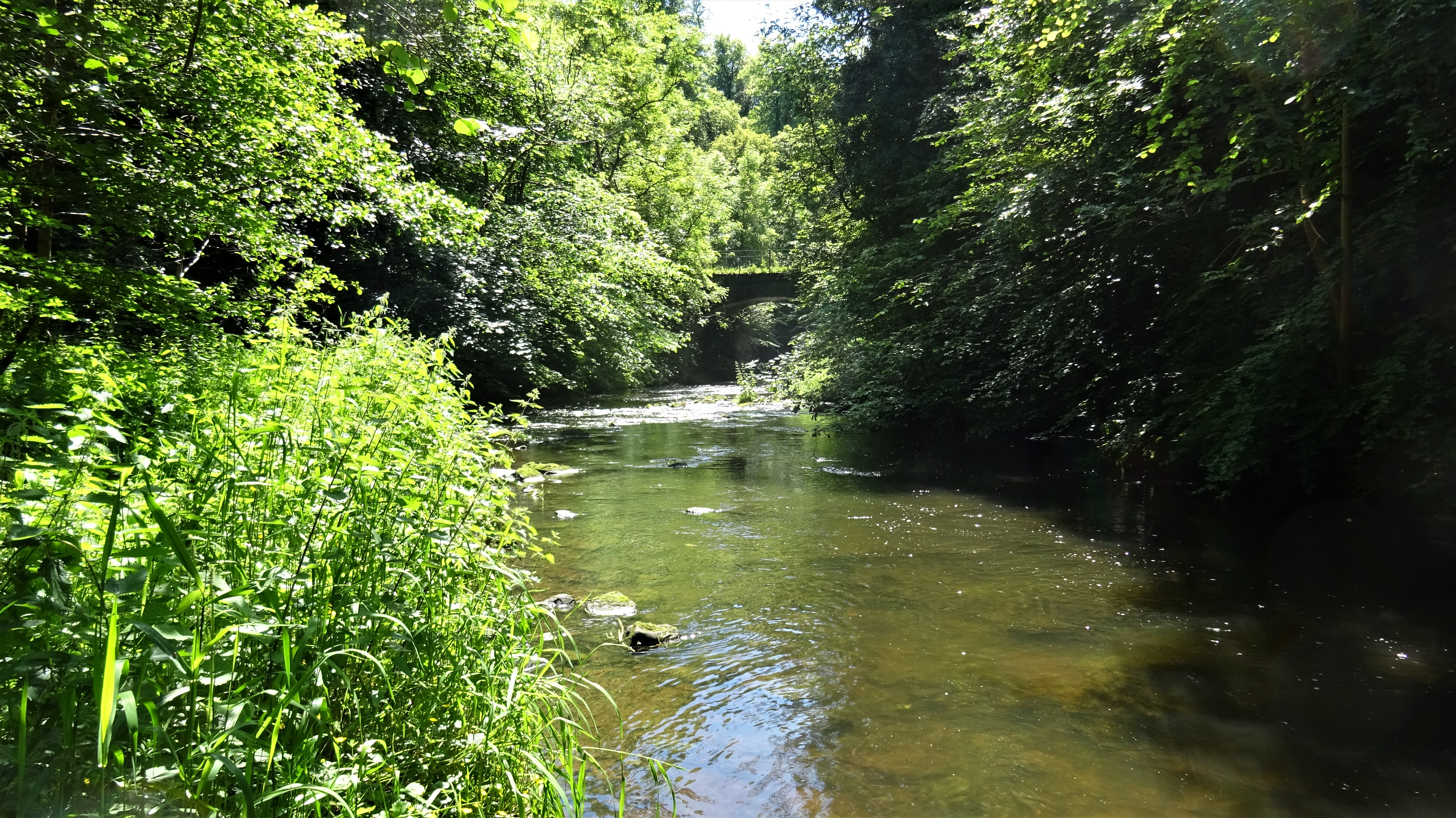
- , The river at Coltness

Location
- Country: United Kingdom (Scotland)

Basin features
- Cities: Shotts, Allanton, Bonkle, Newmains, Wishaw, Coltness, Craigneuk, Forgewood, Motherwell

The South Calder Water, known locally as "The Cawder", or simply "Calder", is a river in Scotland. It runs west from the high plateau between Shotts and Fauldhouse to its joining with the much larger River Clyde.

The high plateau is also the watershed of the River Almond, which flows east into the River Forth.

== Etymology ==
The etymology of the name is not confirmed but is most likely from the Cumbric language, a language closely related to modern Welsh and was spoken across the Strathclyde area throughout the Early Middle Ages to about 1200 AD. The proposed etymology would come from the words "caled dwr", meaning "hard water", most likely either referring to the strength of the current or the rocky riverbed beneath the water.

== History ==
It is known that the ancient Romans constructed roads through Wishaw and Motherwell not too far from the river, and the ruins of the fort at Bothwellhaugh lies at the convergence of the Calder with the Clyde. Supposedly, a bridge that crosses the river at Bothwellhaugh was indeed built by the Romans, but the true age of the bridge is doubted.

In the early 1600s, a large manor house was constructed on the banks of the river and named Wishaw House, as well as the purchase of several local farmsteads. It is thought that this house was inherited through generations of nobles until it was abandoned and eventually demolished in the 1950s.

== Course ==
The South Calder Water follows a short course of approximately ten miles (16 kilometres), during which it winds round Shotts, Wishaw and Motherwell before flowing into the Strathclyde Loch.

Between its source at Calderhead and Newmains the stream follows a wide glacial valley and passes the villages of Bonkle and Murdostoun Castle, but after Newmains, until its end at Strathclyde Loch in Motherwell, it cuts through a very deep and meandering valley. It lies on the edge of areas of Wishaw such as Bonkle and Coltness. This valley was filled in at Ravenscraig during the construction of Ravenscraig steelworks to provide a large flat area. The river is therefore placed in a "cut and cover" tunnel as it passes for approximately one-half mile (800 metres) underneath the site, before reappearing at Jerviston. Driving across the now derelict Ravenscraig site gives no clues as to the underground river flowing below.

The river ends at Strathclyde Loch, where it used to join directly with the River Clyde. The River Clyde was diverted about one mile (1.5 km) west of this point in the 1960s to create the large man made loch, which is now fed purely by water from the South Calder Water.

The river is referenced in man-made features near its course, including Calder public park in Coursington (Motherwell), Calderbridge Primary School in Coltness (Wishaw) and Calderhead High School in Shotts.

== See also ==
- North Calder Water, also follows through North Lanarkshire to the Clyde from near Caldercruix to Daldowie
- Rotten Calder, flows through South Lanarkshire to the Clyde from near Eaglesham to Newton
