= Alison Turriff =

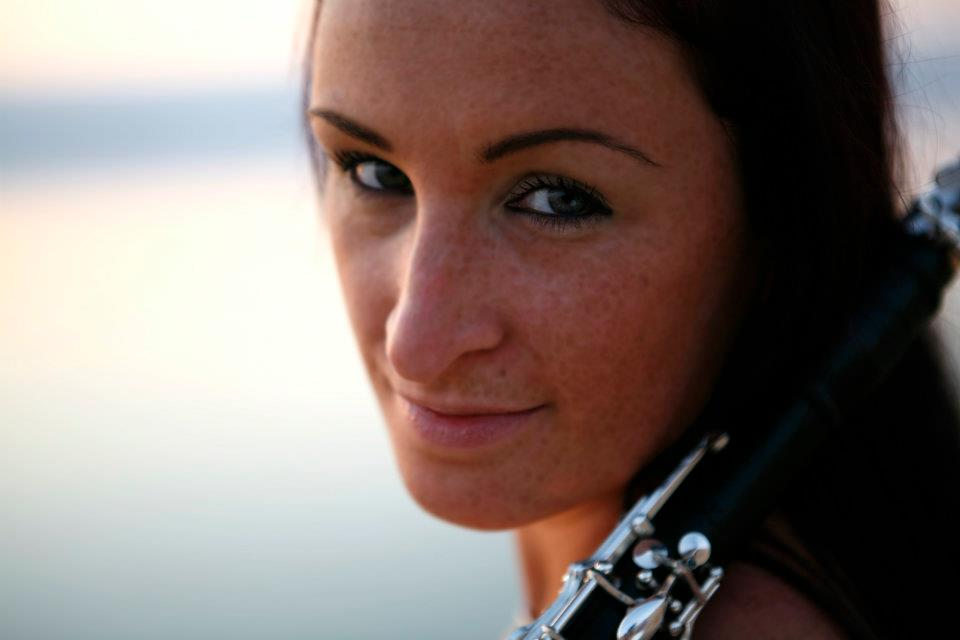

Background information
- Born: 10 August 1984 (age 41)
- Origin: Lanark, Scotland
- Genres: Classical, Contemporary, Jazz, Folk, New-age
- Occupations: Musician, Educator, Composer
- Years active: 2002–present
- Website: alison-turriff.com

Alison Turriff (born 10 August 1984 in Lanark, Scotland) is a Scottish folk fusion clarinettist, composer, recording artist, researcher, producer and artist for world leading clarinet makers Buffet Crampon.

== Early life ==
Turriff spent her early years in Wishaw, North Lanarkshire, Scotland. Despite showing an early interest in music, particularly the piano and composition, she didn't receive any tuition until a school teacher recognized her talent for singing. At age 10 she entered and won 3rd place in a local Robert Burns competition singing "A rosebud by my early walk". From this she was quickly encouraged to take up an instrument and decided on the clarinet because she "didn't know what it looked like" and thought it "might be interesting". Despite this early start Turriff's clarinet studies didn't take off until she was 16 when she began having lessons with her high school music teacher. Within 18 months she had passed her grade 8, secured several places to further her studies at music college and won the North Lanarkshire 'Musician of the year' award.

== Education ==
Turriff received a Bachelor of Music from Royal Welsh College of Music and Drama studying with Principal Clarinet of Welsh National Opera, Leslie Craven. During her studies she participated in an exchange programme which took her to Barcelona to study with Spanish soloist Joan Enric Lluna at Escola Superior de Música de Catalunya. Turriff then furthered her studies with Lluna at Trinity College of Music, London where she won the Harold Clarke prize for woodwind and was awarded a Master of Music with Distinction. Turriff then took lessons in Paris with 'supersoliste' from the Paris Opera, Philippe Cuper.

== Performing and premiers ==
As a soloist Turriff has toured and performed throughout Europe and Middle East and performed at leading venues such as Wigmore Hall, Wales Millennium Centre, Barbican, St David's Hall and St John's, Smith Square. In 2008 she gave the UK premier of Alexandre Tansman's clarinet concerto in a performance that was hailed by the critics as "ravishing" and "one to keep in the memory". Turriff also performed Steve Reich's City Life at the opening celebrations of London's newest concert venue, Kings Place, and pioneered the electro acoustic, folk infused master work, Alt.Music.Ballistix by Nikola Resanovic in its first performance at the Wigmore Hall.

== Research ==
During her studies in Spain, Turriff researched and wrote the first extended work in English about the traditional music from the Catalan speaking areas of Spain. As her masters' dissertation she wrote about the Polish folk music influences in Witold Lutoslawski's works throughout the 1950s. Both pieces are pending publication.

== Recording work ==
Turriff has recorded under the Baton of Edward Gardner for an orchestral project with BP celebrating their centenary. She has also recorded works by Alan Hovhannes for Naxos under the baton of American conductor Keith Brion in a project which was dedicated to the memory of Lady Evelyn Barbirolli, widow of Sir John Barbirolli.

Turriff's first solo album, titled Distant Shores, was released on 11 November 2011 and is a mix of folk styles works from throughout the world within a classical framework.

== Charity work ==
Turriff is patron of The Sky Project in Shortlees, Scotland, which works to support significantly disadvantaged young people in the area. In conjunction with her work, she was interviewed and appeared on Scottish television on 9 September 2011 to raise awareness of the issue of child poverty in Scotland.

== Discography ==
- Distant Shores (2011)
