= Frank S. Walsh =

Frank S. Walsh (born 1953 in Wishaw, North Lanarkshire) is a British-born neuroscientist. He is best known for his work on the understanding of the role of cell adhesion molecules in the development and regeneration of the nervous system. He is the author of over 250 publications in peer-reviewed journals.

In 2008 he was made a Corresponding Fellow of the Royal Society of Edinburgh, and in 2007 became a Fellow of King's College London. He has also received honorary degrees from the Universities of Perugia and Bologna in Italy, and the University of Strathclyde and University of Dundee in Scotland.

Walsh started his scientific career with an undergraduate degree in biochemistry from the University of Strathclyde (1974)and a subsequent PhD in biochemistry from University College London with the research being carried out at the MRC National Institute for Medical Research(1977). His post-doctoral training was conducted under the tutelage of the Nobel prize winner Marshall Nirenberg at the NIH in Bethesda, Maryland, USA (1977–79).

From 2002 to 2009 he was executive vice president of discovery research at Wyeth, a leading pharmaceutical company in Collegeville Pennsylvania, US. In this role he has been responsible for overseeing the transition of more than 80 novel drug candidates into clinical development for a number of devastating diseases such as Alzheimer's disease, stroke, schizophrenia, cancer, diabetes, osteoarthritis, rheumatoid arthritis and COPD. In 2012 he formed a new biotechnology company called Ossianix to develop biological therapeutics for serious diseases of the brain and other organ systems. www.ossianix.com. The company is based in Philadelphia, US, and Stevenage, UK.

He was Sir William Dunn Professor and head of experimental pathology at the United Medical and Dental Schools from 1989, and research dean from 1994 until 1997 when he joined SmithKline Beecham as vice president of neuroscience research. With the creation of GlaxoSmithKline from the merger of SmithKline Beecham and Glaxo Wellcome, he became senior vice president and head of the company's Neurology-Centre of Excellence for Drug Discovery.

In addition to his corporate roles, he holds visiting professorships at King's College London, the University College Dublin, and was elected to the Academy of Medical Sciences (London) in 2003. In addition, he has been chairman of the Muscular Dystrophy Campaign research committee, a Trustee of Spinal Research, a visiting examiner at King's College London, an adviser to the college's MRC Centre for Developmental Neurobiology and a special advisor to the Wolfson Centre for Age-Related Diseases. He was also joint editor-in-chief of the journal Molecular and Cellular Neuroscience.
