= Orbiston, Ohio =

- Unincorporated community
- Location within Ohio Location within the United States
- Coordinates: 39°29′08″N 82°10′07″W
- Country: United States
- State: Ohio
- County: Hocking
- Township: Ward
- Elevation: 699 ft (213 m)
- Time zone: UTC-5 (Eastern (EST))
  - Summer (DST): UTC-4 (EDT)
- Area code: 740
- GNIS feature ID: 1076577

Orbiston is an unincorporated community in Hocking County, Ohio, United States. Orbiston is located along Ohio State Route 78, and is 1.8 miles (2.9 km) north-northeast of Buchtel.

== History ==
An iron blast furnace was built in Orbiston in 1877. A post office was established at Orbiston in 1877, and remained in operation until 1924.

Orbiston grew quickly in the early days after Ogden Furnace was built in 1877 by the Ogden Iron Company. The furnace was sold a few times over the years and was eventually owned by the Hocking Iron Co. who changed the name to Helen Furnace.

Orbiston had a population of about 500 in 1883 and had a school that existed until sometime around 1930.

Most of the residents of Orbiston were buried in Bethel Ridge Cemetery, which is just north of where the town was, on Goose Run Rd.
