= Ravenscraig =

Village in North Lanarkshire, Scotland

Coordinates: 55.792017°N 3.967524°W

Ravenscraig: Scottish Gaelic: Creag na Fithiche
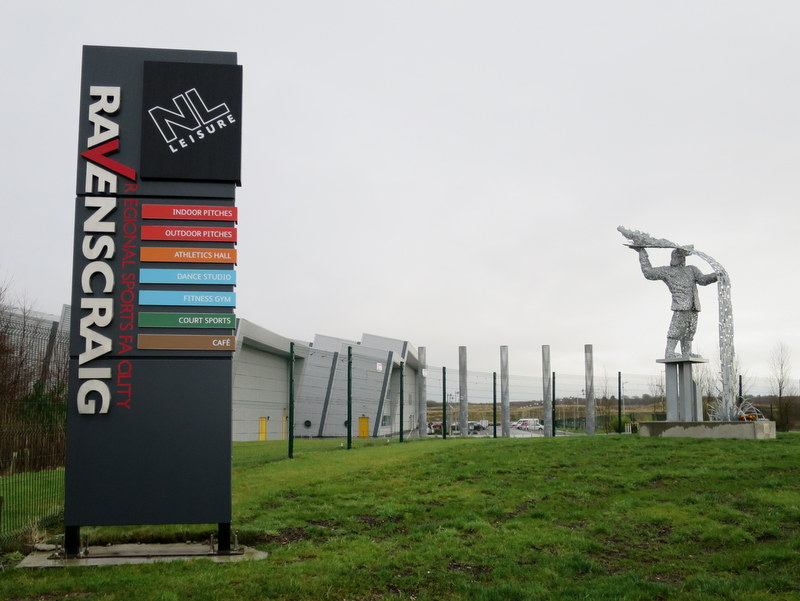
- Ravenscraig Sports Facility, 2016.

- Location within North Lanarkshire
- OS grid reference: NS756563
  - Edinburgh: 41 mi (66 km)
  - London: 393 mi (632 km)
- Council area: North Lanarkshire
- Lieutenancy area: Lanarkshire
- Country: Scotland
- Sovereign state: United Kingdom
- Post town: MOTHERWELL
- Postcode district: ML1
- Dialling code: 01698
- Police: Scotland
- Fire: Scottish
- Ambulance: Scottish
- UK Parliament: Motherwell and Wishaw
- Scottish Parliament: Motherwell and Wishaw

Ravenscraig is a housing development and historic village located in North Lanarkshire, Scotland, one point five miles (two kilometres) north-east of central Motherwell. Ravenscraig was formerly the site of Ravenscraig steelworks; once the largest hot strip steel mill in western Europe, the steelworks closed in 1992, and is now almost totally demolished. After over two decades of lying derelict, the empty land was redeveloped in the 2010s, with new houses and amenities being constructed on a large scale, with construction still ongoing into the 2020s. The main contributors to this project were Wilson Bowden Developments Ltd, Scottish Enterprise and Tata Steel Europe.

== Location ==
Located in North Lanarkshire, Ravenscraig lies between the towns of Wishaw and Motherwell and the villages of Carfin and Newarthill, an area with a combined population of over 120,000.

Ravenscraig is only some ten minutes' drive from junctions with both the M74 motorway between Glasgow and Carlisle, and the M8 motorway between Glasgow and Edinburgh (and those cities' airports).

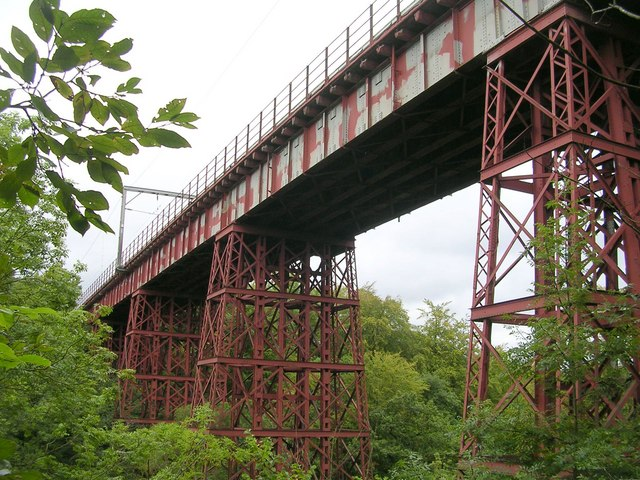
Freight line railway viaduct over the South Calder Water

A railway line (between Holytown and Wishaw, primarily for freight) directly bisects the site, featuring a large viaduct over the South Calder Water, and another (the West Coast Main Line and Argyle Line) runs on the south-western edge of the site. In 2005, the local authority proposed to either move Shieldmuir railway station almost 1 mile (1.6 km) to the north or close it and reopen the former Flemington station nearby (closed in 1965), to cater for the Ravenscraig development, but the plan was subsequently dropped in 2007.

== History ==
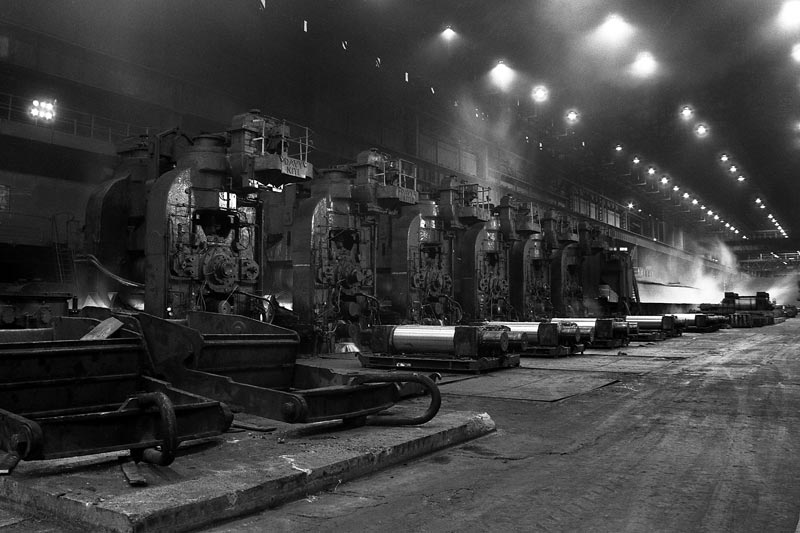
Ravenscraig Rolling Mills in 1985

Ravenscraig Steel Works, as well as the former settlement of the same title, took its name from the nearby secluded cliff face called Ravenscraig (translated as Raven's Cliff or Cliff of the Ravens) situated in the valley of the South Calder Water, north of the steelworks site, first shown on the 1st Edition Ordnance Survey Map of 1859.

A major expansion of Colvilles, the largest steel manufacturer in the United Kingdom before World War II, was approved in July 1954 by the Iron and Steel Board.

In 1954 the first stages of development began in Ravenscraig, turning a green field into a site for steelworks. By 1957 several coke ovens, a by-products plant, a blast furnace and an open hearth melting shop with three steelmaking furnaces were built, and by 1959 a stripmill was complete.

The closure of Ravenscraig in 1992 signalled the end of large-scale steel making in Scotland, and was the cause of a loss of 770 jobs, with another 10,000 job losses directly and indirectly linked to the closure.

Prior to regeneration, Ravenscraig was one of the largest derelict sites in Europe measuring over 1,125 acres (455 hectares) in size.

== Regeneration ==
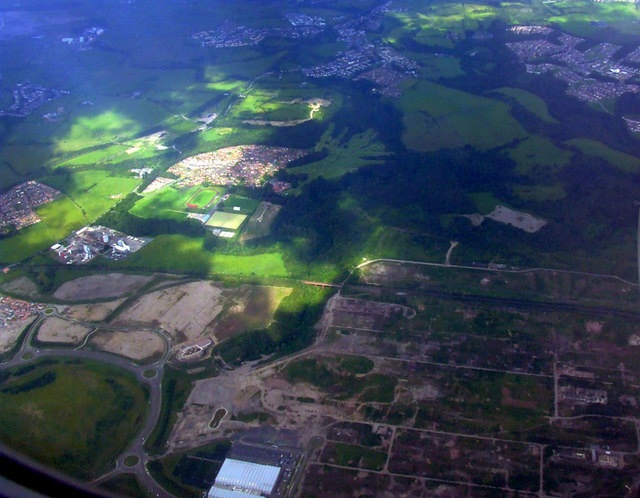
Ravenscraig from the air

After many years of planning, Ravenscraig was to be 'regenerated' and rebuilt by three equal shareholders: Wilson Bowden Developments Ltd, Scottish Enterprise and Tata Steel. The project was one of the largest regenerations in Europe, with 400 acres (160 hectares) being developed.

Part of the development was to create new habitats for the wildlife already living in the area, such as deer, foxes, hares, otters, badgers, watervoles, butterflies and birds such as the wader, song thrush and the little ringed plover, with an Ecological Clerk of Works appointed to 'ensure compliance with Ravenscraig Ltd.’s aims and objectives by all developers and contractors.' Plans were implemented to stop the decontamination of the South Calder Water, which suffered from the industrial activity and toxic chemicals in the area. There are also plantations designed to encourage diversity in the site wildlife, including reforestation of local woodland.

The plans for the regeneration generated a certain amount of controversy; local residents and businesses were worried about the proposed shopping facilities, fearing their construction would cause exiting businesses and town centres (e.g. Motherwell and Wishaw) will suffer. Nearby shopping centres such as Motherwell Shopping Centre, the Regent Shopping Centre in Hamilton and East Kilbride Shopping Centre complained that new shopping facilities may take away their regular customers, a statement that North Lanarkshire Council leader Jim McCabe disputed. A new dual carriageway that would link the new town with the M8 and M74 motorways was given approval, with an extra £10 million to bring the project forward agreed in June 2012. The new carriageway would also travel through neighbouring North Lanarkshire settlements, Motherwell and Carfin.

The first major development, the new Motherwell College in the south of the site, was the first to be completed, officially opening in January 2010. The college aimed to attract in excess of 20,000 students. The £29 million Ravenscraig Regional Sports Facility, located in the centre of the site, was opened on 4 October 2010, and has been used as training camps for the 2012 London Olympics in London and the 2014 Commonwealth Games in Glasgow. The complex was also the host facility for the 2011 International Children's Games. Over the course of several years, several separate new build estates were constructed, mostly in the north of the site. A central feeder road (Robberhall Road / New Craig Road, featuring six roundabouts in anticipation of many branch roads being required for housing clusters, although many of these connections were not put into use in its first decade) was built running between the A721 road at Craigneuk to the south and the A723 road at Carfin to the north.

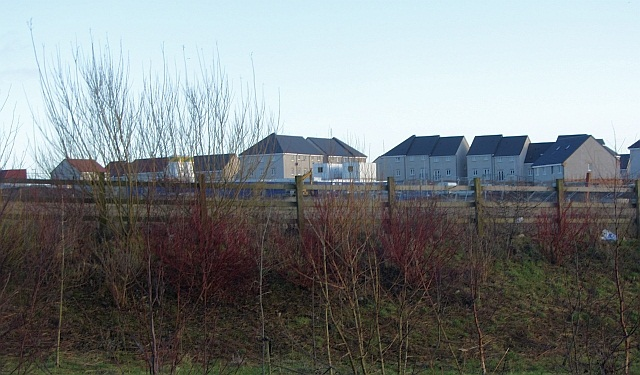
New homes being constructed on site, January 2012

Phase two of the construction, which included shopping facilities, was planned to start around mid-2012. The housing development of Phoenix Park with 850 new homes, was partially completed by 2012. Another important step towards full completion of the project was met at that time, with funding being approved for the second phase. In September 2012, the first building of a new BRE Innovation Park was opened, with the visitor centre building officially completed. A total of ten energy-efficient buildings were expected to be built in the park. In November 2012, plans were also unveiled to build a new Marston's pub-restaurant directly to the north-east of the sports facility. Despite favourable first impressions, the proposal did not receive planning permission at the time.

Progress slowed on the development due to adverse economic factors, and a revised masterplan was submitted in 2018, being approved the following year. The planning report, which differed from the earlier master vision with the amount of retail space reduced by around 60% and no short term prospect for a new railway station, anticipated that progress would be slow but steady across the site, not being completed until around 2045.

As of 2024, hundreds of homes had been built in the area, however the project was some way from being fully completed. The promised Marston's pub / restaurant and small hotel, named "Raven's Cliff" was constructed in 2018. In March 2022, a park and playground to the south of the sports facility named 'The Craig' was opened by Anne, Princess Royal (who had also opened the college 12 years earlier); this is separate from a larger, less formal area of green space on a hill with a roughly circular footprint on the northern edge of the site.

=== Transport ===
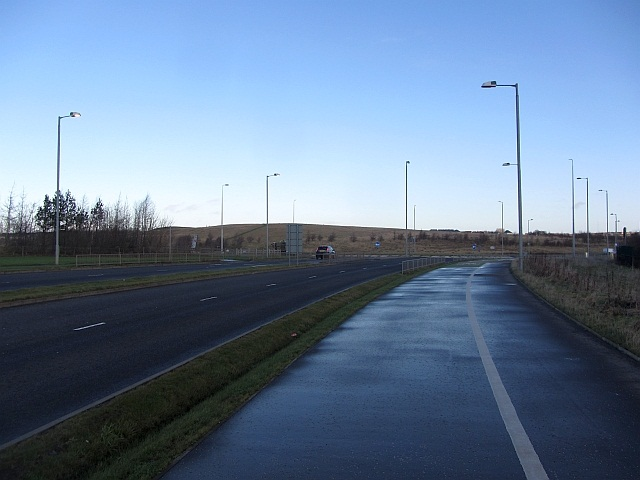
The main road in Ravenscraig

In future, the Greenlink Cycle Path may be extended to connect Ravenscraig with a direct route to Strathclyde Country Park.

The 92 bus service is due to be introduced in 2023 by Stuarts Coaches and will link Ravenscraig with Motherwell.

A dual-carriageway bridge underneath the West Coast Main Line railway tracks was constructed in 2023 in order to connect a new section of link road in Ravenscraig to an extension to the existing Airbles Road (B754) town centre bypass.

=== Motherwell FC ===
The local professional football team, Motherwell Football Club was one of the possible purchasers of the site for a new stadium, leaving behind their home of 113 years, Fir Park. In 2008, Mark McGhee, then-manager of the club, had said that he and the directors held tentative discussions with North Lanarkshire Council about building the new stadium on the site. Despite indications that the move may be in process of becoming a reality, a move to Ravenscraig in the short term would be impossible.

== See also ==
- List of places in North Lanarkshire
