= Greenhead (Wishaw) =

Suburb of Wishaw, Scotland

Coordinates: 55.7720954°N 3.9072167°W

- Location within North Lanarkshire
- OS grid reference: NS803546
- Council area: North Lanarkshire
- Lieutenancy area: Lanarkshire
- Country: Scotland
- Sovereign state: United Kingdom
- Post town: WISHAW
- Postcode district: ML2
- Dialling code: 01698
- Police: Scotland
- Fire: Scottish
- Ambulance: Scottish
- UK Parliament: Motherwell and Wishaw
- Scottish Parliament: Motherwell and Wishaw Central Scotland

Greenhead is a small neighbourhood in the town of Wishaw, North Lanarkshire, Scotland. It is situated to the south of Cambusnethan, and to the west of Waterloo.

Even though this part of Wishaw is mainly residential housing, Greenhead does have a few places of note, such as Cambusnethan Cemetery and Greenhead Moss Community Nature Park.

Since it is close to Wishaw Main Street, Greenhead has no shops. The neighbourhood can be accessed either from the A721 or A722 roads.

== Notable residents ==
- Archibald Smith of Jordanhill FRSE (1813-1872)
