= List of King George V Playing Fields in the United Kingdom =

There were initially 471 King George V Playing Fields in the United Kingdom. Details of all the current King George V Fields can be found here

== Northern Ireland ==
Northern Ireland
Location	Formal name	Local name (if any)	Coordinates	Dates		External links
Location	Formal name	Local name (if any)	Coordinates	Purchase	Opening	External links
Belfast	King George V Playing Fields		54.6026°N 5.8894°W		1960	Belfast City Council

== Scotland ==
East Renfrewshire
Location	Formal name	Local name (if any)	National Grid Reference	Dates		External links
Location	Formal name	Local name (if any)	National Grid Reference	Purchase	Opening	External links
Clarkston	King George V Fields	Overlee Park / Overlee Playing Fields	NS943652			

Glasgow
Location	Formal name	Local name (if any)	National Grid Reference	Dates		External links
Location	Formal name	Local name (if any)	National Grid Reference	Purchase	Opening	External links
Glasgow (Carnwadric)	King George V Park		NS546600			

Renfrewshire
Location	Formal name	Local name (if any)	National Grid Reference	Dates		External links
Location	Formal name	Local name (if any)	National Grid Reference	Purchase	Opening	External links
Renfrew	King George V Memorial Playing Fields	The KG 5s	NS506666			UK Running Track Directory

North Lanarkshire
Location	Formal name	Local name (if any)	National Grid Reference	Dates		External links
Location	Formal name	Local name (if any)	National Grid Reference	Purchase	Opening	External links
Wishaw	King George's Field	King George The 5th	NS785551			UK Running Track Directory

West Lothian
Location	Formal name	Local name (if any)	National Grid Reference	Dates		External links
Location	Formal name	Local name (if any)	National Grid Reference	Purchase	Opening	External links
Whitburn	King George V Playing Fields		NS943652			UK Running Track Directory; Commons image

== Wales ==
Glamorgan
Location	Formal name	Local name (if any)	National Grid Reference	Dates		External links
Location	Formal name	Local name (if any)	National Grid Reference	Purchase	Opening	External links
Pontardawe	Parc Ynysderw		SN718033	2003	2003	NPFA: Field Focus, Autumn 2003
St Donats	King George's Field		SS943682			
Tonypandy	Athletic Ground		SS986926			UK Running Track Directory

Pembrokeshire
Location	Formal name	Local name (if any)	National Grid Reference	Dates		External links
Location	Formal name	Local name (if any)	National Grid Reference	Purchase	Opening	External links
Saundersfoot	King George's Field St Issels		SN133047		1954	Extract from the Central Register of Charities maintained by the Charity Commission for England and Wales

Ceredigion - Cardigan.
