= Elsrickle =

Coordinates: 55°40′35″N 3°29′31″W

Elsrickle: Scottish Gaelic: An Eileirg
- Location within South Lanarkshire
- OS grid reference: NT059432
- Council area: South Lanarkshire
- Lieutenancy area: Lanarkshire
- Country: Scotland
- Sovereign state: United Kingdom
- Post town: BIGGAR
- Postcode district: ML12
- Police: Scotland
- Fire: Scottish
- Ambulance: Scottish
- UK Parliament: Dumfriesshire, Clydesdale and Tweeddale
- Scottish Parliament: Clydesdale

Elsrickle is a village in South Lanarkshire, Scotland. It lies on Blackmount Hill, which is at the end of the Pentland Hills.

An elrick is an old place name associated with hunting and is derived from the Gaelic eileirg. In this, large animals in the high ground are chased by dogs to locations where the ground slopes more steeply so that the animals are likely to fall, at which point they can be killed off by waiting hunters. This is an ancient technique also used by Native Americans. Examination of the topography of Elsrickle does not contradict this hypothesis.
