= North Motherwell =

Coordinates: 55.7950903°N 4.0109646°W

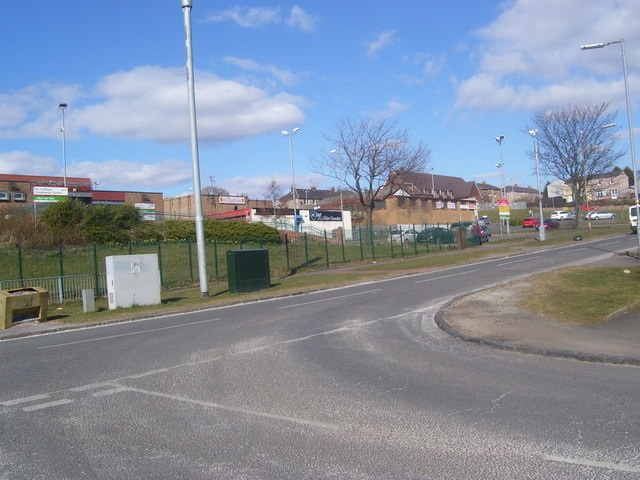
- Local services in North Motherwell, on Logans Road.

- Location within North Lanarkshire
- OS grid reference: NS740575
- Council area: North Lanarkshire
- Lieutenancy area: Lanarkshire
- Country: Scotland
- Sovereign state: United Kingdom
- Post town: MOTHERWELL
- Postcode district: ML1
- Dialling code: 01698
- Police: Scotland
- Fire: Scottish
- Ambulance: Scottish
- UK Parliament: Motherwell and Wishaw
- Scottish Parliament: Motherwell and Wishaw Central Scotland

North Motherwell is an area of Motherwell, North Lanarkshire, Scotland. Despite its name, North Motherwell actually lies in the south west of the town. North Motherwell is in between the West Coast Main Line, the south calder river, the south calder walkway and Hamilton road, with the exception of the area around Braedale Park.

The area consists of mainly detached or semi-detached housing. There are six main roads situated in North Motherwell: The Loaning, Birrens Road, Watling Street, Fort Street, Logans Road and Ladywell road, that lead to the main roads into Motherwell and beyond. These roads are where virtually all of North Motherwell's local services are located. Services include a post office, convenience store and a bar.

== Education ==
North Motherwell is also home to 3 primary schools, St Bernadette’s Primary, Logans Primary and Ladywell Primary (both being non denominational).

== Transport ==
The West Coast Main Line by-passes to the north of the neighbourhood, and there is Motherwell railway station which serves Motherwell in North Lanarkshire, Scotland. It lies on the West Coast Main Line (WCML), and is served also by Argyle Line trains of the Glasgow suburban railway network. It is the penultimate stop on the northbound WCML before Glasgow. There are four platforms of various length in use at Motherwell. The station is located next to the town's main shopping arcade, Motherwell Shopping Centre.

== Community Facilities ==
Pat Cullinan Community Facility is a multipurpose public events facilities.

== Religion ==
There is a catholic church, St. Bernadette’s which opened in 1964.

== Sports ==
North Motherwell football club is a local amateur team, part of the Central Scotland Football Association.
