= Wishaw =

Town in North Lanarkshire, Scotland

Coordinates: 55°46′27″N 03°55′06″W

Wishaw: Scots: Wishae/Wisha
- Town
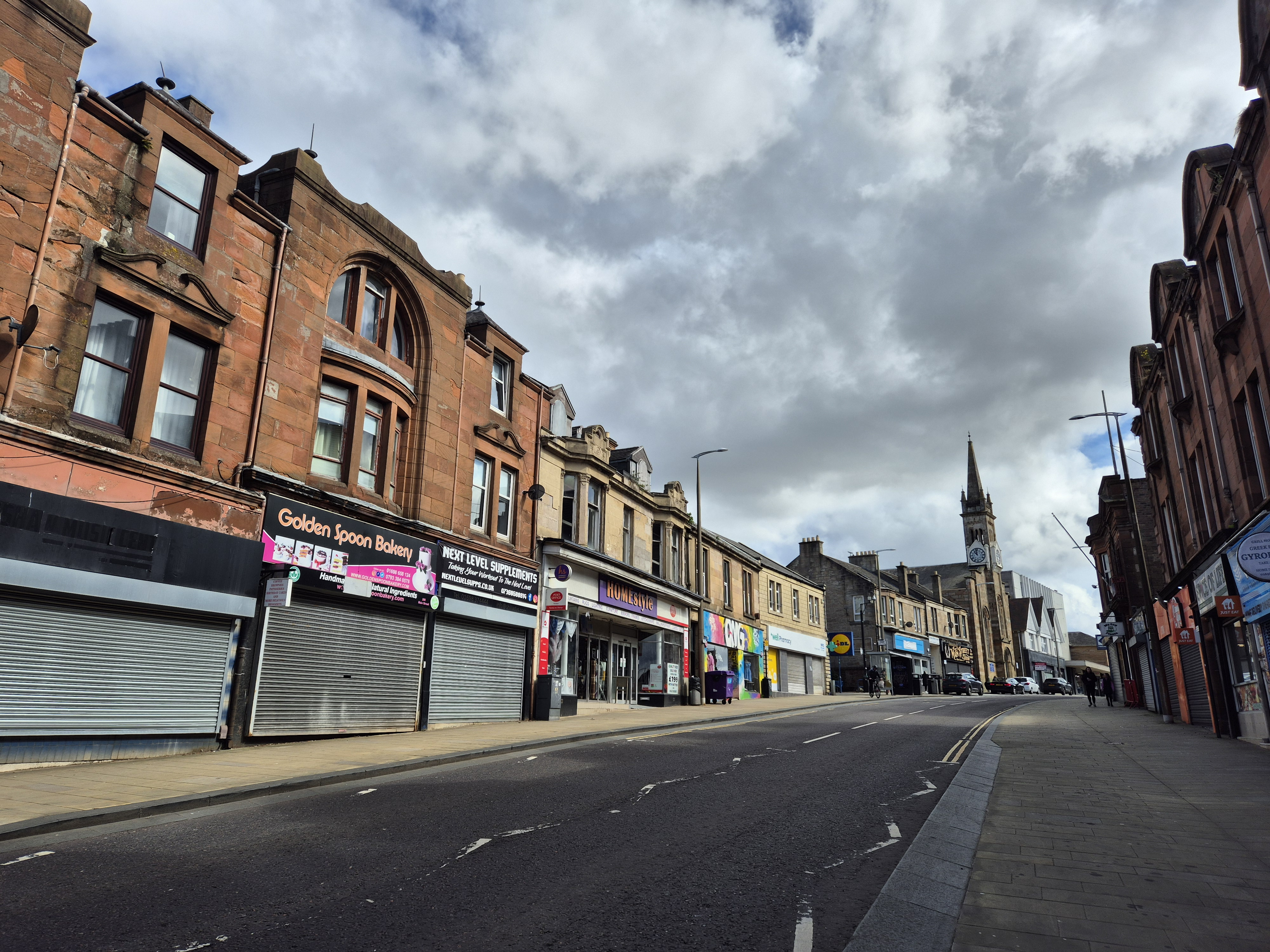
- Wishaw Main Street, 2025

- Location within North Lanarkshire
- Population: 30,050 (2020)
- OS grid reference: NS795555
  - Edinburgh: 31 mi (50 km)
- Council area: North Lanarkshire
- Lieutenancy area: Lanarkshire
- Country: Scotland
- Sovereign state: United Kingdom
- Post town: WISHAW
- Postcode district: ML2
- Dialling code: 01698
- Police: Scotland
- Fire: Scottish
- Ambulance: Scottish
- UK Parliament: Motherwell and Wishaw
- Scottish Parliament: Motherwell and Wishaw

Wishaw (/ˈwɪʃɔː/; Scots: Wishae or Wisha /ˈwɪʃi/) is a town in North Lanarkshire, Scotland; it is sited on the edge of the Clyde Valley, 15 miles (24 km) south-east of Glasgow city centre. The town forms part of the Motherwell and Wishaw parliamentary constituency.

The Burgh of Wishaw was formed in 1855 within Lanarkshire. The town developed extensively during the Victorian era, in particular during the Second Industrial Revolution. New industry and factories were established, including those in steel and iron production, as well as manufacturing, textiles and the processing of coal. The town's population increased as a result and new homes were built; Wishaw formed a joint large burgh with its neighbour Motherwell from 1920, until its dissolution when Scottish local authorities were restructured in 1975. It was then part the Motherwell district, within the Strathclyde region, until 1996. The town suffered during deindustrialisation, as businesses closed in the mid-to-late 20th century. In the 21st century, the town has a mixed economy with services industries and is a residential area within North Lanarkshire.

Cambusnethan, Coltness, Dimsdale, Greenhead, Pather, Waterloo and Wishawhill are considered as suburbs of Wishaw; Craigneuk and Netherton are too, though they are separated by the Argyle and West Coast railway lines. The "Wishaw area", however, is sometimes taken to mean the entire ML2 postcode area, which extends to the east and south and includes Morningside, Newmains and Overtown.

== Etymology ==
The name Wishaw is of Old English origin. The second element is scaga, meaning "wood", while the first element is either wiþig ("willow") or wiht ("bend").

== History ==
=== Ancient history ===
The area of what is now Wishaw once lay on important Roman roads that ran through the areas of the Clyde (Latin – Cluta) and South Calder Water. In fact, the current Main Street is based on a road built by the Romans. Another such road ran close to Wishaw House. In the 1960s, a pagan religious figurine was found in the woods near Netherton, showing that there was some form of settlement near Wishaw before the Christianisation of Scotland, which occurred between 400 and 600 AD.

=== Medieval era ===
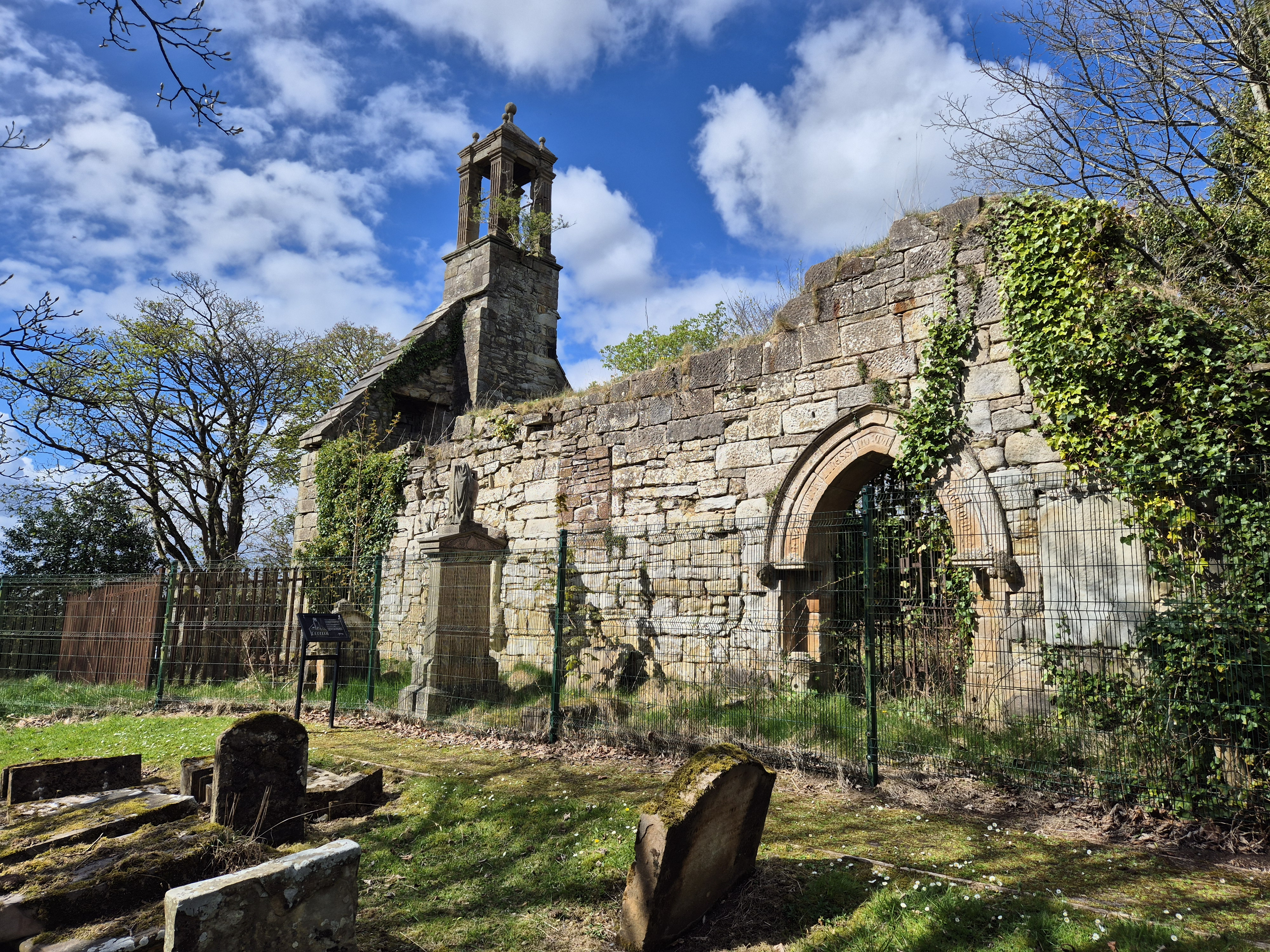
Cambusnethan church, dating to the 1600s

A small church was established by a bend (camas/cambo- in Cumbric) on the banks of the Clyde near what is now Netherton in the eighth century. There is however dispute to whether this was named after (or established by) Neithon of Alt Clut or perhaps St Ninian. Nonetheless, the area became known as Cambusnethan or Kamnethan from then on. The site of the original church remains as a ruined burial ground, including an impressive mausoleum to Lord Belhaven. The churchyard is notably round, similar to those found in Wales and Ireland, suggesting it could have been built on an earlier Celtic temple. Excavated from this area was the Cambusnethan Stone, a large Christian tablet created by the Strathclyde Britons.

In the 12th century, a Norman lord constructed a large manor near Gowkthrapple, as well as another small church. This was the beginning of the parish of Cambusnethan, which lasted up until 1930. In the 13th century, administrative control of the parish was ceded to Glasgow from the previous Kelso Abbey. Small fortresses and tower houses were built; after the Scottish Wars of Independence, the barony was transferred by Robert the Bruce to local lords, however the title lay abandoned by the 20th century. The Somervilles of Cambusnethan were the principal aristocrats in the area, but sold their land to Sir James Steuart, later Lord Provost of Edinburgh, in 1653. Wishaw House is thought to date back to the 15th century and appears on Pont's map of Scotland from 1583, as Wisha. The settlements of Greenhead, Camnethan, Peddyr and Overtoun of Camnethan also appear.

The ruined church on Kirk Road, mere yards away from the current Cambusnethan church, is thought to date back to the 1600s or earlier.

=== 18th to 20th century ===
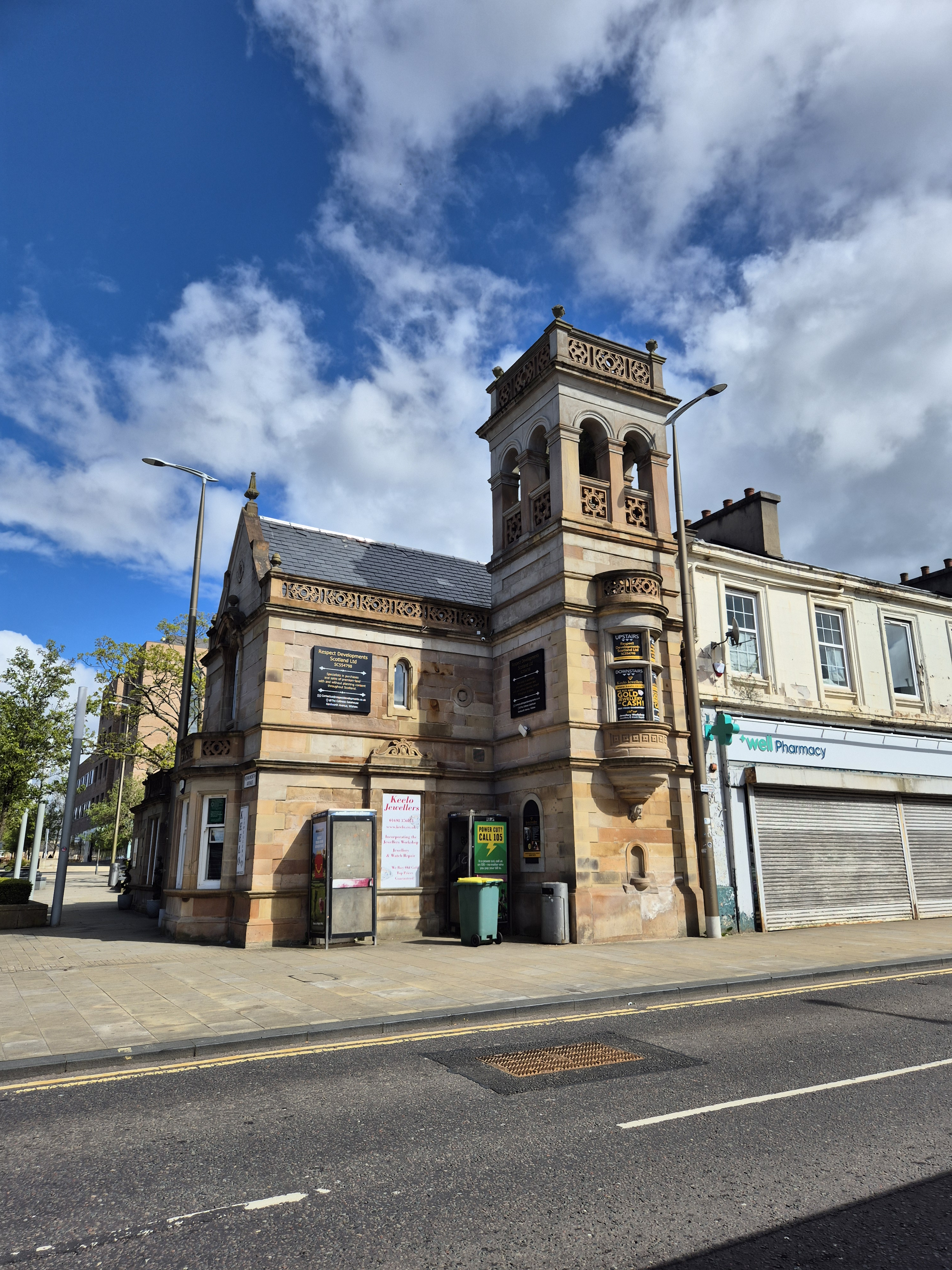
Former Coltness Gatehouse

In the 18th century, agriculture in the area consisted mainly of growing oats although some wheat and pear trees were cultivated. Members of the Reformed Presbyterian Church took up the favourable terms of the proprietor to enable them to establish a congregation in Wishaw in 1792. The village itself was laid out in 1794, named Cambusnethan and later renamed Wishawtown.

In 1801, the population of Wishaw was about 400 and that of the whole parish only 1,972. In the 1830s, Lord Belhaven set up a distillery in Wishaw. Other nineteenth century industries included coal mining, iron and steel making, foundry work, railway wagon building and fire-clay making.

Wishaw grew dramatically in the 1830s, with railways and gasworks coming to the town; many collieries opening during this decade. In 1840, the Old Parish Church was built. By the time the Caledonian Railway's main line came through Wishaw in 1848, it was a major mining centre fueling an important part of Scotland's industrial heartland. There were also factories for needle-work and tambouring, and confectionery. In 1848, Polish composer Frédéric Chopin visited Wishaw. Chopin was entertained at Wishaw house and played there for the family, the Hamiltons of Belhaven (the event has been commemorated by local residents in the past).

In the mid-19th century, the Coltness estate in the town was developed under ownership of the Houldsworths family, following the building of the Coltness Iron Company in 1837. The Jacobean style Coltness House was demolished in 1970, along with much of the historic estate, although the Category B-listed Gate House on Main Street and Kenilworth Avenue survives and was used as a public toilet until the early 21st century. On 4 September 1855, the town was incorporated with the villages of Coltness and Stewarton to form the Burgh of Wishaw, with a population of approximately 5,000. Four years later, in 1859, St.Ignatius Parish Church was established and the church built on Young Street, where it remains to this day. In 1882, Groome recorded that there were five schools in Wishaw, as well as others in nearby villages.

In 1905, the Category B-listed Clyde Chambers were built as tenement flats, shops and offices on Main Street. During the mid-20th century, Wishaw had five cinemas which have all since closed. These included the Classic Cinema at 57 Kirk Road which opened in 1920, closed in 1985 and was Category B-listed in 2001. The largest cinema in Wishaw was next door; the Greens Playhouse opened in 1940, with seating for 2,982 patrons. It closed in the 1970s, becoming a bingo club but then falling into disuse before being Category B-listed in 2004.

In the mid-to-late 20th century, deindustrialisation caused many factories and businesses to cease operation. The Coltness Iron company wound up in 1950. The local firm of R Y Pickering & Co Ltd (later Norbrit-Pickering) built railway rolling stock (especially wagons) and many tramcars for tram systems throughout the UK. One of its last orders was for ten double-decker trams for Aberdeen Corporation Tramways in 1949. Wishaw and its nearby neighbour of Motherwell were once the centre of steel manufacture in Scotland, as both towns were located either side of the former Ravenscraig Steelworks which closed in 1992.

In November 1996, the world's worst recorded outbreak of E. coli O157 occurred in the town, in which 21 people died and around 200 were infected.

=== 21st century ===
The town has partially recovered from the loss of industry, such as steelworks and coal mines which closed down in the 1980s and 1990s; unemployment remains though, as other factories including the Courtauld textile factory closed in 2000. At the 2014 Scottish independence referendum, Wishaw along with its neighbour Motherwell, voted 52% in favour of Scottish independence. Since 2015, Wishaw has voted for the Scottish National Party (SNP) at both general elections and local Scottish elections, replacing Labour as the dominant party of the town. Wishaw also has had a Scottish Conservative councillor since 2017. At the 2024 general election, Labour gained the Motherwell and Wishaw seat, after nine years of being held by the SNP.

North Lanarkshire Council identified that the majority of the biggest employers in the town are supermarkets; exceptions include Royal Mail, that has its main Scottish distribution centre at Shieldmuir, and the National Health Service, as a result of University Hospital Wishaw. There are many service industry businesses located in the town's industrial areas, though none with more than a few hundred employees.

==== Town centre ====
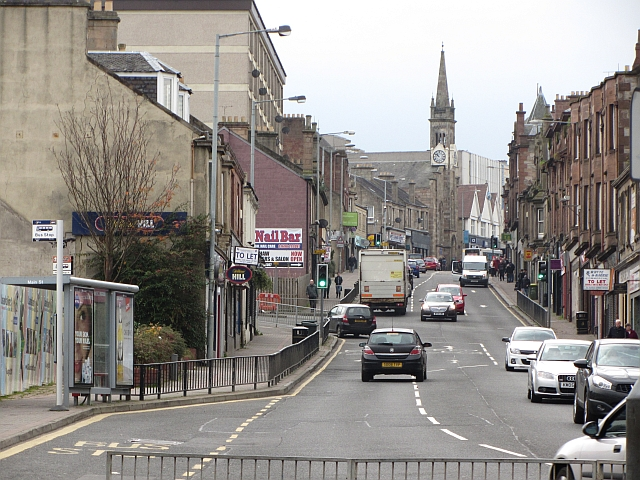
Wishaw Main Street in 2011

Main Street is the predominant shopping area in Wishaw, partly made up of major national stores and also features small independent retailers. The YMCA have a community centre in Wishaw, having moved to new premises from a purpose-built building that opened in 1915. The old YMCA building is Grade B-listed, but currently unused since becoming unsafe, although plans have been proposed for its restoration.

Wishaw also has the Caledonian Centre, a shopping complex in the northern suburb of Craigneuk, which consists of other national store chains.

The first stage of the modern town centre regeneration programme was completed in 2004, with a new car park being constructed between the local library and health centre. Some unused land between Station Road and Alexander Street (the railway station and sports centre) was converted into a park and ride facility, as part of this programme; this has led to a decrease in railway parking and traffic next to the station. The facility was later increased in size.

In late 2011, Kitchener Street was converted from a small neighbourhood to a main road, routing traffic away from the Main Street to Kenilworth Avenue, where a new roundabout was built. Lammermore Terrace, which was previously one-way, was converted into a two-way street. In 2014 work on a new modern housing estate called Ravenwood began on the site of the old Lammermoor Primary school, which was renamed Calderbridge and moved to a new building 600m away. The neighbourhood was finished in 2016 and now consists of around 50 houses.

== Geography and climate ==
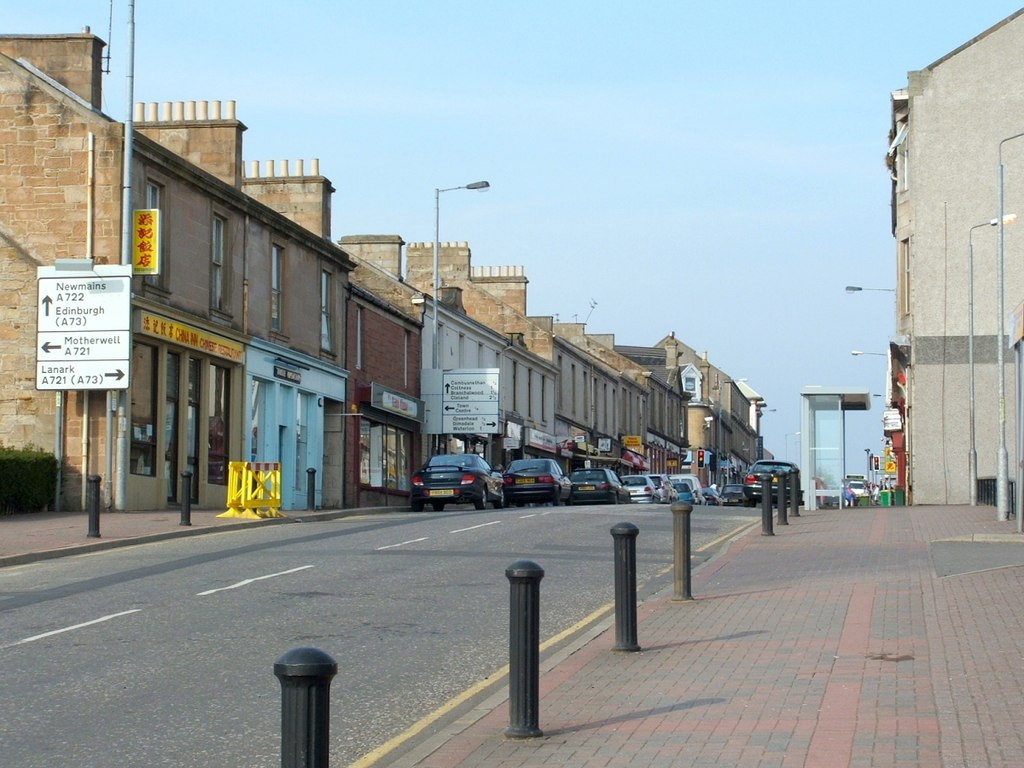
Caledonian Road

=== Locale ===
Wishaw lies within North Lanarkshire, the fourth largest local authority in Scotland by population. The town is located in the relatively level Central Belt area; while there are valleys and high moors, there are no hills or summits over 1,640 feet (500 m).

The defined locality of Wishaw (Note: Not including outlying localities Cleland, Gowkthrapple, Newmains and Overtown, which are each recorded separately.) had a population of 30,290 in 2016, the 26th largest such place in the country. Along with its neighbours of Hamilton, Bellshill and Motherwell, it had been considered to form part of the Greater Glasgow conurbation, which had a population of around 1,670,000 (around a third of Scotland's total) in 2019; however, since 2016, Wishaw, Motherwell and Bellshill have been officially considered separate from the Glasgow settlement due to small gaps in the chain of occupied postcodes used to determine a grouping; instead, they form their own settlement which has the fifth largest population in Scotland at 124,000.

=== Climate ===
Wishaw experiences mild summers and cool winters, with the most rainfall coming between October and March; most winters see around 10–20 days of snow. The warmest month on average is July, with an average daily temperature of 14.7 °C, while the coldest is January with an average daily temperature of 2.3 °C.

Wishaw lies on two rivers: the Clyde, running near to Overton and Netherton, and its tributary the South Calder Water further north near Coltness and Newmains.

== Public services ==
=== Education ===
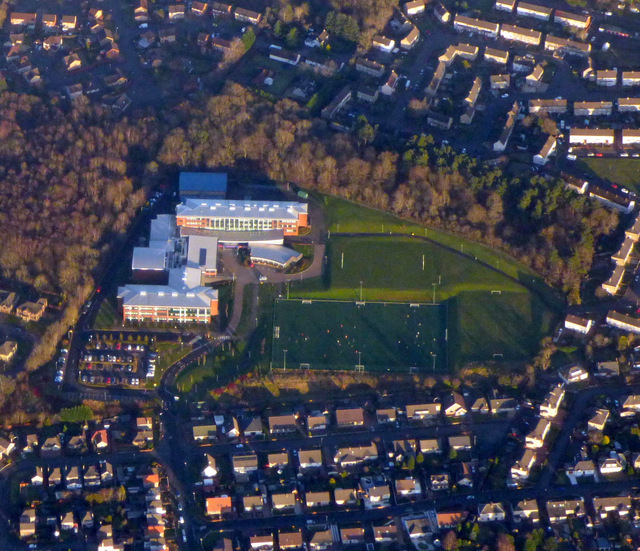
Coltness High School

There are three high schools in the area: Clyde Valley High School in Overtown, and Coltness High School and St Aidan's High School, both in Coltness. St. Aidan's High School serves not only Catholic pupils from Wishaw, but nearby towns such as Newmains, Shotts and Carluke. St. Aidan's has the highest number of pupils at around 1,100.

Primary schools in Wishaw include Calderbridge, St. Thomas', Thornlie, St. Aidan's, Cambusnethan, St. Ignatius' and Wishaw Academy (with both the latter two schools being a joint campus).

The nearest college is Motherwell College, based in Ravenscraig, and the University of the West of Scotland (formerly Bell College of Technology) in Hamilton is the nearest university.

=== Health ===
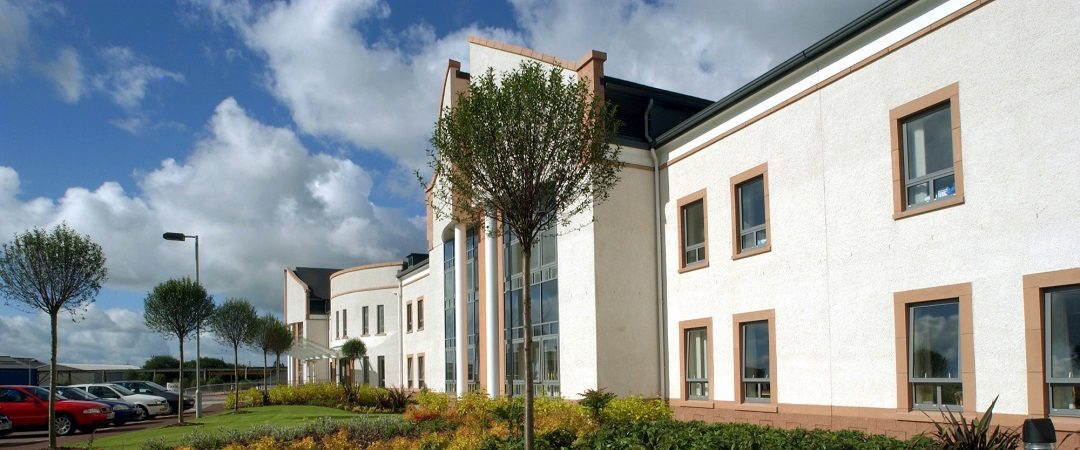
University Hospital

The town is served by University Hospital Wishaw, in the Craigneuk area. It was formerly known as Wishaw General Hospital and is still referred to as such by many local people today. It serves as an A&E to nearby settlements such as Motherwell, Newmains, Newhouse and Shotts. It is one of three acute hospitals in Lanarkshire, the others being Monklands Hospital in Airdrie and Hairmyres Hospital in East Kilbride.

The Houldsworth Centre, on the site of the old town library in Kenilworth Avenue, houses a café, public toilet, library and a health centre. The centre opened in April 2015, along with a multi-storey car park.

== Religion ==
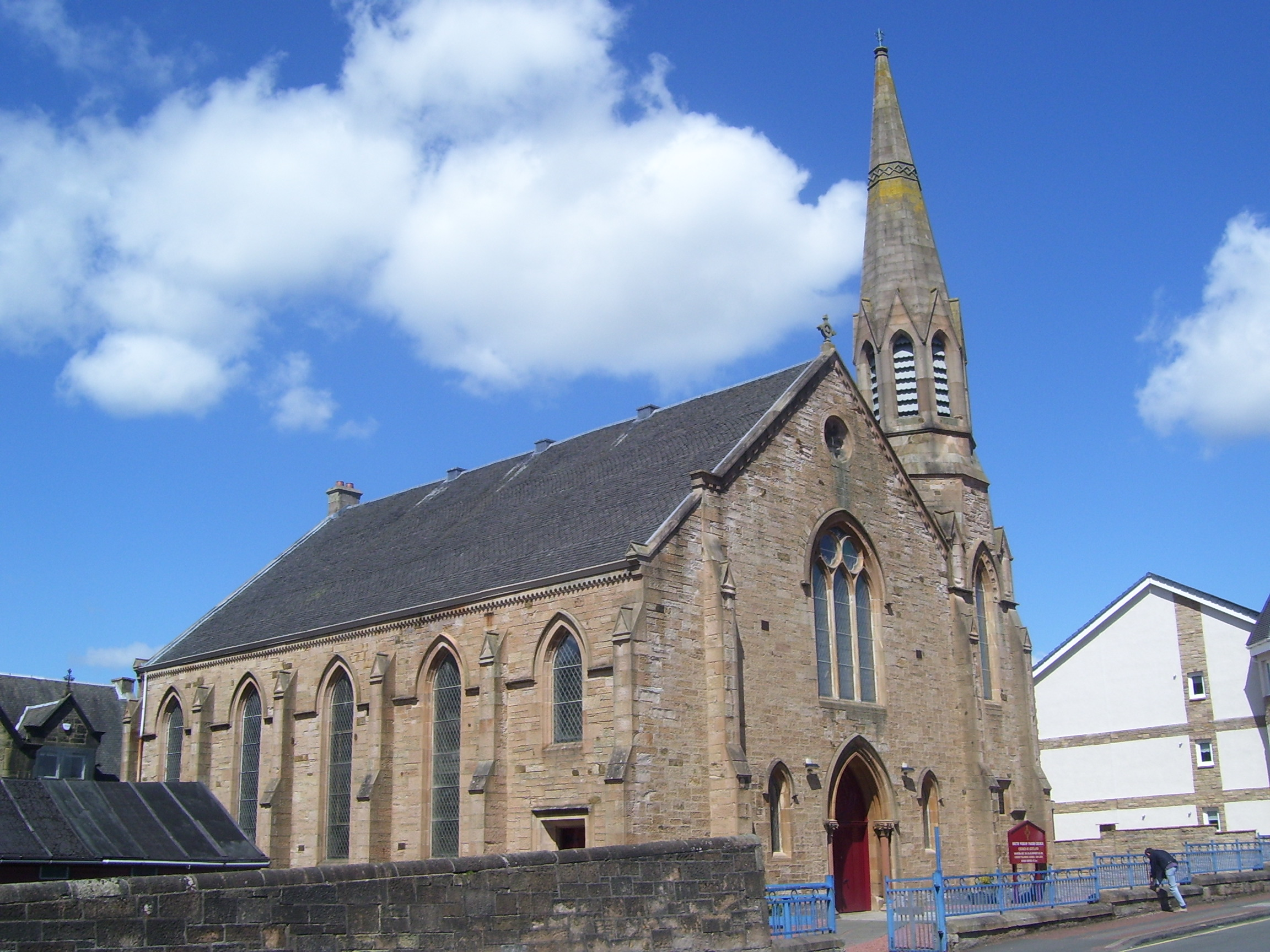
South Wishaw Parish Church, on East Academy Street

There are several Church of Scotland congregations. Serving principally the town centre are Wishaw Old Parish Church, the oldest building in Wishaw with the Town Clock in the steeple as the town's principal landmark, and South Wishaw Parish Church, on the outskirts of the town centre. The Old Parish Church was built 1840 in the Gothic Venetian style; however, declining attendance resulted in the church being closed at the end of 2024. Serving the outlying parts of Wishaw are – Cambusnethan North Parish Church, Cambusnethan Old and Morningside Parish Church, Craigneuk and Belhaven Church, Coltness Memorial Church (Newmains) and St. Mark's Church (Coltness). The Church of Scotland charges have been reduced in recent years through the union of Thornlie and Chalmers Churches to form South Wishaw Parish Church. The town also has a United Free Church, an Episcopal Church dedicated to St. Andrew, a Baptist church (both in Belhaven Terrace), a Gospel Hall (Ebenezer Gospel Hall), a Methodist church (now known as Netherton Methodist Church) and a Christian Outreach Centre.

There are five Roman Catholic churches: St. Ignatius of Loyola (Young Street), St. Aidan's (Coltness), St. Thomas' (Pather), St. Brigid's (Newmains) and St. Patrick's (Shieldmuir). St. Ignatius Church is the only Category A listed building in Wishaw Town Centre, as the Gothic Revival church was primarily designed by George Goldie, built in 1865. The town has a large Catholic population and strong Catholic links. These Catholics are mainly descended from the Irish Catholics who fled the Great Famine to settle in and around Glasgow, with many coming to Lanarkshire in particular. Today, the descendants of these immigrants constitute most of the Catholics in the town but there are also Catholics who are from other ethnicities, in particular those from the Italian and Polish communities in Scotland. Some Catholics are even ethnically Scottish.

== Governance ==
Wishaw is represented by several tiers of elected government:

- North Lanarkshire Council, the unitary local authority for Wishaw, is based at Motherwell and is the executive, deliberative and legislative body responsible for local governance
- The Scottish Parliament is responsible for devolved matters, such as education, health and justice;
- The Motherwell and Wishaw constituency is represented in the UK Parliament by Pamela Nash MP (Labour). The Parliament of the United Kingdom is responsible for reserved matters.
- In the Scottish Parliament, the constituency is represented by Clare Adamson (SNP). Wishaw is represented by seven regional MSPs from the Central Scotland electoral region.

== Transport ==
=== Railway ===
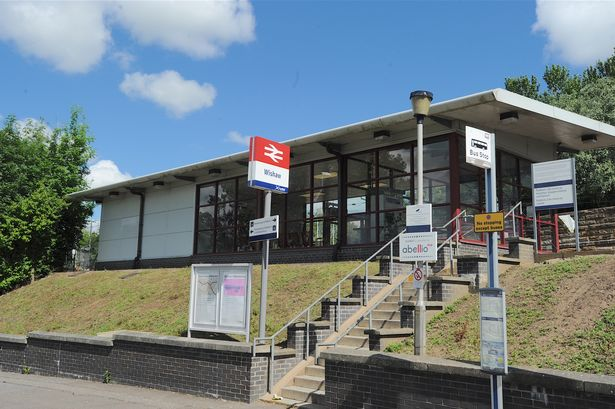
Wishaw railway station

Wishaw and Shieldmuir stations both serve the area on the Argyle Line. ScotRail operates regular services to Motherwell, Lanark and Glasgow Central. Wishaw station also hosts semi-fast services between Glasgow Central and Edinburgh Waverley.

Inter-city services on the West Coast Main Line pass through the town but do not stop there, as the main Wishaw South railway station on the line closed in 1958.

=== Roads ===
Wishaw is close to the A71 (Edinburgh, Livingston and Kilmarnock) road which links to the M74 motorway, as well as the A73 which links to the Borders regions and the M8.

Following a campaign by local politicians, the area is now well signposted from the nearby M8 and M74 motorways. This move was considered necessary as it is now the home to the main hospital for an area stretching right down the M74 corridor almost to the English border, approximately 75 miles (121 km) away.

=== Buses ===
The area is well served by bus routes. Services operated by First Greater Glasgow, JMB Travel and Stuart's Coaches connect the area with Airdrie, Glasgow, Lanark and Morningside.

=== Airport ===
The nearest airport to Wishaw is Glasgow Airport, 20 miles (32 km) away, although Edinburgh Airport is not much further at 26 miles (42 km). Connections to both airports are only via the cities they serve, as no direct public transport links from Wishaw are available.

== Sport and recreation ==
=== Facilities ===
Many of the town's residents are followers of Rangers, Celtic and neighbours Motherwell. There is a junior football team, Wishaw, which plays its home games at Beltane Park, near to the town's sports centre. There is also a large juvenile football club, Wishaw Wycombe Wanderers, who have many registered young players, playing football in age groups from Under 6s to Under 21s.

Wishaw has a King George's Field, in memorial to King George V, next to the town's hospital. This small park has two full-sized football pitches as well as a swing park and play area.

To the north-west of the town, there is a large golf course, the Wishaw Golf Club, founded in 1894; the course was designed in 1935 by James Braid.

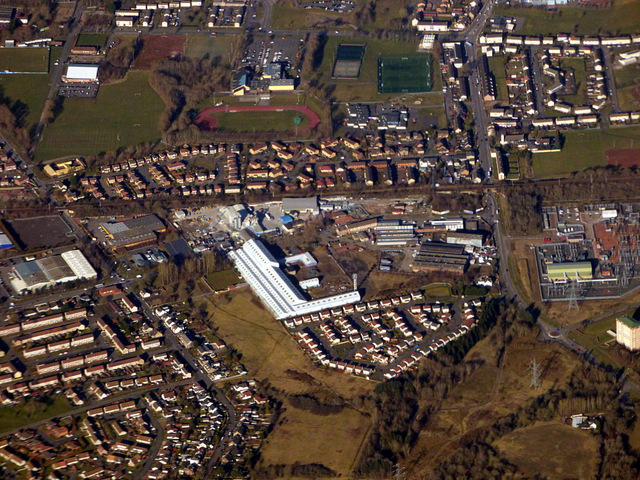
Wishaw Sports Centre from the air (top centre), during winter

The town's municipal sports centre also includes two small swimming pools, badminton and martial arts facilities and gymnastic equipment. A full-length running track is also on site along with a full-sized football pitch. Long jump pits and throwing cages are also issued within the track. There are also five-a-side astroturf pitches for football, where many local games are held. Elsewhere, all-weather pitches and a children's play area behind Morrisons have been closed for a new shared campus primary school by St. Ignatius Primary and Wishaw Academy Primary. The local council has made no announcement on whether these facilities will be replaced.

The town previously had a large swimming pool, complete with a large spectator grandstand, an underwater viewpoint and diving facilities. This was closed during the late 1990s to make way for a much smaller facility on the site of the town's sports centre. The reason given for this decision was the cost of maintaining such a facility for a town as small as Wishaw. Over the years, it had played host to many regional swimming events and also benefited from being within walking distance of the two main secondary schools in the area, as well as a host of primary schools.

University Hospital Wishaw also has a heated pool for specialist physiotherapy treatment.

=== Town park ===
Wishaw also has a town park named after Lord Belhaven, Belhaven Park. It has a swing park with climbing frames and slides. In March 2011, the park's play-area underwent a significant upgrade.

== Wishawhill ==
Wishawhill is a small neighbourhood village, located to the north of the town. The suburb can be entered by Heathery Road or Cleland Road, with both roads leading onto the A721 or Glasgow Road running towards Wishaw Main Street.

It is situated within walking distance from the major places in the town, such as the Main Street, the large Tesco Extra superstore and Wishaw General Hospital. There is also the large golf course located to the north of the area. Virtually all of Wishawhill is low density residential housing and flats, with only a community centre and the ex-servicemen's club being the non-residential buildings in the area. Due to its close proximity with Wishaw Main Street, there is only one local newsagent shop. The suburb also has a swing park and a football pitch.

The area used to be host to one Roman Catholic Primary School, St Matthew's, located on Pentland Road, until it was closed in June 2010. This happened despite a large campaign by local residents to keep the school open. It is now being demolished due to repeated vandalism. St Thomas's in Pather is now the nearest Roman Catholic school.

== Notable people ==
People from Wishaw include:

- The Alexander Brothers, musicians and entertainers
- Joe Baker, footballer
- Andrew Barrowman, footballer
- John Cleland, motor racing champion
- Enrico Cocozza, underground filmmaker
- Colin Cramb, footballer
- Sir Samuel Curran, physicist, inventor of the scintillation counter and founder of Strathclyde University
- Alan Fisher, journalist
- Tommy Gemmell, footballer
- Jim Graham, Washington D.C. politician
- Roy Henderson, footballer
- John Higgins, world snooker champion
- Paul Higgins, actor and writer
- Derek Holmes, footballer
- The Jolt, 1970s pop group
- Lewis Macleod, footballer
- John Gibson Lockhart, biographer and novelist
- Stan McEwan, footballer
- Marie McLaughlin, opera singer
- Lee Miller, footballer
- Michael Moore, politician
- Deborah Orr, journalist and columnist
- Thomas Canfield Pomphrey, architect, was born here in 1881.
- Paul Quinn, footballer
- Charles Reid (photographer) Victorian Photographer
- Gordon Reid, actor
- Anne Sharp, opera singer
- Saint Phnx, musical group
- Bill Scott, rugby player
- Kieran Tierney, footballer for Arsenal and the Scotland national team
- Alison Turriff, musician
- Frank S. Walsh, scientist
- Alex Wilson, footballer
- Thomas Winning, archbishop and cardinal.
