= Pather =

Coordinates: 55.7683°N 3.9257°W

- Location within North Lanarkshire
- OS grid reference: NS792546
- Council area: North Lanarkshire
- Lieutenancy area: Lanarkshire
- Country: Scotland
- Sovereign state: United Kingdom
- Post town: WISHAW
- Postcode district: ML2
- Dialling code: 01698
- Police: Scotland
- Fire: Scottish
- Ambulance: Scottish
- UK Parliament: Motherwell and Wishaw
- Scottish Parliament: Motherwell and Wishaw

Pather is a suburb of Wishaw, Scotland and was initially built as a council estate. It is situated around ½ miles (0.8 km) from the town centre.

Pather can be entered by vehicle from Caledonian Road into either Lomond Drive or Tarbert Avenue. Pedestrian access is also available from Dimsdale at the top of the estate and from Thornlie Gill onto Lomond Drive as well as at The Tunnel area on Caladonian Road. Back road walks to and from Overtown and Gowkthrapple are also available.

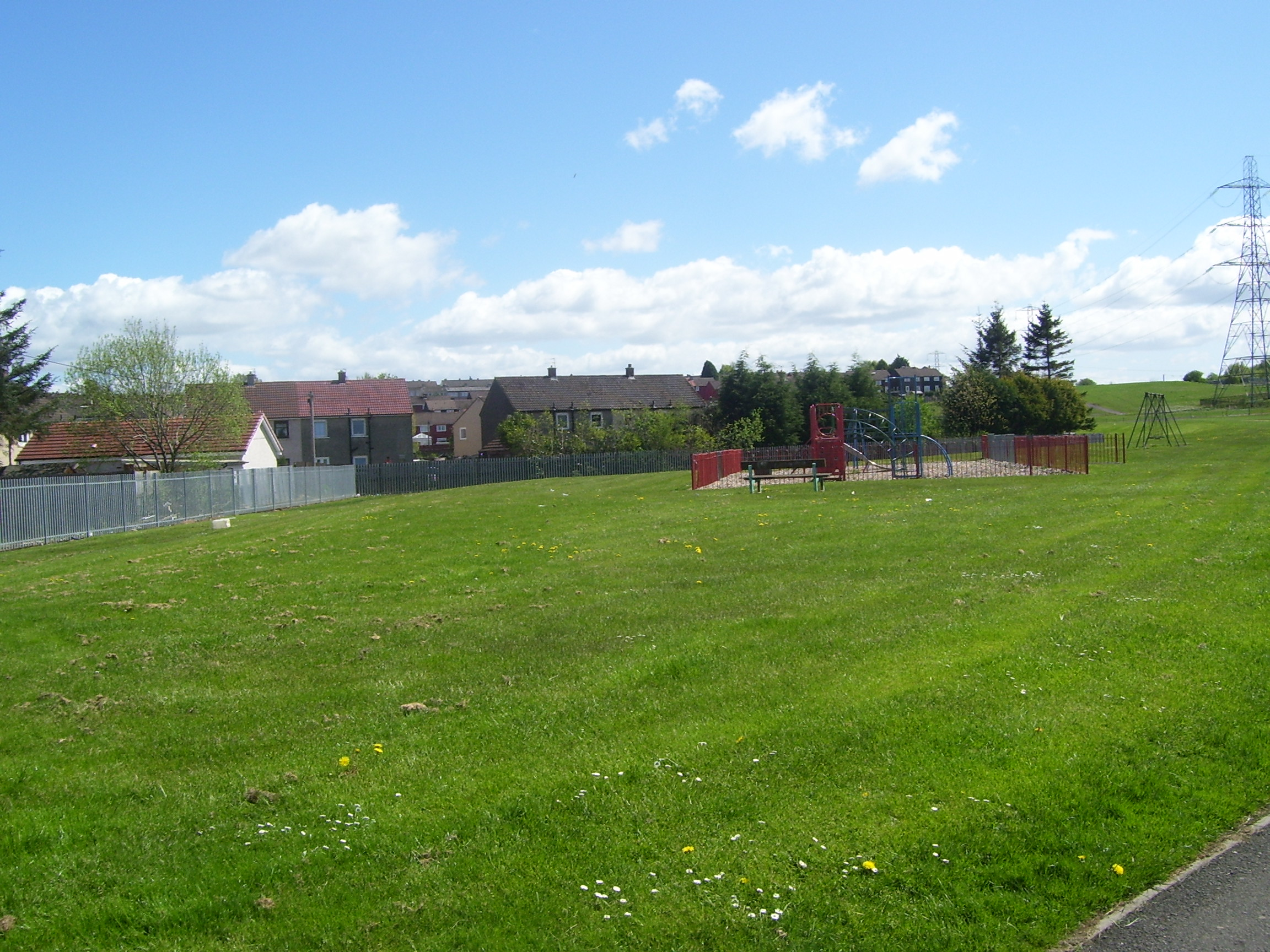
Pather Park

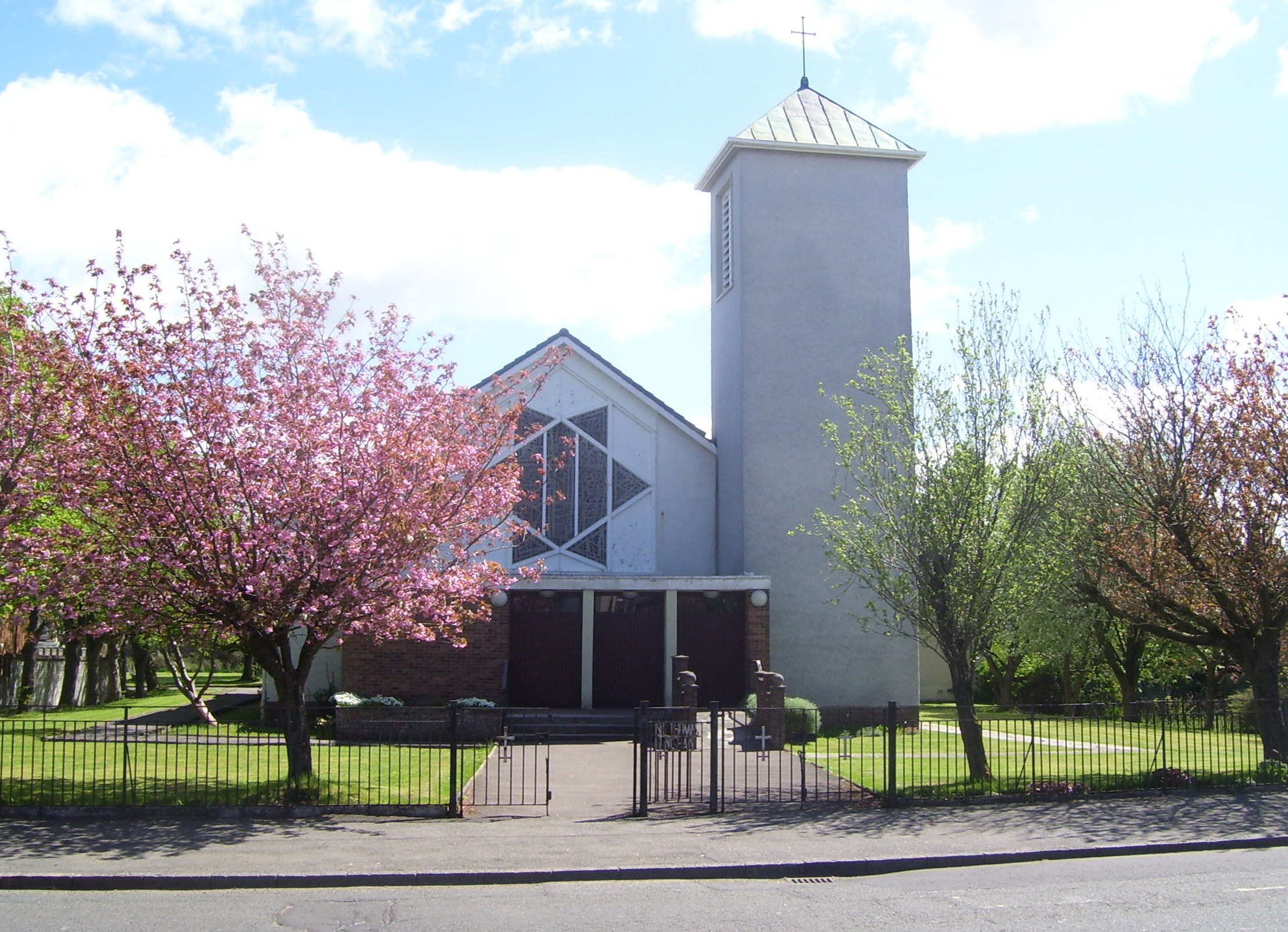
St Thomas' Church

== Street names ==
All the streets in Pather are named after Scottish Lochs except Hospital Road, which is an offshoot of the road that used to pass the now demolished Wishaw Hospital. Examples of this include Tarbert Avenue, Lomond Drive, Earn Crescent, Ness Street, Etive Street, and Sunart Street.

== Education ==
There is a non-denominational primary school within the estate Thornlie Primary. The majority of the children from the area attend this school or the Roman Catholic Primary School, Saint Thomas' Primary which is located directly in front of Pather on Caladonian Road.

== Shops, services and facilities ==
Shops in Pather include a post office, PremierStore convenience store and a hairdressers/barber shop on Rannoch Drive. There is also a convenience shop located at the top end of the estate. There is also a small arcade of shops on Caledonian Road at the entrance to Lomond Drive, Braw Dogs grooming, Sewing Workshop, Shopsmart convenience store and atm, June's Bridal wear and Kilt hire, also a Daytoday convenience store further along next to St Thomas'.

In the park adjacent to Thornlie Primary School there is now a large play and recreation area, funded by various groups and organised by Pather Action Group, a local community organisation, it is open to all residents of the area.

Pather is only a short walk into the town centre and main shopping area of Wishaw. Pather is also only a few minutes away from Wishaw Sports Centre and Wishaw Train Station as well as Tesco extra supermarket and McDonald's and other fast food establishments and petrol filling stations and the local recycling centre is not far.

Pather Park is a very good dog walking area with dog waste bins provided, there are 3 football pitches and a changing Pavilion, the Park stretches from Caledonian Road to the "Old Roads" area at the now gone Pather Farm - the complete length of the estate. There is also a BMX bike park at the top end.

Pather Community Centre is located at the bottom of the estate and holds various activities and another good dog walking area is available to the rear.

== Transport ==
Pather is separated from the main part of Wishaw and Gowkthrapple by the two railway lines, one of which is the main West Coast line between Glasgow and London and the other is the Lanark Line which runs between Lanark and Glasgow Central High Level, which run parallel along the length of the scheme proper. It is served by First Glasgow service 242, Monday to Saturday Daytime to Holytown/Maxim Park (Mon-Fri early and late peak buses extend from Holytown to Maxim Park). Monday to Saturday evening bus services are provided by Stuarts Coaches who run service 248 between Wishaw Hospital & Holytown, via Pather, Wishaw Coltness, Cleland, Newarthill, & New Stevenston. Sunday only bus service 193 is provided by First Glasgow and runs between Pather and Cleland via Netherton, Wishaw Hosp, Wishaw, & Coltness. Pather can be entered by Tarbert or Lomond Drive by Caledonian Road (B754)

== Religion ==
Pather residents have a mix of religious and spiritual beliefs and practices. Various places of worship are available.
