= Cambusnethan =

Coordinates: 55.779°N 3.898°W

Cambusnethan: Scottish Gaelic: Camus Neachdainn
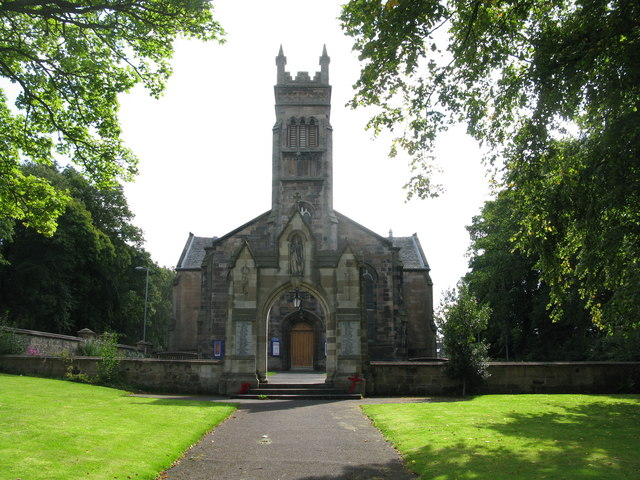
- Cambusnethan Parish Church

- Location within North Lanarkshire
- OS grid reference: NS812556
- Council area: North Lanarkshire
- Lieutenancy area: Lanarkshire
- Country: Scotland
- Sovereign state: United Kingdom
- Post town: Wishaw
- Postcode district: ML2
- Dialling code: 01698
- Police: Scotland
- Fire: Scottish
- Ambulance: Scottish
- UK Parliament: Motherwell and Wishaw
- Scottish Parliament: Motherwell and Wishaw

Cambusnethan is a historic parish in North Lanarkshire in Scotland. The largest settlement in the parish is Wishaw, and Cambusnethan now appears on maps as a village almost contiguous with Wishaw. The village is approximately 1.5 miles (2.4 km) long, straddling both sides of the A722 road on a hill overlooking Wishaw.

== Etymology ==
The name "Cambusnethan" was historically recorded as Kamnethan and in earlier sources, as Kamysnethyn. The establishment of an early medieval church of the same name suggests that the name is Celtic in origin. The "Cambus" part of the name would come from "caman/camas/camn" a word that could be either Gaelic or Cumbric and means a bend or meander. "Nethan" is harder to pinpoint. It could come from a corruption of Ninian, who travelled through southern Scotland, it could also be said to come from Nechtan, the name of both a Pictish king and a mythological Celtic figure. Or possibly, Neithon of Alt Clut, a king of Strathclyde, the kingdom that held the land for centuries.

Thus the name likely means "bend of Nethan".

== History ==
Originally, the name Cambusnethan or Camnethan referred to the whole Wishaw area, and a portion of the Scottish county of Lanarkshire. The Parish of Cam(bus)nethan, as it was known was established in the 11th century, with the parish church standing on the banks of the River Clyde, in the countryside near the modern neighbourhoods of Netherton and Gowkthrapple. The parish would have remained a rural, lowly populated area until the 1600s at least.

The modern settlement began some time after the Middle Ages (exact time period unknown), but remained a small hamlet. It grew massively alongside its neighbour, Wishaw, during the Industrial Revolution, with industries such as railways, textiles, quarrying and in particular, coal mining. This established Cambusnethan's importance to the Scottish economy. Nevertheless, by the time of the first edition Ordnance Survey six inch, surveyed 1859, the area still looked like a rural area with patches of industrial development. A great change is then evident by the time of Lanarkshire Sheet XVIII.NE, revised 1896, with Wishaw and Coltness particularly heavily developed. Eventually, both Wishaw and Cambusnethan grew so large that the boundaries between the towns faded and both settlements became one large urban area.

Throughout the 20th century, many housing estates were built in Cambusnethan, further expanding it.

Today, Cambusnethan is much integrated with Wishaw to the point where it is mostly considered to be an area of the town rather than a town in its own right.

== Transport ==
Cambusnethan is served by First service 266 every 10-15 minutes from Glasgow's Buchanan bus station. It also has a separate hourly express bus services to Glasgow in the form of the First service X11. An infrequent local bus service to Livingston, West Lothian also serves the area.

There are the remnants of a railway line running through the area. This has been disconnected for almost 80 years with most of the track and bridges now gone, though some elements of the line still exist behind the telephone exchange and the social club. The section between the Miner's Club and the Hot Water pond (Perchy Pond) was used as a dump in the 70s/80s, and is thus mostly filled in now. People to this day still fly tip there despite the excellent new council refuse facility in Netherton.

== Local facilities ==
Cambusnethan has two Church of Scotland Presbyterian churches: Cambusnethan North Parish Church, at the top of Kirk Road, and Cambusnethan Old and Morningside Parish Church, further down the hill. Cambusnethan Primary School is non-denominational and previously sat between the two churches on the other side of the road. Plans for a new, updated primary school have been confirmed, and in Summer 2006 construction work began at the top of Branchal Road, with the clearing of the local park and some of the woods surrounding the area. The new school was completed in Summer 2007, and the original building has been demolished.

The local sub-post office, which sits at the entrance to the Memorial Park (East Gate) but now is shut down for good. The nearest post offices is located in Newmains or Wishaw which both are beside Cambusnethan.

Following the demise of the New Day there are currently two pubs: The Horse and Anchor and The Auld Hoose. There are two convenience stores in the area, Bobbys and Northmuir licensed grocer's shop. An Indian takeaway, the Tandoori Mahal, has traded in the last few years in the shop adjacent to Bobbys.

Cambusnethan also provides the area code (01698 38xxxx) for most of eastern Wishaw via the large BT telephone exchange.

Another very popular meeting place is the Cambusnethan Miners' Club at the foot of Woodhall Road, also known as the red road.

The site of the old Cambusnethan Primary School has become housing. The new Primary School is situated on Branchal Road

== Boys' Brigade ==
Cambusnethan has two active BB companies.

== Local landmarks ==
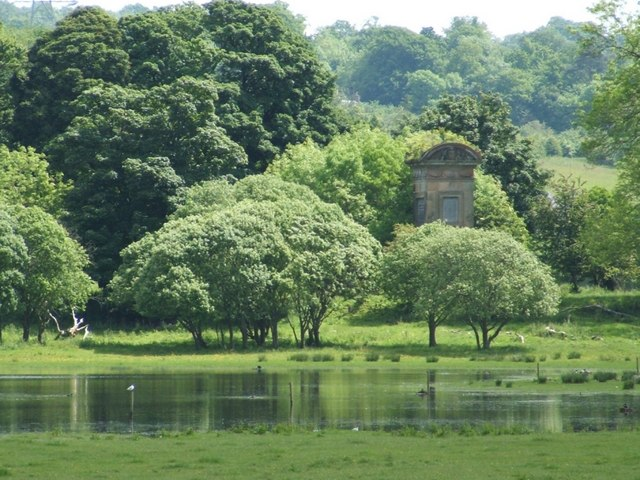
The Belhaven and Stenton Mausoleum stands in the old cemetery which was associated with the ancient parish church of Cambusnethan, founded in the eighth century.

A well-known local landmark is '"The Bing", well known for children to slide down it in a wheely bin or a bread crate, a large loose stone hill formed by extensive mining operations, which were active in the area until the 1960s. Cambusnethan was a major coal mining centre at the start of the 20th century and, when it was all finished, the shafts were closed and the spoil heaps landscaped to create The Bing.

Cambusnethan House or Priory is a few miles west of the area and is a stunning Gothic house by Scottish architect James Gillespie Graham. It was so named because, before Wishaw existed, Cambusnethan was the name of the whole burgh stretching from Newmains to the River Clyde. Today the main town sits between Cambusnethan and the River Clyde.

== Notable residents ==
- Alex Duthart (7 October 1925 – 27 November 1986) was a Scottish drummer who revolutionised Scottish pipe band drumming.
- Dame Dr. Ruth Silver, DBE is the Principal of Lewisham College and an adviser to the Select Committee in the House of Commons and a member of the Skills Commission.
- Pte William Johnstone Milne. Born 21 December 1891. Killed in Action at Thelus, France, 9 April 1917 serving in the 16th Battalion, Manitoba (Canadian Scottish) Regiment. Posthumous recipient of the Victoria Cross.
- Sir James Denham-Steuart, 7th Baronet of Coltness, an early economist whose Inquiry into the Principles of Political Oeconomy predates Adam Smith's An Inquiry into the Nature and Causes of the Wealth of Nations by nine years, is buried in the family vault at old Cambusnethan church (now a ruin).
- Tom and Jack Alexander. The Scottish music singing duo known as the Alexander Brothers.

== See also ==
- Murder of Zoe Nelson
