= Netherton, North Lanarkshire =

Coordinates: 55.768849°N 3.947568°W

Netherton
- Location within North Lanarkshire
- Council area: North Lanarkshire
- Lieutenancy area: Lanarkshire
- Country: Scotland
- Sovereign state: United Kingdom
- Post town: WISHAW
- Postcode district: ML2
- Dialling code: 01698
- Police: Scotland
- Fire: Scottish
- Ambulance: Scottish
- UK Parliament: Motherwell and Wishaw
- Scottish Parliament: Motherwell and Wishaw Central Scotland

Netherton is a southerly suburb of Wishaw, which can be entered from Netherton Road, which runs easterly from Pickering's Corner to the Cherry Tree public house, spanning the full length of the suburb. Alternatively, Netherton can also be entered from Netherton Street, which runs from the Heathery roundabout to Netherton Cross. Netherton is bordered by Gowkthrapple, Craigneuk, Muirhouse and the River Clyde.

== History ==
Due to its position close to the Clyde, Netherton has been the part of Wishaw with the most historical background. The relatively fertile plains have been used for farming and settlement for millennia. An archaeological find in the 1960s showed of a figurehead dedicated to a Celtic god, showing that Netherton had some form of pre Christian settlement. The old Cambusnethan Parish church was built here in the Early Middle Ages, possibly as far back as the 8th century. The round nature of the kirkyard suggests it was built on the site of an earlier pagan temple, which would signify that there indeed was a Celtic village here.

In 1859, a branch of the Glasgow Iron & Steel works was opened in Netherton as Lanarkshire was becoming a stronghold of the iron and steel industry. The industry continued in Netherton until the mid-1980s, when the Clyde Alloy works was shut. Many Netherton men also worked in the steelworks nearby, such as Ravenscraig, Dalzell and the Lanarkshire Steelworks.

Other major businesses of the past in Netherton include R Y Pickering, manufacturer of railway wagons and rolling stock, and A G Barr, bottling plant of the soft drink maker.

Netherton also had a police station and a cooperative society, both now closed.

== Transport ==
Netherton is served by a range of buses provided by First Glasgow and JMB Travel which provide services to Wishaw, Motherwell, Hamilton and Glasgow amongst other places.

There is no longer a train station in Netherton since the closure of Wishaw South station in 1958. Rail services to Lanark and Glasgow are provided from nearby Shieldmuir station.

== Entertainment and Facilities ==
Netherton has a small shopping centre on the corner of Netherton Road and Carbarns Road consisting of a general grocer/post office, a hairdressing salon, sit-in cafe and a selection of fast food takeaways. Near the bottom of Netherton Road is the Cherry Tree pub.

There is a non-denominational primary school in Netherton Road, Netherton Primary School. Further along Netherton Road, at Netherton Cross is a fairly new community centre, which has replaced the dilapidated Netherdale Hall.

A football club for teams of under-8s, 10s and 12s, Netherton Football Club, was established for over five years. The club no longer exists. The nearest professional football club is Motherwell, with the club's stadium Fir Park located only 2 miles away to the North-West of the suburb.

Netherton also has a methodist church, Netherton Methodist church, formerly Castlehill Methodist, which was opened in 1976 and swiftly established 1st Netherton Boys' Brigade.

The population of Netherton has increased greatly in recent years, which has necessitated the building of large new housing estates on the site of Wards scrapyard, at Netherton Street between Wishaw General Hospital and the gastank and next to Netherton Industrial Estate, amongst others.

== Industrial Estate ==
There is a large industrial estate on the westerly side of Netherton Road. It has been expanded in recent years and businesses include the Royal Mail sorting office, the NHS laundry and Daiwa, as well as a major new household waste recycling centre.
