= Waterloo, North Lanarkshire =

Coordinates: 55.75°N 03.91°W

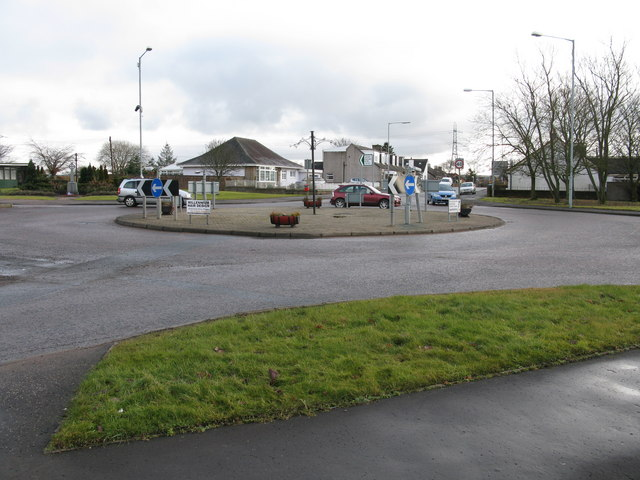
Roundabout found in the suburb of Waterloo

Waterloo is a small suburb in Wishaw, North Lanarkshire, Scotland. It is located on the A71 Edinburgh-Irvine road. Originally a village in its own right, it is now considered to be a suburb of Wishaw.

It does not have many local services of note, however, it is home to the Indian Restaurant, The Pink Turban.

== Location ==
The Ordnance Survey grid reference is NS8053.
