= Overtown, North Lanarkshire =

Coordinates: 55.755°N 3.911°W

Overtown: Scottish Gaelic: Baile Uachdar; Scots: Overtoun
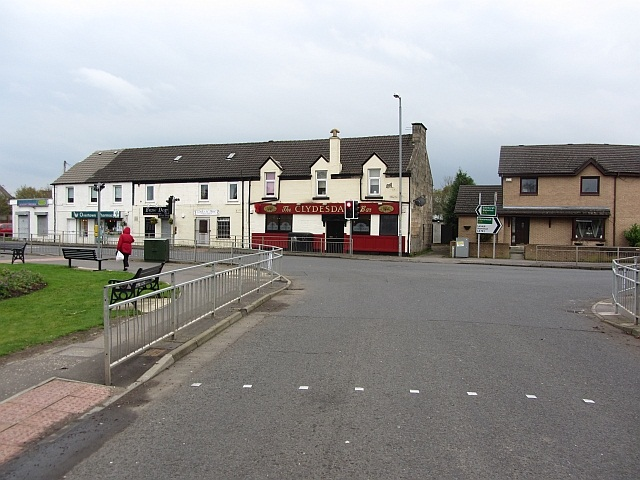
- Overtown Main Street

- Location within North Lanarkshire
- Population: 1,910 (2020)
- OS grid reference: NS801528
- Council area: North Lanarkshire
- Lieutenancy area: Lanarkshire
- Country: Scotland
- Sovereign state: United Kingdom
- Post town: WISHAW
- Postcode district: ML2
- Dialling code: 01698
- Police: Scotland
- Fire: Scottish
- Ambulance: Scottish
- UK Parliament: Motherwell and Wishaw
- Scottish Parliament: Motherwell and Wishaw

Overtown is a village in North Lanarkshire, Scotland. It is located to the east of the River Clyde, about one mile (1.5 kilometres) south of Wishaw. Originally developed as a mining village in the 19th century, its population declined after the closure of the coal mines and the associated railways in the 1950s.

The village only has a few buildings of note, Clyde Valley High School, located to the North-West, and Overtown Primary School which was closed in 2016. Overtown also has a community centre, a parish Church which serves as a focal point for the community and a small number of independent shops and takeaway restaurants. A "First Glasgow" (the former "Hutchison") bus depot is located in the village.

The A71 road, that links Edinburgh with Ayrshire, passes through Overtown. The road is the main street of the village. It is located on the edge of the Clyde Valley, and is only one mile (1.5 kilometres) away from Garrion Bridge. The West Coast Main Line also passes through the village, but no passenger service trains stop there.
