= Gowkthrapple =

Coordinates: 55.7609772°N 3.9292645°W

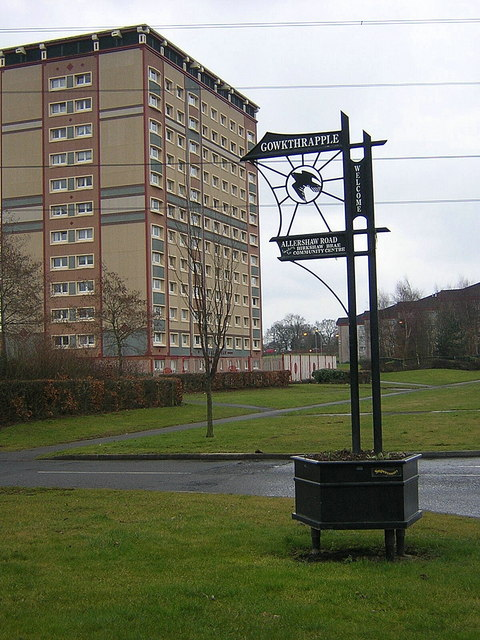
- Gowkthrapple tower block and distinctive street sign

- Location within North Lanarkshire
- Area: 0.326 km^{2} (0.126 sq mi)
- Population: 1,040 (2020)
  - Density: 3,190/km^{2} (8,300/sq mi)
- OS grid reference: NS790536
- Council area: North Lanarkshire
- Lieutenancy area: Lanarkshire
- Country: Scotland
- Sovereign state: United Kingdom
- Post town: WISHAW
- Postcode district: ML2
- Dialling code: 01698
- Police: Scotland
- Fire: Scottish
- Ambulance: Scottish
- UK Parliament: Motherwell and Wishaw
- Scottish Parliament: Motherwell and Wishaw

Gowkthrapple is a small neighbourhood of Wishaw, Scotland, situated around 3/4 miles (1.2 km) from the town centre. The name "Gowkthrapple" is a Scots compound word made up of "gowk", meaning "idiot" or "cuckoo" and "thrapple", meaning "throat" or "strangle". One theory of how the community gained its name is that there was a woodland here which was notable for cuckoos. Gowkthrapple can be entered off of Castlehill Road which runs the length of the estate. Formerly an industrial area, associated with the Pather Iron and Steel Works and then Smith's clock factory, which opened in 1951. This closed in the 1970s, although the premises remain standing on Smith Avenue and have been reused as Garrion Business Park. In mid 2020, Gowkthrapple had an estimated population of 1,040.

== Structures ==
Gowkthrapple's housing predominantly consisted of tower blocks and smaller tenements in a similar design. The largest of these towers were built in the 1970s and were up to 13 floors high, whereas several smaller blocks had four floors. In the first decade of the 21st century, some of the larger buildings were demolished as part of a re-development of the area. There are only two remaining tower blocks in the neighbourhood: Allershaw and Birkshaw Towers, each 12 floors high and refurbished (Allershaw Tower is home to the (housing association).

The decline of industry in the region and its physical isolation from the rest of Wishaw led to economic and social problems in the area, with the estate gaining a reputation locally for a high crime rate. Falling rates of occupancy among natives led to a wave of migrants from Eastern Europe, mainly Poland, moving to Gowkthrapple in the 21st century. Projects have been undertaken to encourage integration between the different groups in the community and improve security and safety for residents.

Within the estate there was a small convenience store (which is now closed) and also a community centre. There are also several children's play areas within the scheme.

In 2017, it was reported that North Lanarkshire Council planned to demolish all the towers in its control over the next 20 years (as well as the low-rise apartments in Gowkthrapple) and replace them with modern housing, due to the rising costs of maintenance as the buildings aged, as well as some of the flats being unpopular and underoccupied. By the end of 2022, all but one of the residents (and one of only three owner-occupiers across 400 properties) from the tenements and towers had moved elsewhere in preparation for demolition.

== Education ==
Castlehill Primary School was formerly located in Birkshaw Brae and has since demolished and moved to a new campus in the nearby village of Overtown. The area is serviced by the non-denominational secondary school Clyde Valley High School, based in Overtown a quarter-mile (0.5 km) to the southeast, and St Aidan's High School, a catholic secondary school based in the main part of Wishaw.
