= List of Peckett and Sons railway locomotives =

List of Peckett and Sons railway locomotives, plus those from Fox Walker, both built at the Atlas Engine Works, Bristol.

Despite heavy work and poor maintenance, the engines were long-lasting, and many Peckett locomotives were preserved as working engines on heritage railways. The oldest surviving Fox Walker locomotive is Karlskoga, an 0-6-0ST of 1873 which was returned to steam at Nora, Sweden in 1982.

List of Fox, Walker & Company and Peckett & Sons locomotives
Works No.	Name	Built	Type	Formation	Gauge	Status	Location	Image	Notes
Fox, Walker and Company (1864–1880)
		1868		4-4-0		Scrapped			Built for the Windsor and Annapolis Railway, Canada
154	Karlskoga	1873		0-6-0ST	4 ft 8 1/2 in (1,435 mm)	Preserved	Nora, Sweden		Oldest surviving Fox Walker locomotive. First locomotive of Nora Bergslags Railway. Steamed in 1982.
180	Bristol	1873		0-6-0ST		Scrapped			Built for the Port of Bristol Authority. Worked at Avonmouth Docks.
216		1874		0-4-0T	4 ft 8 1/2 in (1,435 mm)	Scrapped			One of a batch of three "J" class well tanks built for the Nunnery Colliery. Loaned to the Lidgett Colliery in 1890
217	Cordoba	1874		2-4-0	4 ft 8 1/2 in (1,435 mm)	Scrapped	1895		Cordoba and Tucuman Railway
223	Avellaneda			0-4-2	1,000 mm (3 ft 3 3/8 in)	Scrapped	Late 1920s		Cordoba and Tucuman Railway No. 7 "Avellaneda"
230–238				0‑6‑0	1,000 mm (3 ft 3 3/8 in)	Scrapped	Late 1920s		Batch of nine for the Cordoba and Tucuman Railway, renumbered 11–19, and named: Belgrano, Progreso, Rioja, Jujuy, San Juan, Salta, Santa Fe, Santiago, Catamarca
242		1874		0-6-0ST		Preserved	M Shed		Built for Nixon's Navigation Colliery, Merthyr Tydfil, where she worked all her life. Owned by Bristol City Council, Undergoing long-term restoration
254–258		1874–75	J	0-6-0ST	4 ft 8 1/2 in (1,435 mm)	Scrapped			Built for the Somerset and Dorset Joint Railway Nos. 1–5. Numerous rebuilds and conversions, e.g.: No. 1 converted to 0-6-0 tender loco in 1888, reconverted to saddle tank 1908. Four more in 1876 (Nos.320–323)
266		1875		0-4-0ST	4 ft 8 1/2 in (1,435 mm)	Scrapped			Built for Cannock & Rugeley Colliery Co to work the Canock Chase Railways. Sold 1927 to Holditch Mines, Chesterton, Staffordshire
271		1875		0-6-0ST	4 ft 8 1/2 in (1,435 mm)	Scrapped	by September 1935		Built for the Whitland and Cardigan Railway, to the Great Western Railway in 1886, to Bute Works Supply Company, to East Kent Light Railway (No. 1) in 1911. Withdrawn in the 1930s.
279		1875		0-6-0ST	4 ft 8 1/2 in (1,435 mm)	Scrapped	by September 1935		Built for the Llanelly and Mynydd Mawr Railway (Seymour Clarke), to the Great Western Railway in 1923, (No. 969 allocated, but never carried). Withdrawn 1925.
280	Alexander	1875		0-6-0ST		Scrapped			Built for the Port of Bristol Authority. Worked at Avonmouth Docks.
283		1875	T	0-6-0T	4 ft 8 1/2 in (1,435 mm)	Scrapped			Nunnery Colliery Co Ltd, Sheffield
284		1875	HP	0-6-0T	4 ft 8 1/2 in (1,435 mm)	Scrapped			Possibly the first loco built with the patented Handyside's Steep Gradient Apparatus
314		5 October 1875	HP	0-6-0ST	4 ft 8 1/2 in (1,435 mm)	Scrapped			Modified from an earlier 0-4-0T. Built with the patented Handyside's Steep Gradient Apparatus
315–316		5 October 1875	HP	0-6-0ST	4 ft 8 1/2 in (1,435 mm)	Scrapped			Built with the patented Handyside's Steep Gradient Apparatus
318		1876		0-4-0ST	4 ft 8 1/2 in (1,435 mm)	Scrapped			Built for Cannock & Rugeley Colliery Co to work the Canock Chase Railways
320–323		1876	J	0-6-0ST	4 ft 8 1/2 in (1,435 mm)	Scrapped			Built for the Somerset and Dorset Joint Railway Nos. 6–9 built 1876. Follow on to 254–258. Numerous rebuilds and conversions, e.g.: No. 8 converted to side tank in 1888, converted to 0-6-0 tender loco in 1908.
326		1876		0-4-0ST	4 ft 8 1/2 in (1,435 mm)	Scrapped			Built for the Coalpit Heath Colliery Returned to Peckett & Sons in 1906 then resold in 1908 to James Pain Ltd Glendon North, Ironstone Quarries Northants.
338–339		1877		0-6-0ST	4 ft 8 1/2 in (1,435 mm)	Scrapped			Two locomotives built for the Great Yarmouth and Stalham Light Railway. Retained when the Eastern and Midlands Railway became the Midland and Great Northern Joint Railway in 1893. In 1901, No. 15 Ormesby was sold and replaced by a new LNER Class J94. No. 16 Stalham entered LNER service in October 1936, but was withdrawn and scrapped in 1937
340		1877		0-6-0ST	4 ft 8 1/2 in (1,435 mm)	Scrapped			Built for the Whitland and Cardigan Railway (No. 3), to Great Western Railway (No. 1387) in 1886. Rebuilt in 1896; rebuilt again and renumbered 1331 in 1926. Withdrawn in 1950.
352		1877		0-4-0ST	4 ft 8 1/2 in (1,435 mm)	Scrapped	1974		Built for Port Alfred harbour, then stripped and buried post World War I. Dug up January 1960, remains sent to Port Elizabeth museum. Sold for scrap to Chicks Scrap Metals
361-367		1878	TE (Tram Engine)	0-6-2 Tram	not stated	Scrapped			8in by 9in cylinders. For C.P. Harding & Co, Rouen, France.
370		1878		0-4-0ST	4 ft 8 1/2 in (1,435 mm)	Scrapped			Built for Cannock & Wimblebury Colliery Co to work the Canock Chase Railways. After the company went into liquidation, it was either sold or scrapped.
380-381		1877	SWTE (Six Wheeled Tram Engine)	0-6-0 Tram	not stated	Possibly never built			8in by 9in cylinders. No customer given.
382		1878	131	0-6-0ST	4 ft 8 1/2 in (1,435 mm)	Scrapped			Acquired for the Lidgett Colliery from the Fair Oak Colliery at Rugeley, Staffordshire
385		1877		0-6-0ST	4 ft 8 1/2 in (1,435 mm)	Preserved	Mangapps Railway Museum, Essex		Built for the Skinningrove Iron Company, where she worked her entire life. Moved to the Kent and East Sussex Railway in 1965. Presented to Dover Transport Museum in 1980, moved to Mangaps Farm Railway in 2003. Named "Minnie"
387-388			SWTE	?	not stated	Scrapped			8in by 9in cylinders. No customer given.
399–404		1878	HPTE	2-4-2T	18 in (457 mm)	Scrapped			Batch of five trench engines, equipped with the Handyside's Steep Gradient Apparatus. Built for the Royal Engineers for use at Chatham School of Military Engineering
405–407		1878	Z	2-6-0	1,000 mm (3 ft 3 3/8 in)	Scrapped			Batch of three locomotives for the Unino Minero Railway, Brazil. Named: 405 "Dombrigador"; 406 "Francisco Ferreira"; 407 "Colonel Rezendi." 3 ft 6 1/2 in coupled wheels; 10 ft 0 in coupled wheelbase; tender carrying 1,000 gallons water and 50cwt of coal
410	Margaret	1878		0-6-0ST		Preserved	Scolton Manor, near Haverfordwest, Wales		Constructed for the Narberth Road and Maenclochog Railway, then worked for the North Pembrokeshire and Fishguard Railway, the Great Western Railway (No. 1378), sold to the Gwendreath Valleys Railway (No. 2) in 1911, back to GWR in 1923, but not allocated a number, as sold to the Kidwelly Tinplate Company the same year
412-420			SWTE	0-6-2 Tram		Scrapped			8in by 9in cylinders. No customer given.
Peckett & Sons (1880–1958)
421		19 January 1881		Semi- portable pumping engine		Scrapped			Built for the Ebbw Vale Steel, Iron & Coal Co Ltd at Watchet, Somerset. Later used at Gupworthy New Mine, Somerset
428		1883	B1	0-6-0ST	4 ft 8 1/2 in (1,435 mm)	Scrapped			William Gossage & Sons, Widnes
429	Magpie	1883	S1	0-6-0ST	4 ft 8 1/2 in (1,435 mm)	Scrapped			Built for Dowlais iron
431	Edward	1884	W3	0-4-0ST	4 ft 8 1/2 in (1,435 mm)	Scrapped			Built for Blaenavon Colliery
434	Milfraen	1884	B1	0-6-0ST	4 ft 8 1/2 in (1,435 mm)	Scrapped			Built for Blaenavon Colliery
436	9	3 December 1884	W2	0-4-0T		Scrapped			Built for the Crawshay Bros Ltd, Cyfarthfa Ironworks, Merthyr Tydfil, South Wales. Named "No. 9"
439	Bristol (later Phoenix)	1885	M3	0-4-0ST	4 ft 8 1/2 in (1,435 mm)	Scrapped			Built for Daniel Edwards & Co, returned to makers in 1885. Then owned by James Evans of Birmingham, contractor for the Parkgate to West Kirby extension of the LNWR/GWR joint line from Hooton opened on 19 April 1886. Taken over by Meakin and Dean, likely used on the Wirral Railway opened in 1888. Involved in a fatal boiler explosion at Poulton, 5 January 1894 – driver and fireman killed. Later owned by Topham Jones and Railton numbered 14 and renamed PHOENIX used on Kings Dock contract at Swansea, then by H.Lovatt of Wolverhampton and finally by the Duais Tin Plate Co. Ltd. at Pontardulais.
442		1884	M3	0-4-0ST	4 ft 8 1/2 in (1,435 mm)	Scrapped			Holme & King, Sherwood Colliery, nottinghamshire
447	10; Malcolm	23 March 1886	W2	0-4-0T	4 ft 8 1/2 in (1,435 mm)	Scrapped			Built for the Crawshay Bros Ltd, Cyfarthfa Ironworks, Merthyr Tydfil, South Wales. Named "No. 10." Moved to Cwmbran Ironworks, Monmouth, renamed "Malcolm"
450–451		1886		0-6-0ST	4 ft 8 1/2 in (1,435 mm)	Scrapped			A pair built for the Alexandra Docks Railway. First loco withdrawn by GWR in 1926, second transferred to British Railways and was allocated to Newport Pill shed, withdrawn in December 1948 from Oswestry
456	Ellesmere	1887		0-6-0ST	4 ft 8 1/2 in (1,435 mm)	Scrapped			New to Thomas A. Walker for the construction of the Ellesmere Port section of the Manchester Ship Canal. Sold to Anglo-American Oil Company as Jack.
458	Harold	1887			4 ft 8 1/2 in (1,435 mm)				Built for the Port of Bristol Authority. Worked at Avonmouth Docks.
464		1888	X	0-6-0ST	4 ft 8 1/2 in (1,435 mm)	Scrapped			Llanelly & Mynydd Mawr Railway, named JEANNIE WADDELL. John Waddell & Sons, Llanelly. Sold July 1913, and to Byfield Ironstone by 1917. Scrapped around 1923.
466	Lionel	1889	B1	0-6-0ST	4 ft 8 1/2 in (1,435 mm)				Built for the Port of Bristol Authority. Worked at Avonmouth Docks. Sold November 1951
468	Lancaster	1888		0-4-0ST	4 ft 8 1/2 in (1,435 mm)	Scrapped	1964		Supplied new to the Bestwood Coal & Iron Co near Nottingham. Worksplate survives - at auction together with its nameplate March 2025.
471		1890	B1	0-6-0ST	4 ft 8 1/2 in (1,435 mm)	Scrapped			Foxholes Colliery, Swansea
474		1890	X	0-6-0ST	4 ft 8 1/2 in (1,435 mm)	Scrapped			Foxholes Colliery, Swansea
484		1890	W4	0-4-0ST	4 ft 8 1/2 in (1,435 mm)	Scrapped			William Williams & co, Upper Forest & Worcester tinplate, Glamorgan
489		1890	W4	0-4-0ST	4 ft 8 1/2 in (1,435 mm)	Scrapped			Built for William Baird & Co., Twechar Coke Ovens & Collieries, Stirlingshire (No. 14). Later transferred to Gartsherrie Ironworks, Coatbridge, Lanarkshire, and sold to Port of London Authority (No. 74) in 1943.
492		1890	14in special	0-4-0ST	4 ft 8 1/2 in (1,435 mm)	Scrapped			"Pioneer" Nevil Druce & co, Llanelly
498		1891	X	0-6-0ST	4 ft 8 1/2 in (1,435 mm)	Scrapped			Locket's Merthyr Collieries, Mardy Colliery, Glamorgan. Later sold to Burradon & Coxlodge Coal Co., Northumberland.
501		1890	M3	0-4-0ST	2 ft 7 in (787 mm)	Scrapped			Neath Abbey, Glamorgan
503	Monarch	1892	M4	0-4-0ST	4 ft 8 1/2 in (1,435 mm)	Scrapped	1952		George & R, Dewhurst paper mill, Bamberbridge, Lancashire, Cudworth & Johnson, Wrexham, Denbighshire. Later sold to Scottish Agricultural Industries, Leith, Edinburgh as Monarch.
520		1891	R1	0-4-0ST	4 ft 8 1/2 in (1,435 mm)	Scrapped			Millbrook iron and steel
521		1891	W4	0-4-0ST	4 ft 8 1/2 in (1,435 mm)	Scrapped			C. Rowland (contractor), Swansea Harbour Trust No. 1. Sold in 1910 to Broomhill Collieries, Northumberland, and resold in 1927 to Weardale Steel, Coal & Coke Co., County Durham.
526	Lawrence	1893		0-6-0ST	4 ft 8 1/2 in (1,435 mm)	Scrapped	1949		Avonmouth Docks, Bristol Reported incorrectly as Works Number 586 in some sources .
562		1893	W4	0-4-0ST	4 ft 8 1/2 in (1,435 mm)	Scrapped			Briton Ferry Steel
563	Dodo	1893	W4	0-4-0ST	4 ft 8 1/2 in (1,435 mm)	Scrapped			Lougher colliey, Swansea
597		1895	R1	0-4-0ST	4 ft 8 1/2 in (1,435 mm)	Scrapped			Cannock Lodge colliery
599		1895	W4	0-4-0ST	4 ft 8 1/2 in (1,435 mm)	Scrapped			Christopher Rowlands, Prince of Wales dock, R No. 4. Sold 1911 to Phillips, Newport. To Billingsley Colliery, Bridgnorth 3/13.
601	Bull	1895		0-4-0ST	4 ft 8 1/2 in (1,435 mm)	Scrapped	1958		Built for James Dunlop & Co. (later Colvilles), Hallside Colliery, Newton, Lanarkshire (No. 1). Transferred to Clyde Iron Works, Tollcross, Glasgow circa 1920 and sold to Steel Company of Scotland, Hallside Works 1937.
603		1894	X	0-6-0ST	4 ft 8 1/2 in (1,435 mm)	Scrapped			Astley & Tyldesley colliery & salt Company
614	Bear	January 1896	W4	0-4-0ST	4 ft 8 1/2 in (1,435 mm)	Preserved, static exhibit	Buckinghamshire Railway Centre		Built for James Dunlop & Co. (later Colvilles), Clyde Iron Works, Tollcross, Glasgow (No. 2), transferred to Mossend Engineering Works 1941 (as No. 3). It was overhauled by Barclay & Sons in 1941, so is now classed as a hybrid and carries works plates for Peckett on one side and Barclay on the other. It was retired in 1967 and presented to the Locomotive Club of Great Britain (LCGB) by its former owners Messrs Colvilles Ltd of Mossend. In August 1971 it moved from storage at the Scottish Railway Preservation Society at Falkirk to the Sittingbourne and Kemsley Light Railway (SKLR) to whom ownership was transferred in 1996. In 2023, after years of deterioration from being stored in the open air, the SKLR trustees transferred ownership to the Quainton Railway Society. It arrived at the Buckinghamshire Railway Centre in March 2024. The aim is to return the engine to service after restoration. It is the oldest surviving standard-gauge Peckett.
619		1896	X	0-6-0ST	4 ft 8 1/2 in (1,435 mm)	Scrapped			Tirpentwys black vein steam coal & coke
620		1896	B1	0-6-0ST	4 ft 8 1/2 in (1,435 mm)	Scrapped			James Tozer & sons, Siam State Railway
632	Blea Tarn	1896	M4	0-4-0ST	4 ft 8 1/2 in (1,435 mm)	Scrapped			Lancaster Corporation Waterworks, Blea Tarn reservoir construction. sold in 1901 to West Norfolk Farmers' Manure & Chemical Co-op, South Lynn. later to H.M. Greetland
633		1896		0-4-0ST	4 ft 8 1/2 in (1,435 mm)	Scrapped			Stone Crossing cement, Kent
634		1896	R1	0-4-0ST	4 ft 8 1/2 in (1,435 mm)	Scrapped			William Mousley, St Neots
642		1896		0-4-0ST	4 ft 8 1/2 in (1,435 mm)	Scrapped			Built for Glasgow Iron & Steel Co., Clyde Iron Works, Tollcross, Wishaw Iron & Steel Works (No. 18).
643		1896		0-4-0ST	4 ft 8 1/2 in (1,435 mm)	Scrapped	1959		Built for William Baird & Co., Bothwell Park Colliery, Lanarkshire (No. 16). Subsequently transferred to Twechar coke ovens/collieriesand then Gartsherrie Ironworks. Sold to Ministry of Munitions, National Filling Factory Rotherwas, Herefordshire in 1916. Sold to Fullwood Foundry, Mossend, Lanarkshire in 1924 (as No. 2), then to Colvilles Clyde Iron Works, Glasgow (No. 3) in 1937
645		1897		0-4-0ST	4 ft 8 1/2 in (1,435 mm)	Scrapped			Built for Glasgow Iron & Steel Co., Clyde Iron Works, Tollcross, Wishaw Iron & Steel Works, Lanarkshire. Sold to Llanelly Steel Co., Carmarthenshire in 1907.
646	Sydney	1896		0-6-0ST	4 ft 8 1/2 in (1,435 mm)	Scrapped	c.1918		Lever Brothers, Port Sunlight. Cheshire. Later sold to David Colville & Sons, Glengarnock Iron & Steel Works, Ayrshire as Sydney.
654	Alexandria	1897	W4	0-4-0ST	4 ft 8 1/2 in (1,435 mm)	Scrapped			Built for Manchester Ship Canal; name replaced by number 11 c.1914. Sold to Esso at Trafford Park, August 1954.
655	Jaffa	1897	W4	0-4-0ST	4 ft 8 1/2 in (1,435 mm)	Scrapped			Built for Manchester Ship Canal; name replaced by No. 12 around 1914. Sold 1927.
664		1897	S	0-6-0ST	4 ft 8 1/2 in (1,435 mm)	Scrapped			Metropolitan Railway
668		1897	W4	0-4-0ST	4 ft 8 1/2 in (1,435 mm)	Scrapped			Bolckow Vaughan & co, South Bank Steel
676	Herbertson	1897	R1	0-4-0ST	4 ft 8 1/2 in (1,435 mm)	Scrapped			Built for A. Herbertson & Sons, Brunton & Black Pasture Quarries, Chollerton, Northumberland. Sold to British Thomson-Houston, Rugby, Warwickshire in 1911.
678	Gamecock	1897		0-6-0ST	21 in (533 mm)	Scrapped			Charles Nelson & Co lime works, Stockton
681	Selsey	1897		2-4-2	4 ft 8 1/2 in (1,435 mm)	Scrapped			Supplied new to the Hundred of Manhood and Selsey Tramway Co. (name of line changed to West Sussex Railway in 1924 and closed in 1935)
698	Beatrice	1897	B1	0-6-0ST	4 ft 8 1/2 in (1,435 mm)	Scrapped			Price & Wills, Heysham Harbour
690	Filton	1896		0-4-0ST	4 ft 8 1/2 in (1,435 mm)	Scrapped	c.1918		S. Pearson (contractor). Later sold to David Colville & Sons, Glengarnock Iron & Steel Works, Ayrshire as No. 4 Filton.
699	Little Don	1897	M4	0-4-0ST	3 ft (914 mm)	Scrapped			Sheffield Corporation, Langsett Reservoir. Sold to Swansea Corp in 1904 and worked at Cray Reservoir. 197 went to Preston Corp. 1911 to Macdonald & Deakin, Hurstwood Reservoir, Burnley. sold for scrap in 1920.
700	Atlantic	1898	W4	0-4-0ST	4 ft 8 1/2 in (1,435 mm)	Scrapped			Named "Atlantic". Withdrawn by NCB at Seven Sisters Colliery, 1963
709	Pioneer	1898			4 ft 8 1/2 in (1,435 mm)				Bought second-hand from Victoria Petroleum, Cardiff by Port of Bristol Authority. Worked at Avonmouth Docks. Sold after June 1918
710		1898		0-4-0ST	4 ft 8 1/2 in (1,435 mm)	Scrapped			Built for Lobnitz & Co. (Engineers & Shipbuilding), Renfrew.
736	Hilda	1899	W4	0-4-0ST	4 ft 8 1/2 in (1,435 mm)	Scrapped			Built for Skinningrove Iron Co. Ltd
737	Daphne	1899	W4	0-4-0ST	4 ft 8 1/2 in (1,435 mm)	Preserved, static exhibit	Ribble Steam Railway, Preston, Lancashire		Purchased new by Squire Hardwicke for his Tytherington Stone Company. Worked at Church Quarry, Tytherington which was connected to the Thornbury branch line of the Midland Railway. The locomotive was named after the Squire's eldest daughter. In 1923 the locomotive was sold to Pilkington Brothers and used at their Ravenhead works, St Helens. Was subsequently plinthed at children's playgrounds in Skelmersdale and Lytham St Annes. Was also at Fleetwood Locomotive Centre in Lancashire for a period. Moved in 2002 to the Ribble Steam Railway.
738		1899	W4	0-4-0ST	4 ft 8 1/2 in (1,435 mm)	Scrapped	c.1937		Built for William Baird & Co., Twechar Coke Ovens & Collieries, Stirlingshire (No. 17). Later transferred to Gartsherrie Ironworks, Coatbridge, Lanarkshire.
741	Progress	1898		0-4-0ST	4 ft 8 1/2 in (1,435 mm)	Scrapped			T. J. Harrison (Contractors), Liverpool. Sold c.1914 to Scottish Agricultural Industries, Leith, Edinburgh as Progress.
747	Little Fell	1898	M4	0-4-0ST	4 ft 8 1/2 in (1,435 mm)	Scrapped			Lancashire County Council (Waterworks Department) Later to F. Crossdale, Workington, Cumberland and resold in 1934 to Sir W. G. Armstrong, Whitworth & Co., Scotswood Works, Newcastle upon Tyne (as No. 20 Little Fell).
749		1898	X	0-6-0ST	4 ft 8 1/2 in (1,435 mm)	Scrapped			Garswood Coal & Iron Co, Wigan
750		1899	B1	0-6-0ST	4 ft 8 1/2 in (1,435 mm)	Scrapped			George Thomas & Co, Manchester for Nydqvist & Holme, Sweden
753		1898		0-6-0ST	2 ft (610 mm)	Scrapped	February 1939		Built for Westbury Iron Co Ltd, Wiltshire
759		1899		0-4-0ST		Scrapped	September 1960		Built for APCM Bevan's Works, Northfleet. Acquired 1934 by Frindsbury Cement Works. Scrapped by A. Arnold of Chatham, September 1960.
763		1899		0-4-0ST	4 ft 8 1/2 in (1,435 mm)	Scrapped			Built for A. & J. Stewart & Menzies (later Stewarts & Lloyds), Phoenix Tube Works, Rutherglen, Lanarkshire. Subsequently, sold to James Nimmo & Co., Redding Colliery, Polmont, Stirlingshire, and later to United Glass Bottle Manufacturers, St Helens, Lancashire.
770	Croxley Mills	April 1899	W4	0-4-0ST	4 ft 8 1/2 in (1,435 mm)	Scrapped	1937		Originally named "Croxley Mills," latterly worked for John Dickinson and Co, Hertfordshire
771	Wouldham	1899	M4	0-4-0ST	4 ft 8 1/2 in (1,435 mm)		Portland Cement		
784	Lee Moor Nº. 2	1899	M4	0-4-0ST	4 ft 6 in (1,372 mm)	Preserved	South Devon Railway, Buckfastleigh		Named "Lee Moor No. 2" operated on the Lee Moor Tramway in Devon.
786		1899		0-6-0ST		Scrapped			Built for Swansea Harbour Trust, No. 6A. Sold circa 1915 to Cannock & Rugeley Colliery Co to work the Cannock Chase Railways.
		1899	S	0-6-0ST	4 ft 8 1/2 in (1,435 mm)	Scrapped	1961		Built as Metropolitan Railway No. 102, then London Passenger Transport Board No. L54.
808	Kenneth	1900	B1	0-6-0ST		Scrapped	1959		Built for the Port of Bristol Authority. Worked at Avonmouth Docks.
810	Hercules	1900		0-4-0ST	4 ft 8 1/2 in (1,435 mm)	Scrapped			Designed for Ystalyfera Tin Works, named "Hercules." bought by British Railways in 1948 and attached to BR stock. Withdrawn 1954.
830	Baden Powell	1900	R1	0-4-0ST	4 ft 8 1/2 in (1,435 mm)	Scrapped			New to United Alkali, Widnes. Acquired in 1934 by Whitecross Works Co. of Warrington through local dealer J. Brierly & Sons. Donated 1965 to Railway Preservation Society (West Midlands Division) along with another Peckett (Lance); both had been withdrawn from service by the company in 1961, being replaced by two Fowler diesel locomotives. It was intended to make this locomotive a static display but it was in too bad a condition to be moved. Plates went to local collectors. (Note – Locomotive Number is given as 830 in 1968 stock list published in Mercian, Vol. 1 No. 3 but still at Warrington whereas Lance 1038/1906 was at Chasewater)
832	D	May 1900	W4	0-4-0ST	4 ft 8 1/2 in (1,435 mm)	Scrapped			Originally Huntley and Palmers (biscuit bakers), Reading, Berkshire. Ended service at New Cransley Iron and Steel, Kettering
842	Sherman	1900		0-4-0ST	4 ft 8 1/2 in (1,435 mm)	Scrapped			H. Arnold & Son (Contractor), Doncaster. Sold to Scottish Freestone Quarries, Closeburn, Dumfriesshire as Sherman. Later to Blackwell Colliery Co., Shirland Colliery, Derbyshire.
853	Clyde	1901		0-4-0ST	4 ft 8 1/2 in (1,435 mm)	Scrapped	1934		Built for James Dunlop & Co. (later Colvilles), Clyde Iron Works, Tollcross, Glasgow (No. 5)
854	Hallside	1901		0-4-0ST	4 ft 8 1/2 in (1,435 mm)	Scrapped	1945		Built for James Dunlop & Co. (later Colvilles), Clyde Iron Works, Tollcross, Glasgow (No. 6)
855	Shelton	1900		0-6-0ST		Scrapped			
856		22 October 1900	X	0-6-0ST	4 ft 8 1/2 in (1,435 mm)	Scrapped	May, 1932		Worked at Lilleshall Co. Ltd, Telford, Shropshire
862	West End	1901	W4	0-4-0ST		Scrapped	1959		New to West End Colliery, Batley, West Yorkshire. Sold in 1941 to Crawshaw & Warburton for Shawcross Colliery, Ossett and renamed "Crawshaw No2". Sold by the NCB in 1947 and scrapped 1958/9.
877		1901	X	0-6-0ST		Scrapped			Crompton & Shawcross, Hindley
882	Niclausse	1902	W4	0-4-0ST		Scrapped			Williams & Robinson, Queensferry
889	New Globe	1901	M4	0-4-0ST		Scrapped			New Globe cement, Greenhithe
	Lord Roberts	1900	X	0-6-0ST	4 ft 8 1/2 in (1,435 mm)	Scrapped			Built for Coalpit Heath Colliery
890		1901		0-4-0ST	4 ft 8 1/2 in (1,435 mm)	Scrapped			McAlpine (contractor), Glasgow. Subsequently, sold to Thomas Ovens & Sons, Forth Chemical & Manure Works, Bo'ness, West Lothian.
892		1902		0-6-0ST	4 ft 8 1/2 in (1,435 mm)	Scrapped	1937		Built for United Collieries Ltd. (No. 4). Worked at Fauldhouse Colliery, Loganlea Colliery and Bathville Works in West Lothian.
904	Buller	1901	W4?	0-4-0ST	4 ft 8 1/2 in (1,435 mm)	Scrapped			New to the Derwent Valley Water Board Howden to ferry stone from quarries near Grindleford to the construction sites of the Derwent Valley dams. It was named BULLER after Sir Redvers Buller VC of Zulu, Sudan and Boer War fame. In Dec 1913 it was purchased for £450 and became the second engine at Thompson Street Gas Works, Stockton; In 1953, Stockton Gas Co. acquired other locomotives including Peckett no 2142. BULLER was withdrawn from use in 1956. A picture of it in the Stockton Gas Works is held by the Stockton Archives
907	Valencia	1902	W4?	0-4-0ST	4 ft 8 1/2 in (1,435 mm)	Scrapped			Built for the Manchester Ship Canal; name replaced by No. 25 c.1914.
917	Shawcross	January 1902	R1	0-4-0ST	4 ft 8 1/2 in (1,435 mm)	Preserved	Chasewater Railway, Staffordshire		Originally sold to Crowshaw & Warburton of Shawcross in Yorkshire, and named Shawcross. Taken back in part exchange for a new one by Peckett, and resold to Albright & Wilson in 1930. Withdrawn from service in August 1978.
918	Jurassic	1901		0-6-0ST	21 in (533 mm)	Preserved			Built for Charles Nelson & Co. lime works, Stockton. Currently at Lincolnshire Coast Light railway.
920	George Jennings	1902	W4	0-4-0ST	4 ft 8 1/2 in (1,435 mm)				George Jennings Pottery, Dorset
923	Outwood No 1	1901	B1	0-6-0ST	4 ft 8 1/2 in (1,435 mm)	Scrapped	1962		Supplied new to Thomas Fletcher & Co Bolton, Lancs and named Outwood No1 and based at Outwood Collieries. In 1909 Thomas Fletcher was taken over by the Clifton & Kersley Coal Co which in turn was taken over by Manchester collieries and the loco was renamed just Outwood. Withdrawn and scrapped in 1962. Oval engraved brass in as removed condition at Auction Mar 2022 as "Worksplate PECKETT & SONS BRISTOL No 923 1901. Ex Class B1 0-6-0ST".
925		1901		0-4-0ST	4 ft 8 1/2 in (1,435 mm)				New Globe cement
931		1902		0-4-0ST	4 ft 8 1/2 in (1,435 mm)	Scrapped	1950		Built for United Collieries Ltd. (No. 5), later passing to National Coal Board. Worked at Bredisholm Colliery/Wagon Works, Coatbridge, Lanarkshire.
932		1903		0-4-0ST	4 ft 8 1/2 in (1,435 mm)	Scrapped	1958		Built for Langloan Iron & Chemical Co., Coatbridge, Lanarkshire. Works and locomotive sold in 1938 to Thos. W. Ward, Langloan Wagon Repair Depot.
933	Henry Cort	1903	W4	0-4-0ST	4 ft 8 1/2 in (1,435 mm)	Preserved	Foxfield Light Railway, Staffordshire		One of a pair built for Ebbw Vale Steelworks. Moved in 1954 by owners Richard Thomas & Baldwins to their Blisworth ironstone quarry, it then moved to Irthlingborough quarry in July 1957. When the quarries closed on 30 September 1965, the owners offered it to the Foxfield Railway. Moved there in February 1967, "Henry Cort" became the first locomotive to move on the line under preservation.
934	Musket	1903	W4	0-4-0ST	4 ft 8 1/2 in (1,435 mm)	Scrapped			One of a pair built for Ebbw Vale Steelworks to sister 933.
945	Ormerod	1901		0-4-0ST	3 ft (914 mm)				Gorpley Reservoir, Todmorden
947		20 April 1903	M4	0-4-0ST	4 ft 8 1/2 in (1,435 mm)	Scrapped			Built for Stirchley Iron Co Ltd, Stirchley, near Dawley, Salop. After return to Peckett in 1902, it was sold to Foster & Dicksee, contractors for the Horton Estate Light Railway. Later sold to the Portland Cement Company, Rugby
950		1902	R1	0-4-0	4 ft 8 1/2 in (1,435 mm)				Bryngwyn Steel Company, Glamorgan
951	Salisbury	1902		0-6-0	4 ft 8 1/2 in (1,435 mm)				Fountain & Burnley for Woolley colliery, near Darton, South Yorkshire, named. Wharncliffe Woodmoor colliery by 1935. original owner unknown possibly WD Bulford camp or North Gawber Colliery.
958	Queen	1902	X	0-6-0	4 ft 8 1/2 in (1,435 mm)				Derwent Valley water board
959		1902		0-4-0ST	3 ft (914 mm)	Scrapped			Built for the Swansea Corporation Water Works, Cray Reservoir
974	John	1904	W4	0-4-0ST	4 ft 8 1/2 in (1,435 mm)	Scrapped	1959		Swansea Harbour Trust No. 10. Then GWR No. 933. Sold 1927. To Bedlington Coal Co., Northumberland 1937. Passed to National Coal Board in 1947 and used at Bedlington and Choppington collieries.
977		1904		0-4-0ST	4 ft 8 1/2 in (1,435 mm)	Scrapped	1930		Built for Ayr Harbour Trustees, Ayrshire. In 1919 the harbour was purchased by the Glasgow and South Western Railway and the locomotive became G&SWR No. 735, passing to the London, Midland and Scottish Railway in 1923 as No. 16043.
989		1903	B1	0-6-0ST	4 ft 8 1/2 in (1,435 mm)	Scrapped	1959		Built for Netherton Coal Co., Northumberland (No. 1). Passed to National Coal Board in 1947 and used at Netherton, Choppington and Bedlington collieries.
991	Ansley Hall	1905		0-4-0	4 ft 8 1/2 in (1,435 mm)				Built for Ansley colliery. moved to Arley Colliery. 1950. then Binley Colliery 1960
1000	Bessemer	1903	E	0-4-0	4 ft 8 1/2 in (1,435 mm)				Ebbw Vale Steel Iron & Coal
1002		1903		0-4-0T	3 ft (914 mm)	Scrapped			Built for the Commercial Gas Company, Poplar, London
1003		1903		0-4-0T	3 ft (914 mm)	Scrapped			Built for Fisher & Le Fanu, contractors for Goolds Cross and Cashel Railway
1006	Murray	1904	B1	0-6-0ST		Scrapped	1958		Built for the Port of Bristol Authority. Worked at Avonmouth Docks.
1011	Beaufort	1903	E	0-4-0ST		Scrapped			Built for the Ebbw Vale Company, Monmouthshire, Wales
1015		1904	Q	0-6-0T		Scrapped			Ebbw Vale steel
1021	Oakhill	1904		0-4-0ST	2 ft 6 in (762 mm)	Scrapped			Oakhill Brewery, Somerset, later at Penarth Cement Works in South Wales
1024		1905	E	0-4-0ST	4 ft 8 1/2 in (1,435 mm)	Scrapped			Built for Nobel Explosives, Ardeer, Ayrshire (No. 2). Sold to Joseph Harris, Brayton Colliery, Aspatria, Cumbria in 1927.
1026		1902		0-4-0T	3 ft (914 mm)	Preserved	Giant's Causeway and Bushmills Railway, Northern Ireland		Built for the British Aluminium Company, Larne, as their No. 1. Withdrawn 1960, preserved at the Shanes Castle Railway, where it was named "Tyrone."
1029		1904	959	0-4-0T	3 ft 6 in (1,067 mm)	Preserved	SAB plc, Ohlssons Brewery, South Africa		Built for Ohlssons Brewery, Mariendahl (Newlands), near Cape Town
1030		1904		0-4-0ST	2 ft (610 mm)	Scrapped			Built for Mendip Granite & Asphalt Co Ltd for use at their Cranmore Quarry, Shepton Mallet
1037		1905	X	0-6-0ST	4 ft 8 1/2 in (1,435 mm)	Scrapped			Guest Keen & Nettlefolds, Newport
1038	Lance	1906	R1	0-4-0ST	4 ft 8 1/2 in (1,435 mm)	Scrapped	1972		New to Market Overton Quarry, Rutland. Donated in 1965 to Railway Preservation Society (West Midlands Division) by Whitecross Co. of Warrington along with another Peckett (Baden Powell); both had been withdrawn from service by the company in 1961, being replaced by two Fowler diesel locomotives one of which (Diesel No. 1) took the nameplate Lance. Delivered to Chasewater in 1966 and given a coat of green oxide paint but was subsequently considered to be beyond repair and scrapped.
1041	Lord Salisbury	1906	X	0-6-0ST		Scrapped	1965		Built for Coalpit Heath Colliery, then Norton Hill Colliery, later worked all over the North Somerset Coalfield
1051	Trimsaran	1905	B2	0-6-0ST	4 ft 8 1/2 in (1,435 mm)	Scrapped			Trimsaran colliery
1053		1906	E	0-4-0ST	4 ft 8 1/2 in (1,435 mm)	Scrapped			Swansea Harbour Trust No. 11. Then GWR 929. BR 1141
1054		September 1907	E	0-4-0ST		Scrapped			Powlesland & Mason No. 11. Then GWR 927
1055	Beaufort	1905	M5	0-4-0ST	4 ft 8 1/2 in (1,435 mm)	Scrapped			Beaufort works, Morriston, Glamorgan
1057		1905		0-4-0ST	4 ft 8 1/2 in (1,435 mm)	Scrapped			Yorkshire Iron No 7, Ardsley. sold to English Sugar Beet
1060		1905		0-4-0ST	4 ft 8 1/2 in (1,435 mm)	Scrapped			Dillwyn & Co zinc works, Swansea
1067	Nancy	1905		0-6-0ST	4 ft 8 1/2 in (1,435 mm)	Scrapped			The Peckett & Sons works shunter
1068	Hesketh	1905	C	0-6-0ST	4 ft 8 1/2 in (1,435 mm)	Scrapped			Madeley Coal Coke & Brick, staffordshire
1069				0-4-0ST	3 ft 6 in (1,067 mm)	Preserved	Atherton—Herberton Historic Railway, Herberton, Australia		Originally Mt Morgan Mines No. 4. Later became Mt Isa Mines Co Ltd No. 1, where it was out of use by 1955. Initially preserved at St Joseph's Convent School, Mount Isa until c.1982 when sold to, a private collector (Jeff Daly) and transported to Spotswood, Melbourne. In 1989 it was relocated to suburban Bayswater, Melbourne. In August 2009, both Peckett 1069 / Mt Morgan Mines No. 4 and Peckett 1174 / Mt Morgan Mines No. 5 became available for sale. They were sold to a collector and moved to a private location in South-East Queensland. Both have now been acquired by the Atherton – Herberton Historic Railway Inc, with Peckett 1069 delivered to their Herberton base on 7 April 2015. Undergoing restoration. Renamed Donald R Walker
1070	Victoria	1906		0-4-0ST	4 ft 8 1/2 in (1,435 mm)	Scrapped			Ebbw Vale steel
1080	Progress	1907	W5	0-4-0ST	4 ft 8 1/2 in (1,435 mm)	Scrapped			A.J.Keeble, Grafton, Wiltshire
1083		1906	F	0-6-0ST	4 ft 8 1/2 in (1,435 mm)	Scrapped			Seaham Harbour
1084		1906	W4	0-4-0ST	4 ft 8 1/2 in (1,435 mm)	Scrapped			Netherton Colliery, Northumnerland
1085	Gabriel	1905		4-4-0T	3 ft (914 mm)	Scrapped	1936		Built for Schull and Skibbereen Railway, County Cork, Ireland (No. 1). Subsequently, passed to Great Southern Railways (No. 1S).
1086	No. 5 Hualaycha	1906		0-4-0ST	1,000 mm (3 ft 3 3/8 in)	Preserved	Guaqui Workshops, Bolivia		Ferrocarril Guaqui a La Paz (FCG)
1093	Ronald	1907	B2	0-6-0ST		Scrapped	October 1957 by Warn, Stapleton Road, Bristol		Built for the Port of Bristol Authority. Worked at Avonmouth Docks.
1094		1906	X2	0-6-0ST	4 ft 8 1/2 in (1,435 mm)	Scrapped	1965		Built for Netherton Coal Co., Northumberland (No. 2). Passed to National Coal Board in 1947, continued in use at Netherton Colliery
1096		1906		0-4-0ST	750 mm (2 ft 5 1/2 in)				Luchana Mining Company, Spain
1097		1906		0-4-0T	3 ft (914 mm)	Preserved	Ulster Folk and Transport Museum, Cultra, Belfast,		Built for the British Aluminium Company, Larne as their No. 2. Withdrawn 1956.
1098		1907		0-4-0ST	4 ft 8 1/2 in (1,435 mm)	Scrapped	c.1940		Acquired by New Cumnock Collieries, Ayrshire in 1930 (as No. 5).
1105		June 1908	E	0-4-0ST		Scrapped	1960		Built for Swansea Harbour Trust (No. 12), passing to Great Western Railway (No. 968) and British Railways (renumbered 1143 in February 1949). Withdrawn in November 1960 from Shrewsbury, Clee Hill sub-shed
1107				0-4-0ST	4 ft 8 1/2 in (1,435 mm)	Scrapped			Built for coal mine shunting, scrapped at NCB Harrington Colliery
1129		1907		0-4-2	2 ft 6 in (762 mm)				E.F. Clarke, Iquique, Chile
1134	Hutton Hall	1907	Q	0-6-0ST	4 ft 8 1/2 in (1,435 mm)	Scrapped			Cleator & Workington Junction, Cumberland. later LMS 11566
1142		1908		0-4-0ST	4 ft 8 1/2 in (1,435 mm)	Scrapped	1954		Grovesend Steel & Tinplate Co., Gorseinon Works, Glamorganshire. Sold to Fullwood Foundry, Mossend, Lanarkshire in 1920 (as Fullwood No. 3). To Steel Company of Scotland, Hallside Works, Lanarkshire in 1952.
1145		1907		0-4-2	1,000 mm (3 ft 3 3/8 in)				E.F. Clarke, Iquique, Chile
1148	Dorothy	1907		0-6-0ST	4 ft 8 1/2 in (1,435 mm)	Scrapped			Abram Colliery
1151		1907		0-6-0ST	4 ft 8 1/2 in (1,435 mm)	Scrapped			Powlesland & Mason
1152		1907		0-4-0ST	4 ft 8 1/2 in (1,435 mm)				Built for Powlesland and Mason, railway shunting contractors for Swansea Docks, it was their No. 12. Absorbed by the GWR in 1921, it became No. 1152. This loco is Peckett Works No. 1179, not 1152. The photo is of BR No. 1152.
1157		1907		0-4-0ST	2 ft 6 in (762 mm)				E.F. Clarke, Iquique, Chile
1158		1907		0-4-0ST	2 ft 6 in (762 mm)				E.F. Clarke, Iquique, Chile
1159	Annie	August 1908	R1	0-4-0ST	4 ft 8 1/2 in (1,435 mm)	Preserved	Mangapps Railway Museum		Built for Yates Duxbury paper mills, Bury, Lancashire [51] Regularly maintained by Peckett, receiving new boilers in 1928 and 1947. Withdrawn 1970 with the name Annie being given to Andrew Barclay Works No 945. A third locomotive resident at Yates Duxbury was Peckett Works No 1370 and all three locomotives have been preserved. Annie initially went to Bury Transport Museum then to Yorkshire Dales Railway at Embsay. Withdrawn for 10-year overhaul in 2003. Arrived at Quainton in private ownership on 11 April 2018. Moved to Mangapps in 2023.
1161		1908	B2	0-6-0ST	4 ft 8 1/2 in (1,435 mm)	Scrapped	1953		Built for Seaton Burn Coal Co., Northumberland (No. 3), passing with business to Hartley Main Collieries in 1938 and thence to National Coal Board in 1947. Used at Killingworth NCB engine shed.
1162	George	1908	B2	0-6-0ST	4 ft 8 1/2 in (1,435 mm)	Scrapped	1955		Built for North Walbottle Coal Co., Northumberland, passing to National Coal Board in 1947. Used at North Walbottle Colliery.
1163	Whitehead	December 1908	M5	0-4-0ST	4 ft 8 1/2 in (1,435 mm)	Preserved	Midland Railway, Butterley		Initially preserved on the West Somerset Railway
1173		1908	W2	0-4-0ST	4 ft 8 1/2 in (1,435 mm)	Scrapped			Worked at the NCB Mountain Colliery, Grovesend
1174		1908	R1	0-4-0ST	3 ft 6 in (1,067 mm)	Preserved	Atherton—Herberton Historic Railway, Herberton, Australia		Built for the Mount Morgan Gold Mining Co., Australia – Mt Morgan Mines No. 5. Moved to Mount Isa Mines Co Ltd as No. 2. It was out of use at Mt Isa by 1954. Peckett 1174 was initially preserved at Barkly Highway State School, Soldiers Hill, Mount Isa. In 1992 it was sold to a private collector (Jeff Daly?) and transported to suburban Bayswater, Melbourne. In August 2009, both Peckett 1174 and Peckett 1069 were sold to a collector and moved to a private location in South-East Queensland. Both have now been acquired by the Atherton – Herberton Historic Railway Inc, with Peckett 1174 delivered to their Herberton base on 18 May 2015. Undergoing restoration
1179		1912	E	0-4-0ST					Powlesland & Mason No. 12. Then GWR 935. BR 1152
1180		1912	E	0-4-0ST					Built for Charlaw & Sacriston Collieries Co Ltd, County Durham
1188	Delia	1908	G	0-6-0ST					Moss Hall, Wigan
1189		1908	M4	0-4-0ST	3 ft (914 mm)				P.J.Kinlen, Roundwood Reservoir, Ireland
1196	Sandal	1912	OY	0-4-0ST					Dyffryn steel
1197		1909	Yorktown	0-4-0ST					First of a total of 11 locomotives built to this design between 1909 and 1943, utilising several standard Peckett parts found on a number of the firm's narrow gauge classes. Supplied new to the Yorktown & Blackwater Gas Co. in Camberley, Surrey, which gave its name to the type. They were ideal for shunting one or two wagons around on sites with restrictive curvature, and found use as far afield as Weston-super-Mare and Norwich.
1203	The Earl	1910		0-6-0ST	4 ft 8 1/2 in (1,435 mm)	Scrapped			Built for Deep Duffryn Colliery, Mountain Ash, South Wales
1204	Daisy	1910		0-6-0ST	4 ft 8 1/2 in (1,435 mm)	Scrapped			No. 70228 named "Daisy," out of use on the Longmoor Military Railway by 1947
1207	Crookall	1909		0-4-0ST	3 ft (914 mm)	scrapped			Fylde Water Board, Grizedale Lea Reservoir; transferred to Stocks Reservoir in c. 1921 sold in 1932 to J. Thorp & Sons, Derby who then resold it two months later to Derby Corporation and used during the Riverlands Scheme. 1934 went to H. Potter & Co, Nottingham
1209	Sapper	1910	R2	0-4-0ST					Nevill Druce & Co, Llanelly
1213		1914		0-4-0ST	3 ft 6 in (1,067 mm)				Pukemiro colliery, New Zealand
1217		1910		0-4-0	3 ft 6 in (1,067 mm)	Scrapped			Built for Butler Bros Ltd, New Zealand. Later converted to a diesel
1242		1911	X2	0-6-0ST					Manvers Main Colliery, Yorkshire
1243	Strathcona	1910	FA	0-6-0ST		Scrapped	at Avonmouth Docks by Rose (Iron & Steel Ltd.) of Bristol circa December 1959		Built for the Port of Bristol Authority. Worked at Avonmouth Docks. "Similar to ‘Henry’ and ‘Edward’ but with higher boiler pitch". Vacuum fitted. Boiler reused on ‘Ashton’.
1244	Mackenzie	1910	FA	0-6-0ST		1960			Identical to ‘Strathcona’. Vacuum fitted to work passenger trains. new boiler fitted in 1955, but in 1960, fitted to ‘Henbury’ when scrapped
1257	Uppingham	November 1912	R2	0-4-0ST		Preserved	Rutland Railway Museum		New to Uppingham Ironstone Quarry in Rutland, England. Later moved to Market Overton quarry, then in 1947 to the Stanton Ironworks Co. at Wirksworth, Derbyshire. Withdrawn for preservation in 1972.
1264	Henry	1913	B2	0-6-0ST		Scrapped	October 1957 by Warn, Stapleton Road, Bristol		Built for the Port of Bristol Authority. Worked at Avonmouth Docks. Boiler reused on ‘Ashton’.
1270	Triassic	1912		0-6-0ST	2 ft (610 mm)	preserved	Bala Lake Railway, Wales		A pioneer of preservation, having been the first industrial loco to be bought for preservation by late J. B. Latham in the 1950s, after a working life at Southam Cement Works where it worked with 4 other engines of the same class. Previously on Statfold Barn Railway, currently stored at Bala Lake Railway. Out of service pending an extensive overhaul
1271	Bristowe Hall	1911	Y	0-4-0ST					Workington steel
1282		1912	X2	0-6-0ST		Scrapped	1951		Built for Swansea Harbour Trust (No. 15), passing to Great Western Railway (No. 1085) and British Railways (renumbered 1146 in February 1949). Withdrawn and scrapped January 1951 at Swansea East Dock shed.
1283		1913	X2	0-6-0ST	4 ft 8 1/2 in (1,435 mm)	Scrapped	1962		Built for Ashington Coal Co., Northumberland (No. 11), passing to National Coal Board in 1947. Used at Ashington, Broomhill and Pegswood collieries.
1244	Hokitika	1912		0-6-0ST	3 ft (914 mm)				built for John Lysaght steel, Scunthorpe. rebuilt in 1913 to metre gauge renamed "Jean" Sarawak Government Railway
1285		1925	M5	0-4-0ST					Greenwich gas works
1287	Fola	1912	SX12	0-4-0ST	4 ft 8 1/2 in (1,435 mm)	Scrapped			Worked at the Tunnel Cement works, Purfleet, Essex.
1288	Holwell No 5	1912		0-4-0ST	3 ft (914 mm)				Holwell ironstone
1302		1913	X2	0-6-0ST		Scrapped	1951		Built for Swansea Harbour Trust (No. 16), passing to Great Western Railway (No. 1086) and British Railways (renumbered 1147 in March 1949). Withdrawn April 1951 from Swansea Danygraig shed.
1311		1914				Scrapped	1964		New to the Aberthaw and Bristol Channel Portland cement Company at its Rhoose Works, transferring to Aberthaw Works in 1957. Worksplate survives - sold at auction 22 Jan 2011.
1312		1914	R2	0-4-0ST					Pukemiro colliery, New Zealand
1314	Stanley	1914		0-4-0ST					Portland cement, Wouldham
1315	Lamport	1914		0-6-0ST	3 ft 6 in (1,067 mm)	scrapped			Scaldwell ironstone
1316	Scaldwell	1913		0-6-0ST	3 ft (914 mm)	Preserved, static exhibit	Southwold Railway Trust, Suffolk		Built for the Staveley Coal and Iron Company's Scaldwell Tramway, Northampton
1318	Anglo-Dane	April 1913	R2	0-4-0ST		Scrapped			Worked at the Tunnel Cement works, Purfleet, Essex. Named "Anglo-Dane"
1326		1915		0-4-0ST	4 ft 8 1/2 in (1,435 mm)	Scrapped	c.1968		War Department, Hilsea, Hampshire. Sold c.1954 to Thos. W. Ward, Langloan Wagon Repair Depot, Coatbridge, Lanarkshire (as No. 4).
1327	Mesozoic	1913		0-6-0ST	2 ft (610 mm)	Preserved	Bromyard and Linton Light Railway		Built for Southam Cement. Non-operational
1328		1913	E	0-4-0ST	4 ft 8 1/2 in (1,435 mm)				Powlesland & Mason No. 3. Then GWR 696. BR 1150
1329		1913	E	0-4-0ST	4 ft 8 1/2 in (1,435 mm)	Scrapped			Supplied to Baldwins Ltd Landore Glamorgan. Makers plate at Auction Mar 2022 as "Worksplate PECKETT & SONS LTD BRISTOL No 1329 1913 ex E Class 0-4-0 ST"
1330	Queniee	1914		0-4-0ST	4 ft 8 1/2 in (1,435 mm)				Newmarket Colliery, Yorkshire
1335		1913	X2	0-6-0ST	4 ft 8 1/2 in (1,435 mm)	Scrapped	1962		Built for Ashington Coal Co., Northumberland (No. 12), passing to National Coal Board in 1947. Used at Ashington and Pegswood collieries.
1336	South Kirkby No5	1914		0-6-0ST	4 ft 8 1/2 in (1,435 mm)				South Kirkby colliery, Yorkshire
1340	Millgrove	1919		0-4-0ST	4 ft 8 1/2 in (1,435 mm)				Cleator & Workington Junction. then LMS 11567
1345	Mond Nickel No. 1	1914		0-4-0ST		Preserved	Gwili Railway, Wales		Built for Mond Nickel & Co at Clydach in the Swansea valley where it became MN Co No 1. The Mond Nickel Co. was absorbed by the International Nickel Company (INCO) in 1928, which eventually became Vale. After closure, a heritage group named the Swansea Vale Railway Society, leased a section of track between Upper Bank and Six Pit Works. It was restored and operated there. In 2007 the lease expired and Swansea Council decided to redevelop the area. The group merged with the Gwili Railway near Carmarthen, and moved most of their rolling stock, including this locomotive where it has been cosmetically restored into lined maroon livery. The locomotive is temporarily stabled out of public view
1346		1914	W5	0-4-0ST		Scrapped			Supplied to Vickers Ltd No5. Worksplate survives - sold at auction Nov 2022
1351	Lion	1915	E	0-4-0ST		Preserved	Lincolnshire Wolds Railway, Grimsby		Royal Arsenal, Woolwich, London. Sold in 1950 to Wallsend Slipway & Engineering, Northumberland. Converted to oil burning in 1959.
1354		1915	OX	0-6-0ST	4 ft 8 1/2 in (1,435 mm)				Gwaun Cae Gurwen colliery, Glamorgan
1356	Conciliation, later Kent	1914		4-4-0T	3 ft (914 mm)	Scrapped	1953		Built for Schull and Skibbereen Railway, County Cork, Ireland (No. 3). Subsequently, passed to Great Southern Railways (No. 3S).
1362	Bulan	1914		4-4-0	1,000 mm (3 ft 3 3/8 in)				Sawarak Government railway
1370		1915	R2	0-4-0ST	4 ft 8 1/2 in (1,435 mm)	Preserved	Buckinghamshire Railway Centre		New to Coventry Ordnance Factory, then to GEC Stafford and named “Lady Godiva”. Bought by Cohens scrap dealers and loco merchants and sold to Yates Duxbury & Sons Ltd, Papermill at Heap Bridge Bury, Lancs. and named 'May'. One of three locomotives employed on the line which connected to what is now the East Lancashire Railway line from Bury to Heywood. All three locomotive have been preserved. See also Peckett Works No. 1159 Annie (the other engine was Andrew Barclay Works No 945) By 1970 it had become the spare engine as the steam brakes had failed. Sold to Dr Peter Beet, for preservation in 1975 and moved to Steamtown Carnforth in non-operational condition. Stored for several years before overhaul eventually started. The loco was in very poor condition and needed extensive works both mechanically and to the boiler. Entered traffic in 2009 at the East Lancashire Railway and operated there for a few years before moving to Beamish Open Air Museum in Durham (2018–2019). Offered for sale in December 2022 and purchased by Quainton Railway Society and moved to the Buckinghamshire Railway Centre where she arrived in January 2023
1375		1914	M5	0-4-0ST	4 ft 8 1/2 in (1,435 mm)	Scrapped			Built for J.R Wood and Company, Southampton
1376	BAC Nº. 1	1915		0-4-0ST	4 ft 8 1/2 in (1,435 mm)	Preserved	Caledonian Railway, Brechin		Built for British Aluminium Co., Burntisland, Fife
1377	Edward	1914	B2	0-6-0ST		Scrapped	October 1957 by Warn, Stapleton Road, Bristol		Built for the Port of Bristol Authority. Worked at Avonmouth Docks.
1378	Westminster	1914	B2	0-6-0ST	4 ft 8 1/2 in (1,435 mm)	Preserved	Northampton & Lamport Railway		Built for a War Office order. Delivered to Sir John Jackson on 6 November 1914 for use on the Larkhill Military Railway. Moved to Fovant Military Railway on Salisbury Plain. After end of World War I, sold to Associated Portland Cement and sent to their Houghton Regis, Dunstable site, then moved to APC's Shipton-on-Cherwell site. Ended working life as APC's No5 at Kiddlington Works, Oxfordshire. Sold in 1972 and preserved at the Kent and East Sussex Railway, then found on a piece of track at the former East Tisted, Hampshire. Moved to Northampton in 1998
1380	Perseverance	1914		0-4-0ST	4 ft 8 1/2 in (1,435 mm)				H.Crowshaw & Co, Lightfoot colliery
1384	MOSTON	1914		0-4-0ST	2 ft (610 mm)	Scrapped			One of a batch of four later locomotives, a follow on order from four 1907 examples, built for Manchester Corporation Rivers Department for their Davyhulme Sewage Works. NAMEPLATE "MOSTON" survives - sold at auction 22 Jan 2011 (Gauge given in sales detail is 3 ft)
1390	Avon	1915		0-4-0ST	4 ft 8 1/2 in (1,435 mm)	Scrapped	1973		Imperial Chemical Industries Witton, Birmingham and Bilston, Staffordshire. Sold to W. H. Arnott Young & Co. (Shipbreakers) in 1956 and used in Old Kilpatrick and latterly Dalmuir scrapyards in Dunbartonshire.
1397		1915	X2	0-6-0ST	4 ft 8 1/2 in (1,435 mm)				Swansea Harbour Trust No 17. Then GWR 937
1402	Progress	1915		0-6-0ST	4 ft 8 1/2 in (1,435 mm)				Desborough Co-op, Northamptonshire
1406		1915		0-4-0ST	3 ft (914 mm)	Scrapped	1958		Built for David Colville & Sons, Dalzell Iron & Steel Works, Motherwell, Lanarkshire (No. 21).
1410		1915		0-6-0ST	4 ft 8 1/2 in (1,435 mm)				South Kirkby colliery, Yorkshire
1424		1916	X2	0-6-0ST		Scrapped			Built for the Melingriffith Tin Plate Works, Whitchurch, Cardiff
1426		November 1916	B2	0-6-0ST	4 ft 8 1/2 in (1,435 mm)	Preserved	Swansea Museum's Llandore Collections Centre		Built for the South Wales Coalfield, worked at Brynlliw Colliery
1430	Adam	1916	R2	0-4-0ST					Ministry of Munitions, Chilwell shell factory
1437		1916		0-4-0ST	4 ft 8 1/2 in (1,435 mm)	Scrapped	1958		Built for John Williams & Co, Excelsior Iron & Steel Works, Wishaw, Lanarkshire (No. 3)
1438		1912	W5	0-4-0ST	4 ft 8 1/2 in (1,435 mm)	Preserved	Appleby Frodingham Railway		
1449		1916	E	0-4-0ST					Powlesland & Mason No. 4. Then GWR 779. BR 1151. Withdrawn from Swansea East Dock 8/63. Sold to R.S. Hayes, Bridgend for scrap 1/64. Cut up 4/65.
1450	Monkland	1916	E	0-4-0ST	4 ft 8 1/2 in (1,435 mm)	Scrapped	1951		Built for James Dunlop & Co. (later Colvilles), Clyde Iron Works, Tollcross, Glasgow (No. 11)
1454	Birley No 5	1917	W5	0-4-0ST					Supplied to Shireoaks colliery and named Birley No 5. Worksplate survives - at auction March 2025 (Auction details indicate Sheffield Coal Company, Beighton colliery).
	No 1	1916		0-4-0ST					Delivered new to Nechells Power Station in 1916. When Steam working finished in November 1971, Locomotive No. 1 was repaired and transferred to Northampton Power Station. Her sister, No. 2 (and the three big Robert Stephenson and Hawthorn 0-6-0STs) were made available for sale.
	No 2	1916 ?		0-4-0ST					Worked at Nechells Power Station. When Steam working finished in November 1971, her sister (Locomotive No 1) was repaired and transferred to Northampton Power Station. No. 2 (and the three big Robert Stephenson and Hawthorn 0-6-0STs) were made available for sale.
1456	Margot	1918	B2	0-6-0ST			Bloxham & Whiston Ironstone Company, Oxfordshire		
1461	Broomhill	1917	R2	0-4-0ST			Stephens & Co Brick, Kidwelly, Carmarthenshire		
1464		1917	E	0-4-0ST			Royal Arsenal, Woolwich		
1465		1917	E	0-4-0ST	4 ft 8 1/2 in (1,435 mm)	Scrapped			Built for Hafodyrynys Colliery, Pontypool, South Wales. Named "Sir Charles Allen". For later history see 1524
1468		1917		0-4-0ST	4 ft 8 1/2 in (1,435 mm)	Scrapped	1951		United Alkali Co., Allhusen Works, Gateshead, County Durham. Later sold to Edward Collins & Sons, Kelvindale Paper Mills, Glasgow.
1474–1475		1917		0-4-0ST	4 ft 8 1/2 in (1,435 mm)	Scrapped	1965 & 1959		Built for David Colville & Sons, Dalzell Iron & Steel Works, Motherwell, Lanarkshire (Nos. 29 & 30)
1477		1917		0-4-0ST	4 ft 8 1/2 in (1,435 mm)	Scrapped			North British Locomotive Company, Hyde Park Works, Glasgow
1480		1918		0-4-0ST	4 ft 8 1/2 in (1,435 mm)				Ruston Proctor, lincoln
1498		1914		0-4-0ST	4 ft 8 1/2 in (1,435 mm)				United Steel, Cottesmore
1505	"Whitby"	1918		0-4-0ST	4 ft 8 1/2 in (1,435 mm)				Harbury cement
1506		1918		0-4-0ST	4 ft 8 1/2 in (1,435 mm)				Yorkshire Iron no 8, Ardsley. sold to George Hodsman & sons in 1928
1512	Gavell	1918	E	0-4-0ST	4 ft 8 1/2 in (1,435 mm)	Scrapped			Built for William Baird & Co., Twechar Coke Ovens & Collieries, Stirlingshire (No. 2). Later transferred to Gartsherrie Ironworks, Coatbridge, Lanarkshire, and sold to Eccles Slag Co., Scunthorpe, Lincolnshire in 1937.
1519	Victory	1919	X2	0-6-0ST	4 ft 8 1/2 in (1,435 mm)				Houghton Main colliery, Barnsley
1522		October 1918	E	0-4-0ST	4 ft 8 1/2 in (1,435 mm)	Scrapped	1959		Built for Swansea Harbour Trust (No. 18), passing to Great Western Railway (No. 1098) and British Railways (renumbered 1145 in January 1950). Withdrawn in July 1959 from Danygraig shed
1523	MARSHALL-FOCH (Previously No. 33)	1918		0-4-0ST	4 ft 8 1/2 in (1,435 mm)	Scrapped			Delivered new to Ebbw Vale Steel Iron & Coal Company. Named after the World War One French Commander who became Supreme Allied Commander in late March 1918. Nameplate MARSHALL-FOCH auctioned June 2024
1524		1919	E	0-4-0ST	4 ft 8 1/2 in (1,435 mm)	Scrapped			Unusual history. Built as 0-4-0ST No. 1524 of 1919. In 1967 rebuild, retaining chassis but using parts from: Ebbw Vale Steelworks 1907 0-4-0ST Works No. 2 (Originally Richard, Thomas and Baldwin No. 31 "Sir Charles Allen") which had been a rebuild using parts (e.g. the saddle tank) from Peckett 14" 0-4-0ST No. 1465 of 1917 (RTB No. 22 "Nasmyth"). Last worked at Glyntillery Colliery, Hafodyrynys, Pontypool circa 1970
1525	Fullarton	1919	E	0-4-0ST	4 ft 8 1/2 in (1,435 mm)	Scrapped	1933		Built for James Dunlop & Co. (later Colvilles), Clyde Iron Works, Tollcross, Glasgow (No. 12)
1530		1919		0-4-0ST	4 ft 8 1/2 in (1,435 mm)				Delivered new to the CWS Soap Works near Irlam, The Soap Works ceased to use its rail connection in the 1960s. Sold and moved to Falmouth Docks and Engineering where it became No 6. After being withdrawn from service, British Transport Commission asset No 1430, was donated to Poldark Mine open air museum (Dec 1978). Suffered the indignity of being sold off in on EBay in 2006 but thanks to the generosity of the trustees of the Chacewater Railway in Staffordshire and other assistance, was returned to Cornwall in 2015 and forms part of the Cornish Heritage Collection. (Note: Poldark website says it was new to Cooperative Irlam margarine factory)
1532	Kapai	1920	E	0-4-0ST	4 ft 8 1/2 in (1,435 mm)	Scrapped	at Birds Long Marston		Ex NCB Pooley Hall Colliery, Polesworth nr. Tamworth Staffs. The name is of New Zealand origin being Māori for very "Good, fine; excellent; very pleasant." Nameplate KAPAI and matching Worksplate auction June 2023
1538		1919	E	0-4-0ST	4 ft 8 1/2 in (1,435 mm)	Scrapped	1963		Built for Singer Manufacturing Company, Clydebank, Dunbartonshire. Sold to Coltness Iron Co., Newmains, Lanarkshire in 1962 but resold for scrap in 1963
1547	Victory	April 1919		0-4-0ST	4 ft 8 1/2 in (1,435 mm)	Preserved, static exhibity	Midland Railway, Swanwick Junction		Delivered to M & W Grazebrook Ltd., Netherton Colliery & Furnaces, Staffordshire. Then sold to British Celanese, Spondon. Preserved at Derby Industrial Museum from the early 1970s
1548		1920		0-4-0ST	4 ft 8 1/2 in (1,435 mm)	Scrapped	1954		Built for Culter Paper Mills, Peterculter, Aberdeenshire
1555		March 1920	M5	0-4-0ST	4 ft 8 1/2 in (1,435 mm)	Preserved			Now disguised as "Ivor the Engine"
1556		1920	E	0-4-0ST	5 ft 3 in (1,600 mm)	Scrapped	Bandon Distillery		Sold to Great Southern Railways (no. 495) in 1930 after closure of distillery; to Córas Iompair Éireann in 1945, withdrawn 1949
1560	Edith	1920	OY	0-4-0ST	4 ft 8 1/2 in (1,435 mm)				Bengal Iron Company, India
1565	Sir John Wyndham Beynon		E	0-4-0ST	4 ft 8 1/2 in (1,435 mm)	Scrapped			Built for Hafodyrynys Colliery, Pontypool, South Wales.
1567	Ackton Hall No.3	1920	X2	0-6-0ST	4 ft 8 1/2 in (1,435 mm)	Preserved	Foxfield Light Railway, Staffordshire		Built for Ackton Hall Colliery and named "Ackton Hall No. 3"
1579	Pectin	April 1921	M5	0-4-0ST	4 ft 8 1/2 in (1,435 mm)	Preserved	Yeovil Railway Centre, Somerset		Built for British Aluminium Co., Burntisland, Fife (as BAC No. 2). Subsequently, preserved at the Bulmers Cider Railway Museum, Hereford, where it acquired the apple-related name Pectin
1585		1922	R2	0-4-0ST	4 ft 8 1/2 in (1,435 mm)	Scrapped			Built for brewery of Truman, Hanbury and Buxton, Burton upon Trent
1586	No. 3	1922		0-6-0ST	4 ft 8 1/2 in (1,435 mm)	Scrapped	1968		Supplied new to Newdigate Colliery where it spent its entire life until withdrawn to be scrapped.
1596	Ainsbury	1922		0-4-0ST	4 ft 8 1/2 in (1,435 mm)	Scrapped			Built for Bradford Corporation for use on Esholt Sewage Works Railway
1611		1923	W5	0-4-0ST	4 ft 8 1/2 in (1,435 mm)	Preserved, in parts			Delivered to Courtaulds, Coventry, subsequently sold to Albright and Wilson, Portishead. Sold by the Swanage Railway in January 2009, for £5,800 on eBay. Observed at site of Beal station Northumberland on 26 October 2011.
1616		1923	B2	0-6-0ST	4 ft 8 1/2 in (1,435 mm)	Scrapped	1959		G. Cohen, Sons & Co. (contractors). To Port of Tyne Authority in 1938 (as No. 4) and used at Albert Edward Dock, Northumberland and Tyne Dock, County Durham.
1628	Bella	1923	W5	0-4-0ST	4 ft 8 1/2 in (1,435 mm)	Scrapped	1968		Built for the Co-operative Wholesale Society, Whittle Colliery, Northumberland, passing to National Coal Board in 1947.
1630		1923		0-6-0T	3 ft 6 in (1,067 mm)	Preserved	Pukemiro Line, New Zealand		Built for Pukemiro Colliery, Rotowaro, New Zealand
1631	Marcia	May 1923	1287	0-4-0T		Preserved	Kent and East Sussex Railway		Built for Constable's Matlock Quarries, Derbyshire. Sold to Marcus Bain, Ballochmyle Quarry, Mauchline, Ayrshire circa 1932. Sold to Hardman & Holden Ltd, Salford, Greater Manchester in 1931, named "No. 12 Marcia", after the wife of the managing director James Clayton. Donated to K&ESR upon withdrawal, in 1962. Sold to a private individual and then subsequently offered for auction by executors in April 2024.
1632	Liassic	1923		0-6-0ST	2 ft (610 mm)	Preserved	Statfold Barn Railway, Tamworth		Built for Southam Cement
1636	Fonmon	1924	B2	0-6-0ST	4 ft 8 1/2 in (1,435 mm)	Preserved	Ribble Steam Railway		Built for Aberthaw & Bristol Channel Portland Cement Co Ltd, it worked at their cement works and the Turners Asbestos Works in Rhoose, South Wales.Preserved at the Avon Valley Railway, nr Bristol in the 1970s, where it worked until expiry of its boiler certificate in 1990. Operated on the Spa Valley Railway until its boiler certificate expired in 2009. Moved to the Ribble Steam Railway in 2016.
1638	Bristol	1923	R2	0-4-0ST	4 ft 8 1/2 in (1,435 mm)	Scrapped			Worked in Southampton Docks
1645		1924		0-6-0ST	3 ft 6 in (1,067 mm)	Stored in poor condition, pending restoration.	Bay of Islands Vintage Railway		Built for Glen Afton Coal Co, 1924–1958. Static display Huntly West playground 1960–1978. Private ownership 1978–1989.
1651		1924		0-4-0ST	4 ft 8 1/2 in (1,435 mm)				South Yorkshire Chemical, Rotherham
1662		19 May 1924	OX1	0-6-0-ST		Scrapped			The first of three ordered by the Warwickshire Coal Company for the Coventry Colliery, it became Coventry No. 2. Refurbished at Andrew Barclay in 1963, it then worked at Arley Colliery, before returning to the Coventry Colliery in September 1968. Scrapped onsite by Thos. W. Ward the following year
1664		June 1924	R2	0-4-2T	3 ft 6 in (1,067 mm)	Preserved	Whangarei Steam and Model Railway Club, Northland, New Zealand		One of three 0-4-2T's built for Wilsons (NZ) Portland Cement Ltd. (now Golden Bay Cement Co. Ltd.), for use at their Portland Cement Works south of Whangarei. Bought by WS&MRC in 1990
1666	Nellie	1924	R2	0-4-0ST		Scrapped	June 1970		Built for George Skey & Co. Ltd., Tame Valley Colliery and Brick & Tile Works near Wilencote, Staffordshire. Moved to Hawfield Brick & Pipe Works, Swadlincote in 1931. In October 1953, moved to J. C. Staton & Co Ltd, Plasterworks of Tutbury, where it was scrapped in 1970. The works plate survives – sold at auction March 2022.
1671	Fylde	1924		0-4-0ST	3 ft (914 mm)	scrapped			Fylde Water Board, Stocks Reservoir. Went to Derby Corporation 1932 and H.Potter, Nottingham 1934 same as 1207 Crookall. Later to Jordan & Co., Caerphilly and was next to GWR Caephilly works in 1936. 1943 went to Consett Iron Company for Butsfield Quarry, County Durham. Scrapped there 1951.
1672	Hodder	1924		0-4-0ST	3 ft (914 mm)	scrapped			Fylde Water Board, Stocks Reservoir. Derby Corporation 1932 and H. Potter, Nottingham 1934. re-gauged to metre for the Clay Cross Company to work the Crich Quarry Tramway (now occupied by the tramway museum). Scrapped 1957.
1675		1924	R2	0-6-0ST	4 ft 8 1/2 in (1,435 mm)				South Wales Electrical Power Distribution Company, Upper Boat powerstation
1676		1925		0-6-0ST	4 ft 8 1/2 in (1,435 mm)				Ty Mawr colliery, Rhondda
1682		1925	1682	0-4-0ST	4 ft 8 1/2 in (1,435 mm)	Scrapped	August 1960		Built for Oxford & District Gas Company, Oxfordshire
1687	Gwen	1926	W6	0-4-0ST	4 ft 8 1/2 in (1,435 mm)	Scrapped			Built for the Co-Operative Wholesale Society, Shilbottle Colliery, Northumberland. To N. H. & B. Collieries, Winning 'A' Colliery, Derbyshire in 1939.
1689		May 1925	R2	0-4-0ST	4 ft 8 1/2 in (1,435 mm)	Scrapped			Built for Tunnel Portland Cement, later worked for Alpha Cement
1690	Lady Angela	1 July 1926	R2	0-4-0ST	4 ft 8 1/2 in (1,435 mm)	Preserved, undergoing restoration as of January 2024	South Devon Railway, Buckfastleigh		Supplied to Gypsum Mines Ltd, New Kingston, Nottinghamshire. Moved into preservation at Shackerstone in 1971
1691	Non Slip No 3	1925	XL	0-6-0ST	4 ft 8 1/2 in (1,435 mm)				Joseph Brookes, Lightcliffe, Yorkshire
1692	Sextus	1925	M5	0-4-0ST	2 ft 8 in (813 mm)				Pike Brothers clay, Dorset
1710		1926		0-4-0ST	5 ft 6 in (1,676 mm)				S.Pearson & Son for Valparaiso port construction contract, may have been sold off at end of contract about 1930, most likely to the Chilean Electric Tramway and Light Company
1711		1926		0-4-0ST	2 ft 6 in (762 mm)	Preserved	Puffing Billy Railway, Melbourne, Australia		Built for the Metropolitan Gas Co., Melbourne, Australia, named Sir John Grice in 1928. Withdrawn 1941, sold in 1962, it joined the Whistle Stop Amusement Park, Frankston in 1965. Came to Puffing Billy in 1974 as a static exhibit
1721	Fyffe	1926	B3	0-6-0ST	4 ft 8 1/2 in (1,435 mm)	1960			Built for the Port of Bristol Authority. Worked at Avonmouth Docks.
1722	Rocket	December 1926	W6	0-4-0ST		Preserved	Telford Steam Railway		Built for Courtaulds and worked entire life at their Coventry plant. Sold to the private "Shropshire Collection", Shrewsbury, sold and restored again in 2003
1724	77	1927	W6	0-4-0ST	4 ft 8 1/2 in (1,435 mm)	Scrapped	1959		Built for the Manchester Ship Canal.
1730	Gabriel	1925		4-4-0T	3 ft 6 in (1,067 mm)	Preserved	Bay of Islands Vintage Railway, Kawakawa, New Zealand		One of five similar 4-4-0T engines: 2xSchull and Skibbereen Railway, Ireland, named Allen and Gabriel (after Mount Gabriel); 2xSarawak, Borneo, named Bintang and Bulang (moon & star in Malay language). Sarawak ordered third engine in 1915, to be named Mata Hari (eye of the day, or midday), but due to decline in teak trade post World War I cancelled. Regauged in 1926 to 3 ft 6 in (1,067 mm), sold to Portland Cement, Whangarei, New Zealand. Given to Bay of Islands Scenic Railway in 1985
1731		July 1927	W6	0-4-0ST	3 ft 6 in (1,067 mm)	Preserved	Sandstone Estates, South Africa		Built for Newcastle Steel Works, it ended working at Union Steel Corporation's Klip Works, Vereeniging, South Africa
1732	Coppice	1927		0-6-0ST		Scrapped			Built for Shipley Colliery Ltd, Derbyshire. Worksplate offered at Auction, November 2024
1734	Thurwit	July 1927	R2	0-4-0ST	4 ft 8 1/2 in (1,435 mm)	Scrapped			Built for Thurrock Chalk and Whiting of Purfleet, Essex.
1736		1927	W6	0-4-0ST	4 ft 8 1/2 in (1,435 mm)	Scrapped			
1738	No 4	1928	W5	0-4-0ST	4 ft 8 1/2 in (1,435 mm)	Preserved			Supplied new to Birmingham Electricity Authority, Hams Hall Power Station, near Coleshill, where it was loco No 4. Resident on the SVR between 1968 and 1995 when privately owned by SVR member Mr J McNally but saw very little eventually going to the South Devon Railway. Later again was resold, this time going to Titley Junction, Herefordshire. The loco masquerades as the Thomas the Tank Engine character 'Percy' and has visited several preserved railways at Thomas events.
1739		1928		0-4-0ST	4 ft 8 1/2 in (1,435 mm)	Scrapped	1965		Co-operative Wholesale Society, Silverton, Essex. Sold to Thos. W. Ward (Shipbreaking), Inverkeithing, Fife in 1949.
1740		1927	W6	0-4-0ST	4 ft 8 1/2 in (1,435 mm)	Scrapped			Built for BPCM Johnson's Branch, Greenhithe. Acquired November 1963 by Frindsbury Cement Works. Transferred to APCM Holborough Works, Snodland, circa 1963
1742	Greenhithe	1927	W6	0-4-0ST	4 ft 8 1/2 in (1,435 mm)	Scrapped			Built for BPCM Greenhithe, Kent
1745	Coventry No 4	1927		0-6-0ST	4 ft 8 1/2 in (1,435 mm)				Arley colliery
1746		1928	W6	0-4-0ST	4 ft 8 1/2 in (1,435 mm)	Scrapped			Built for BPCM Johnson's Branch, Greenhithe. Acquired August 1960 by Frindsbury Cement Works. Transferred to Thurrock Chalk & Whiting Co. Ltd., Essex, June 1964
1747	Longfield	1928	W6	0-4-0ST	4 ft 8 1/2 in (1,435 mm)	Scrapped			Built for APCM Holborough Quarry, Snodland. Lent to Frindsbury Cement Works for period in 1962
1749				0-4-0ST	4 ft 8 1/2 in (1,435 mm)	Preserved	Lincolnshire Wolds Railway, Grimsby		Spent its working life at Cawdor Quarry, Matlock in Derbyshire. Was rescued by Brian Roberts, of Tollerton, Nottinghamshire, who named it Ffiona Jane after his daughter. He sold it in 1979 to Pete Clark who named it 'Fulstow' after the village where he lives in Lincolnshire. It now works on the Lincolnshire Wolds Railway, where it has recently undergone its first ten-yearly overhaul.
1750–1751		February 1928	M5	0-6-2T	2 ft 6 in (762 mm)	Scrapped			A pair supplied to the Anglo-Persian Oil Company for the Abadan oil depot. Named D.I.K. 1928 and D.I.K. 1929
1756	Hornpipe	1928	R2	0-4-0ST		Preserved	Private site, Fifield, Berkshire		Built for the Holborough Cement Co., Snodland, Kent. Moved to Quainton Railway Society in 1972
1759	Elizabeth	1928	R2	0-4-0ST	4 ft 8 1/2 in (1,435 mm)	Preserved	Rutland Railway Museum		Delivered new to Enderby Quarry, later worked at Mountsorrel Quarry
1787	Newdigate No. 4	May 1933	X2	0-6-0ST	4 ft 8 1/2 in (1,435 mm)	Scrapped			Built for Newdigate Colliery, nr Bedworth, Warwickshire
1788	Kilmersdon	September 1929	R3	0-4-0ST	4 ft 8 1/2 in (1,435 mm)	Preserved	Somerset & Dorset Railway Heritage Trust		Worked entire life at Kilmersdon Colliery, now named after location
1789	Nostell No 4	1929	R3	0-4-0ST	4 ft 8 1/2 in (1,435 mm)	Scrapped			Used at NCB Nostell West Yorkshire. This locomotive was registered by the Railway Executive and a cast iron Locomotive Registration Plate from it, No 151 dated 1952, survives and was offered at Auction May 2025
1790	Olive	1935	W6	0-4-0ST	4 ft 8 1/2 in (1,435 mm)	Scrapped	1964		Built for the Co-operative Wholesale Society, Shilbottle Colliery, Northumberland, passing to National Coal Board in 1947.
1803		1933	W6	0-4-0ST	4 ft 8 1/2 in (1,435 mm)	Preserved, static exhibit	Foxfield Light Railway, Staffordshire		Built for Ironbridge Power Station, sold into preservation in July 1980
1812	No 4 'Windsor'	September 1930		0-4-0ST	2 ft 6 in (762 mm)	Scrapped	by Cashmores, Gt Bridge (March 1968)		New to Windsor Street Gas Works, Birmingham
1816	D.I.K. 1930	October 1930	M5	0-6-2T	2 ft 6 in (762 mm)	Scrapped			Follow-on order from 1750
1823		1931	R4	0-4-0		Scrapped	1972		Ex Shardlow & Co Sheffield. Went into preservation in 1967 at Chasewater (Private purchase) but scrapped at the same time as Lance (1038/1906)
1824	No. 6	1931		0-8-0		Scrapped			Largest locomotive ever produced by Peckett. Oil burning, operated on Christmas Island hauling phosphate trains
1827–1829		1931	B3	0-6-0ST	3 ft 6 in (1,067 mm)				Cleveland Bridge Engineering, Mozambique
1835		1934		0-4-0ST					Cheltanham gas works
1837		1931		0-4-0ST					Beckton gas works No 37
1841–1851		1932	1682	0-4-0ST	3 ft (914 mm)	Scrapped			Built for the Public Works Department, Singapore
1853		1934	R4	0-4-0ST					Barnsley Gas Company
1854	No 1 'Coronation'	February 1932		0-4-0ST	2 ft 6 in (762 mm)	Scrapped	by Cashmores, Gt Bridge (March 1968)		New to Windsor Street Gas Works, Birmingham, disposed of to Foleshill Gas Works, Coventry.
1859	Sir Gomer	June 1932	OX1	0-6-0ST		Preserved	Battlefield Line Railway, Leicestershire		Worked at Mountain Ash Colliery, South Wales
1860	Cefn Coed No 1			0-6-0ST	4 ft 8 1/2 in (1,435 mm)	Scrapped			Built for the South Wales Coalfield, worked at Brynlliw Colliery. Later at Amalgamated Anthracite, Cefn Coed colliery, Glamorgan
1865–1866		1932	1682	0-4-0ST	3 ft (914 mm)	Scrapped			Built for the Public Works Department, Singapore
1868	Norbury	1934		0-4-2	2 ft 6 in (762 mm)				Chattenden & Upnor Railway, Kent
1870		September 1934	M7	0-6-0ST	1,000 mm (3 ft 3 3/8 in)	Preserved	Irchester Narrow Gauge Railway Museum, Northamptonshire		Built for the metre gauge Finedon quarry system, numbered No. 85
1871		September 1934	M7	0-6-0ST	1,000 mm (3 ft 3 3/8 in)	Preserved	Irchester Narrow Gauge Railway Museum, Northamptonshire		Built for the metre gauge Finedon quarry system, numbered No. 86
1874		1936		0-4-0ST					Vauxhall motors, Luton
1877	Westbury	1934	FA	0-6-0ST		Scrapped	March 1966 by Godfrey & Sully of Portishead		Built for the Port of Bristol Authority. Worked at Avonmouth Docks. 2 No 8" x 6" negatives of this locomotive survive in the Peckett & Co. Archive held by the National Railway Museum
1878	Ashton	1934	FA	0-6-0ST		Scrapped	March 1966 by Godfrey & Sully of Portishead		Built for the Port of Bristol Authority. Worked at Avonmouth Docks.
1880		May 1935	R4	0-4-0ST		Scrapped			Built for Empire Paper Mills, Kent
1889	Menelaus	December 1935	B3	0-6-0ST	4 ft 8 1/2 in (1,435 mm)	Preserved	Caledonian Railway, Brechin		Built for Cwm Colliery, South Wales.
1891	Manvers Main No. 12	1940	X2	0-6-0ST	4 ft 8 1/2 in (1,435 mm)	Scrapped			
1892		1934	OY	0-4-0ST					Courtaulds, Greenfield works, Flint
1893		1933	W6	0-4-0ST	4 ft 8 1/2 in (1,435 mm)	Preserved	Coleford Great Western Railway Museum		Built for Ironbridge Power Station, transferred to Birch Hills Power Station in 1951, then in 1958 to Stourport-on-Severn Power Station where its cab was cut down. Sold to JC Bamford in 1977 for use at their Titanic Steamship Co. near Ashbourne, Derbyshire. Sold into preservation in 1980, it arrived in Coleford in 1986
1894	Grace	1936		0-4-0ST	4 ft 8 1/2 in (1,435 mm)				OxfordShire Ironstone Company
1895		1935	Y	0-4-0ST					Barrow Haematite Steel, Barrow in Furness
1897		1936		0-4-0ST					Walsall gas works
1900		1935		0-4-0T	4 ft 8 1/2 in (1,435 mm)	Preserved	Buckinghamshire Railway Centre		Built at a cost of £860 for the tight loading gauge restrictions of the Courtaulds system at Holywell Junction, Flint, it is only 5 feet 9 inches (1.75 m) tall, and often referred to as the "Flying Bufferbeam". The site was split in two by the LMS Chester to Holyhead railway, being linked by a short and steep incline access tunnel. The loco would shunt wagons of waste, from the Rayon fibre plant, to the sea wall where it was dumped. To enable the operation, the loco would work flat out down one incline to make it up the other side. Eventually, safety concerns meant that in 1954 the operation was replaced by a rope-incline and two diesel locomotives. After a works overhaul, she moved to the construction of Courtaulds' Grimsby plant, but on start of plant operations was replaced by a Sentinel, and kept as a spare. Sold into private preservation, it arrived at Buckingham in September 1971
1903		1936	M5	0-4-0ST	4 ft 8 1/2 in (1,435 mm)	Preserved	Chatham Historic Dockyard, Kent		Built for the South Wales Public Wharf & Transit Company, Penarth
1908	Ford No. 6	June 1937	R4	0-4-0ST	4 ft 8 1/2 in (1,435 mm)	Scrapped			Built for Ford of Britain's internal railway network at their Dagenham, Essex, plant
1909	D.I.K. 1936	October 1936	M5	0-6-2T	2 ft 6 in (762 mm)	Scrapped			Follow-on order from 1750
1920	Coronation	1936	B3	0-6-0ST		Scrapped			Built for Tunnel Cement works, Purfleet, Essex.
1925	Caliban	February 1937	OY	0-4-0ST	4 ft 8 1/2 in (1,435 mm)	Preserved	Ribble Steam Railway, Preston, Lancashire		Built for Courtaulds, Preston
1935	Hornet	November 1937	W6-S	0-4-0ST	4 ft 8 1/2 in (1,435 mm)	Preserved	Ribble Steam Railway, Preston, Lancashire		Built for Black Park Colliery Co. Ltd., Denbigshire, Wales. Delivered by the LMS to Chirk. Ended life at Bersham Colliery, Wrexham, Wales.
1940	Henbury	December 1937	FA	0-6-0ST	4 ft 8 1/2 in (1,435 mm)	Preserved	Bristol Harbour Railway		Built for the Port of Bristol Authority. Worked at Avonmouth Docks, where she worked all her life. Fitted with ‘Mackenzie’s boiler in 1960, at the same time gaining the distinctive curved smokebox front similar to ‘Ashton’. The cab and tank fronts were lined out at the same time. Departed Avonmouth for Radstock in November 1971 Owned by Bristol City Council.
1943	Sir Charles			0-6-0ST	4 ft 8 1/2 in (1,435 mm)				Oxfordshire Ironstone Company
1948		1938		0-4-0ST	4 ft 8 1/2 in (1,435 mm)	Scrapped			Built for Parkhouse Colliery
1950	Bradley	February 1938	R4	0-4-0ST	4 ft 8 1/2 in (1,435 mm)	Scrapped			Built for Northfleet Deep Water Wharf & Storage Company, Kent.
1952–1955		1938	OX2	0-6-0ST	4 ft 8 1/2 in (1,435 mm)	Scrapped			Built for the Port of Tyne Authority (Nos.21–24). Locomotive #1952 sold to Eastwell & Waltham Ironstone Co., Leicestershire in 1956, others scrapped in 1958–59.
1957		1938	R2	0-4-2T	3 ft 6 in (1,067 mm)	Preserved	Goldfields Railway, Waihi, New Zealand		One of three 0-4-2T's built for Wilsons (NZ) Portland Cement Ltd. (now Golden Bay Cement Co. Ltd.), for use at their Portland Cement Works south of Whangarei
1960		November 1938	W7	0-4-0ST		Scrapped			Built for Brown Bayley's Steel Works, Sheffield
1963		1938		0-4-0ST	4 ft 8 1/2 in (1,435 mm)	Preserved	Bere Ferrers, Devon		
1964	Cordie	1940	M5	0-4-0ST	4 ft 8 1/2 in (1,435 mm)				Murgatroyd Salt, Middlewich
1965	Philip E. Holden	1939	B3	0-6-0ST	4 ft 8 1/2 in (1,435 mm)	Scrapped			Worked at Onllwyn Coal Washery
1966		1939	R2-S	0-4-0ST	4 ft 8 1/2 in (1,435 mm)	Scrapped	February 1957		Built for Beckton Works of the Gas, Light & Coke Company
1967	Merlin (Myrddin)	April 1939	W6-S	0-4-0ST	4 ft 8 1/2 in (1,435 mm)	Preserved	Aln Valley Railway		Built for Brown Bayley's Steel Works, Sheffield.
1970	Jackie Milburn (1924–1988)	1939	OX1	0-6-0ST	4 ft 8 1/2 in (1,435 mm)	Preserved	North Tyneside Steam Railway		Built for the Ashington Coal Company to work at Ashington Colliery, together with twin 1971. Given the name Ashington No. 5, sold by the National Coal Board in 1969 after Ashington was dieselised, to North Norfolk Railway. Returned to Northumberland in 1991, repainted into "as delivered to Ashington Colliery" livery and named after Jackie Milburn
1971	Ashington No. 6	1939	OX1	0-6-0ST	4 ft 8 1/2 in (1,435 mm)	Scrapped	1968		Built for Ashington Coal Company for Ashington Colliery, together with twin 1970. Passed to National Coal Board in 1947 and used at Ashington, Newbiggin and Pegswood collieries.
1978	Allenby	1939	W7	0-4-0ST	4 ft 8 1/2 in (1,435 mm)				Royal Arsenal, Woolwhich
1979–80		1939		0-4-0ST	4 ft 8 1/2 in (1,435 mm)				Ashington coal Company. named Ashington No 5 and 6 respectively
1982		1940		0-4-0ST	4 ft 8 1/2 in (1,435 mm)				Coventry powerstation
1985	Alexander	1940	W6	0-4-0ST	4 ft 8 1/2 in (1,435 mm)	Scrapped			Built for Royal Arsenal, Woolwich.
1990		October 1940	W6	0-4-0ST	4 ft 8 1/2 in (1,435 mm)	Preserved, static exhibit	Telford Steam Railway		Built for Ironbridge Power Station, sold into preservation in July 1980
1996	Czecho	1941		0-4-2	4 ft 8 1/2 in (1,435 mm)				Hadfields, Sheffield
1998		1941		0-4-0ST	4 ft 8 1/2 in (1,435 mm)	Scrapped	1969		Chesterfield Tube Co., Derbyshire. Sold to Culter Paper Mills, Peterculter, Aberdeenshire in 1954.
1999		1941		0-4-0ST	4 ft 8 1/2 in (1,435 mm)	Preserved	Ribble Steam Railway, Preston, Lancashire		Built for Southport Gas Company, transferred in 1958 to Darwen Gas Works, named North Western Gas Board. Replaced by diesel in 1963, moved to the Keighley and Worth Valley Railway in September 1966. This loco featured in the 1970 movie The Virgin and the Gypsy, and was filmed working a train at Cromford on BR metals.
2000		December 1942	B3	0-6-0ST	4 ft 8 1/2 in (1,435 mm)	Preserved	Beamish Museum		Worked at the British Sugar Corporation, Ipswich. Privately owned and usually based at Barrow Hill Engine Shed, Derbyshire. Currently (2019) on loan to Beamish Museum.
2003		May 1941	W7	0-4-0ST	4 ft 8 1/2 in (1,435 mm)	Preserved	Middleton Railway, Leeds, West Yorkshire		Built for the Ministry of Supply for use at Swynnerton Royal Ordnance factory. Moved to ROF Salwick, then UK Atomic Energy Authority and finally BNFL. Preserved at Middleton from 1972, was in use for 18 years
2004		1942	W7	0-4-0ST	4 ft 8 1/2 in (1,435 mm)	Preserved	Tyseley Locomotive Works, Birmingham		
2010		March 1941	Yorktown	0-4-0ST	4 ft 8 1/2 in (1,435 mm)	scrapped			One of a batch of six ‘Yorktown’ class 0-4-0STs (Nos. 2010–2015) built for the Ministry of Supply's Royal Ordnance Factories (ROF) during the Second World War.
2011		March 1941	Yorktown	0-4-0ST	4 ft 8 1/2 in (1,435 mm)	scrapped			One of a batch of six ‘Yorktown’ class 0-4-0STs (Nos. 2010–2015) built for the Ministry of Supply's Royal Ordnance Factories (ROF) during the Second World War.
2012	Teddy	March 1941	Yorktown	0-4-0ST	4 ft 8 1/2 in (1,435 mm)	Preserved	Chasewater Railway		One of a batch of six ‘Yorktown’ class 0-4-0STs (Nos. 2010–2015) built for the Ministry of Supply's Royal Ordnance Factories (ROF) during the Second World War. Some of the smallest standard gauge steam locomotives ever built in Britain, featuring 7 in x 12 in cylinders, 2 ft diameter wheels, and weighing a little over 11 tons No. 2012 went new to the ROF at Creekmoor, near Poole in Dorset, which built Hispano guns for aircraft. By late 1944 it had been transferred to ROF Llanishen, near Cardiff, (which also had No 2013). In 1959 No. 2012 was sold to dealer, J W Hardwick & Sons, in Surrey and stood in Hardwick's West Ewell yard until acquired by Bill Lees of Godalming in 1967. Sold in 1972 to Rev E R 'Teddy' Boston, and moved initially to Market Bosworth Light Railway at Shackerstone and restored by members of the Lutterworth Railway Society and given the name 'Herbert'. Moved to Teddy Boston's Cadeby Light Railway in July 1982 and displayed until closure in 2005, Restored and put back into steam in 2007 running at the Lavender Line, where it was rename ‘Teddy’ after its famous former owner. Sold in 2011 to its current owner on hire to the National Railway Museum at York, visiting Beamish Museum until 2014. Moved to Chasewater in February 2015 Boiler certificate expired in November 2017 - currently awaiting overhaul.
2013		March 1941	Yorktown	0-4-0ST	4 ft 8 1/2 in (1,435 mm)	scrapped	c1959		One of a batch of six ‘Yorktown’ class 0-4-0STs (Nos. 2010–2015) built for the Ministry of Supply's Royal Ordnance Factories (ROF) during the Second World War. worked at ROF Llanishen, near Cardiff, (where it was joined by No 2012 by late 1944) The factory employed over 20,000 people manufacturing field guns and other weaponry for the war effort, and both locomotives were kept busy moving supplies and completed munitions around the site, or running between the GWR exchange siding at Birchgrove. After the end of hostilities the two locos were used less and less.
2014		March 1941	Yorktown	0-4-0ST	4 ft 8 1/2 in (1,435 mm)	scrapped			One of a batch of six ‘Yorktown’ class 0-4-0STs (Nos. 2010–2015) built for the Ministry of Supply's Royal Ordnance Factories (ROF) during the Second World War.
2015		March 1941	Yorktown	0-4-0ST	4 ft 8 1/2 in (1,435 mm)	scrapped			One of a batch of six ‘Yorktown’ class 0-4-0STs (Nos. 2010–2015) built for the Ministry of Supply's Royal Ordnance Factories (ROF) during the Second World War.
2023		1941	OX1	0-6-0ST	4 ft 8 1/2 in (1,435 mm)	Scrapped	1968		Built for Ashington Coal Co., Northumberland (No. 8). Passed to National Coal Board in 1947 and used at Ashington and Newbiggin collieries.
2024	Karen	1942		0-4-2T	2 ft (610 mm)	Preserved	Welsh Highland Heritage Railway, Porthmadog, Wales		One of three built for the Rhodesia Chrome Mines Ltd Selukwe Peak Light Railway. Brought back to the UK in 1972
2027	"Irlam"	1942		0-4-0ST	4 ft 8 1/2 in (1,435 mm)	Preserved	Static display Irlam Station		Bought new for the Ministry of Supply for dispatch to the Royal Ordnance Factory at Sellafield, Cumbria. In the 1980s it was moved to Carnforth Steamtown Railway Museum and stripped down for boiler repairs. Purchased in July 2019 by the Hamilton Davies Trust due to it being similar to the Peckett locomotives used by the CWS Soap & Candle Works, renamed and restored to form part of the railway display at Irlam Station.
2028		1942		0-4-0T		Scrapped	1971		Built for the Royal Ordnance Factory, Sellafield, Cumbria. Then operated by the Harbour Commissioners for Whitehaven harbour.
2029		1942	R4-S	0-6-0T	1,000 mm (3 ft 3 3/8 in)	Preserved	Irchester Narrow Gauge Railway Museum		Built for the Wellingborough Iron Co Ltd
2030	Sellafield No.3	1942		0-4-0ST		Scrapped	9/1973		Delivered new to ROF Sellafield 1942, moved to ROF Pembrey by 1952, sold to the 'Pencoed Trading Co' in 1954 where it worked in a colliery timber yard at Wern Tarw. Scrapped at Wern Tarw, South Wales 9/1973
2031	Ashley	1942	M5	0-4-0ST		Preserved, static exhibit	South Devon Railway, Buckfastleigh		Exeter Gas Works until 1969, then moved to Buckfastleigh, arriving on 23 September 1969 and named. Worksplate offered at auction June 2025.
2032		1942		0-4-0ST	4 ft 8 1/2 in (1,435 mm)				Foleshill colliery No 20
2035	Hallen	1943	FA	0-6-0ST					Built for the Port of Bristol Authority. Worked at Avonmouth Docks. Vacuum fitted to work passenger trains. Sold to South Western Gas Co., Cheltenham Gasworks in September 1964
2036	Bristol	April 1943	FA	0-6-0ST	4 ft 8 1/2 in (1,435 mm)	Scrapped	March 1966 by Godfrey & Sully of Portishead.		Batch of three built for the Port of Bristol Authority. Vacuum fitted to work passenger trains. Worked at Avonmouth Docks.
2037	Clifton	April 1943	FA	0-6-0ST	4 ft 8 1/2 in (1,435 mm)	Scrapped	March 1966 by Godfrey & Sully of Portishead		Batch of three built for the Port of Bristol Authority. Vacuum fitted to work passenger train. Worked at Avonmouth Docks.
2038	Redland	April 1943	FA	0-6-0ST	4 ft 8 1/2 in (1,435 mm)	Scrapped	March 1966 by Godfrey & Sully of Portishead.		Batch of three built for the Port of Bristol Authority. Vacuum fitted to work passenger train. Worked at Avonmouth Docks.
2039	Jeffrey	1943	M5	0-4-0ST	4 ft 8 1/2 in (1,435 mm)	Preserved, static exhibit	East Anglian Railway Museum, Essex		Last worked 1962 at the Glenwydd Iron Foundry, Ironbridge. Stored at Triad, Bishops Stortford, before arrival at Chappel in June 1981. Motion overhauled, but boiler needs a heavy repair before the locomotive could be steamed
2041		1943		0-4-0ST	4 ft 8 1/2 in (1,435 mm)	Scrapped	c.1959		ROF Kirkby. Subsequently, sold to North British Locomotive Co., Hyde Park Works, Glasgow.
2046		1943	R4	0-4-0ST	4 ft 8 1/2 in (1,435 mm)				Fort Dunlop No 7 Supplied to Metal & Produce Recovery Depot Morris Cowley Oxfordshire. Oval worksplate auctioned June 2024
2047		1943		0-4-0ST		Preserved	Dorrigo Steam Railway and Museum, Dorrigo, Australia		Built for the Tubemakers of Australia, named Corby.
2049	General	1944		0-4-0ST		Scrapped			William Doxford & Sons Ltd, Sunderland
2050		1944		0-6-0ST	2 ft (610 mm)	preserved			Harrogate Gasworks Railway, now at Statfold Barn Railway
2052	Norman	1944		0-4-0ST	4 ft 8 1/2 in (1,435 mm)				Northampton gas works
2053		1944		0-4-0ST	4 ft 8 1/2 in (1,435 mm)	Scrapped	c.1956		Built for ICI Nobel Division, Ardeer, Ayrshire
2054	Richard	1944	OY	0-4-0ST	4 ft 8 1/2 in (1,435 mm)	Scrapped			Built for Bedlington Coal Co., Northumberland. Passed to National Coal Board in 1947 and used at Bedlington and Whittle collieries.
2058	No 3 (Greenhithe)	1943		0-4-0ST	4 ft 8 1/2 in (1,435 mm)				Windsor Street Gas Works, Birmingham.
2061		1945	B3	0-6-0ST	4 ft 8 1/2 in (1,435 mm)	Scrapped			Built for Merthyr Vale Colliery, South Wales
2070		1945		0-4-0ST	4 ft 8 1/2 in (1,435 mm)	Scrapped	by Cashmores		New to Saltley Gas Works Birmingham
2071		1945		0-4-0ST	4 ft 8 1/2 in (1,435 mm)	Scrapped			Built for Ministry of Supply, ROF Irvine, Ayrshire
2072		1945		0-4-0ST	4 ft 8 1/2 in (1,435 mm)	Scrapped			Built for Ministry of Supply, Orbiston Depot, Motherwell, Lanarkshire. Subsequently, used at ROF Sellafield, Cumbria
2076		1946	OY	0-4-0ST	4 ft 8 1/2 in (1,435 mm)	Scrapped	1968		Built for Bedlington Coal Co., Northumberland. Passed to National Coal Board in 1947 and used at Bedlington Colliery.
2080	Northfleet	October 1946	R4	0-4-0ST	4 ft 8 1/2 in (1,435 mm)	Scrapped			Built for the Northfleet Deep Water Wharf & Storage Company, Kent.
2081		December 1946	OY-S	0-4-0ST	4 ft 8 1/2 in (1,435 mm)	Preserved	Foxfield Light Railway, Staffordshire		Built for Nechells Gas Works of the City of Birmingham Gas Department. A variant design to cope with tight curves, the locomotive has a short wheelbase for an OY, a lowered cab floor and roof, and a shorter saddletank and dome. Transferred in 1965 to Swan Village Works in Walsall, it was transferred into preservation on 17 August 1969
2084	F.C. Tingey	February 1948	OY1-S	0-4-0ST	4 ft 8 1/2 in (1,435 mm)	Preserved	Stainmore Railway Company, Kirkby Stephen East, Cumbria		Built for Courtaulds, Flint, Flintshire, North Wales. Donated to the Llangollen Railway, but sold via a scrap merchant to Steamtown Carnforth where it was restored. Moved to Kirkby Stephen East in 2000, spent three years at the Caledonian Railway (Brechin), now back at Stainmore Railway Company. Currently in South Durham and Lancashire Union Railway livery.
2085		1948	OY1-S	0-4-0ST	4 ft 8 1/2 in (1,435 mm)	Preserved	Pallot Heritage Steam Museum, Jersey		Built for Courtaulds Aber works, Flint, Flintshire, North Wales
2086		1948	OY-1	0-4-0ST	4 ft 8 1/2 in (1,435 mm)	Scrapped			Built as one of a batch of four for Courtaulds Aber works, Flint, Flintshire, North Wales. Scrapped at their Red Scar plant, Preston, becoming a parts donor for sister 2087
2087		1948	OY-1	0-4-0ST	4 ft 8 1/2 in (1,435 mm)	Preserved and Active	East Kent Railway		Originally named Dafydd, built as one of a batch of four for Courtaulds Aber works, Flint, Flintshire, North Wales. Transferred to Wolverhampton, where it lost the name, then Red Scar plant, Preston. Rebuilt with parts from scrapped sister engine No. 2086, renamed Achilles it worked there until replacement by diesel in 1968
2092	VICTORY	1947	W7	0-4-0ST					Delivered new to Bolsover Colliery Mansfield, Notts. Nameplate VICTORY survives - sold at auction Nov 2022
2094		1948	OY1	0-4-0ST	4 ft 8 1/2 in (1,435 mm)				Briton Ferry Steel, Glamorgan
2100	William Murdoch	1949	R4	0-4-0ST	4 ft 8 1/2 in (1,435 mm)	Preserved	Helston Railway		Worked at the Southern Gas Board's Blackwater Gas Works and Hilsea Gas Works.
2101		1949	RH	0-4-2ST	3 ft 6 in (1,067 mm)	Scrapped			Built for the Rhodesian Iron and Steel Company, Bulawayo, Rhodesia
2103		1948	R4-S	0-4-0ST		Preserved	Middleton Railway		R4-S was a special batch built for the Central Electricity Generating Board, with a loading gauge of 9 feet 10 inches (3.00 m) over the standard 10 feet 8.5 inches (3.264 m). Fitted with a low cab roof. Delivered in 1952 to Croydon Power Station "B", it was joined by 2104 and 2105
2104		1948	R4-S	0-4-0ST	4 ft 8 1/2 in (1,435 mm)	Preserved	Northampton & Lamport Railway		R4-S was a special batch built for the Central Electricity Generating Board, with a loading gauge of 9 feet 10 inches (3.00 m) over the standard 10 feet 8.5 inches (3.264 m). Delivered in 1952 to Croydon Power Station "B", it was joined by 2103 and 2105. Replaced by diesels in the late 1960s, 2104 and 2105 were set aside as spares until 1972, when they were sold off
2105		1948	R4-S	0-4-0ST	4 ft 8 1/2 in (1,435 mm)	Preserved	Buckinghamshire Railway Centre		R4-S was a special batch built for the Central Electricity Generating Board, with a loading gauge of 9 feet 10 inches (3.00 m) over the standard 10 feet 8.5 inches (3.264 m). Delivered in 1952 to Croydon Power Station "A", it was quickly transferred to the "B" unit. Here it joined 2013 and 2104. Replaced by diesels in the late 1960s, 2104 and 2105 were set aside as spares until 1972, when they were sold off. The loco arrived at Buckinghamshire on 14 December 1972
2106		1949		0-6-0ST	600 mm (1 ft 11 5/8 in)				Sena Sugar, Mozambique
2108		January 1950	E1	0-4-0ST	4 ft 8 1/2 in (1,435 mm)	Scrapped			Built for National Coal Board Darfield Main Colliery
2110		1950	W7	0-4-0ST	4 ft 8 1/2 in (1,435 mm)	Stored, unrestored	Royal Deeside Railway		Bought new by the National Coal Board for the Nottinghamshire Coalfield and named as Welbeck No. 6
2111	Lytham	1949		0-4-0ST	4 ft 8 1/2 in (1,435 mm)	Preserved	Midland Railway Centre, Butterley, Derbyshire		Returned to service in 2018.
2112		1949	R4	0-4-0ST	4 ft 8 1/2 in (1,435 mm)	Scrapped	1970		Built for brewery of Truman, Hanbury and Buxton, Burton upon Trent in 1949. Initially, she would have shared duties with an earlier Peckett R2 class, works no. 1585 of 1922 and later, from 1954, with Peckett works no. 2136. Sold to J. C. Staton & Co. Ltd., Tutbury, Staffordshire, in March 1958. Taken over by British Gypsum, moved to their Hawton Works in April 1969
2114		December 1950	B3	0-6-0ST	4 ft 8 1/2 in (1,435 mm)	Preserved	Kidwelly Industrial Museum, Carmarthenshire, West Wales		Built for Brynlliw Colliery, South Wales. Then worked Cefn Coed Colliery and Morlais Colliery before preservation
2116	Albion No. 12	1950	OY1	0-4-0ST		Scrapped	1967		Delivered new to Albion Works, Briton Ferry. Nameplate ALBION No 12 survives - sold at auction Nov 2022.
2119		1950		0-4-0ST					One of several steam locomotives to have worked at Stewart & Lloyds factory. Located at Bomford Bridge. Replaced in the 1960s by diesel shunters.
2120		1950		0-4-0ST	4 ft 8 1/2 in (1,435 mm)	Scrapped			Built for Edward Collins & Sons Ltd., Kelvindale Paper Mills, Glasgow
2121–2122		1951		0-6-0ST	4 ft 8 1/2 in (1,435 mm)	Scrapped			Batch of two locomotives built for Egyptian Engineering Stores, for use at a sugar refinery
2124		June 1951	OQ	0-6-0ST	4 ft 8 1/2 in (1,435 mm)	Scrapped			Worked entire life at Tower Colliery, South Wales
2125–2127		1951		0-4-0T	2 ft (610 mm)	Scrapped			Batch of three locomotives built for Mason & Barry for use in Portugal
2128		1951	R4	0-4-0ST					Dibles Wharf, Southampton
2129	Kestrel	1952	R4	0-4-0ST	4 ft 8 1/2 in (1,435 mm)	Preserved	Pallot Heritage Steam Museum, Jersey		Built for Crane Ltd of Ipswich, Suffolk. Sold into preservation in 1981 to Mr. Brian Roberts of Hill Farm, Tollerton, Nottinghamshire. He sold it on in the late 1980s to Pallot Heritage Museum, Jersey.
2130		1952	W7	0-4-0ST	4 ft 8 1/2 in (1,435 mm)	Preserved	Northampton and Lamport Railway		Built as a pair with 2131 for CWS soapworks, Irlam. After line closed, sold in 1966 to Fort Dunlop, Birmingham. Sold to Mr. A. Hunt for preservation, moved to his mineral water factory, Hinckley. Arrived Shackerstone on 7 December 1974. Returned to steam January 2016
2131	Oliver Veltom	1952	W7	0-4-0ST	4 ft 8 1/2 in (1,435 mm)	Preserved	Cambrian Heritage Railways, Oswestry, Shropshire		Identical to 2130. Built for CWS soapworks, Irlam. After line closed, sold in 1966 to Fort Dunlop, Birmingham. Sold to Mr. A. Hunt for preservation, moved to his mineral water factory, Hinckley. Named in honour of former British Railways Oswestry Area Manager
2133–2134		November 1952		0-6-0	3 ft (914 mm)				Batch of two locomotives built for Nizam Sugar Factory, Nizamabad, India
2136		1954	R4	0-4-0ST		Scrapped			Built for brewery of Truman, Hanbury and Buxton, Burton upon Trent
2141		February 1954		0-6-0T	3 ft 6 in (1,067 mm)	Preserved	Sandstone Estates, South Africa		Built as a 3 ft (914 mm) for Sena Sugar Estates, and shipped to Chinde, Portuguese East Africa on 16 February 1954. Regauged when the line was connected to the main CFM network, it became Sena No. 6. The system closed during the Mozambique civil war, it was shipped to Sandstone together with sister loco 2165, three narrow gauge Pecketts, a number of Baguley-Drewry diesel locos, and other equipment.
2142	Northern Gas Board No. 1	1953	W7 (special)	0-4-0ST		Preserved	Darlington Railway Preservation Society, Darlington		Built for Northern Gas Board, St Anthony's Gasworks, Newcastle upon Tyne. The gasworks engine also shunted the adjacent tar works of Thomas Ness Ltd. (a National Coal Board subsidiary), which firm took over operation of the locomotive in 1967.
2143	Sena No. 11	January 1953		0-6-0ST	2 ft (610 mm)	Preserved	Sandstone Estates, South Africa		Built for Sena Sugar Estates, and shipped to Chinde, Portuguese East Africa on 16 February 1954. The system closed during the Mozambique civil war, it was shipped to Sandstone together with 2141, 2165, two narrow gauge sister Pecketts, a number of Baguley-Drewry diesel locos, and other equipment.
2144	Sena No. 12	January 1953		0-6-0ST	2 ft (610 mm)	Preserved	United States		Built for Sena Sugar Estates, and shipped to Chinde, Portuguese East Africa on 16 February 1954. The system closed during the Mozambique civil war, it was purchased by a private buyer and shipped to the USA
2145	Sena No. 13	January 1953		0-6-0ST	2 ft (610 mm)	Preserved	Sandstone Estates, South Africa		Built for Sena Sugar Estates, and shipped to Chinde, Portuguese East Africa on 16 February 1954. The system closed during the Mozambique civil war, it was shipped to Sandstone together with 2141, 2165, two narrow gauge sister Pecketts, a number of Baguley-Drewry diesel locos, and other equipment.
2147	Uskmouth 1	June 1952		0-4-0ST		Preserved	Dean Forest Railway, Gloucestershire		Built for the CEGB for use at Uskmouth power station.
2148	Uskmouth 2	June 1952		0-4-0ST		Scrapped			Built for the CEGB for use at Uskmouth power station.
2150	Mardy Monster	June 1954	OQ	0-6-0ST	4 ft 8 1/2 in (1,435 mm)	Preserved	Elsecar Heritage Railway		Most powerful industrial steam locomotive built in the United Kingdom. Worked entire life at Mardy Colliery, South Wales
2151	Mardy No. 2	June 1954	OQ	0-6-0ST	4 ft 8 1/2 in (1,435 mm)	Scrapped			Worked entire life at Mardy Colliery, South Wales
2153		1954	OX4	0-6-0ST	4 ft 8 1/2 in (1,435 mm)	Preserved	Caledonian Railway, Brechin		Built for Birchenwood Gas and Coke works, where she spent her entire career. Retired on 19 May 1973
2155		1955		0-4-0F	4 ft 8 1/2 in (1,435 mm)	Preserved, static exhibit			The only fireless locomotive to ever be produced at Atlas Works. Worked entire life at CWS soapworks, Irlam. Placed up for sale from 1960. When the soap works closed in 1969, it was presented for static display in the George Thomas Recreation Ground and subsequently became known as Thomas. When likely to be scrapped due to playground upgrade, Irlam Rotary club set up a project to save this engine Restored by Birse Construction, it is now located on land donated by Saltford City Council on the Irlam and Cadishead by-pass
2156		1955		0-4-0ST	4 ft 8 1/2 in (1,435 mm)	Scrapped			Built for Cadbury Brothers Bournville Works Railway, Birmingham
2157	Seymour	1955	R2	0-4-2T	3 ft 6 in (1,067 mm)	Preserved	Whangarei Steam and Model Railway Club, Northland, New Zealand		Last of three 0-4-2T's built for Wilsons (NZ) Portland Cement Ltd. (now Golden Bay Cement Co. Ltd.), for use at their Portland Cement Works south of Whangarei. Believed to be the last new steam locomotive imported into New Zealand. Gifted to WS&MRC on 16 December 1977, named in honour of founding member/President. Completely rebuilt with new boiler and side tanks, repainted in original green.
2158		31 March 1955	OY2	0-4-0T		Scrapped	June 1970		Built for Marchon Products, Whitehaven, Cumbria. Known as "Lady Polly". Served for a period at Albright & Wilson, then scrapped
2161	Sena No. 14	March 1957		0-6-0ST	2 ft (610 mm)	Preserved	Sandstone Estates, South Africa		Penultimate steam locomotive built by Peckett. Built for Sena Sugar Estates, and shipped to Chinde, Portuguese East Africa. The system closed during the Mozambique civil war, it was shipped to Sandstone together with 2141, 2165, two narrow gauge sister Pecketts, a number of Baguley-Drewry diesel locos, and other equipment.
2165		June 1958		0-6-0T	3 ft 6 in (1,067 mm)	Preserved	Sandstone Estates, South Africa		The last steam locomotive produced by Peckett. Built as a 3 ft (914 mm) for Sena Sugar Estates, and shipped to Chinde, Portuguese East Africa on 16 February 1954. Regauged when the line was connected to the main CFM network, it became Sena No. 7. The system closed during the Mozambique civil war, it was shipped to Sandstone together with sister loco 2141, three narrow gauge Pecketts, a number of Baguley-Drewry diesel locos, and other equipment.
2192		1944		0-4-0ST		Scrapped			Built for Ladysmith Colliery, County Durham
5000–5001		1958	Diesel 200 hp	0-4-0DM	4 ft 8 1/2 in (1,435 mm)	Scrapped			
5002		1958	Diesel 100 hp	0-4-0DM	4 ft 8 1/2 in (1,435 mm)	Scrapped			
5003	Austins No. 1	1958	Diesel 200 hp	0-4-0DM	4 ft 8 1/2 in (1,435 mm)	Preserved	Middleton Railway, Leeds		Built 1958, it was used as a demonstrator, and eventually sold to West Yorkshire steel stockholders, James Austin & Son (Dewsbury) Ltd, where it was named. Moved to the Keighley and Worth Valley Railway on permanent loan from 1971, in 2001 it moved to Middleton, fitted with vacuum brakes to enable it to work passenger trains.
5014		August 1959	Diesel 200 hp	0-6-0DM	4 ft 8 1/2 in (1,435 mm)	Preserved,	Gwili Railway, Wales		Unique as the only 0-6-0DM built by Peckett. Supplied to the Central Electricity Generating Board (CEGB) for its power station at Aberthaw where in its later years it was preserved by owners NPower as a gate guardian, plinthed and on a short length of track. Cosmetically restored at the East Somerset Railway, 2006. Following announcement of the intended closure of the power station it was donated to The Welsh Railway Trust October 2019
