= Ravenscraig steelworks =

Steelworks in North Lanarkshire, Scotland

Coordinates: 55.792017°N 3.967524°W

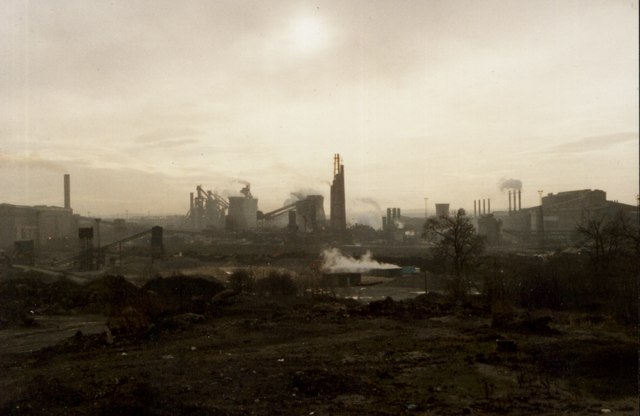
Overview of the Ravenscraig site, shortly before closure in 1992.

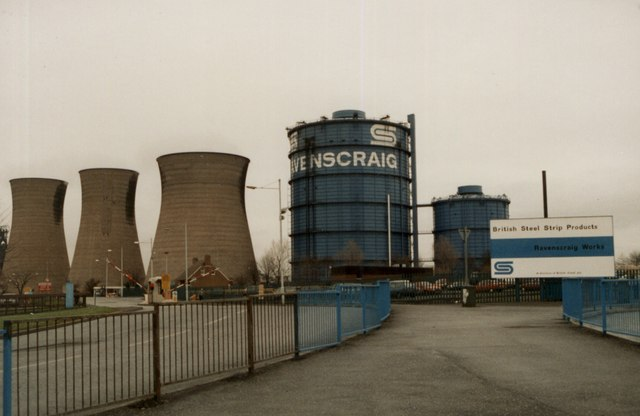
The cooling towers and gasometers at the Ravenscraig Steelworks dominated the local landscape before their demolition in 1996.

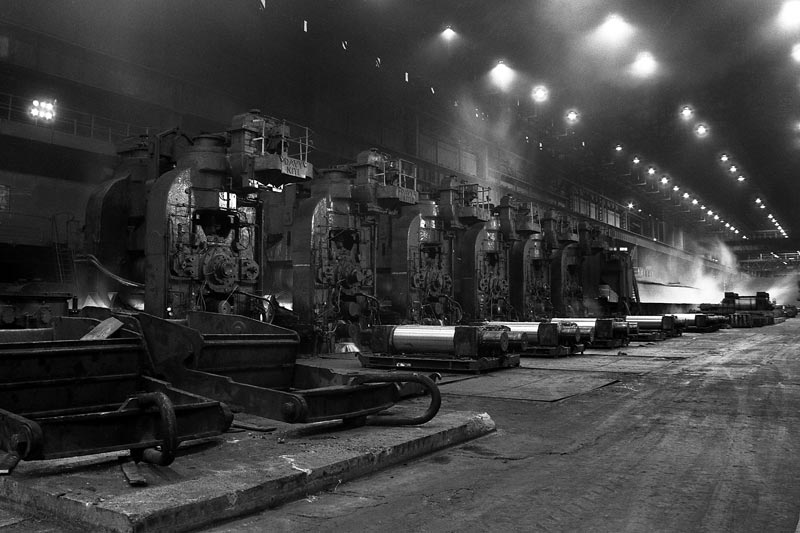
Davy rolling mills in operation at Ravenscraig in 1985.

The Ravenscraig steelworks, operated by Colvilles and from 1967 by British Steel Corporation, consisted of an integrated iron and steel works and a hot strip steel mill. They were located in Motherwell, North Lanarkshire, Scotland.

Motherwell was noted as the steel production capital of Scotland, nicknamed Steelopolis. Its skyline was dominated by the gas holder and three cooling towers of the Ravenscraig steel plant which closed in 1992. The Ravenscraig plant had one of the longest continuous casting, hot rolling, steel production facilities in the world before it was decommissioned. Construction of the integrated iron and steel works started in 1954. The steel mill, which was built shortly after, was one of four in the United Kingdom. In 1992, when it closed down, it was the largest hot strip steel mill in Western Europe.

The former steelworks and strip mill have now been cleared, and the site is in the process of becoming the new community area of Ravenscraig.

== History ==
=== Strip mill ===
On 15 February 1951, as a result of the Iron and Steel Act 1949, the nationalised Scottish iron and steel companies came under the ownership of the Iron and Steel Corporation of Great Britain. However, a change of government and the passing of the Iron and Steel Act 1953, gradually returned the former nationalised iron and steel companies to their original owners. This was to be achieved via the Iron and Steel Holding and Realisation Agency, which was charged with creating an efficient industry. Stewarts & Lloyds was returned to its former owners in 1954; and Colvilles in 1955. Shortages of strip steel led to the need to increase the capacity for producing strip steel and tin plate, the first strip mill in Great Britain having been opened at Ebbw Vale in the late 1930s.

A major expansion of Colvilles, the largest steel manufacturer in the United Kingdom before World War II, was approved in July 1954 by the Iron and Steel Board.

=== The iron and steel works ===
It was first considered that a fourth blast furnace at Clyde Iron Works (at Tollcross, east of Glasgow) was to be built, but a shortage of coking coal in Scotland meant that concentrating iron production at Clyde Iron would stop the other Colvilles works in Motherwell from being converted to hot metal working. The new location was found and surveyed in 1953.

In 1954 construction work started in Ravenscraig, turning a green field into a site for steelworks. By 1957 several coke ovens, a by-products plant, a blast furnace and an open hearth melting shop with three steelmaking furnaces were built, and by 1959 a stripmill was complete.

== Transport links ==
In 1954, as part of the development of Ravenscraig steelworks, Colvilles and British Railways began installing new wharfage and facilities at General Terminus Quay on the River Clyde at Kingston, near the centre of Glasgow. These facilities were designed to allow the simultaneously unloading of two large ships carrying bulk iron ore. The ships were designed to carry 12,000 tons (12,200 tonnes) of iron ore. Iron ore was to be transported, in railway wagons, via the General Terminus and Glasgow Harbour Railway, from the General Terminus Quay to Motherwell and Ravenscraig.

In 1954, Scotland imported 1,436,000 tons (1,460,000 tonnes) of iron ore, mainly from Sweden, North Africa, and Newfoundland. In March 1949, forward plans by Colvilles, to justify the construction of Ravenscraig, indicated that the General Terminus Quay ore-handling facility would be handling two million tons of basic iron ore per year: 1,020,000 tons per year for the Clyde Iron Works and 980,000 tons for Ravenscraig steelworks.

In the late 1970s, the General Terminus Quay was replaced by the purpose-built deep-water Hunterston Ore Terminal, near West Kilbride, which became operational in 1978. It was designed to accept bulk ore carriers of up to 350,000 tonnes capacity. In the early 1980s the ore-handling equipment was demolished at General Terminus Quay. By the 2000s it had been removed entirely and replaced by apartments and a cinema complex.

== Closure ==
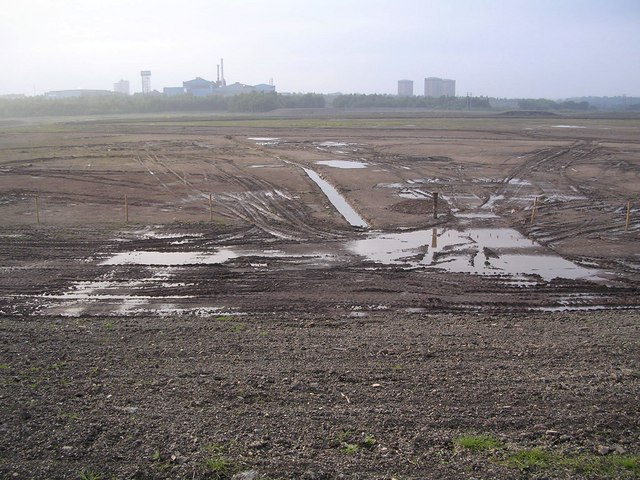
Derelict site of the Ravenscraig Works, looking towards the remaining Dalzell Works, in 2006.

The closure of Ravenscraig in 1992 signalled the end of large-scale steel making in Scotland. It led to a direct loss of 770 jobs, and another 10,000 jobs linked to these (although the nearby steel plants at Dalzell in Motherwell and Clydebridge in Cambuslang were in 2012 still in operation under the ownership of Tata Steel Europe, with both acquired by Liberty House Group in 2017).

Demolition of the site's landmark blue gasometer in 1996 and the subsequent cleanup operation have created the largest brownfield site in Europe. This huge area between Motherwell and Wishaw is in line to be transformed into the new town of Ravenscraig, a project partly funded by the successor company to British Steel, Tata Steel Europe.
