= Whangarei Steam and Model Railway Club =

Heritage railway club in New Zealand

Coordinates: 35.74321°S 174.27095°E

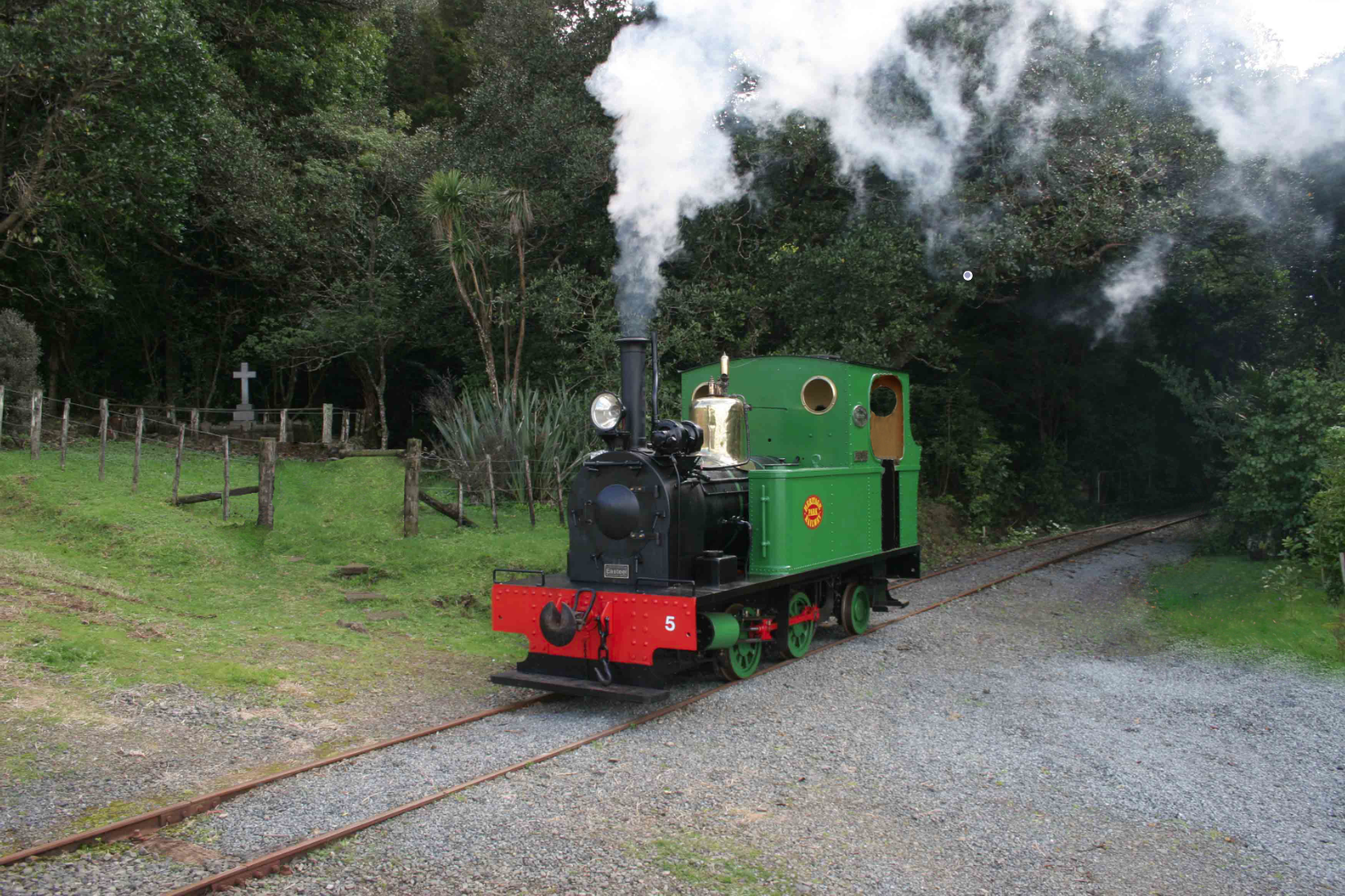
Peckett 0-4-2T N°2157 of 1955

The Whangarei Steam and Model Railway Club Inc. was formed in 1978 for the purpose of acquiring, preserving, and operating vintage steam and diesel trains for the education and enjoyment of club members and the general public, the railway operates on Museum Live Days and special occasions over its own 0.8-kilometer (0.50 mi) main track. The club has in its care two Peckett steam locomotives (one from 1924 and one from 1955), a Union Foundry, one Bagnall diesel loco, a Drewry and a Price diesel shunters.

== Locomotives and Rolling Stock ==
=== Locomotives ===
Key:	In service	In service, Mainline Certified	Under overhaul/restoration	Stored	Static display	Scrapped

Number	Builder	Builder's number	Year built	Arrived in Whangārei	Notes
Bagnall 3132	W. G. Bagnall	3132	1958	2005	Built for Portland Cement and classified as PC 10. Withdrawn in 1990 and sold to Kamo Engineering for storage. It was then purchased by the club in 2005 and is stored.
Drewry 2722	Drewry	2722	1960	2008	Built for Portland Cement and classified as PC 12. Withdrawn in 1990 and purchased by the club. It has been named "Johnny" in preservation.
Peckett 1664	Peckett & Sons	1664	1924	1970	Built for Wilsons's Portland Cement and classified as WPC 5. Purchased by the club in 1970. Placed on display in a public park until 1987, when it was placed into storage at the railway and is currently awaiting restoration.
Peckett 2157	Peckett & Sons	2157	1955	1978	Built for Wilsons's Portland Cement and classified as WPC 4. Purchased by the club in 1977. Used at Whangārei until being taken out of service for a complete restoration. This was completed in 2006 with a new boiler. It is notable for being the last imported steam locomotive into New Zealand. It has been named "Seymour" in preservation.
Price 200	A & G Price	200	1961	2005	Built for Pacific Steel, Ōtāhuhu in 1961. In 1962 it was sold to NZ Farmers Fertiliser, Whangarei. Used until 2003 when it was placed in storage. In 2005 it was purchased by the club and is operational mainly on work trains.
Union 44	Union Foundry	44	1970	n/a	Built for Northland Farmers Fertiliser. It was then purchased by the club and is used as a shunter.

== Trams ==
Whangarei Steam and Model Railway Club has two 900 mm or 2 ft 11 7/16 in gauge former Lisbon trams 520 and 526 acquired by Dave Harre for Heritage Trams for Henderson, Auckland project he was promoting, having previously stored in Aspen, Colorado for another promoted tramway. One of the Lisbon tram bodies was restored by Mr Harre's group prior to the Henderson project (2003-2013) being abandoned and the trams being acquired by the Whangarei Steam Group, which are converting the two trams to 3 ft 6 in (1,067 mm) gauge and building an operating tramway attraction.
