= Clyde Iron Works =

Ironworks in Glasgow, Scotland (1786–1978)

Coordinates: 55.833304°N 4.176407°W

The Clyde Iron Works was a Scottish-based ironworking plant which operated from 1786 to 1978.

Clyde Iron occupied a large site near the Carmyle and Tollcross areas of Glasgow. The plant was built by William Cadell (1737–1819) and Thomas Edington (1742–1811) who were associated with the Carron Iron Works in Falkirk as well as other ventures. The inventor David Mushet worked there for a period. Carronades were produced at the works during the Napoleonic Wars period.

Clyde Iron was the location of a key development in the Industrial Revolution in Scotland when James Beaumont Neilson successfully introduced the hot blast furnace in 1828, reducing the volume and carbon content of coal needed in the furnaces to produce the iron, which in turn meant that Scottish metal became cheaper to produce using local coal.

From the 1860s the works was served by a major railway after the Whifflet Line between Glasgow and Coatbridge was constructed directly to the south of the site. Ironstone was obtained from Monklands and coal from local pits across Lanarkshire such as in Carmyle and Cambuslang via connecting industrial railway lines, until the supply from those sources was eventually exhausted. "Miners row" cottages were also built for workers near to the iron works and the pits.

In 1931 Clyde Iron was overtaken by Colvilles and extensively modernised; shortly afterwards in 1939 the works was integrated with the nearby Clydebridge Steelworks (producing both the hot metal and the finished steel). New furnaces were installed in 1948.

By the late 20th century the facility included a research laboratory, a small power station to meet energy needs, and an on-site gas holder for the town gas produced in the coking processes – the excess electricity was able to be supplied to the national grid and the gas to the Scottish Gas Board.

During the period when Clydebridge and the Clyde Iron Works were economically linked between the 1940s and 1970s, a gas pipeline and railway bridge were constructed over the River Clyde which separated the two plants. Both plants were operated by British Steel Corporation from 1967 until 1977 when the Iron Works closed down after 191 years of operation – most of Clydebridge's operations also ceased at that time.

During the 1980s the site was cleared (other than a few remaining small buildings close to Junction 2A of the M74 motorway) by the Glasgow Development Agency and Scottish Enterprise and is now an industrial estate (Glasgow East Investment Park, sometimes referred to as Cambuslang Investment Park although it is not in Cambuslang) that includes the local Royal Mail distribution centre, and the printing facility of newspapers including The Herald and Evening Times, opened in 2002.

Tollcross was also home to another steelworks (a tube plant that was part of the Stewarts & Lloyds empire) which too has closed and been cleared, with housing now on that site.

Clyde Iron Works in Glasgow has no direct link to the factory of the same name in Duluth, Minnesota which is now redeveloped as a restaurant, nor any link to the 19th century firms of that name associated with Samuel Osborn & Company of Sheffield.
