= GSR Class 495 =

Class of 1 Irish 0-4-0ST locomotive

GSR 495 Class
Type and origin
- Power type: Steam
- Builder: Peckett
- Model: Beaufort/E
- Build date: 1920
- Total produced: 1
Specifications
- Configuration
  - Whyte: 0-4-0ST
- Gauge: 5 ft 3 in (1,600 mm)
- Driver dia.: 2 ft 9 in (840 mm)
- Length: 19 ft 5 1/2 in (5,931 mm) (est.)
- Loco weight: 18 long tons (18 t)
- Water cap.: 475 imp gal (2,160 L; 570 US gal)
- Boiler pressure: 160 lbf/in^{2} (1.10 MPa)
- Cylinders: 2
- Cylinder size: 10 in × 15 in (254 mm × 381 mm)
Performance figures
- Tractive effort: 6,181 lbf (27.49 kN)
Career
- Operators: Allman & Co. Distillers, Bandon; Great Southern Railways (GSR); CIÉ
- Class: M3 (Inchicore)
- Power class: TT
- Number in class: 1
- Numbers: 495
- Locale: Ireland
- Withdrawn: 1949

The Great Southern Railways (GSR) Class 495 consisted of a single 0-4-0ST built by Peckett and Sons and originally supplied to Allman & Co., Distillers of Bandon, County Cork in 1920. It was purchased in 1930 by the GSR for use on Victoria Quays section of the Cork City Railways where it had the ability to negotiate tight curves and was the only locomotive permitted to work the sharp curves to Anderson's Quay. From the mid 1930s it appears to have been used only intermittently and was withdrawn in 1949.
