= Peckett W4 class =

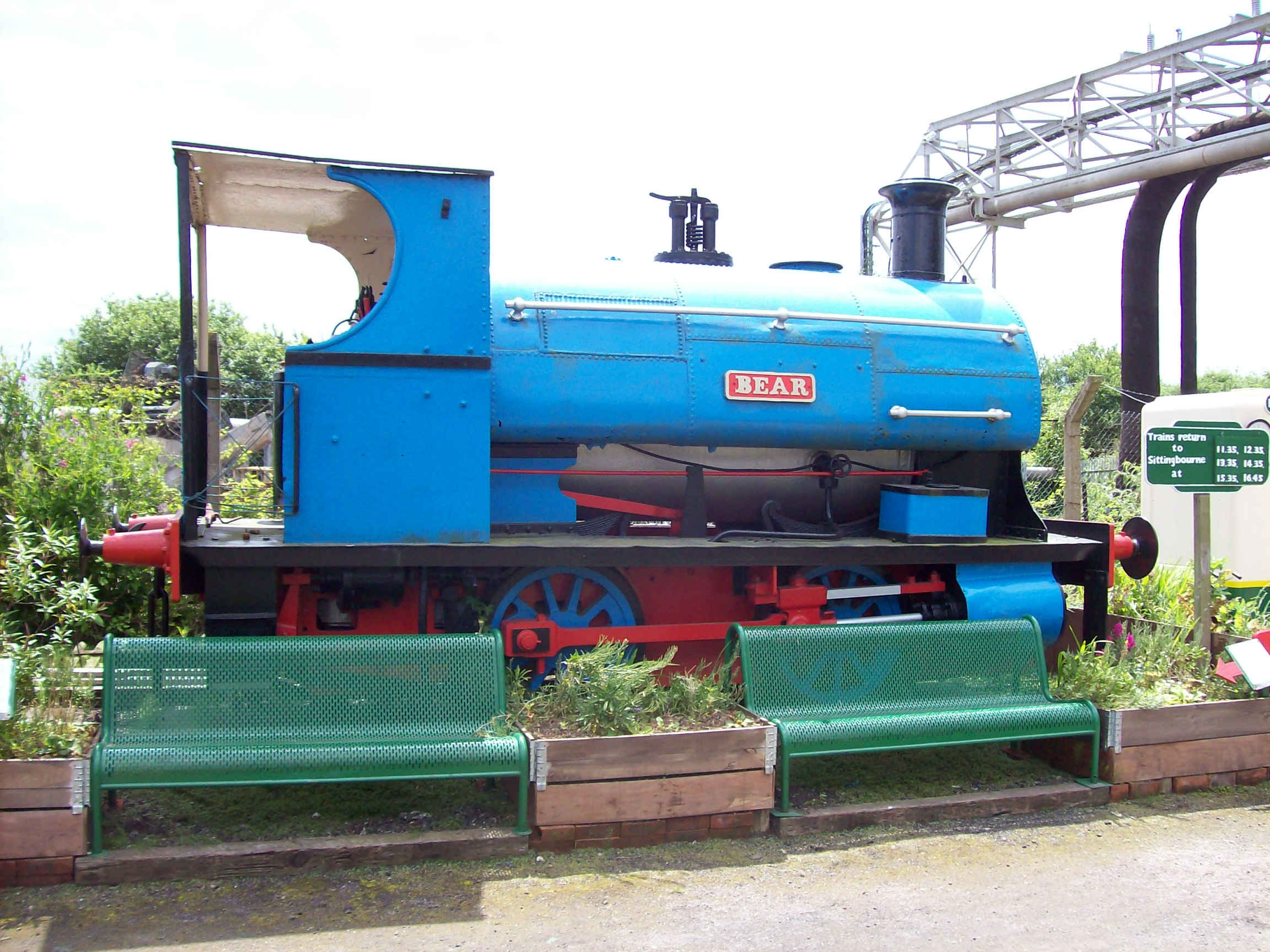
- W4 Bear (614 of 1896) plinthed at the Sittingbourne and Kemsley Light Railway
Type and origin
- Power type: Steam
- Builder: Pecket and Sons
- Build date: 1885–1906
- Total produced: 140
Specifications
- Configuration
  - Whyte: 0-4-0ST
  - UIC: B n2t
- Gauge: 4 ft 8 1/2 in (1,435 mm)
- Coupled dia.: 3 ft 3 1/2 in (1,003 mm)
- Wheelbase: 5 ft 6 in (1.676 m)
- Length: 18 ft (5.49 m)
- Width: 8 ft 0 in (2.44 m)
- Height: 11 ft 7 in (3.53 m)
- Loco weight: 23 long tons (23 t)
- Fuel type: Coal
- Fuel capacity: 1 long ton 9 hundredweight (1,500 kg; 3,200 lb)
- Water cap.: 660 imp gal (3,000 L; 790 US gal)
- Cylinders: Two, outside
- Cylinder size: 14 in × 20 in (360 mm × 510 mm)

The Peckett W4 class is a class of 0-4-0 ST steam locomotives built by Peckett and Sons at the Atlas Works factory in Bristol, England from 1885 to 1906. 140 Peckett W4 locomotives were built in total, and they were part of a family of six W-class locomotive engines (W2 through W7), which featured cylinders 14 inches (360 mm) in diameter. The W4 class has a piston stroke of 20 in (508 mm), driving wheels with a diameter of 3 ft 3 1/2 in (1,003 mm) and a wheelbase of 5 ft 6 in (1.676 m).

The more notable Peckett and Sons customers (and the number of locomotives they purchased) included Manchester Ship Canal (3), Ebbw Vale Steelworks (2), and Huntley and Palmers (1).

The ‘W4’ was produced from 1885 to 1906. Of the 140 examples which were constructed, only 3 have made it to preservation

- No. 614 "Bear", built in 1896 for James Dunlop’s Ironworks on the Clyde [currently at at the Buckinghamshire Railway Centre]

- No. 737 "Daphne", built in 1899 for the Tytherington Quarry Company [currently at the Ribble Steam Railway &^ Museum]

- No. 933 "Henry Court" built in 1903, one of a pair delivered to Ebbw Vale [currently at The Foxfield Railway]

== Models ==
In October 2015, the British model railway brand Hornby Railways announced that it would make a OO gauge model of the Pecket W4.

In February 2016, Hornby also discussed how the first batch of liveries was painted: Dodo (563 of 1893) was painted the default light green used by Peckett and Sons (unless the customer specified otherwise). No. 11 of the Manchester Ship Canal (654 of 1897) was painted a dark green, while Huntley and Palmer's 'D' (832 of 1900) is painted in that company's lined blue livery. Hornby has since released a model of No. 614 Bear, preserved at the S&KLR.
