= David Colville & Sons =

Scottish iron and steel company

Coordinates: 55.78811°N 3.982458°W

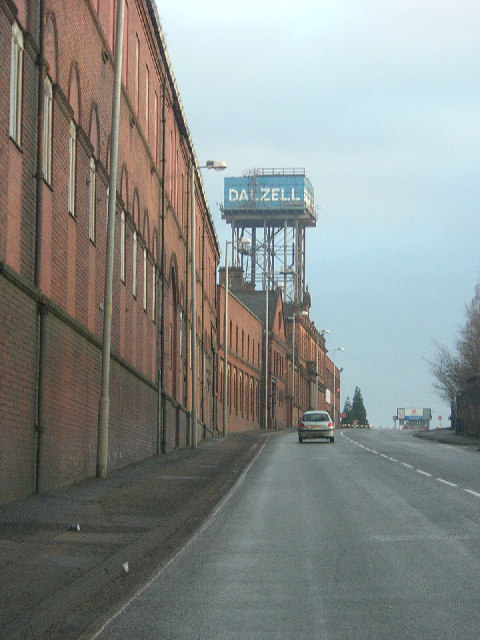
Dalzell Works, opened by Colville in 1872, nationalised under British Steel Corporation in 1967 and today operated by Liberty House Group.

David Colville & Sons, a Scottish iron and steel company, was founded in 1871 and it opened its Dalzell Steel and Iron Works at Motherwell in 1872. By the first World War, it was the largest steel works in Scotland and it continued to expanded afterwards taking over a number of other steel works in Cambuslang and Glengarnock.

Nationalised in 1951, it became part of the Iron and Steel Corporation of Great Britain. It was privatised in 1955 and the construction of Ravenscraig steelworks resulted in the closure of a number of its other works. It was renationalised in 1967, becoming part of British Steel Corporation.

The company provided steel to famous liners like the Titanic and the Queen Mary.

== Formation and expansion ==
David Colville & Sons was founded in 1871. The company's first plant was the Dalzell Steel and Iron Works in Motherwell, which was opened in 1872, and by World War I this plant was the largest individual steel works in the country.

Colville's quickly grew into a substantial concern, and by 1900 they were the largest employers in Motherwell. During World War I the Government of the United Kingdom asked Colville's to intervene in some of the nearby struggling steel plants, and to that effect they took over the running of the Clydebridge Steel Company works in Cambuslang in 1915, and the Glengarnock works in 1916.

== Nationalisation, privatisation and renationalisation ==
1951 saw the company taken into public ownership, under the direction of the Labour government of Clement Attlee, as part of the Iron and Steel Corporation of Great Britain. Public subsidy underwrote the start of Colville's Ravenscraig steelworks project in 1954, although Colville's was subsequently returned to private ownership by the Conservative government of Anthony Eden in 1955. In 1957 construction of the integrated Ravenscraig steelworks at Motherwell was completed at a cost of £20 million, and as a result of this, a number of older Colville furnaces were demolished.

In 1967, Colville's was renationalised, and became part of British Steel Corporation.

== 21st Century at the plants ==
Tata Steel closed the Dalzell and Clydebridge works in 2015, but both reopened in 2016 following the sale of the sites to Liberty House Group. However, the viability of the sites was again placed in doubt when the Liberty holding company was issued with a winding-up petition in early 2022 over substantial debts, a situation compounded by the collapse in productivity caused by the COVID-19 pandemic in Scotland.
