= Bellshill Maternity Hospital =

- NHS Lanarkshire
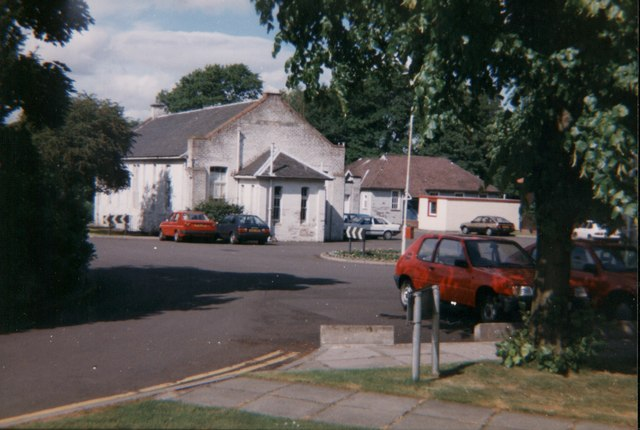
- Buildings from the original Bellshill Maternity Hospital built in the 1870s

- Shown in North Lanarkshire

Geography
- Location: Bellshill, North Lanarkshire, Scotland
- Coordinates: 55.8292°N 4.0259°W

Organisation
- Care system: NHS Scotland

History
- Founded: 1870s
- Closed: 2001

Links
- Other links: List of hospitals in Scotland

Bellshill Maternity Hospital was a health facility at Bellshill in North Lanarkshire, Scotland.

== History ==
The hospital was built as a poor law hospital in the 1870s. It became an infectious diseases hospital in 1892 and a maternity hospital in 1917. An early obstetric flying squad was established at the hospital in the 1930s. It joined the National Health Service in 1948. A modern facility, designed by Gillespie, Kidd & Coia was opened by the Queen in July 1962. After maternity services transferred to Wishaw General Hospital in 2001, the buildings were demolished in 2003 and the site was subsequently redeveloped for residential use.

== Notable births ==
Notable people born in the hospital include:

- Robin Cook, politician
- Sheena Easton, singer
- Ayesha Hazarika, politician
- Ally McCoist, footballer
- Paul McGuigan, film maker
- Lord Reid, politician
- Sharleen Spiteri, singer-songwriter; guitarist; lead vocalist of the Scottish pop-rock band Texas
