= Law Hospital =

- NHS Lanarkshire
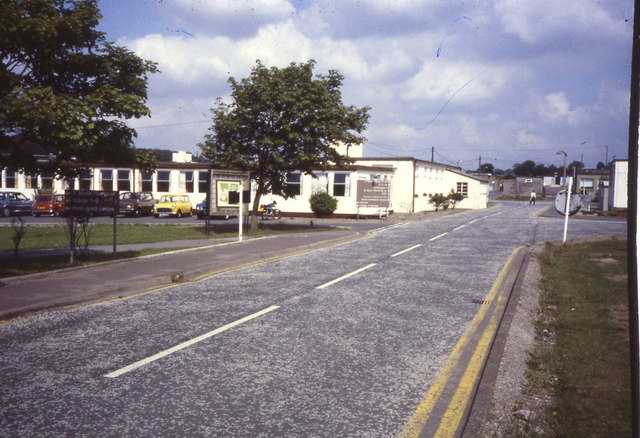
- Law Hospital

- Shown in South Lanarkshire

Geography
- Location: Law, South Lanarkshire, Scotland, United Kingdom
- Coordinates: 55.7585°N 3.8588°W

Organisation
- Care system: Public NHS
- Type: District General

History
- Founded: 1939
- Closed: 2001

Links
- Lists: Hospitals in Scotland

Law Hospital was a health facility in Law, South Lanarkshire. It was managed by NHS Lanarkshire.

== History ==
The facility was designed by Cullen, Lochhead and Brown as one of seven Emergency Hospital Service facilities and opened in 1939. It accommodated evacuees from the Central Middlesex Hospital as well as some injured German Prisoners of War during the Second World War. It joined the National Health Service in 1948. After patients had been transferred to the Wishaw Hospital, it closed in 2001. Concerns were raised when medical files were found in the derelict hospital in 2008.
