= Kello =

Kello may refer to:

== People ==
- Esther Kello (1571–1624), Scottish miniaturist, calligrapher, writer, and embroider
- Jagama Kello (1922—2017), Ethiopian military officer
- Marián Kello (born 1982), Slovak former footballer

== Other uses ==
- Kello Hospital, a health facility in Biggar, Scotland, United Kingdom
- Kello Rovers F.C., a Scottish football club
