= Law, South Lanarkshire =

Coordinates: 55.750096°N 3.882584°W

Law
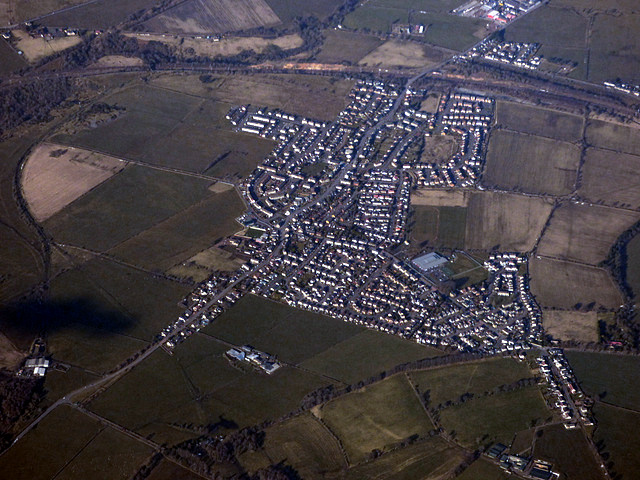
- Law from the air

- Location within South Lanarkshire
- Population: 3,090 (2020)
- OS grid reference: NS818523
- Council area: South Lanarkshire
- Lieutenancy area: Lanarkshire
- Country: Scotland
- Sovereign state: United Kingdom
- Post town: CARLUKE
- Postcode district: ML8
- Dialling code: 01698
- Police: Scotland
- Fire: Scottish
- Ambulance: Scottish
- UK Parliament: Motherwell, Wishaw and Carluke
- Scottish Parliament: Clydesdale

Law is a village situated between Carluke and Wishaw in South Lanarkshire, Scotland with a population of around 3,000. The village lies on the border of North Lanarkshire.

Law is a former mining village, now mainly a low density residential area.

== Amenities ==
For a village so small, Law has a wide range of services, the majority of which can be found on Station Road, the village's main street.

Law Parish Church can be found on Station Road. The church is part of the Church of Scotland and seeks to provide spiritual and pastoral care to anyone in the parish, church member or not, who requires it. A variety of organisations take place in the church for people of all ages including the Boys' Brigade and Girls' Brigade.

Law Primary School has approximately 240 pupils and with older pupils going on to attend Carluke High School four miles (six kilometres) away.

The West Coast Main Line runs through the north-eastern edge of the village. Law Junction railway station was closed in 1965. However, there has been much speculation that it may be reopened in future, due to the proposed building of many new homes on the old site of Law Hospital. If re-opened, cities such as Glasgow and Edinburgh could be accessible from Law by train.

Law Hospital, on the outskirts of Law Village, closed in 2001, with all patients being sent to Wishaw General Hospital, located in the Craigneuk area of Wishaw. There was an ambulance station on the site of the hospital but since 2001, the Scottish Ambulance Service opened a new one next door to Huws Gray builder's merchant on Wildman Road, which is the entrance road to the village from Wishaw.

== Law Community AFC ==
Law Community AFC, formed in 2011, is the village's local amateur football team. Their home games are played at Law Football Parks. The team are currently in the Premier Division. Their Home Kit is Red and away kit is Blue. Their sponsors are local businesses Tandoori Palace, Scotmid, TCH Law and Caledonian Bar.

Honours - Strathclyde Evangelical Churches League Division 3 Winners - 2013/14

Strathclyde Evangelical Churches League Division 2 Athol Cup Winners - 2014/15

Strathclyde Evangelical Churches League Division 1 Athol Cup Winners - 2015/16

== Notable people ==
- Roy Henderson, former professional footballer
- Ryan Finnie (footballer), professional footballer for Berwick Rangers.
- Jake Hastie (footballer), professional footballer for Motherwell
