= Lady Home Hospital =

- NHS Lanarkshire
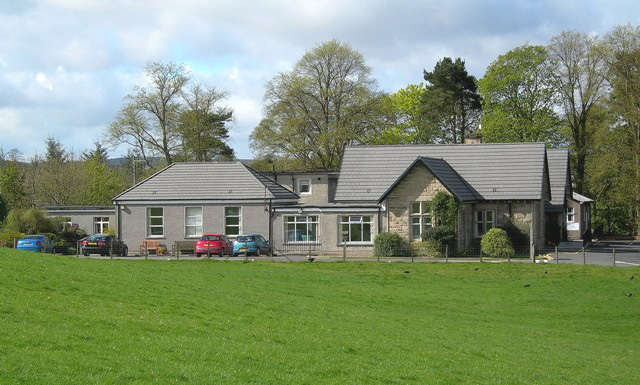
- Lady Home Hospital

- Shown in South Lanarkshire

Geography
- Location: Ayr Road, Douglas, South Lanarkshire, Scotland
- Coordinates: 55.5582°N 3.8390°W

Organisation
- Care system: NHS Scotland
- Type: Community

History
- Founded: 1888

Links
- Lists: Hospitals in Scotland

Lady Home Hospital is a health facility in Ayr Road, Douglas, South Lanarkshire, Scotland. It is managed by NHS Lanarkshire.

== History ==
The facility, which was financed by Maria Douglas-Home, Countess of Home and designed by James Kerr, was opened as the Douglas Cottage Hospital in 1888. It later became known as the Lady Home Hospital, being renamed after its founder. It was expanded in 1936 and, after joining the National Health Service in 1948, it was extended again in 1960s. A group of 30 female staff at the hospital won £1.3 million on the National Lottery in 2011.
