= Stonehouse, South Lanarkshire =

Coordinates: 55.69683°N 3.98239°W

Stonehouse
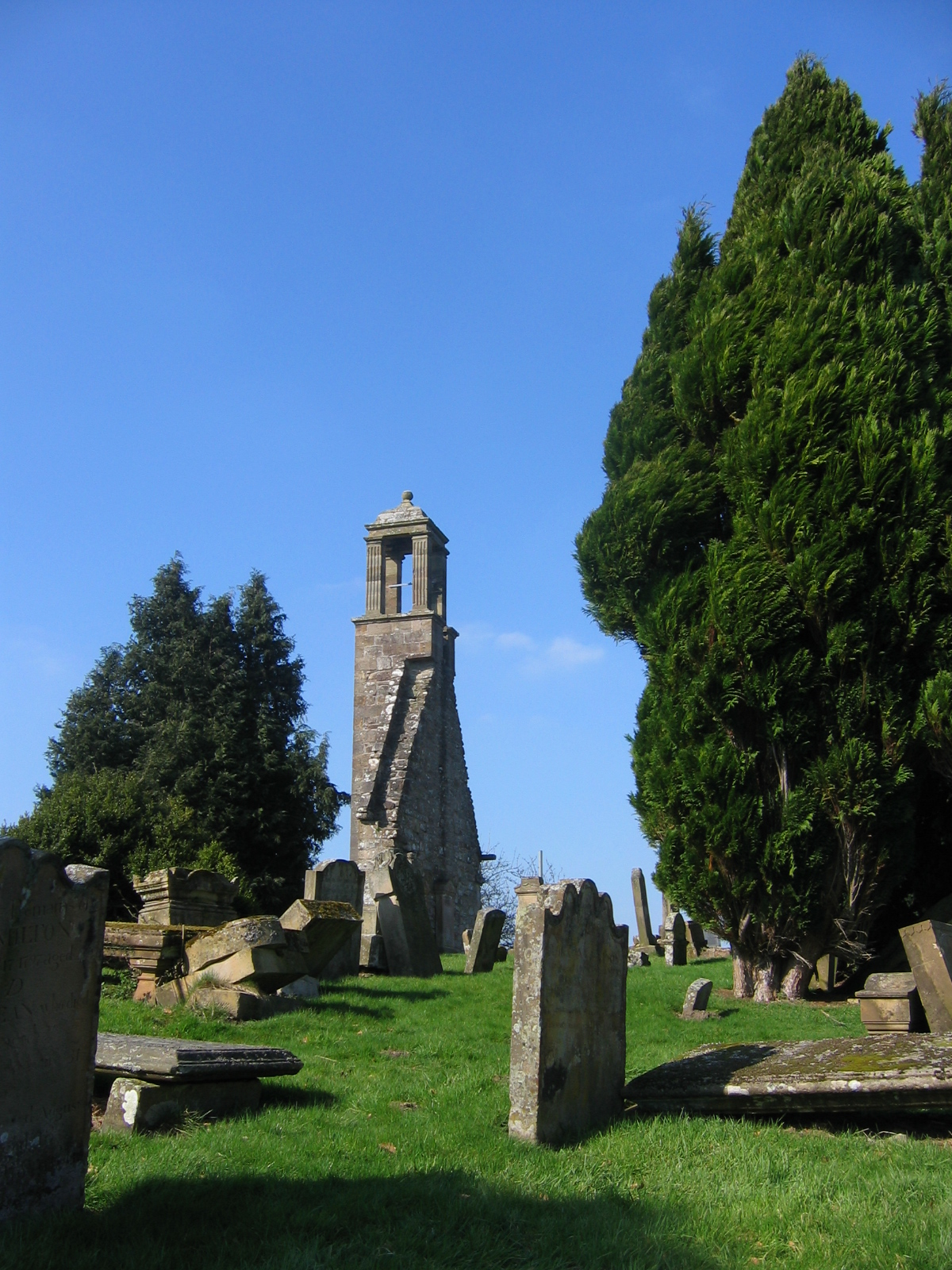
- Remains of Saint Ninian's Kirk, Stonehouse, South Lanarkshire.

- Location within South Lanarkshire
- Population: 5,550 (2020)
- OS grid reference: NS755467
  - Edinburgh: 35 1/2 mi (57 km)
  - London: 330 mi (531 km)
- Council area: South Lanarkshire
- Lieutenancy area: Lanarkshire
- Country: Scotland
- Sovereign state: United Kingdom
- Post town: LARKHALL
- Postcode district: ML9
- Dialling code: 01698
- Police: Scotland
- Fire: Scottish
- Ambulance: Scottish
- UK Parliament: East Kilbride and Strathaven; Hamilton and Clyde Valley
- Scottish Parliament: Hamilton, Larkhall and Stonehouse

Stonehouse is a rural village in South Lanarkshire, Scotland. It is on Avon Water in an area of natural beauty and historical interest, near to the Clyde Valley. It is on the A71 trunk road between Edinburgh and Kilmarnock, near the towns of Hamilton, Larkhall and Strathaven. The population of Stonehouse is around 5,500 as of 2020.

== History ==
Gallery of drawings

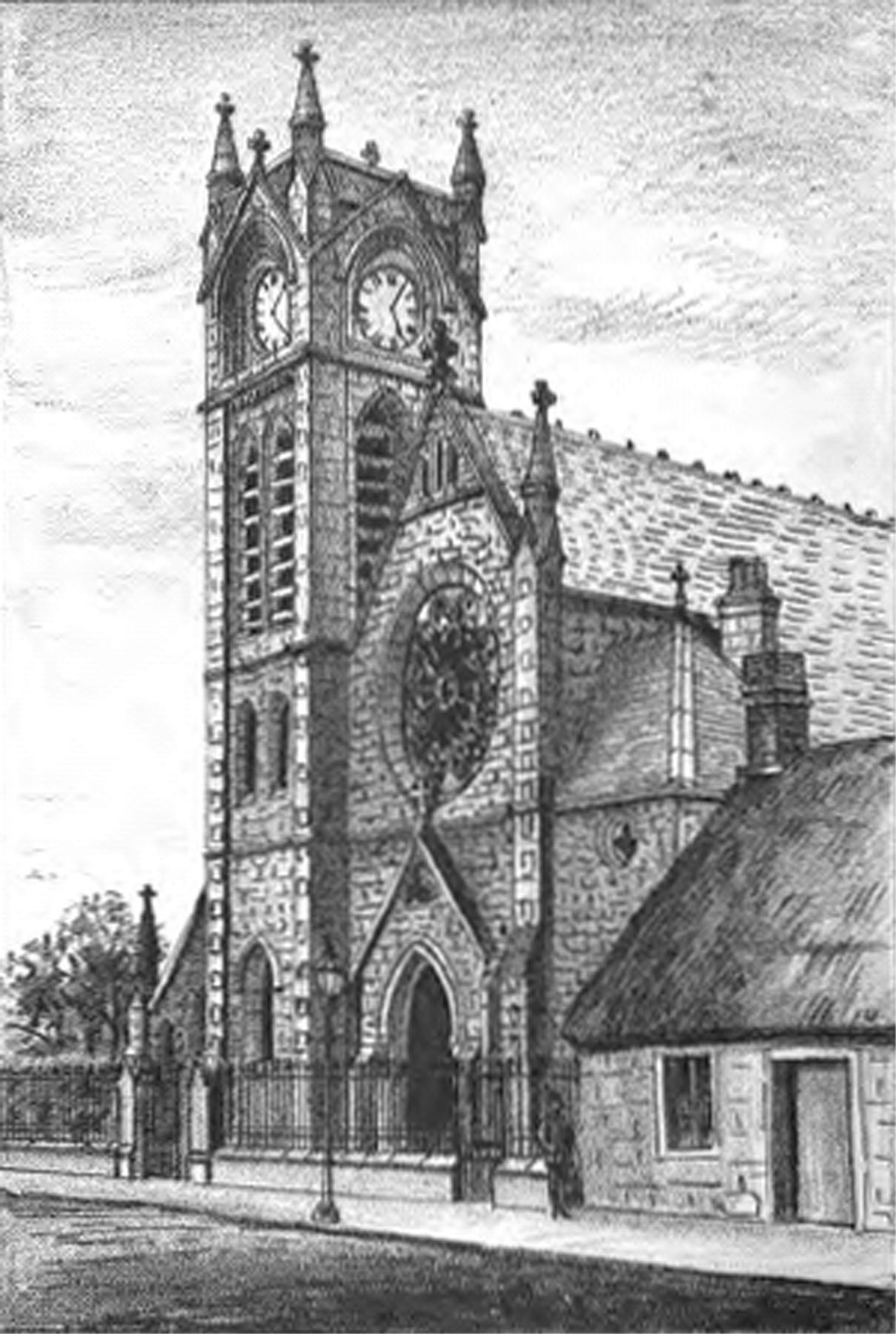
United Presbyterian Church

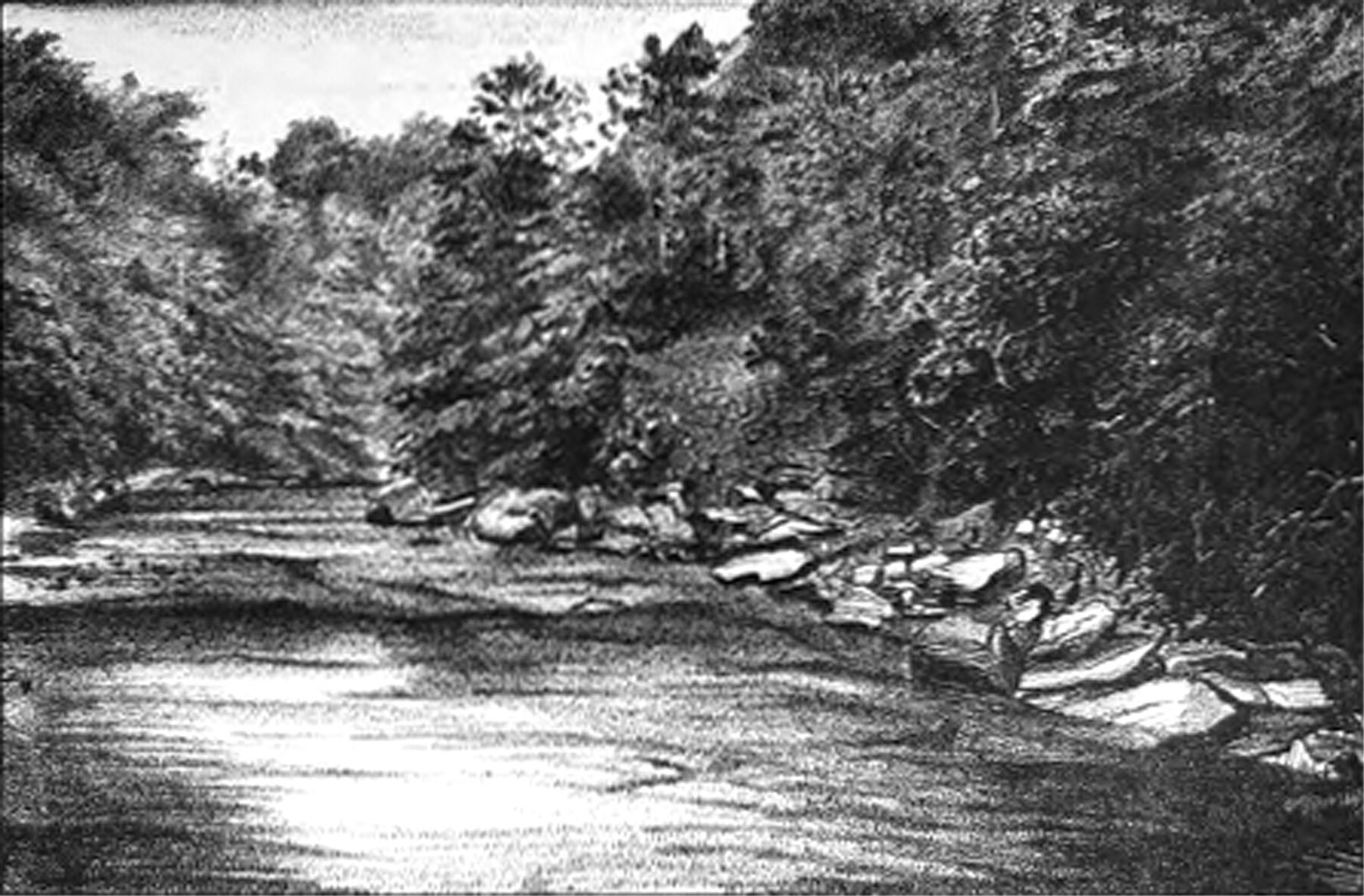
Scene near Glen-Avon

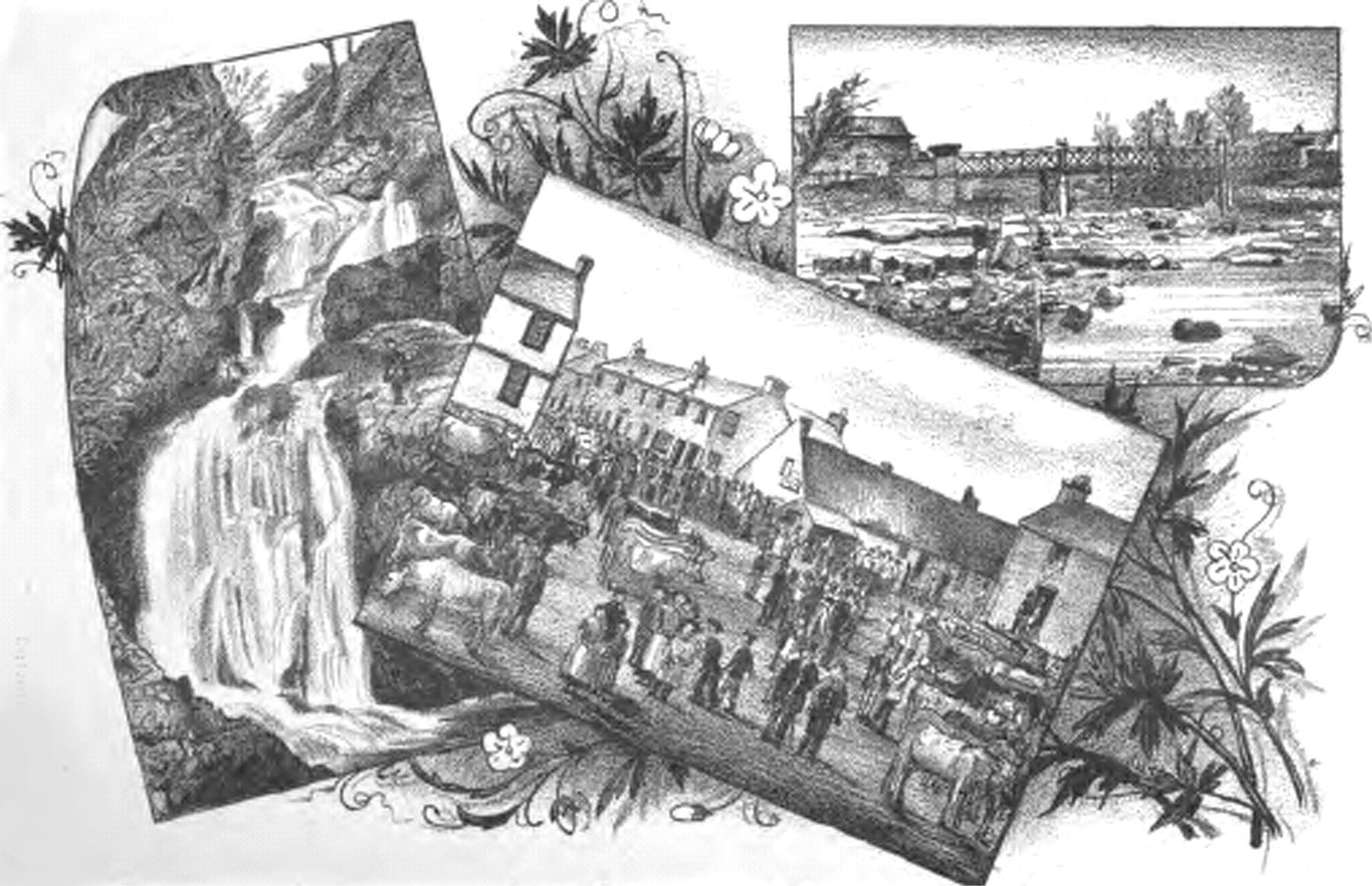
Montage of scenes: a falls, the fair at Auld Stonehouse, and Glassford Bridge

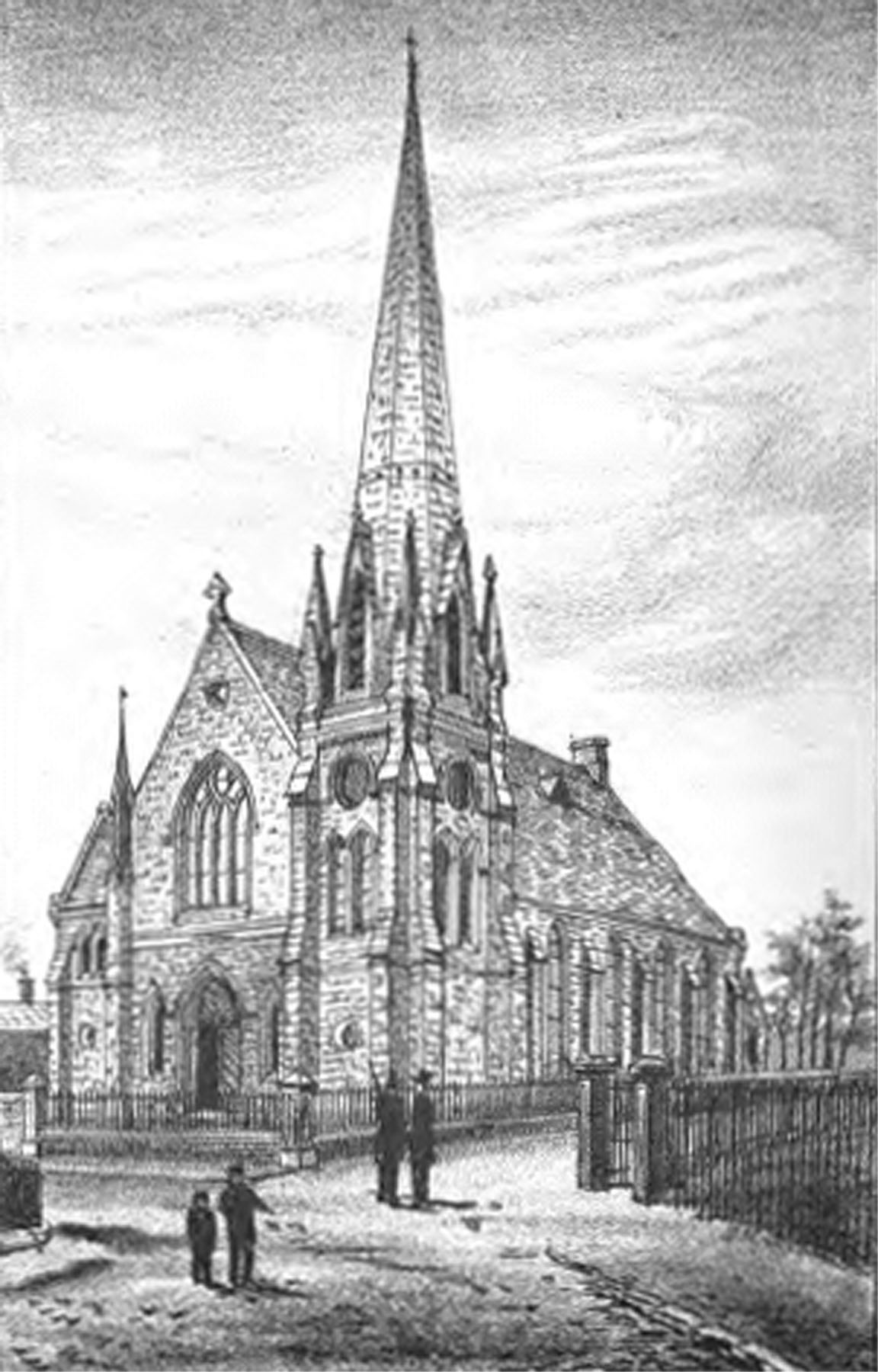
Free Church

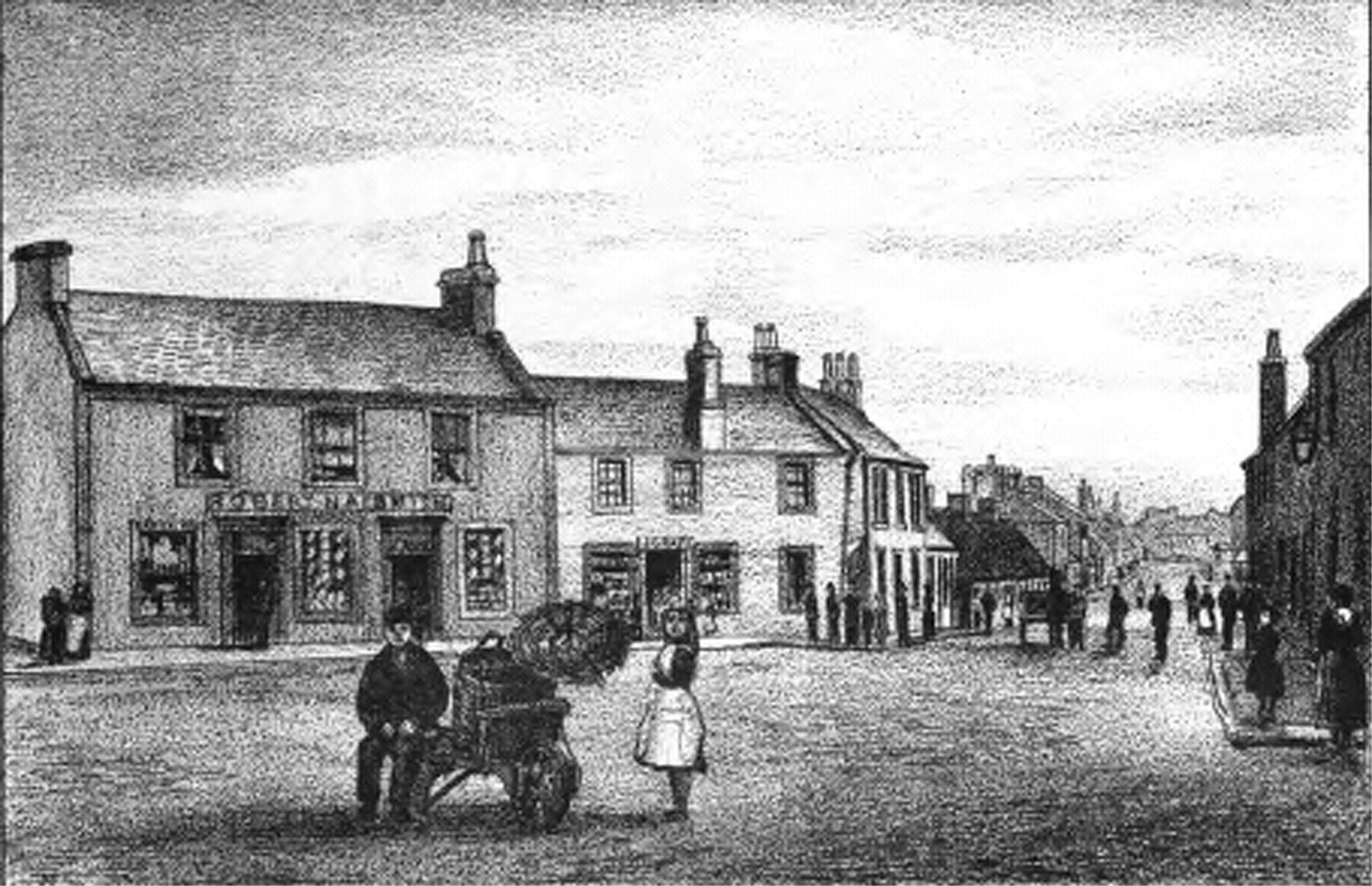
Cross and King Street

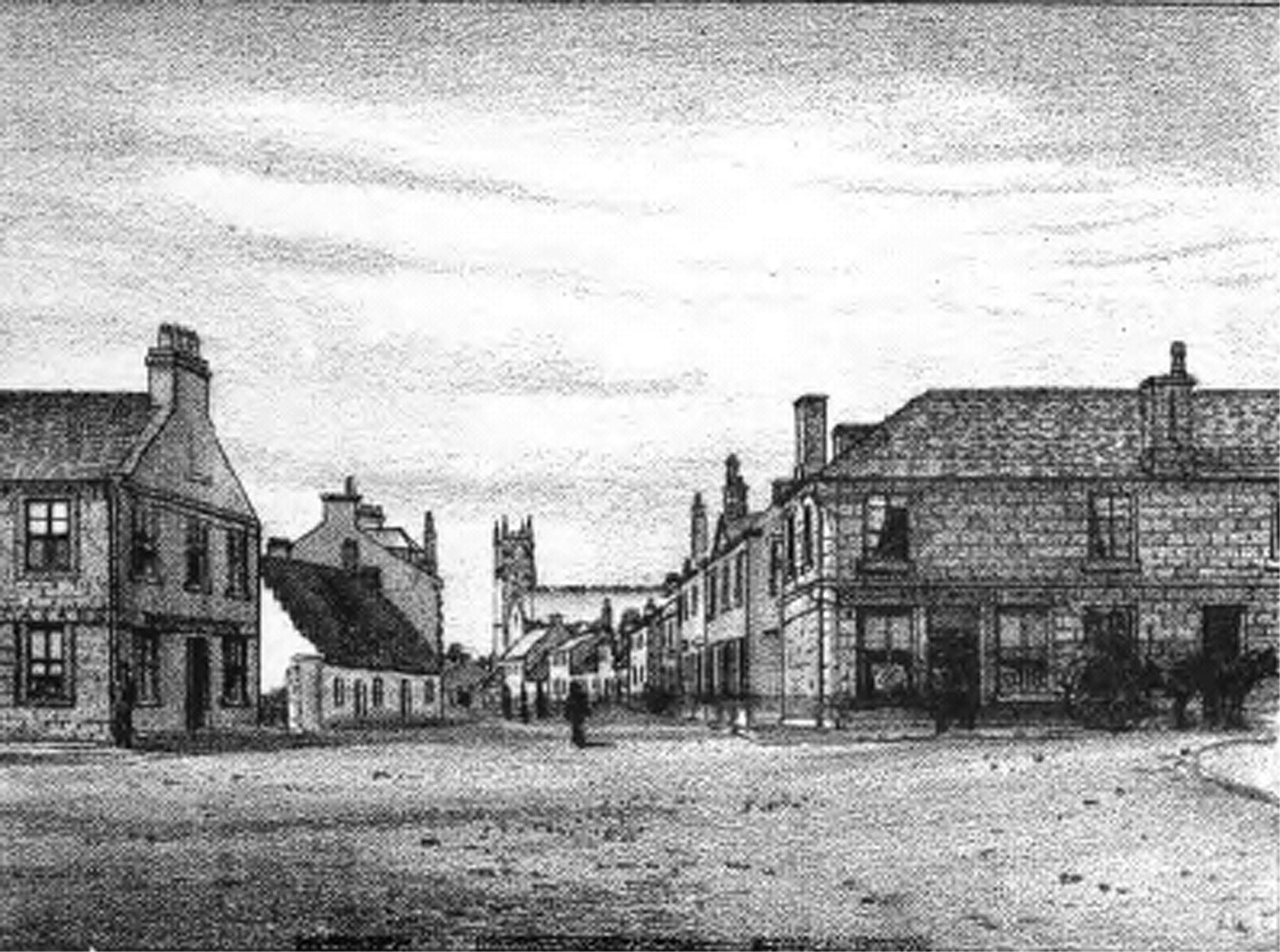
Cross and Trongate

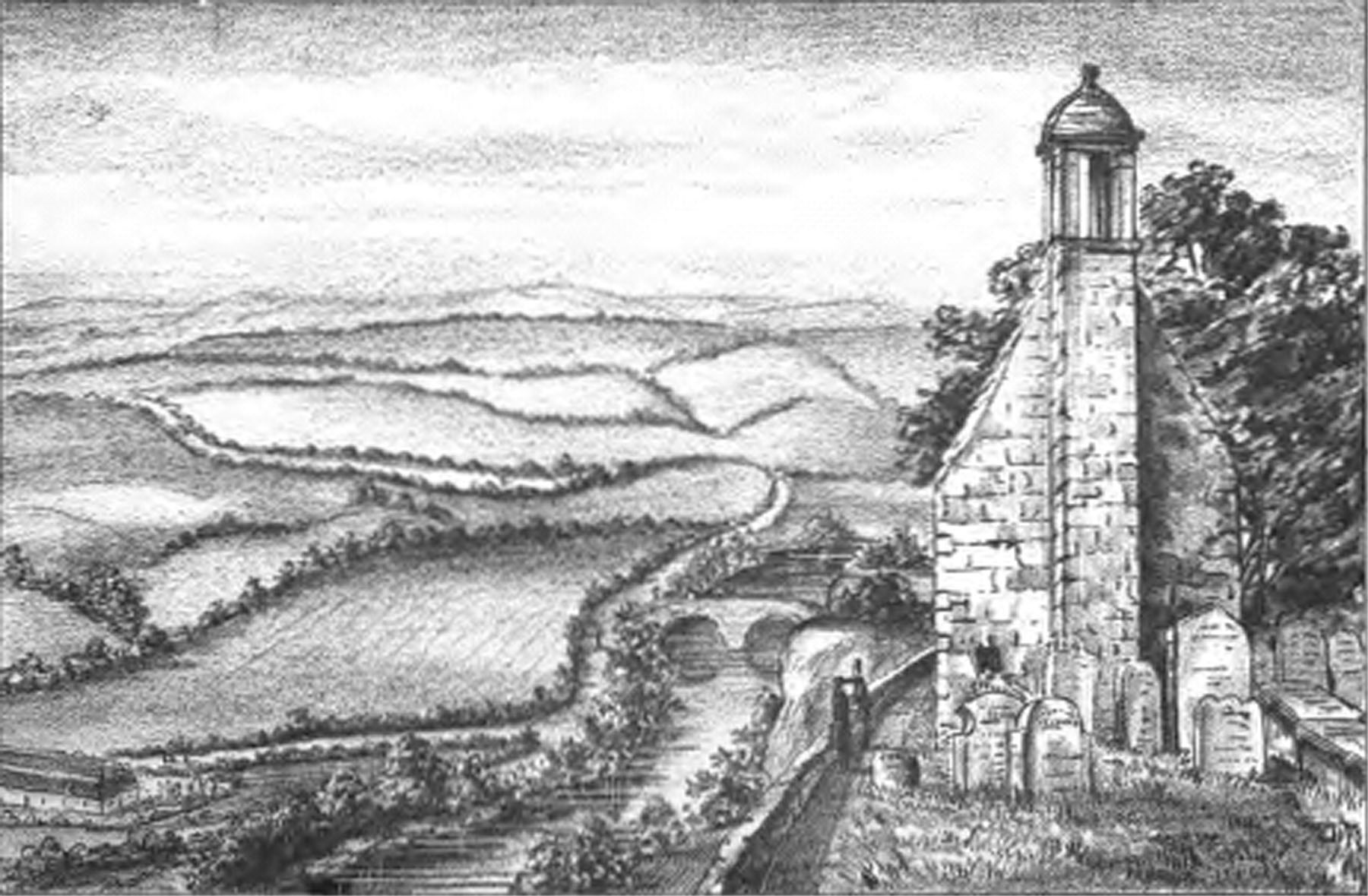
Churchyard and River Avon

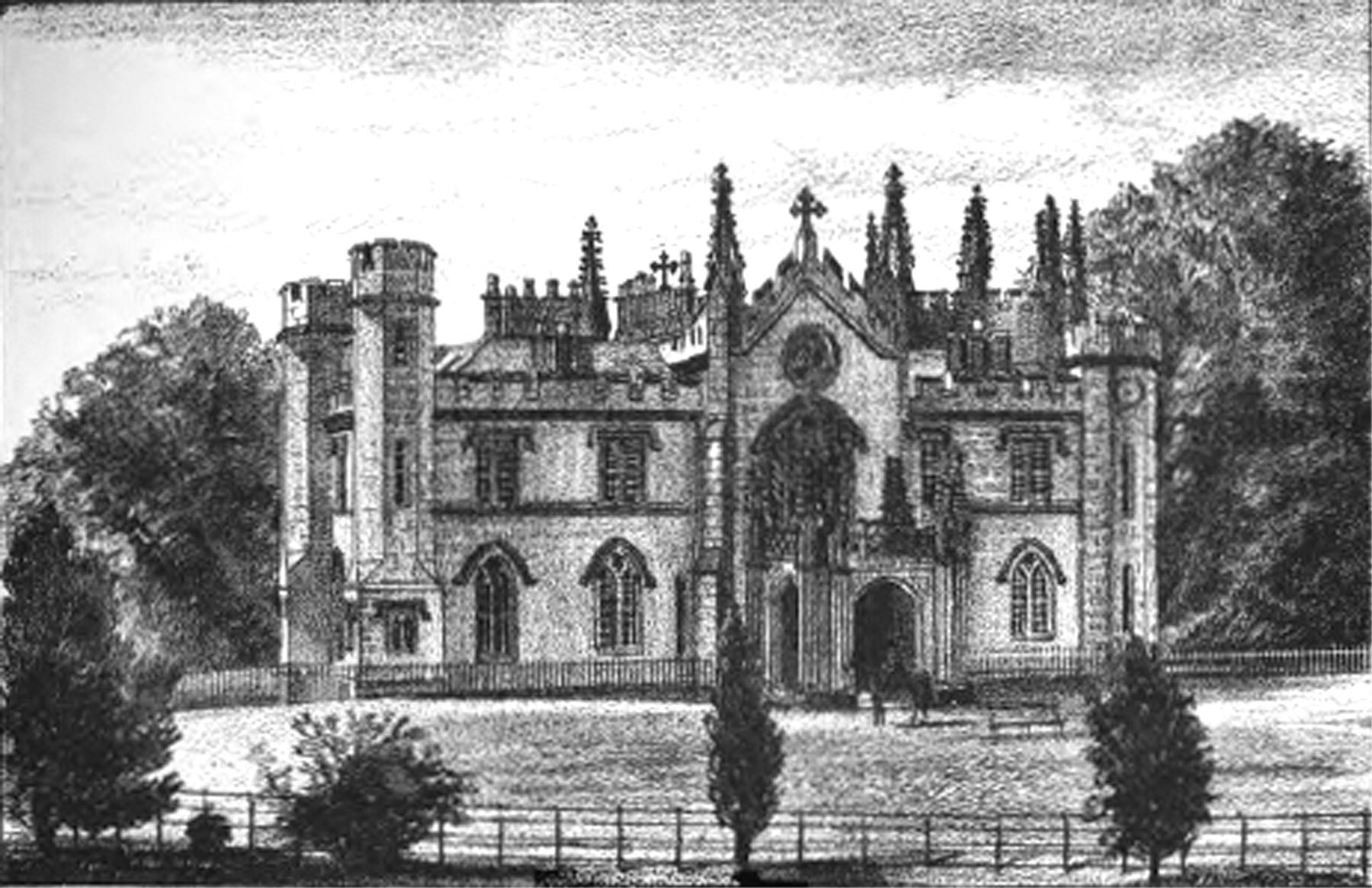
Cam'Nethan House (Residence of General Lockhart)

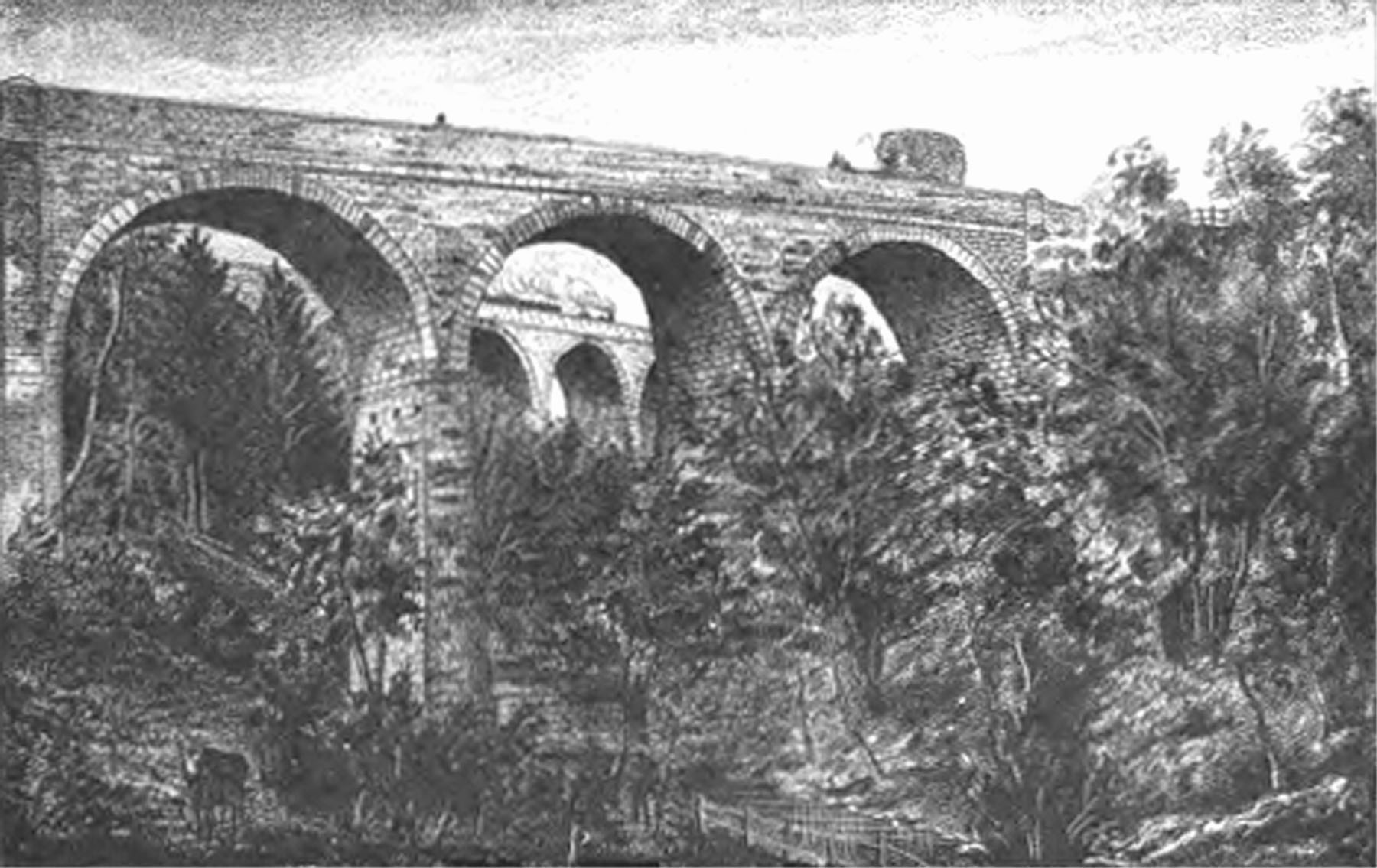
Bridges

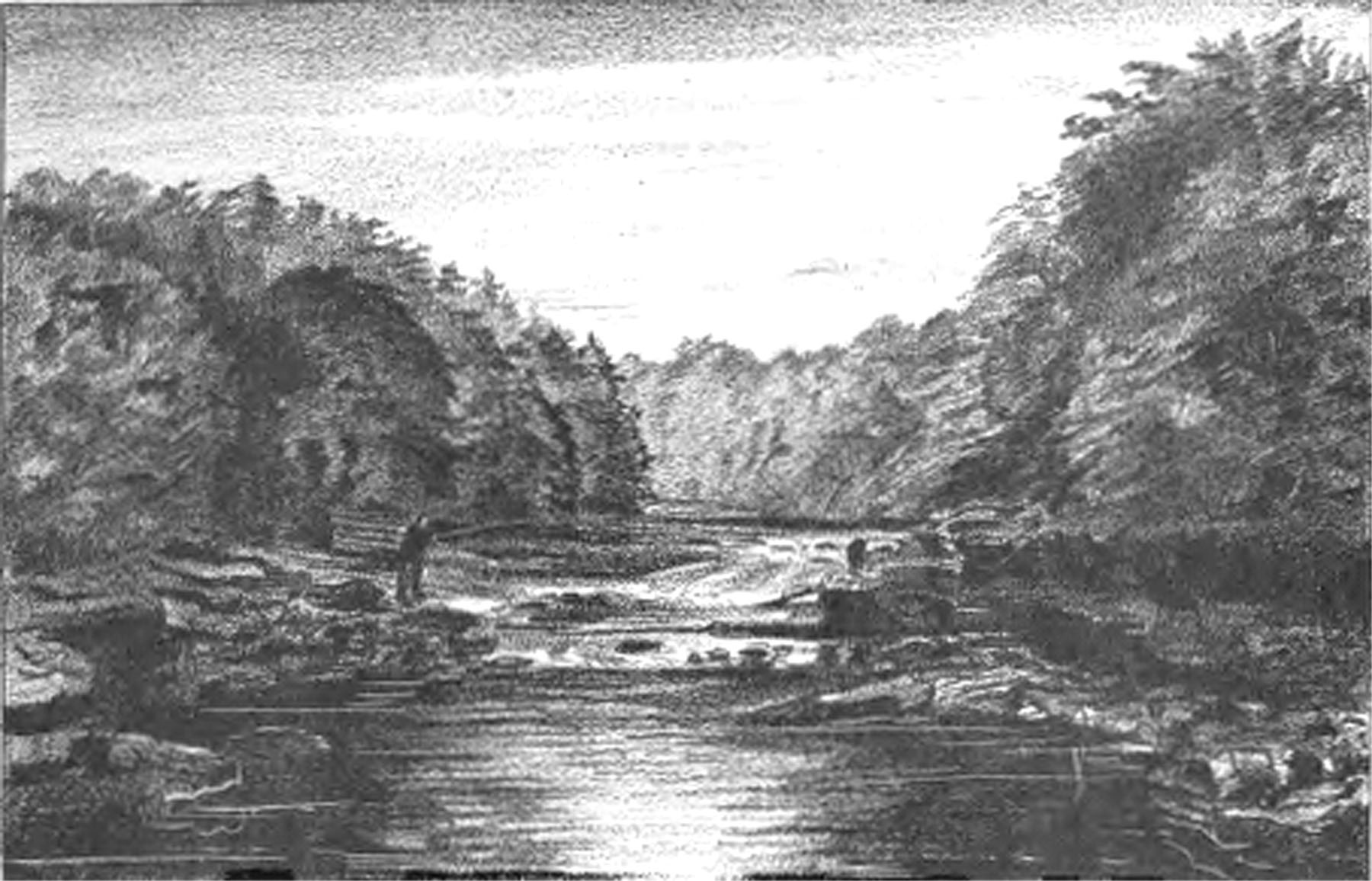
Junction of the Avon and Cander

The village's oldest structure are the ruins of St Ninian's Church, which date from the 17th century and stand in an ancient graveyard on the edge of the village. The old village centre has several rows of late 18th century and early 19th century weavers' cottages, some of which have double windows which were originally intended to maximize the amount of light coming in, for weavers working on their looms.

In 1973, Stonehouse was designated to become an addition to Scotland's new towns with the purpose of strengthening the output of public sector housing available to rehouse Glasgow's people from its unfit tenements, a modern urban design to alleviate overcrowding in and around Glasgow and to generate industrial development, similar to the towns of East Kilbride, Cumbernauld and Livingston. Stonehouse was added to the responsibilities of the East Kilbride Development Corporation. Following the West Central Scotland Plan of 1974 and the inception of Strathclyde Regional Council in 1975, regional planning strategy was refocused upon regeneration within Glasgow leading to the establishment of the GEAR project in Glasgow's East End. With the encouragement of the Regional Council, the Secretary of State for Scotland, Bruce Millan, agreed that Stonehouse's development would be halted in 1976 and de-designated in 1977 after just 96 houses had been constructed. When challenged by the Scottish Office to give evidence of the claimed interest of industries in moving to Stonehouse, the Development Corporation had been unable to demonstrate any significant interest.

=== Cot Castle ===
Cot (Kat) Castle might better be classified as a "keep" or a "tower house," more like a fortified house than castle per se. Compared to English keeps, both Scottish and Irish keeps were generally smaller, but could provide both comfort and security, during the period of border war that marked the reign of Edward I of England and those who followed him for three centuries. During the 14th and 15th centuries, keeps or tower houses were easier for the Scots to maintain against their wealthy foe to the south. Defense of Cot Castle would have been aided by the fact that it was built on the banks of the River Avon atop a cliff face. Little is known about the provenance of the castle, but it is thought to have changed hands frequently in a period when loss of a battle meant loss of one's property. However, it is known that it belonged to the Hamiltons in the year 1500.

In the 1937 Statistical Account of Stonehouse mention is made of Cot castle in the following extract:

"Among the documents discovered in 1887 in the Hamilton Chamberlain’s office, is a notarial instrument, narrating that in terms of a charter granted by himself, Alexander Hamilton of Catcastell, passed to the one-mark of Woodland and the half-merk land of Brownland, lying in the barony of Stanehouse and the sheriffdom of Lanark and there gave sasine of these lands with his own hands to James Wynzet, his heirs and assignees in usual form, 29th January 1511-12."

Cot Castle farm, which was built much later, lapsed into ruins and was abandoned altogether in the late 1970s. A railway station was also located here at more recent times.

=== Holy wells ===
Four holy wells stood in Stonehouse in pagan times, but may eventually have been adapted to Christian use as baptismal fonts. Thomas Carlyle, 19th century philosopher and writer, said this of holy wells:

It is a curious thing that I remarked long ago and have often turned in my head that the old word for 'holy' in the German language—heilig—also means 'healthy.' And so Heilbronn means 'holy well' or 'healthy well.' We have in the Scotch 'hale,’ and I suppose our English word 'whole'—with a 'w'—all of one piece without any hole in it—is the same word. I find that you could not get any better definition of what 'holy' really is than 'healthy'—completely healthy"

Richard Naismith drew the connection between the pagan and Christian use of the well, saying, "It is easy to conceive how this well would be used to administer the rite of Christian baptism and, in those superstitious times, virtues would be attributed to the water of a healing character that would cause such wells to be regarded as holy, and pilgrims from the surrounding country would flock to try the healing properties of the famous wells." He locates the well "between the churchyard and the farm of Eastmains."

=== Site of Ringsdale Castle ===
Ringsdale Castle, like Cot, was not a castle per se, but a motte. Its remains can be seen on the raised motte at the summit of the Avon Gorge, overlooking the river. The name Ringsdale is believed to be derived from the word Rhyn, meaning promontory or hill, in the language of the ancient Britons. Glenavon Cottage, reputed to have a romantic air, though all that remains now is a small corner of its walls. In addition, a mill called Cloxy (Clocksy) Mill was marked on an 1838 map as appearing near Ringsdale. Its ruins on the banks of the Avon can still be seen, though there are no extant records of its origin.

=== Other castles ===
In the area of Stonehouse, there are a number of castles on the outskirts of the parish: Allanton, Brocket, Plotcock, Glassford, and Darngaber motte.

The farm of Castlehill near Spittal seems also to have been named after a castle, which may have existed in early times, though no trace remains. It has been suggested that, given its location near the old military road that runs through the parish, it could have been established as a fort by the Romans.

=== Covenanter memorials ===
During the 17th century, the Scottish Presbyterians called Covenanters refused to accept English episcopacy in church government, which eventually erupted into armed hostilities. The area around Stonehouse was affected when the Battle of Drumclog in South Lanarkshire was fought 1 June 1679, 9 miles (14 kilometres) southwest of Stonehouse. James Thomson of Stonehouse Parish was among those who died as a result of wounds inflicted during that battle. He was buried in St. Ninian's churchyard, which, like other churchyards in the area, holds other Covenanter graves. On the 201st anniversary of the battle, in June 1880, approximately 2,000 people commemorated the Battle of Drumclog at St. Ninian's.

Another battle took place about 10 miles (16 kilometres) northeast of Stonehouse at Sodom Hill. It is believed the conflict at Sodom Hill was "a skirmish between the Convenanters and "Clavers," that is, the troops under John Graham of Claverhouse, who had been appointed captain by King Charles II. Little is known of this conflict, but Robert K. Chalmers' song "In Praise of the Avon" included these lines:

Sodom Hill and Drumclog Field

Where weavers fought and wadna yield;

Where Scotland’s richts were firmly seal’d

Beside the winding Avon.

Three weeks later, the Covenanter cause came to an end in Lanarkshire at the Battle of Bothwell Bridge, about ten miles (sixteen kilometres) north of Stonehouse. On 20 June 1903, the 224th anniversary of the battle, approximately 25,000 people assembled at the site for a dedication of a monument to commemorate the battle.

== Schools ==
Stonehouse has two primary schools in modern buildings: Stonehouse Primary and Newfield Primary. Both of these schools are within the catchment area of Larkhall Academy, but some children in the village attend Strathaven Academy. The local Catholic primary school is St. Patrick's Primary School in Strathaven.

== Transport ==
=== Roads ===
Stonehouse is on the A71 trunk road, which stretches between Edinburgh and Kilmarnock. A by-pass was constructed around the old village area, re-joining the original route of the A71 near Stonehouse Hospital at the village's Newfield area. Stonehouse is close to the M74 motorway, with a junction at Canderside Toll about 1 mile (2 km) from the village, which provides a link to Glasgow and other Lanarkshire towns to the North and Dumfries and Galloway and England to the South.

=== Buses ===
Stonehouse has regular bus transport to the nearby towns of Larkhall, Hamilton, East Kilbride and Strathaven provided by the Stonehouse-based Whitelaw's Coaches service 254. The bus runs half-hourly on Monday to Saturday daytimes to Hamilton, with each second bus extending to Hairmyres Hospital in East Kilbride. An hourly service runs on evenings and Sundays to Hamilton.

=== Railways ===
The railway was closed in 1965. There are two closed lines at Stonehouse, one to Dalserf and the other to Strathaven. There was a junction in Stonehouse where the Coalburn branch diverged from the line to Strathaven. Today, the nearest railway station for Stonehouse is at Larkhall. South Lanarkshire Council have recently undertaken a feasibility study in order to examine whether the railway from Larkhall could be extended towards Stonehouse; however the major obstacles are the viaduct which whilst the piers remain, the decking was removed in 1984. Also in the mid-1990s the A71 bypass was partially built over the trackbed of the former line.

== Sports ==
=== Alexander Hamilton Memorial Park ===
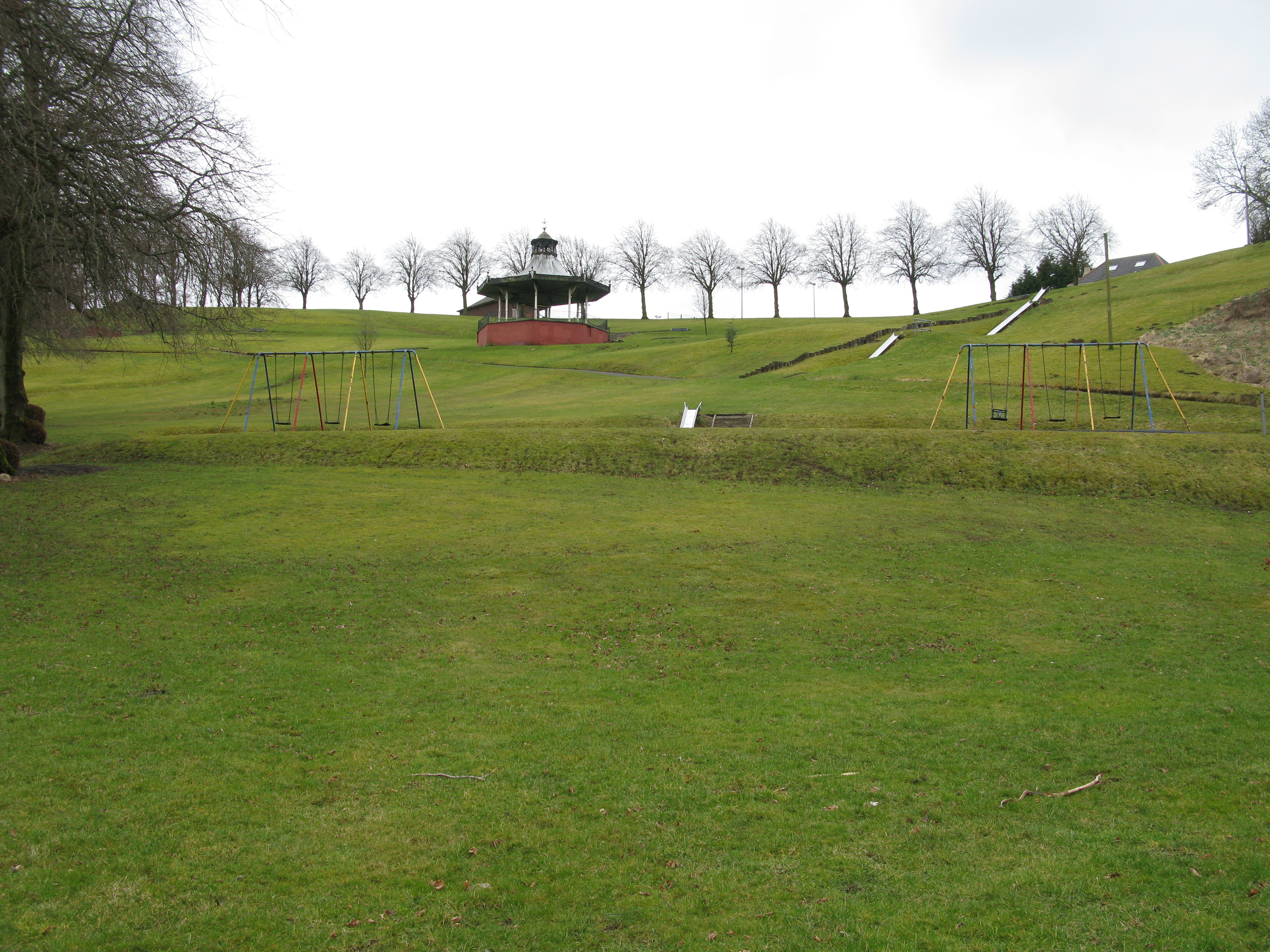
The park with its bandstand and playground equipment

The Alexander Hamilton Memorial Park was opened in 1925, gifted by Alexander Hamilton (from Stonehouse) who made his fortune in carpet manufacture. The distinctive bandstand came from the 1911 Scottish National Exhibition in Glasgow. The park and bandstand look over the Avon Valley.

A long park chute was built into the hillside and was opened in 1933 by Councillor Thomas Wilson but was dismantled in 1967.

Today the park has a floodlit athletics track, football pitch, multi-surface games area as well as woodland walks and various play areas.

=== Tileworks Sports Ground ===
The Tileworks sports ground has a floodlit all weather playing surface designed for football or tennis. The facility also has indoor changing facilities and a full size grass pitch used previously by Stonehouse Violet F.C. and now used by Royal Albert F.C.

=== Stonehouse Bowling Club ===
The bowling club was first formed in 1857 at Loch Hall but later moved to its present location in Vicars Road

== Buildings of interest in Stonehouse ==
=== Churches ===
The town has two main churches - St. Ninian's Church and Paterson United Free Church of Scotland. St. Ninian's Church was built in 1896, replacing the building in New Street which was built in 1772, at a time when the Old Parish Church lacked space. In 1929, after the Union of the Churches, this was renamed to St Ninian's Parish Church of Scotland.

The ruins of the original St Ninian's church are situated within its own cemetery off Manse Road. Religious worship and burial on the site is thought to date back to the 5th century. The oldest gravestone in the yard is a fragment of a medieval burial, dating to the 11th or 12th century. The oldest legible inscription is from 1663.

Paterson United Free Church of Scotland was renamed to honour H. A. Paterson, the church's minister who died in 1901, this church was originally called the United Presbyterian Church and was built in 1879. Prior to this was the church for the Associates Secession or Burgher denomination, which was built nearby in 1796 and existed until 1878.

=== Stonehouse Senior Citizens Hall ===
This hall started life as the Gas Office. It is situated in the village square at Stonehouse Cross and shared the building with Stonehouse Library.

The Stonehouse Library is now situated within the South Lanarkshire Lifestyles Centre on Strathaven Road.

=== Stonehouse Public Institute ===
The institute was formerly the Miners Welfare Hall. It was built in the early 1900s on New Street, close to the cross and is used for a variety of events and concerts. The smaller part of the building was also used as a radio studio, providing a local FM radio station for most of South Lanarkshire.

=== Stonehouse Public Hall ===
This hall was built in the late 19th century at Trongate, close to Stonehouse Cross.

=== South Lanarkshire Lifestyles - Stonehouse ===
The old public buildings were replaced by a new community centre at the edge of town, opened in 2011. It now features a library, café, and learning centre, with rooms that can be booked out for learning and education sessions, as well as local keep-fit and parenting classes.

=== Rex Cinema ===
Opened in Argyle Street in January 1937 by John Edward Sheeran. The former cinema, now a store, was extensively furnished directly from the White Star cruise liner RMS Homeric. Sheeran bought some of the ship's opulent furnishings at a scrap auction in 1935 and adapted them for installation inside the 750 seat picture house. The remaining fittings include several doors, a mahogany staircase, a heavy chandelier, and panelled walls from the first class restaurant.

=== Cemeteries ===
Stonehouse cemetery, which contains the town's war memorial (details above), has the Commonwealth war graves of 8 British service personnel of the World Wars.

Other cemeteries in the village include St. Ninian's Church Cemetery and Glebe Cemetery.

=== War memorial ===
Stonehouse War Memorial is situated in the middle of Stonehouse Cemetery and lists those who died in both World Wars.

WWI soldiers names are on the side that faces the cemetery gates and WWII names are on the opposite side.

The memorial is in the form of a cross on a long shaft which stands on a four tiered octagonal plinth. There is no decoration on either the plinth or cross.

=== Bridges ===
Linthaugh Bridge crosses the Avon water at the bottom of Linthaugh Brae. The bridge was built in 1772. Another notable bridge is Stonehouse Viaduct, only the pillars of which remain.

Thomas Telford built bridge on old A71 over the Cander river, between Stonehouse and Canderside toll. disused but still evident.

== Countryside ==
Two rivers pass through the area - Avon Water and Cander Water. Nearby hills include Grossyet Knowe and Sodom Hill.

=== Cander Moss ===
This reserve is a remnant of a large area of raised bog and is maintained by the Scottish Wildlife Trust. The site is rich with all types of wildlife that can be found in this type of habitat. However, there are no footpaths and access across it is difficult.

== Hospitals ==
Stonehouse Hospital opened in 1896 and provided care for sufferers of tuberculosis and other infectious diseases and was said to be "the best isolation hospital in Scotland". The old Victorian hospital building was demolished and a new hospital opened in May 2004.

== Community groups and organisations ==
=== Stonehouse Community First Response ===
Starting operations from late August 2009, the CFR group for Stonehouse is one of many groups operating in Scotland. The purpose of the group is to provide supplementary emergency medical cover within the area, specifically to allow rapid attendance at instances of things like Cardiac Arrest, Central Chest Pain, Sudden Adult Collapse or Breathing Difficulties. Due to the rural location of the Avondale area, it can sometimes take an ambulance upwards of 10 minutes to attend an incident. In the event of a Cardiac Arrest, ideally you would want a Defib. unit on scene within 5 minutes, preferably sooner. Members of the group are fully trained in the use of Defibrillators, supplemental Oxygen use, Airway management, and various other aspects of Basic Life Support. Community First Responder

The scheme is completely staffed by unpaid volunteers who are dispatched by the Scottish Ambulance Service to appropriate medical emergencies within the areas covered. At the current time, the Stonehouse scheme also covers:- Larkhall, Strathaven, Ashgill, Glassford, Sandford, & anywhere in between. In some circumstances, cover can also be extended to Blackwood/Kirkmuirhill/Boghead (Usually only if the fellow CFR scheme in Lesmahagow area is not on call). At the time of writing (1 September 2010), the first year stats. for the group are over 3500 hours of cover and attendance at over 220 emergency incidents. There are currently 10 members of the group, but new volunteers are always welcome.

=== Stonehouse Heritage Group ===
Stonehouse Heritage Group (SHG) was formed in 1991. It was created by a small group of volunteers. Their first project was the inputting of census information on Stonehouse (Lanarkshire) into a computer database. The first census return to be input was the 1891 census. Search routines were developed so that the data could be easily accessed through a number of options that included Surname, full Name, Address etc. therefore providing an extremely quick search facility. Since then more information has gradually been added. Currently the group has a resource room at the local community hall (Stonehouse Lifestyles, 2 Udston Mill Road, Stonehouse ML9 3JL). Additional information can be found on their own website.

Stonehouse Scouts, Cubs and Beavers

Scouting in Stonehouse had closed in the early-1990s but was restarted in 2014 by a team of local volunteers. Today there is a thriving group providing challenges and activities to boys and girls from age 6 to 14. The groups meet in the Scout and Guide Hall in Lawrie Street with the older group, The Scouts meeting on Monday evening, the Beavers on a Wednesday evening and the Cubs meeting separately on a Friday. There is full information on the groups activities on their own website,

== See also ==
- List of places in South Lanarkshire
