= Wester Moffat Hospital =

- NHS Lanarkshire
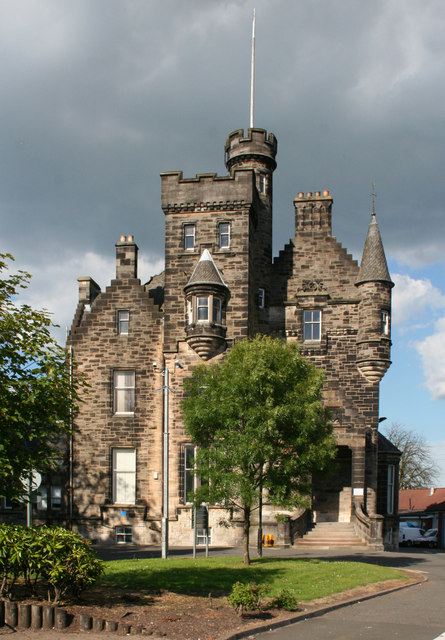
- Wester Moffat House

- Shown in North Lanarkshire

Geography
- Location: Towers Road, Airdrie, North Lanarkshire, Scotland
- Coordinates: 55.8686°N 3.9413°W

Organisation
- Care system: NHS Scotland
- Type: Specialist

Services
- Speciality: Care for the elderly

History
- Founded: 1929 ( as a hospital )

Links
- Lists: Hospitals in Scotland

Wester Moffat Hospital is a health facility in Towers Road, Airdrie, North Lanarkshire, Scotland. It is managed by NHS Lanarkshire. It is a Category B listed building.

== History ==
The building, which was designed by Charles Wilson in the Scottish baronial style for William Towers-Clark, a solicitor, was completed in 1862. It was converted for medical use and re-opened as a sanatorium in January 1929. The facility joined the National Health Service in 1948. Rifleman James Morris, a soldier from the Cameronians (Scottish Rifles), was admitted to the hospital after a car crash in 1962 and spent 54 years there without recovering before his death in 2017.

In March 2022, NHS Lanarkshire purchased land to the east of Wester Moffat for construction of a replacement for University Hospital Monklands. The new hospital was due to be completed by 2031, but, in 2026, ministers refused to sign off the £2.1bn scheme over affordability concerns, creating uncertainty over the target completion date.
