= Coathill Hospital =

- NHS Lanarkshire
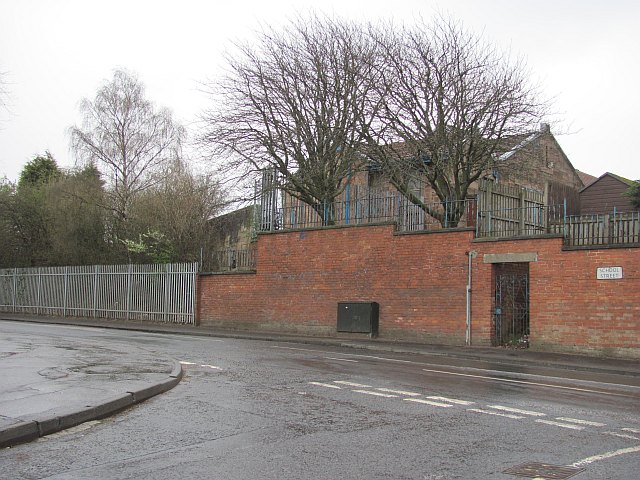
- Part of Coathill Hospital just visible over the wall

- Shown in North Lanarkshire

Geography
- Location: Hospital Street, Coatbridge, North Lanarkshire, Scotland
- Coordinates: 55.8490°N 4.0266°W

Organisation
- Care system: NHS Scotland
- Type: Community

History
- Founded: 1861

Links
- Lists: Hospitals in Scotland

Coathill Hospital is a health facility in Hospital Road, Coatbridge, North Lanarkshire, Scotland. It is managed by NHS Lanarkshire.

== History ==
The facility has its origins in the Old Monkland Poorhouse which was designed by Robert Baird and opened in 1861. A fever hospital was built on the south part of the site in the late 19th century. It became the Old Monkland Home Poor Law Institution in 1930. There were a total of over 50 cases and suspected cases of typhoid fever in the hospital following the outbreak in Coatbridge in summer 1946. The facility joined the National Health Service as Coathill Hospital in 1948.
