= Law Junction railway station =

Disused railway station in Law, South Lanarkshire

Law Junction

General information
- Location: Law, South Lanarkshire; Scotland
- Coordinates: 55.7562°N 3.8772°W
- Grid reference: NS822530
- Platforms: 4

Other information
- Status: Disused

History
- Original company: Caledonian Railway
- Pre-grouping: Caledonian Railway
- Post-grouping: London, Midland and Scottish Railway; British Rail (Scottish Region)

Key dates
- 1 December 1879: Opened
- 4 January 1965: Closed
Location

Law Junction railway station served the village of Law, South Lanarkshire, Scotland from 1879 to 1965 on the Caledonian main line.

== History ==
The station opened on 1 December 1879 by the Caledonian Railway. To the southwest was Shawfield Colliery, which the station was used as a junction for before it opened. There were two signal boxes: one to the north that opened in 1880 and Law Junction South signal box that opened with the station. It later closed in 1897. To the northeast was a goods yard which had a shed and a loading bank, with sidings to the west. In between this and the running line were dead end sidings, with further sidings to the south as well as an eight carriage shed. Shawfield Colliery closed before the Second World War. The station closed on 4 January 1965.

Preceding station	Historical railways	Following station
Carluke; Line and station open	Caledonian main line	Motherwell; Line and station open
