= Cleland Hospital =

- NHS Lanarkshire
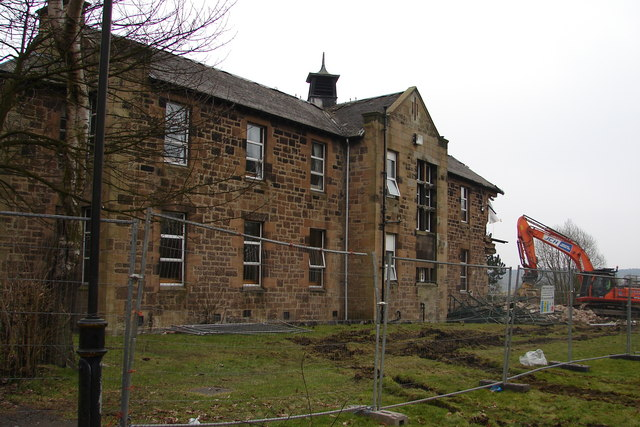
- The old Cleland Hospital being demolished

- Shown in North Lanarkshire

Geography
- Location: Auchinlea Drive, Cleland, North Lanarkshire, Scotland
- Coordinates: 55.8028°N 3.9070°W

Organisation
- Care system: NHS Scotland
- Type: Community

History
- Founded: 1903

Links
- Lists: Hospitals in Scotland

Cleland Hospital is a health facility in Auchinlea Drive, Cleland, North Lanarkshire, Scotland. It is managed by NHS Lanarkshire.

== History ==
The facility has its origins in the Omoa Poorhouse, (Note: The poorhouse was named after the Fort of San Fernando de Omoa which was captured by Colonel William Dalrymple, a local land owner, in 1779 during the American Revolutionary War.) which was designed by Alexander Cullen and opened in 1903. Following closure of the poorhouse in 1939, the buildings were converted for use as a military hospital during the Second World War. The new facility then joined the National Health Service as Cleland Hospital in 1948.

After services had been transferred to a modern community hospital on the east side of the site, the old hospital buildings were demolished in 2008.
