= Udston Hospital =

- NHS Lanarkshire
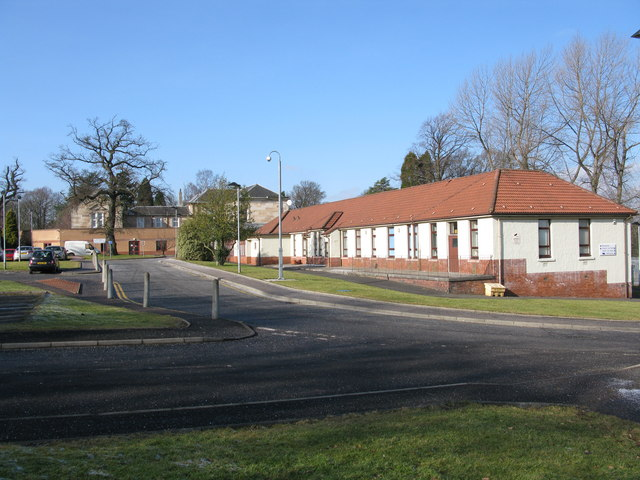
- Udston Hospital

- Shown in South Lanarkshire

Geography
- Location: Farm Road, Hamilton, South Lanarkshire, Scotland
- Coordinates: 55.7777°N 4.0803°W

Organisation
- Care system: NHS Scotland
- Type: Community

History
- Founded: 1919

Links
- Lists: Hospitals in Scotland

Udston Hospital is a health facility in Farm Road, Hamilton, South Lanarkshire, Scotland. It is managed by NHS Lanarkshire.

== History ==
The hospital was created by converting a 19th-century mansion built for Lewis Potter, a director of the City of Glasgow Bank, into an infectious diseases hospital in May 1919. It was expanded in 1930 and, after joining the National Health Service in 1948, it was expanded again in the late 1990s when a large modern extension was built on the site. One of the wards used for elderly patients who were awaiting transfer to a nursing home or a package of homecare, known as Douglas Ward, was closed in 2018.
