= Cleland, North Lanarkshire =

Village in Scotland

Coordinates: 55.80234°N 3.91427°W

Cleland: Scottish Gaelic: Cill Fhaolain
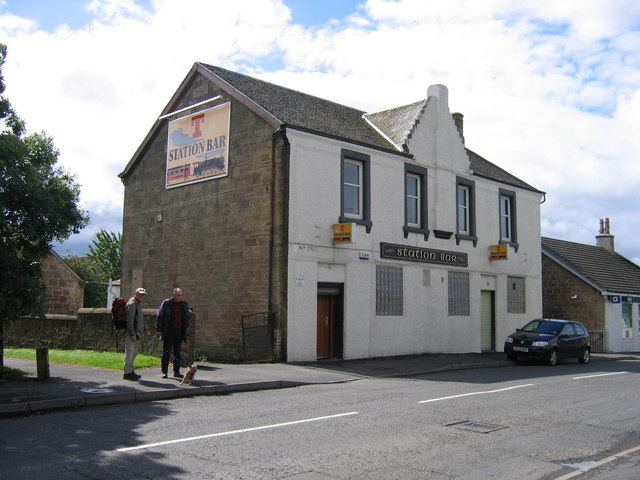
- Station Bar (now closed) in Cleland

- Location within North Lanarkshire
- Population: 3,150 (2020)
- OS grid reference: NS7958
- Council area: North Lanarkshire
- Lieutenancy area: Lanarkshire
- Country: Scotland
- Sovereign state: United Kingdom
- Post town: Motherwell
- Postcode district: ML1
- Dialling code: 01698
- Police: Scotland
- Fire: Scottish
- Ambulance: Scottish
- UK Parliament: Motherwell and Wishaw
- Scottish Parliament: Motherwell and Wishaw

Cleland is a village near Motherwell and Wishaw in North Lanarkshire, Scotland, . As of 2018, it has a population of about 3,000. The village has a strong coal mining heritage, and is a typical example of a working class village in North Lanarkshire and the Glasgow area. Due to its location, despite being at the heart of North Lanarkshire, the village is isolated, geographically and culturally, from surrounding towns such as Motherwell, Shotts and Wishaw.

== Geography ==
The village is about 30 miles (50 kilometres) from Edinburgh and 16 miles (26 kilometres) from Glasgow by train. Geographically, the village of Cleland is roughly bounded by the junction of Cleland Road and Chapleknowe road (B7029) to the west, the junction of Biggar Road and the B7033 Newhouse to the North, the junction of Bellside Road and Carlisle Road (A73) to the East and the junction of Swinstie road and Wishaw high road to the south.

== Schools ==
Cleland is served by two primary schools. St. Mary's is the larger of the two schools with a roll of around 140 (excluding nursery), compared with Cleland Primary's roll of around 90. St Mary's Primary School also includes the nursery which is non-denominational.

The two secondary schools which serve the community are Taylor High School in New Stevenston, and Coltness High School near Wishaw.

== Transport ==
Cleland is situated in close proximity to the M8 motorway, offering road connections to Glasgow and Edinburgh, between and beyond. It is 6 miles (10 km) from the M74 motorway, offering road connections to England and the M6 motorway.

Cleland railway station is situated on Bellside Road and is a stop on the Glasgow - Edinburgh via Shotts Line. It is around a 30-minute journey to Glasgow and an hour to Edinburgh. The trains run every day with a limited service on Sundays.

Several bus services operate into Glasgow, Wishaw, Motherwell and the surrounding areas.

== Governance ==
Cleland is in the Scottish parliamentary constituency of Motherwell and Wishaw, in the Scottish Parliament Region of Central Scotland. The current Member of the Scottish Parliament is Clare Adamson of the Scottish National Party.

Cleland's is also in the UK Parliament constituency of Airdrie & Shotts, and is represented by Kenneth Stevenson of the Scottish Labour Party, who was elected in 2024.

Cleland falls under Ward 20 Murdostoun of North Lanarkshire Council. The current representation is two Labour and two Independent councillors. Louise Roarty of the Scottish Labour Party received the most first preferences votes in Cleland in the 2017 and 2022 Local Elections. As a result, this would suggest that Cleland is a strong Labour supporting area.

== History ==
The first Cleland on record is Alexander Cleland of that Ilk who married a cousin of Sir William Wallace. Their son, James Cleland joined William Wallace in battle in 1296 at Loudonhill; at Stirling in 1297; Falkirk in 1298; Glasgow in 1300; and in France in 1301. James Cleland and his son John Cleland fought at Bannockburn in 1314. For his loyalty and good service, Robert the Bruce gave James Cleland the lands of Calder-clere, now East Calder. The Cleland line later extends down to James Cleland, son of William Cleland of that Ilk. James married a daughter of Lord Somerville in 1450, and their line branches out to be the Clelands of Faskin, Monkland and Gartness. The Cleland family lands were therefore a number of areas which included the present day Cleland village. There was no defined village of Cleland as it is known today. Rather there was a Cleland House where the Cleland family lived, and the land where present day Cleland stands was part of the Cleland family's estate.

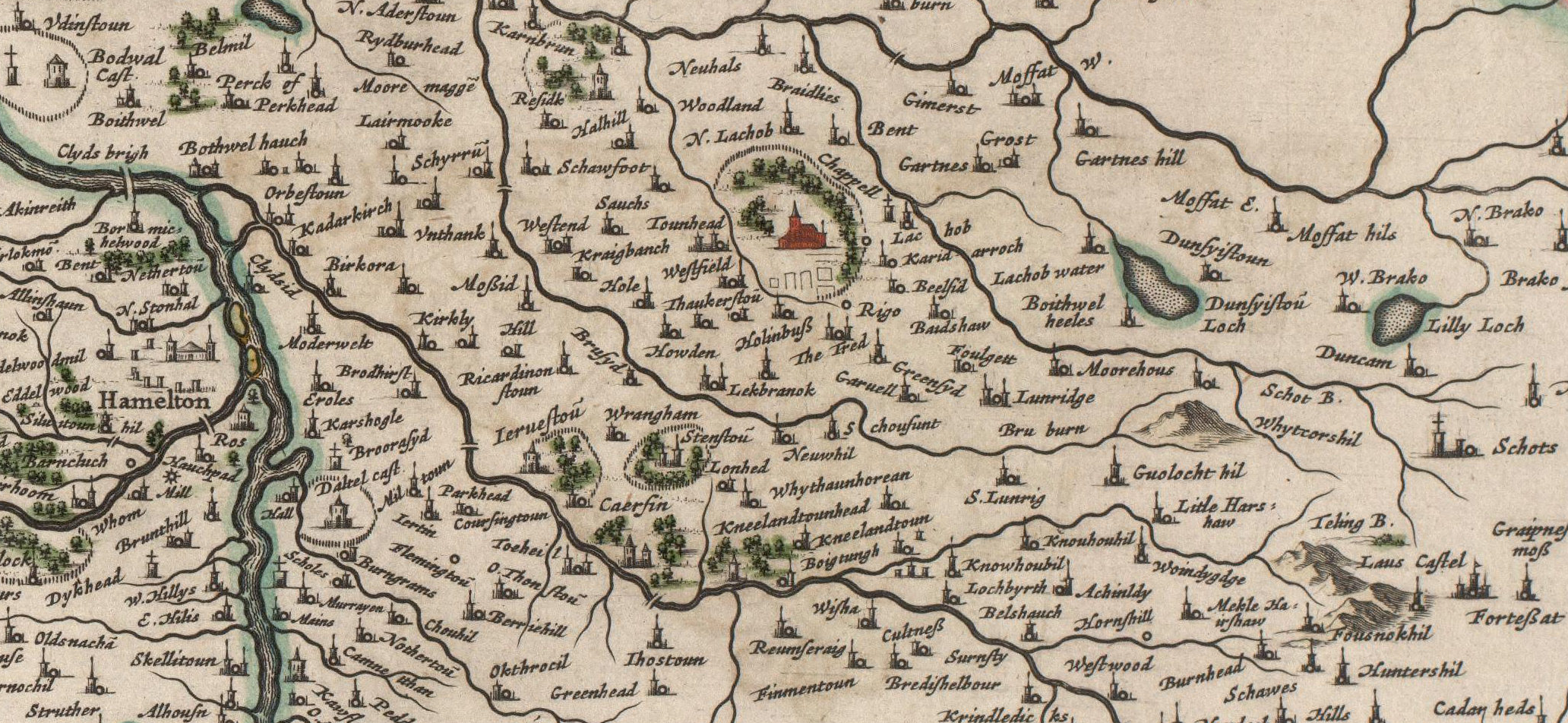
Blaeu's map based on Pont's original "Glasgow and the county of Lanark" map c.1596 depicting Kneelandtounhead and Kneelandtoun to the east of Caerfin.

In 1596 Timothy Pont produced a map of Scotland, showing what is now Lanarkshire, with the places of Kneelandtou and Kneelandtounhead. Kneeland is an archaic alternative name for the Cleland family surname. Over time, Kneeland would eventually become Cleland (and Cleland used to be pronounced as Clee-land in the same way as Knee-land).

The united Presbytery of Hamilton and Lanarkshire had its first meeting at Cleland on 6 September 1687.

In 1702 Alexander Cleland of Cleland found himself in debt and sold the Cleland Estate to William and Archibald Hamilton, who in turn sold to Gavin Hamilton of Inverdovat in 1711. The link between the Cleland families and the Cleland lands was therefore broken. The sale of the Estate was described as follows:

All and Haill [whole] the lands Clelandtoun, called the five pund land of Clelandtoun with the tower and fortalice, &c. – in the barony of Bothwell – All and Haill the fortie shilling land of Little Hareshaw, in the parish of Shotts – All and Haill the lands of Newarthill and Whitagreen – All and Haill the Mains and Mill of Carphinc- Excepting threfra the feu ferm rights if Little Hareshaw.

General Roy's military map of 1755 shows Cleland.

By 1763 the first colliery in what is present day Cleland was in operation at Swinstie, and three years later Alexander Inglis Hamilton of Murdostoun sells Cleland Estate to Captain Hew Dalrymple of Fordal. In 1789 Colonel William Dalrymple (the second son of Sir William Dalrymple, third baronet of Cousland, and the nephew of Captain Hew Dalrymple), distinguishes himself by helping to capture both the Fort of San Fernando de Omoa and the port town of Omoa, in Honduras, Central America. On returning to civilian life Colonel Dalrymple established the Omoa Iron Works on Cleland estate. At first there was only one furnace at Omoa, employing about 40 miners, 40 smelters and other workmen, and 12 horses. The furnace consumed nine tons of calcined ironstone per day, with casts every eighteen hours, yielding about two tons of pig-iron each cast. Omoa claimed to be the second oldest iron works in Scotland (after Wilsontown). The Omoa Waggonway was opened in 1813 from Newarthill collieries to Omoa Iron Works by Colonel Dalrymple. The Omoa Works initially prospered enough to create the new community of Omoa Town.

The procurement of ironstone for the Iron Works was reported as follows:

An interesting circumstance connected with the early history of Omoa, and perhaps applicable to other iron-works at the same period, was the scarcity of ironstone and how it was procured. Any balls found in a stream, or cropping-out by its margin, were carefully collected, and in the case of Omoa, ironstone was collected in streams or otherwise by farmers and others in the neighbourhood, and taken to the ironworks and sold - many a ton went from Shotts parish in this way. The transaction was never called in question, but if practised at the present day, would be called thieving.

Omoa Works changed proprietors several times, the last being to Robert Stewart, Esq., of Murdoston. Stewart reconstructed the works, and acquired a lease to an extensive mineral field, which was found to contain an excellent seam of blackband ironstone, he in the course of a few years acquired a considerable fortune, to which after years of great success were to make great additions. He became a member of Glasgow Town Council in 1842, becoming Lord Provost, 1848–1854, and drove the initiative to supply Glasgow with a freshwater supply from Loch Katrine. In 1856 Mr. Stewart acquired from Mr. Baillie Cochrane, now Lord Lamington, at a cost of £55,000, the estate of Murdostoun, situated in the parish of Shotts, and immediately began to improve it upon an extensive scale. The Omoa Works suffered a downturn through a slump in trade following the outbreak of Civil War in America in 1861. Two years after the death of Robert Stewart in 1866, operations ceased, with the furnaces eventually becoming ruins. Collieries around the present village included Knowenoble, Greenhill, Windyedge, and Spindleside, extracting thick-bedded coals and black-band ironstone

The Coltness Iron Company was established in Newmains by Henry Houldsworth in 1837. It was estimated that the 2,000-acre (8.1 km^{2}) site at Newmains could produce 18,000 tons of coal and 1,000 tons of ironstone per acre. Henry Houldsworth had no difficulty, therefore, in attracting experienced labour from the iron works of Yorkshire as well as from Omoa and Wilsontown in Lanarkshire. The Iron Company, needing coal, was also aware of the coal mines in Ireland. When coal was being mined in Shotts, Cleland and the surrounding areas, the Iron Company sent representatives over to Ireland to hire miners for the Scottish mines. This is a primary reason why so many Irish families came to the area. Many came from County Donegal, and the Castlecomer coal fields in what is now north County Kilkenny and south County Laois. The population of Omoa and Cleland was recorded as 1,233 in 1861: Cleland had 190 males and 175 females; Omoa had 509 males and 359 females.

In 1869 the Omoa and Midcalder Line (Caledonian Railway) was opened. The Omoa and Midcalder Line (Caledonian Railway) to Addiewell followed in 1882. Cleland was served with two railway stations. The first was Omoa Station (across from what is now Cleland Hospital), and the second was Cleland Station (behind what is now Cleland Cross). After Cleland Station was closed, Omoa Station was then renamed Cleland Station.A list of mines under Holytown in this year includes Cleland Collieries owned by Wm. Dixon, Monkland Iron Co., Trustees of late Robert Stewart; Wyndedge owned by Robert Dick. The Omoa Fireclay Works, a brickworks, opened in 1870.

In 1871 the population of Cleland and Omoa had fallen to 819, but by 1881 it was 1,626. The Cleland and Omoa Public School opened in 1876, and in 1877 St Mary's Roman Catholic Church, a Free Church, and a Chapel of Ease were all established.

In 1885 the Ordnance Gazetteer of Scotland recorded:

Cleland, a village of N Lanarkshire, chiefly in Shotts parish, but also partly in Bothwell. With a station on the Morningside branch of the Caledonian, it stands near the left bank of South Calder Water, 3¾ miles [6 km] ESE of Holytown, 7 [miles; 11 km] E of Bothwell village, and 3½ [miles; 5.6 km] E by N of Motherwell, under which it has a post office. It mainly depends on the large neighbouring collieries of the Omoa and Cleland Coal and Iron Company; at it are an Established chapel of ease (1877), a Free church, and St Mary's Roman Catholic church (1877), to the last of which, designed by Messrs Peyin, a presbytery was added in 1881. Cleland and Omoa public school and Cleland Roman Catholic school, with respective accommodation for 300 and 254 children, had (1880) an average attendance of 199 and 240, and grants of £190, 7s. 2d. and £182. Pop. (1861) 1233, (1871) 819, (1881) 1626.

As the Gazetteer suggests, Omoa and Cleland were separate villages, and parts of Omoa and Cleland villages came under the District of West Shotts, and the remainder came under the District of Bothwell. However, both were within the Parish of Cleland.

Further industrial ventures included the Omoa Greenhill Works brickworks (1889–1915), and the Cleland Pottery (1895–1911), the latter across the small gorge from Lithgow Drive. An inspection report for 1896 records the following coal mines in Cleland and Omoa:

- Beggarford, Omoa owned by Robert Young's Trustees, Greenhill, by Holytown;
- Brownhill, Cleland owned by Barr and Higgins, 75, Bothwell St., Glasgow;
- Greenhill, Omoa owned by Robert Young's Trustees, Greenhill, by Holytown;
- Hareshaw, Omoa owned by Hareshaw Coal Co., Cleland;
- Knownoble, Cleland owned by Kerr and Mitchell, Glencleland, Wishaw;
- Knownoblehill, Cleland owned by Robert Dick, Cleland;
- Murdostoun, Cleland owned by John McAndrew and Co., Cleland; and
- Sunnyside, Cleland owned by Coltness Iron Co. Ltd., Newmains.

Cleland Poorhouse opened in 1905. Cleland streets were named and houses numbered in 1906. When built, Lithgow Drive was named after Dr Lithgow, and Gibb Street was named after the mid-wife Mrs Gibb, who both served Omoa and Cleland.

The Annual Report of the County & District Medical Officer for Lanarkshire, 1910, describes Omoa Square:

This group of 114 single-apartment and 24 two-apartment houses, is situated in the Parish of Shotts. These houses were inspected by the Committee on 27 September, and have since been the subject of considerable correspondence and several meetings. A specification, showing the repairs necessary to make the houses reasonably fit for human habitation, was prepared and submitted to the proprietors' agents, who replied that the suggestions were extremely expensive and far beyond any reasonable requirement, and asking a meeting at the property. At this meeting the proprietor was strongly urged to provide domestic and sanitary conveniences of an approved type for the front one-storey block as an experiment in the first instance, but his agent objected very strongly to these proposals, on the ground that the expense was not warranted and the class of tenants would not make proper use of the conveniences. He, however, promised to consider the matter further. No definite proposals were put forward for the improvement of the housing conditions, and to facilitate matters I was afterwards instructed by the Committee to submit a Representation under the Housing Acts.

"The Housing Condition of Miners" Report by the Medical Officer of Health, Dr John T. Wilson, 1910, summarises the Square as:

Originally built by Omoa Iron and Coal Co, but now privately owned. The houses are occupied by miners employed at Cleland, Howmuir, Westwood, Murdostoun and quarrymen employed at Auchinlea – 114 houses of one apartment, rental, £5 4s. and £6 10s; and 24 houses of two-apartments, rental £7 16s and £10 8s – one story, brick – erected about 70 years ago – no damp - roof course – plastered on solid – brick floors, some floors cement – internal surfaces of walls and ceilings irregular, broken and patched – walls mostly damp – several houses unoccupied.

- No overcrowding – apartments large.
- No gardens – one wash house in centre of square – coal cellars recently erected for each house, but many have been broken down by tenants.
- 7 privy midden, in centre of square, in rear and in front, at distances of 20 feet (6.1 m) to 30 yards (27 m); doors and windows of these have been destroyed.
- No sinks – drainage by surface channels.
- Gravitation water from standpipes in centre and back of square, from 2 to 10 yards (1.8 to 9.1 m) distant.

These houses have been frequently inspected, and sanitary improvements have been carried out with no satisfactory results.

Notes on Omoa Square - Closing order made under Section 17 of Housing &c Act, 19. Partly demolished.

By 1910, the Square's houses were semi-abandoned and considered not properly fit for human habitation, with a recommendation for demolition. In the 1920s, hardship led to many Cleland families leaving for other mining areas or emigrating to America and Canada. In 1930 a police census records a population of 4,274, made up of 2,240 males and 2,030 females, though this shows a reduction of 552 compared with the census taken in 1928. In 1930 the Wishaw and Coltness Railway was closed to freight between Newmains and Cleland Junction, and to passengers between Morningside and Holytown (Cleland Junction). What is now Cleland Station collapsed, due to a local mine running under it caving in. It required major repairs before re-opening.

In 1934 Cleland War Memorial was erected after public subscription, to the memory of the men of Cleland and District who fell in the Great War 1914–1918. Electricity was supplied to Cleland in 1934–35. Cleland Public Park opened to celebrate the Silver Jubilee of King George V in May 1935. Further railway closures included the Airdrie and Newhouse Line (Caledonian Railway) Chapelhall to Bellside (1966), and the Cleland (previously Omoa) and Midcalder Line (Caledonian Railway) Polkemmet Colliery line, which was lifted in 1986.

== Sources ==
1. Historic Notices and Domestic History of the Parish of Shotts, by William Grossart, published by Aird and Coghill in 1880 (copy available in North Lanarkshire Heritage Centre).
2. Old Newmains and the Villages Around Wishaw, by Lewis Hutton, published by Stenlake Publishing in 1999 (copy available in North Lanarkshire Heritage Centre). This book also has 11 photographs of Cleland from around 1900, including Omoa Square, Omoa Road (showing horse carriages), Main Street at Cleland Cross and at the Post Office, Bellside Road, Aldersyde/ Biggar Road and Fraser Street in Parkside, and Omoa Poorhouse.
3. Images of Scotland: Wishaw, Compiled Helen Moir, Published by Tempus Publishing Limited (copy available in North Lanarkshire Heritage Centre). This has one photograph of Cleland - a photograph of Chassels Old Castle Bar (what is now Kelly's Bar) from around 1905.
4. The Wishaw Herald (microfilm available in North Lanarkshire Heritage Centre).
5. The Wishaw Press and Advertiser (microfilm available in North Lanarkshire Heritage Centre).
6. Ordnance Survey Old Maps
7. The Scottish Pottery Society
8. Scottish Mining
9. RailScot Railway History
10. The National Archives of Scotland
11. The National Library of Scotland
12. The Workhouse
13. Statistical Accounts of Scotland: 1791–1799; and 1843–45
14. A Musical History of Shotts (copy available in North Lanarkshire Heritage Centre).
15. "Lanark's Mining Industry in 1896 – A List of Coal Mines" from Peak District Mines Historical Society Ltd
