= University Hospital Monklands =

- NHS Lanarkshire
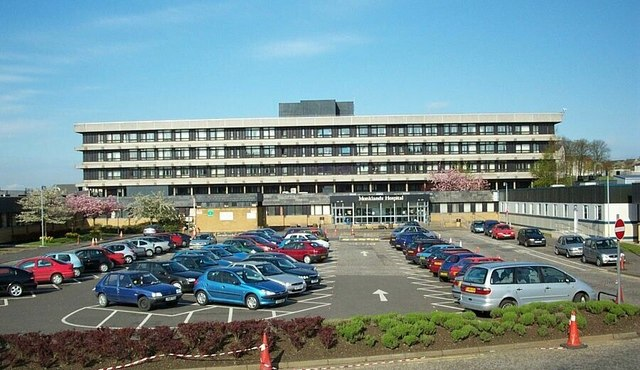
- University Hospital Monklands showing the Main Entrance

- Shown in North Lanarkshire

Geography
- Location: Airdrie, North Lanarkshire, Scotland
- Coordinates: 55°51′57″N 3°59′55″W

Organisation
- Care system: NHS Scotland
- Type: District General

Services
- Emergency department: Yes
- Beds: 535

History
- Founded: 1977

Links
- Website: www.nhslanarkshire.co.uk/Hospitals/Monklands/Pages/default.aspx
- Lists: Hospitals in Scotland

University Hospital Monklands is a district general hospital in Airdrie, North Lanarkshire, Scotland. It serves a population of approximately 260,000 people of North and South Lanarkshire council areas and is managed by NHS Lanarkshire.

== History ==
Sir John Wilson, a businessman and local politician, bequeathed the land to the people of Airdrie and it became the local maternity hospital (Airdrie House Maternity Home Hospital) in 1919. The facility closed as a maternity hospital in 1962 and was completely demolished in 1964.

Originally planned as Airdrie District General Hospital, following a local council reorganisation, the new acute hospital on the site became known as Monklands District General Hospital. Although some hospital departments, including the College of Nursing were open by 1974, the hospital did not become fully operational until 1977.

In April 2006 NHS Lanarkshire issued its 'Picture of Health' document suggested the downgrading to two consultant-led A&E departments, with a choice between Monklands Hospital and Hairmyres Hospital for downgrading. The level two hospital would have a nurse-led Minor Injuries Unit, along with planned surgery, full diagnostic/outpatient services and general medicine. Eventually, Monklands was earmarked for downgrading. This would have resulted in NHS Lanarkshire having consultant-led accident and emergency departments only at Wishaw General Hospital and Hairmyres Hospital in East Kilbride.

The decision to downgrade was widely criticised, with the former Home Secretary, John Reid MP, voicing his disapproval of the plans. In September 2006, the plan was approved by Lewis MacDonald, Deputy Health and Community Care minister. In May 2007, the Labour administration lost out to the Scottish National Party in the 2007 Scottish Parliament election and the decision was overturned by the new Cabinet Secretary for Health and Wellbeing, Nicola Sturgeon. She demanded that NHS Lanarkshire find a way of keeping three fully functioning consultant-led A+E departments in Lanarkshire. In 2009 NHS Lanarkshire developed seven possible combinations of keeping three A+E departments open; these were subsequently delivered for public scrutiny.

In December 2013 it emerged that Healthcare Improvement Scotland figures showed the hospital had recorded a higher than predicted mortality rate in 18 of the previous 27 quarterly reports. The Academy of Medical Royal Colleges and Faculties in Scotland produced a report entitled "Learning from serious failings in care" in July 2015. They found above-average mortality rates at the hospital and called on NHS Lanarkshire to make widespread improvements.

In November 2017, NHS Lanarkshire renamed all three acute hospitals in the local area to reflect their new university teaching status.

A new hospital to replace Monklands, on a site adjacent to the existing Wester Moffat Hospital elderly care facility, was due to be completed by 2031. However, in 2026, ministers refused to sign off the £2.1 billion scheme over affordability concerns, creating uncertainty over the target completion date.

== Facilities ==
Monklands Hospital aerial view circa 1980

Collectively, Airdrie, Coatbridge, and their surrounding villages were once referred to as Monklands. Monklands District Council was the local government district until the abolition of the two-tier local government system and creation of unitary authorities in 1996 with the passing of the Local Government (Scotland) Act 1973.

Monklands hospital can be described as a medium-sized general hospital, apart from wards 1 and 2, all the hospital wards and departments are 'under one roof'. Wards 1 and 2 are reached through a glass tunnel. The hospital is distinctive in that it has two towers, one predominantly medical wards, the other surgical. The towers are six floors each, with a lower ground level, a ground and four floors above that. The lower ground contains the canteen, the pharmacy and the mortuary.
