= University Hospital Hairmyres =

- NHS Lanarkshire
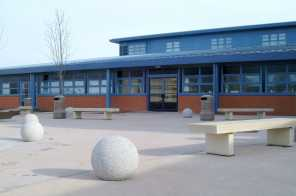
- University Hospital Hairmyres - East Kilbride

- Shown in South Lanarkshire

Geography
- Location: East Kilbride, South Lanarkshire, Scotland, United Kingdom
- Coordinates: 55°45′35″N 4°13′14″W

Organisation
- Care system: NHS Scotland
- Type: District General
- Affiliated university: University of Glasgow Medical School

Services
- Emergency department: Yes Accident & Emergency
- Beds: 492 Inpatient, 20 Day Case

History
- Founded: 1919

Links
- Website: www.nhslanarkshire.scot.nhs.uk/hospitals/university-hospital-hairmyres/
- Lists: Hospitals in Scotland

University Hospital Hairmyres is a district general hospital in the Hairmyres neighbourhood of East Kilbride, South Lanarkshire, Scotland. The hospital serves one of the largest elderly populations in Scotland. It is managed by NHS Lanarkshire.

== History ==
=== Early history ===
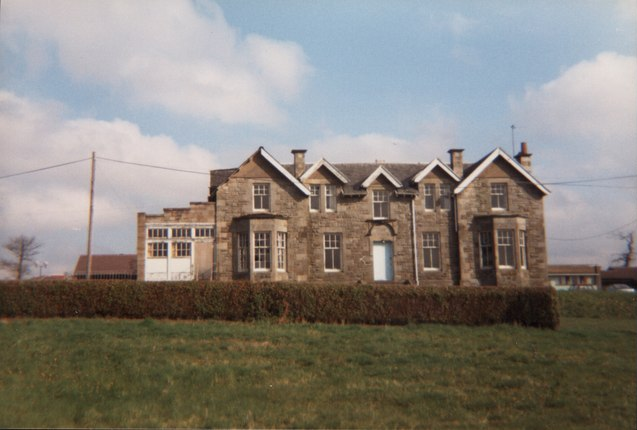
The Lanarkshire Inebriate Reformatory

The first building on the site was the Lanarkshire Inebriate Reformatory, formally opened on 1 December 1904. Only a handful of patients received treatment over the years, and the Reformatory closed in February 1911.

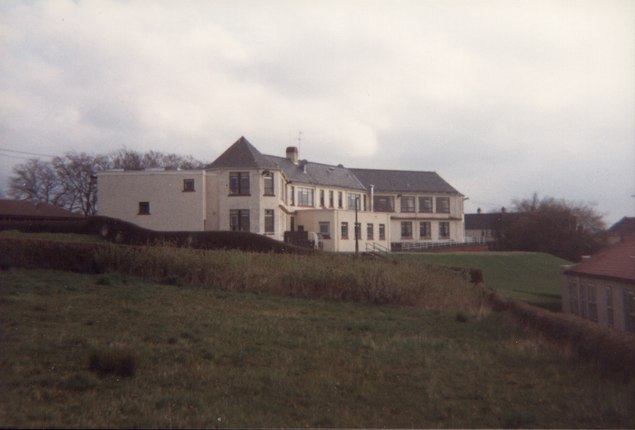
Tuberculosis Ward

Lanarkshire County Council purchased a nearby farm and established a tuberculosis sanatorium and working farm colony. The Hairmyres site was well suited, being accessible from major centres of population, yet set in a hillside over 500 feet above sea level and with its own supply of fresh food. Building started in December 1914 and continued through the First World War, with local workmen being assisted by German prisoners of war. The Secretary for Scotland, Sir Robert Munro conducted the official opening on 14 June 1919. The new buildings were in a crescent formation, facing south for maximum exposure to sunlight.

The buildings comprised a male, female and children's pavilion and an observation block. A two-storey administration block contained the matron's and medical superintendent's offices, pharmacy, staff dining rooms and the matron's, nurses' and maids' living quarters. The former reformatory building was converted for use as a school. There were a total of 250 beds at Hairmyres. The farm colony gave practical training in outdoor occupations to the recuperating patients. The farm had a herd of tuberculin-tested Ayrshire cows, supplying milk butter and a source of income from the sale of calves. There was also a poultry farm and a piggery.

During the 1930s the site was expanded to provide a 400-bed general hospital, including an orthopaedic department. By the end of the decade there was a new treatment block that included two operating theatres, a radiology department, two gymnasia and a new pharmacy. A new nurses' home was opened in 1937. In 1938 there were seven sisters, eight staff nurses, three assistant nurses and forty-one probationers.

=== Second World War ===
In 1938, the government established an Emergency Medical Service (E.M.S.) for the expected influx of military and civilian casualties from the anticipated war with Germany. Hairmyres, with its rural location yet good road and rail links was considered an ideal site. Between April 1939 and January 1941 18 new huts were built, with wards containing nearly 400 new beds. A new ward in the old reformatory building, gave Hairmyres a total of 1,090 beds. The first major influx of war casualties came in 1940. Servicemen from Britain, France, Poland, Canada, New Zealand and Australia were patients, with a small number of wounded German and Italian prisoners of war. On 7 January 1942, a Canadian Orthopaedic Unit was established at Hairmyres. This unit, funded by the Canadian Red Cross, occupied wards 9, 10 and 11 and was run by Canadian nurses. Between 14 January 1942 and 18 September 1945, the unit admitted a total of 5,090 patients and carried out 2,347 operations. Post war, the Scottish Hospitals' Survey recommended that Hairmyres should continue as a general hospital with 750 beds, with a proportion of beds for treating tuberculosis and chest diseases.

Tuberculosis sanatoria concentrated on therapy involving a nutritious diet, exposure to fresh air and sunshine and graduated physical exercise. The antibiotic, streptomycin was discovered in the US in 1942. It enabled previously ill patients to be made fit for surgery. The first patient to receive streptomycin in Scotland, was author and journalist, George Orwell. Orwell was admitted to Hairmyres shortly before Christmas in 1947. At the time of his admission he was writing his novel Nineteen Eighty-Four. The staff, insisting that complete physical and mental rest was essential for effective treatment, confiscated his typewriter. With rest, his health improved to some extent but attempts to rest his badly affected lung by simple surgical procedures were not successful. He suffered severe side effects from his treatment, and although the disease was responding, it had to be stopped after fifty days. The remaining supplies of streptomycin were administered, with success, to two other patients. Orwell spent the remainder of his stay writing, walking in the grounds and playing croquet. In July 1948 he returned to his rented house on Jura but his health gradually deteriorated and he moved to a sanatorium in the Cotswolds and died in January 1950 in University College Hospital, London, aged 46.

=== Post war ===
On 5 July 1948 Hairmyres Hospital was transferred to the Western Regional Hospital Board, one of five regional boards created in Scotland under the National Health Service (Scotland) Act 1947. In the years following the war, there was little investment in hospital buildings in Britain. Plans to upgrade Hairmyres to District General Hospital status were shelved. By 1950 the number of beds had fallen to 450, about two-thirds of the number envisaged in the 1945 survey. The New Town of East Kilbride was established in 1947 within one mile (two kilometres) of Hairmyres Hospital, creating an increasing demand. The 1966 Lanarkshire Hospital Development Plan proposed two district hospitals in Lanarkshire, one in Motherwell and the other in Airdrie. There were no major development plans for Hairmyres. However, the hospital was to continue to have acute admitting facilities with "a functional relationship" with a Glasgow teaching hospital. This dependence was felt to be unsatisfactory by staff. Hairmyres had to wait until the establishment of Lanarkshire Health Board before any major redevelopment could begin.

On 1 April 1974 the National Health Service (Scotland) Act 1972 created fifteen new health boards in place of regional boards, hospital boards of management, executive councils and local government health authorities. Over the following years, the new Lanarkshire Health Board transformed the status of Hairmyres to the advantage of the local community. During the 1970s, 80s and 90s they invested in both staff and facilities. An increase in specialisation meant patients no longer had to travel to one of the Glasgow teaching hospitals for treatment. The board opened a new gymnasium, new clinical laboratories, a cardiac investigation and a bronchoscopy unit.

On 1 April 1994 Hairmyres Hospital acquired trust status and the redevelopment of the hospital on the ground behind the Nurses' Home began. The hospital was totally rebuilt into a modern purpose built District General Hospital, with special expertise in Respiratory and Cardiac Care, and an expanded day-care/ambulatory surgery service. It has also built up new services, including Cardiac Catheterisation, Psychiatry and Elderly care.

A new hospital, to be known as the University Hospital Hairmyres but known simply as "Hairmyres" by local residents, was procured under a private finance initiative contract in 1998. The new hospital buildings were built by the Kier Group at a cost of £67.5 million. Building work began in May 1998 and completed by February 2001. Services were moved into the new building in March 2001 and the hospital officially opened by Henry McLeish in September 2001.

In April 2006 NHS Lanarkshire issued its 'Picture of Health' document suggested the downgrading to two consultant-led A&E departments, with a choice between Monklands Hospital and Hairmyres Hospital for downgrading. The level two hospital would have a nurse-led Minor Injuries Unit, along with planned surgery, full diagnostic/outpatient services and general medicine. Eventually, Monklands was earmarked for downgrading. This would have resulted in NHS Lanarkshire having consultant-led accident and emergency departments only at Wishaw General Hospital and Hairmyres Hospital in East Kilbride.

The decision to downgrade was widely criticised, with the former Home Secretary, John Reid MP, voicing his disapproval of the plans. In September 2006, the plan was approved by Lewis MacDonald, Deputy Health and Community Care minister. In May 2007, the Labour administration lost out to the Scottish National Party in the 2007 Scottish Parliament election and the decision was overturned by the new Cabinet Secretary for Health and Wellbeing, Nicola Sturgeon. She demanded that NHS Lanarkshire find a way of keeping three fully functioning consultant-led A+E departments in Lanarkshire. In 2009 NHS Lanarkshire developed seven possible combinations of keeping three A+E departments open; these were subsequently delivered for public scrutiny.

In November 2017, NHS Lanarkshire renamed all three of its acute hospitals - Hairmyres, Monklands and Wishaw General - with the prefix 'University Hospital' to reflect their new university teaching status.

== Services ==
The hospital serves patients in the South Lanarkshire catchment area. It is one of three acute hospitals in NHS Lanarkshire. The hospital has 492 inpatient beds and 20 day beds, employing 2500 members of staff. Services include 24-hour Accident and Emergency, General Medicine, Oncology, Psychiatry, Care of the Elderly, General Surgery, Orthopaedics, and Vascular Surgery.
