= Stonehouse Hospital =

- NHS Lanarkshire
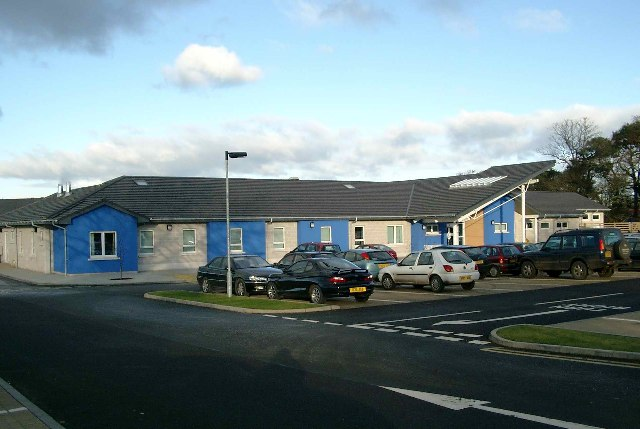
- Stonehouse Hospital

- Shown in South Lanarkshire

Geography
- Location: Strathaven Road, Stonehouse, South Lanarkshire, Scotland
- Coordinates: 55.6925°N 3.9918°W

Organisation
- Care system: NHS Scotland
- Type: Community

History
- Founded: 1896

Links
- Lists: Hospitals in Scotland

Stonehouse Hospital is a health facility in Strathaven Road, Stonehouse, South Lanarkshire, Scotland. It is managed by NHS Lanarkshire.

== History ==
The original facility, which was designed by Alexander Cullen as an infectious diseases hospital, was completed in 1896. It was expanded in 1916 and, after joining the National Health Service in 1948, it became a community hospital. A modern low-rise facility was procured under the private finance initiative in 2001. The new facility, which was built by Dawn Construction at a cost of £4.3 million, was completed in 2004.
