= Kilsyth Victoria Cottage Hospital =

- NHS Lanarkshire
- Shown in North Lanarkshire

Geography
- Location: Glasgow Road, Kilsyth, North Lanarkshire, Scotland
- Coordinates: 55.9767°N 4.0701°W

Organisation
- Care system: NHS Scotland
- Type: Community

History
- Founded: 1903

Links
- Lists: Hospitals in Scotland

Kilsyth Victoria Cottage Hospital is a health facility in Glasgow Road, Kilsyth, North Lanarkshire, Scotland. It is managed by NHS Lanarkshire.

== History ==
The facility was intended to commemorate the diamond jubilee of Queen Victoria and was commissioned to treat workers who had suffered accidents in the local mines. It was financed by the miners themselves, designed by Ronald Walker in the Arts and Crafts style and opened by Sir Archibald Edmonstone in April 1903. The facility joined the National Health Service in 1948 and was extended in 1974. A plaque was erected at the front of the building to commemorate its centenary in April 2003.
