= Kirklands Hospital =

Mental health hospital in South Lanarkshire, Scotland

- NHS Lanarkshire
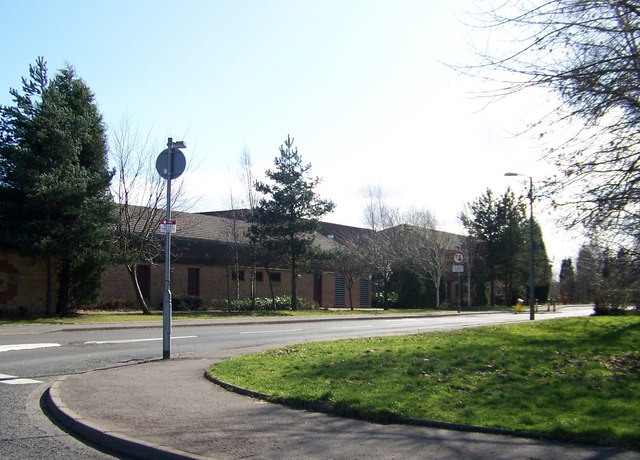
- Kirklands Hospital

- Shown in South Lanarkshire

Geography
- Location: Bothwell, South Lanarkshire, Scotland
- Coordinates: 55.81174°N 4.06423°W

Organisation
- Care system: NHS Scotland
- Type: Psychiatric hospital

Services
- Emergency department: No

History
- Founded: 1871

Links
- Lists: Hospitals in Scotland

Kirklands Hospital is a mental health facility and Headquarters of NHS Lanarkshire in Bothwell, Scotland. It is managed by NHS Lanarkshire.

== History ==
The hospital, which was designed by Thomas Halket, was established by Dr William Dean Fairless as a private psychiatric facility for the "upper and middle classes" and opened as the Bothwell Asylum in June 1871. It was acquired by the Glasgow District Board of Lunacy in 1879 and, after being significantly expanded in the Scottish baronial style, reopened as the Kirklands District Asylum in 1881. It became Kirklands Mental Hospital in the 1920s and then joined the National Health Service as Kirklands Hospital in 1948.

After the introduction of Care in the Community in the early 1980s, the hospital went into a period of decline and the old buildings were replaced by smaller modern assessment and treatment facilities. Since 2010, the site has also been used by NHS Lanarkshire as their headquarters and medical training centre.
