= Kello Hospital =

- NHS Lanarkshire
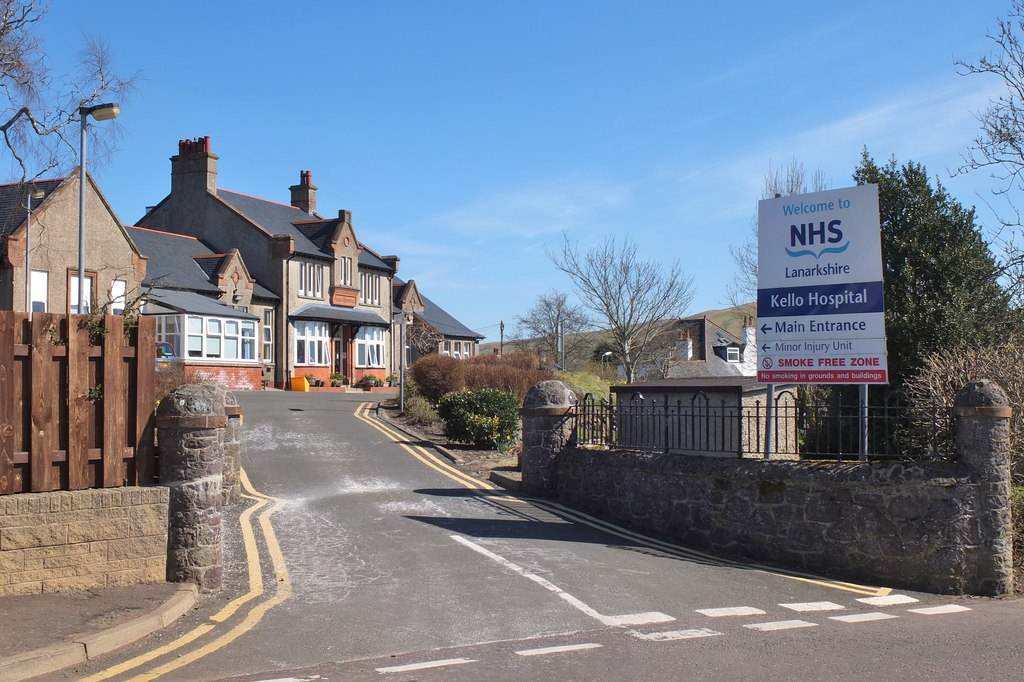
- Kello Hospital

- Shown in South Lanarkshire

Geography
- Location: John's Loan, Biggar, South Lanarkshire, Scotland
- Coordinates: 55.6226°N 3.5206°W

Organisation
- Care system: NHS Scotland
- Type: Community

History
- Founded: 1926

Links
- Lists: Hospitals in Scotland

Kello Hospital is a health facility in John's Loan, Biggar, South Lanarkshire, Scotland. It is managed by NHS Lanarkshire.

== History ==
The facility, which was financed by a legacy from Simon Linton Kello, a local bank manager, and his sister, was completed in November 1926. It was expanded in 1937 and, after joining the National Health Service in 1948, it was extended again in 1967. A significant number of patients were transferred from Lockart Hospital when that hospital was unable to recruit any clinical staff in 2016.
