= Obstetric Flying Squad =

Emergency mobile obstetrics team

An Obstetric Flying Squad is a form of medical retrieval team that is composed of an obstetrician, anaesthetist, midwife and other healthcare personnel who are on-call to attend to mothers with major obstetric complications occurring in the community.

== History ==
The idea of having an Obstetric Flying Squad was suggested by Professor E Farquhar Murray who wrote that "instead of rushing a shocked and collapsed patient to hospital for nursing and specialist aid, the specialist and nurse should be rushed to the patient" (see Liang reference below). In the United Kingdom in the 1930s, the majority of births occurred in the home.

The first organised obstetric flying squad was started by H. J. Thomson in Bellshill, Lanarkshire, Scotland in 1933 to provide emergency back-up to general practitioners and midwives involved in home births.

The commonest major problems dealt with by the squad were:

- major post-partum haemorrhage
- retained placenta
- obstructed labour

The mothers were frequently severely shocked and the baby was also likely to be in a precarious position. Many lives were saved during the early years of operation of the service. Other countries with high home-birth rates subsequently copied the idea and set up similar services.

In most developed countries the majority of births now occur in hospitals and the ambulance services are well-developed, so the need for the service is extremely low. Less than 1% of births in the UK now occur in the home. The priority now is for rapid transport of distressed mothers to a hospital.

The original aim was to primarily manage obstetric complications on site, then secondarily transport the mother and child to hospital. This gradually evolved into primary on-site resuscitation than rapid transport to definitive care in a hospital. The concept of a hospital medical team going to retrieve patients continues in the concept of trauma retrieval teams.

== Team composition and equipment ==
The flying squad typically consisted of an obstetrician, anaesthetist, midwife, and a helper such as a hospital orderly. The service was activated following a phone call for assistance, and the team members would 'fly' (meaning 'travel quickly') to the scene.

The anaesthetic equipment initially was quite simple and consisted of a Schimmelbusch mask to administer chloroform. Later more sophisticated equipment was used. Of great importance was intravenous infusion equipment, intravenous fluids and later the provision of group O blood.
