= University Hospital Wishaw =

- NHS Lanarkshire
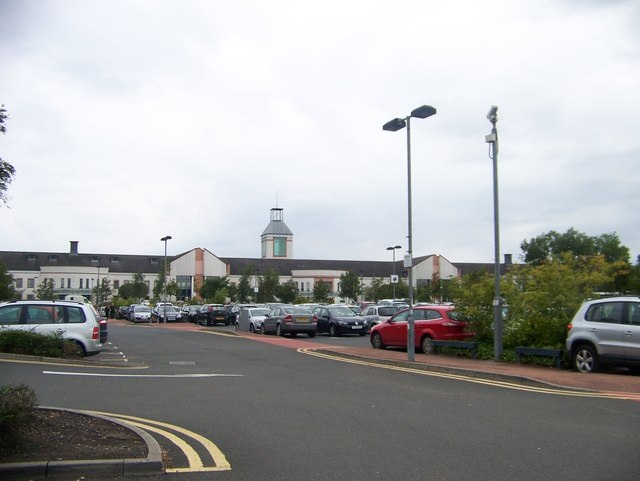
- University Hospital Wishaw

- Shown in North Lanarkshire

Geography
- Location: Wishaw, North Lanarkshire, Scotland, United Kingdom
- Coordinates: 55°46′25″N 3°56′31″W

Organisation
- Care system: NHS Scotland
- Type: District General

Services
- Emergency department: Yes: Accident and Emergency
- Beds: 633

History
- Founded: 29 May 2001

Links
- Website: Wishaw General Hospital
- Lists: Hospitals in Scotland

University Hospital Wishaw (formerly known as Wishaw General Hospital) is a district general hospital in Wishaw, North Lanarkshire, situated between the areas of Craigneuk to the north and Netherton to the south. The hospital, managed by NHS Lanarkshire, is 11 miles (18 kilometres) southeast of Glasgow.

== History ==
The hospital was procured under a Private Finance Initiative contract to replace the ageing Law Hospital in November 1998. The works, which were designed by the Percy Thomas Partnership and undertaken by Sir Robert McAlpine at a cost of £100 million, were completed in February 2001. The hospital was fully operation by the end of May 2001.

In April 2006, NHS Lanarkshire issued its 'Picture of Health' document suggested the downgrading to two consultant-led A&E departments, with a choice between Monklands Hospital and Hairmyres Hospital for downgrading. The level two hospital would have a nurse-led Minor Injuries Unit, along with planned surgery, full diagnostic/outpatient services and general medicine. Eventually, Monklands Hospital was earmarked for downgrading. This would have resulted in NHS Lanarkshire having consultant-led accident and emergency departments only at Wishaw General Hospital and Hairmyres Hospital in East Kilbride.

The decision to downgrade the hospital was widely criticised, with the former Home Secretary, John Reid MP, voicing his disapproval of the plans. In September 2006, the plan was approved by Lewis MacDonald, Deputy Health and Community Care minister. In May 2007, the Labour administration lost out to the Scottish National Party in the 2007 Scottish Parliament election and the decision was overturned by the new Cabinet Secretary for Health and Wellbeing, Nicola Sturgeon. She demanded that NHS Lanarkshire find a way of keeping three fully functioning consultant-led A+E departments in Lanarkshire. In 2009, NHS Lanarkshire developed seven possible combinations of keeping three A+E departments open; these were subsequently delivered for public scrutiny.

In 2014, an Intensive Psychiatry Care Unit (IPCU) opened at the hospital. In November 2017, NHS Lanarkshire renamed all three acute hospitals in the local area to reflect their new university teaching status.

== Facilities ==
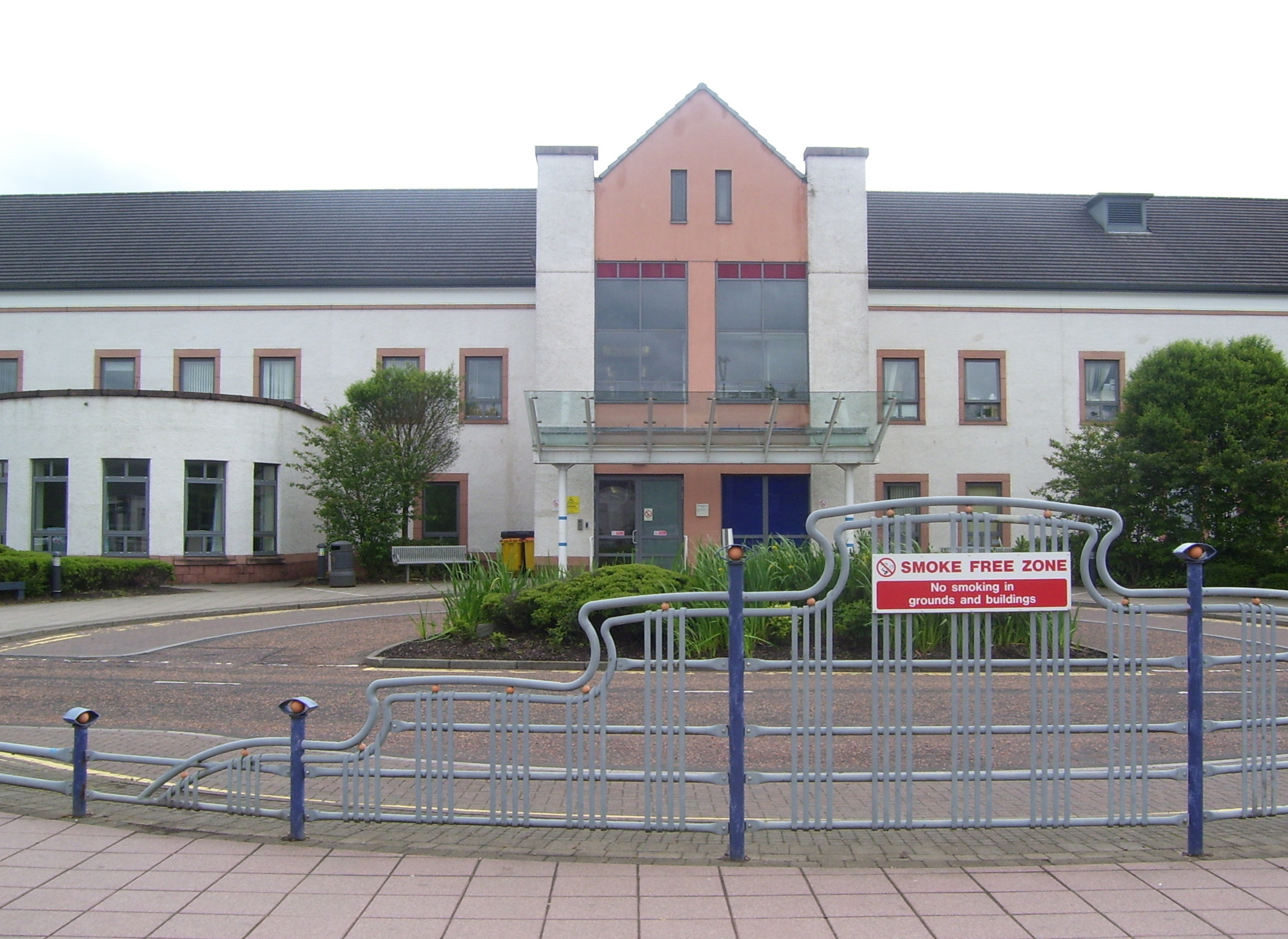
Hospital Maternity Unit

The hospital opened with 633 inpatient beds, a 56-bed day-case unit and a day hospital that could accommodate 45 service users. Lanarkshire inpatient maternity services are located at the hospital (replacing the 1960s dedicated Bellshill Maternity Hospital, which thereafter closed). It became the second-largest maternity unit in Scotland, delivering 5,500 babies each year.

The hospital has a paediatric neonatal unit, an MRI scanner, elderly care and psychiatric day hospitals, and an emergency care unit containing an integrated 24-hour accident and emergency unit with 36-bed ward. The hospital is operated by NHS Lanarkshire along with two other district general hospitals in the area, University Hospital Monklands in Airdrie and University Hospital Hairmyres in East Kilbride. All three Lanarkshire hospitals have an accident and emergency department and specialist medical and surgical services are distributed across the sites. Maternity, gynaecology, paediatric, and all NHS Lanarkshire's inpatient orthopaedic trauma services are based in Wishaw. Administered by NHS Lanarkshire, Wishaw General Hospital serves a population of approximately 250,000 within the North Lanarkshire catchment area.

== Accessibility ==
The General Hospital lies around 1.2 kilometres (3/4 mile) from both Wishaw station (to the southeast) and Shieldmuir station (to the west). Several local buses run along the adjacent Glasgow Road (A721) towards Motherwell with many of them entering the Hospital Grounds.
