= Scottish Health Council =

The Scottish Health Council was established by the Scottish Executive in April 2005 to promote Patient Focus and Public Involvement in the NHS in Scotland.

It is a committee of Healthcare Improvement Scotland. It has a national office in Glasgow and a local office in each of the 14 NHS Boards across Scotland.

The Council collects information on how NHS Boards engage with patients and the public against the Participation Standard. This focuses on:

- How well NHS Boards focus on the patient
- How well NHS Boards involve the public
- How NHS Boards take responsibility for ensuring they involve the public

In contested decisions the view of the Council on the legitimacy of the process is taken into account. The Council concentrates on process issues and does not express an opinion on the merits of proposals.

The Council has been criticised by Elaine Smith who called for “an end to one sided views of health boards being discussed behind closed doors, with MSPs undemocratically excluded in the decision process”.

It does not have any role in patients' complaints.
