= NHS Lanarkshire =

Health system in South Lanarkshire, Scotland

- Type: NHS board
- Established: 2004
- Headquarters: Kirklands, Bothwell, South Lanarkshire
- Region served: North Lanarkshire; South Lanarkshire
- Budget: 2023 - 2024: £1,424m
- Hospitals: Cleland Hospital; Coathill Hospital; Kello Hospital; Kilsyth Victoria Cottage Hospital; Kirklands Hospital; Lady Home Hospital; Stonehouse Hospital; Udston Hospital; University Hospital Hairmyres; University Hospital Monklands; University Hospital Wishaw; Wester Moffat Hospital
- Chair: Martin Hill
- Chief executive: Jann Gardener
- Staff: 11,641 (2018/19)
- Website: www.nhslanarkshire.scot.nhs.uk

NHS Lanarkshire is responsible for the health care of more than 652,000 people living within the council areas of North Lanarkshire and South Lanarkshire in Scotland, making it the third largest health board in the country after NHS Greater Glasgow & Clyde and NHS Lothian. NHS Lanarkshire employs approximately 12,000 staff. The board is based at Kirklands, Fallside Road in Bothwell, South Lanarkshire.

== Services ==
There are three district general hospitals in the area - University Hospital Hairmyres, University Hospital Monklands and University Hospital Wishaw. Each of them has an accident and emergency department and provides a range of specialist medical and surgical services. Maternity and paediatric services are based at University Hospital Wishaw.

In 2012–2013, the board had to set aside £50m of its £980m budget for the PFI hospitals at Hairmyres and Wishaw.

Primary health care is provided in the community and includes general practitioners (GPs), dentists, pharmacists, health visitors and a wide range of health professionals.

NHS Lanarkshire's primary care facilities include health centres and 15 community hospitals.

The State Hospital (also known as Carstairs Hospital or locally as the Pen), at Carstairs, while within the NHS Lanarkshire boundaries, is the responsibility of a special board of NHS Scotland.

== Service changes ==
The board's proposals to withdraw the out-of-hours GP service at Wishaw General Hospital and centralise the service at either Hamilton or Airdrie because of difficulties recruiting GPs to work out of hours have been opposed by John Pentland. The board's review was independently verified by the Scottish Health Council, which found they had complied with the national guidance service change. Its proposal to end referrals to Glasgow's NHS Centre for Integrative Care for services such as acupuncture was opposed by Elaine Smith. The Scottish Health Council took the view that the equality impact assessment did not reflect the disproportionate impact on people with long-term conditions and disabilities and how it would be mitigated. 4,800 people responding to the board's public consultation and 80.6% voted to continue.

== Performance ==
The Academy of Medical Royal Colleges and Faculties in Scotland produced a report entitled “Learning from serious failings in care” in July 2015. They found above-average mortality rates at Monklands Hospital and called on NHS Lanarkshire to make widespread improvements.

Some data was found which had apparently been submitted late and when this was analysed it was found that the mortality rates were NOT statistically different from the rest of Scotland.

In October 2021, NHS Lanarkshire was allocated 63 navy and army personnel to help ease the pressures expected during the winter.

In May 2022, NHS Lanarkshire was able to confirm that its hospitals had finally come out of the highest level of risk period, when the number of COVID-19 patients had decreased for the first time since October 2021 which had caused critical occupancy resulting in space and staff shortages, as most non-urgent planned care and some cancer procedures had already been temporarily postponed since August 2021. It emphasized however that the situation remained less than ideal and had reached a crucial point where the protection of patients and staff from catching COVID-19 remained the top priority.
