= Greenlink Cycle Path =

Cycle route in North Lanarkshire, Scotland

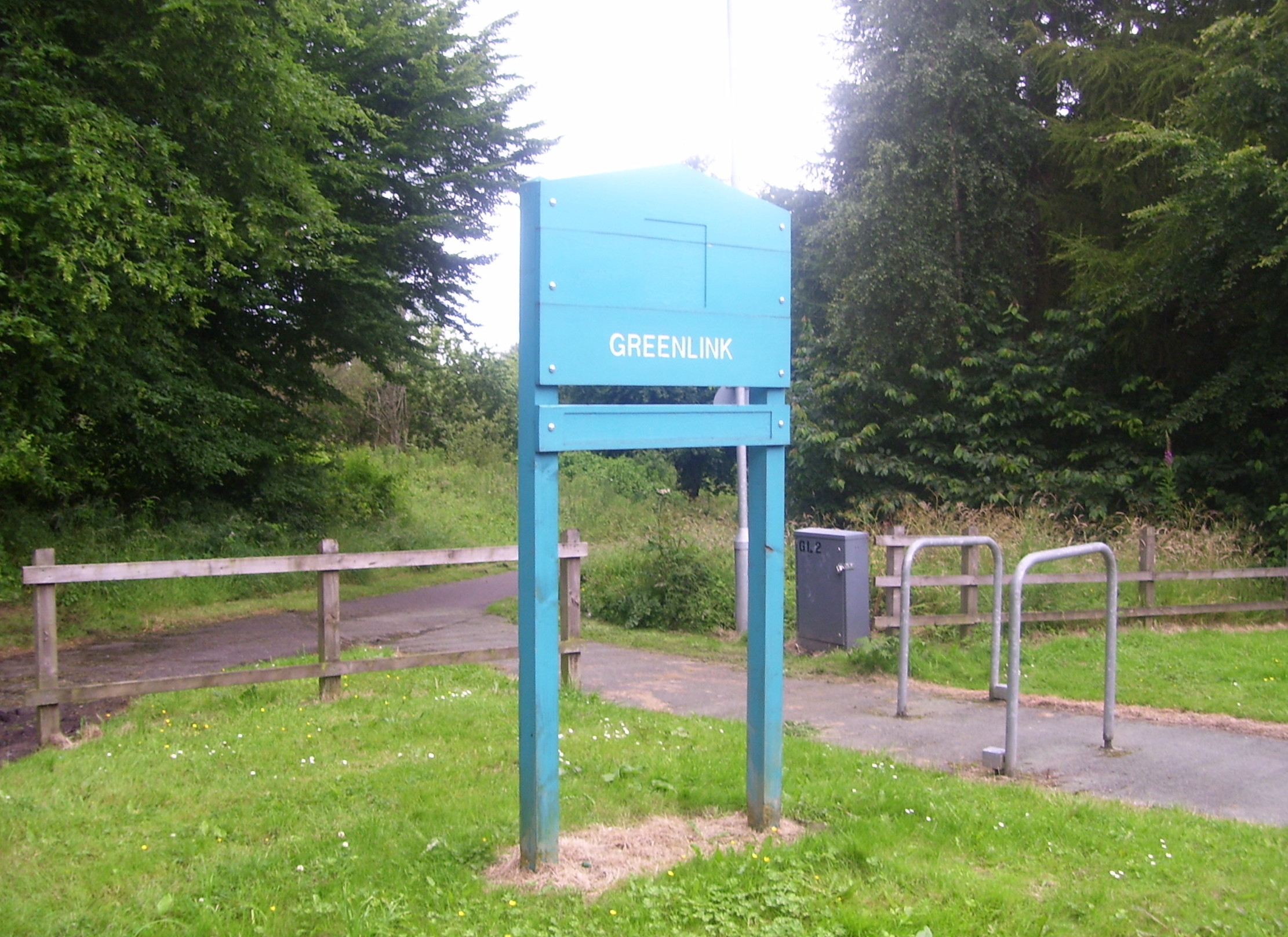
Signpost of the Cycle path

The Greenlink Cycle Path is a cycle path in North Lanarkshire that is a direct route running from Strathclyde Country Park to Motherwell Town Centre. The path is 7 kilometres (4.3 miles) in length. The Greenlink project was established in 2005, and was part of a 3-year partnership between many organisations, such as North Lanarkshire Council, Scottish Natural Heritage and Forestry Commission Scotland.

== The route ==
The path begins at the Bothwellhaugh Roman Fort (55.797666°N 4.028112°W) in Strathclyde Country Park, and travels through the woodland area of the park, going over the West Coast Main Line. The path then goes through Bellshill golf course and along the south-east of the town, then travelling over the South Calder Water and the A721. It by-passes the Forgewood suburb of Motherwell heading towards Braidhurst High School, and subsequently travels under the Argyle Line heading towards the new site of the Cathedral Primary School and Fir Park nursery joint campus. The path concludes when it runs through the residential housing area and stops at the Aquatec sports centre (55.792901°N 3.99084°W) next door to the town centre.

== Future Plans ==
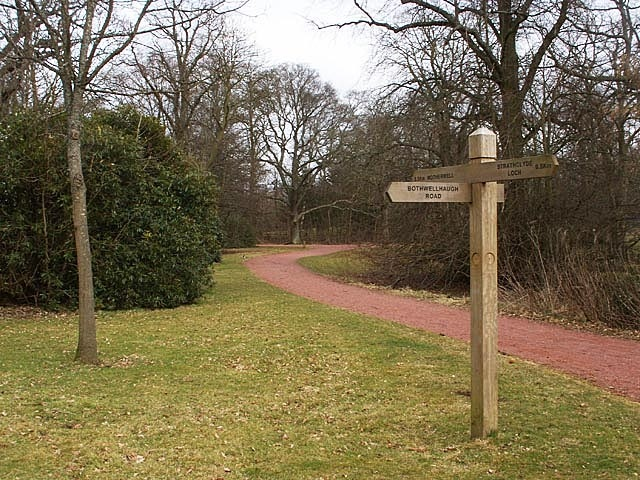
Cycle path at Strathclyde Country Park

There are plans in future to extend the cycle path beyond Motherwell town centre to connect to the new town of Ravenscraig. The initial plans prior to formation of the path was to create a direct route from Strathclyde Park to the site of the former Ravenscraig steelworks. Those plans were put on hold due to the delay in the regeneration of Ravenscraig, and so the link only stops at Motherwell town centre.

== Awards ==
In 2011, the cycle path received the Level 3 It's Your Neighbourhood award from Beautiful Scotland for developing. That same year, the cycle path also received an award for Scotland's finest Woodland, presented to them by the Minister for Environment and Climate Change, Stewart Stevenson, at the Royal Highland Show.
