= Braidhurst High School =

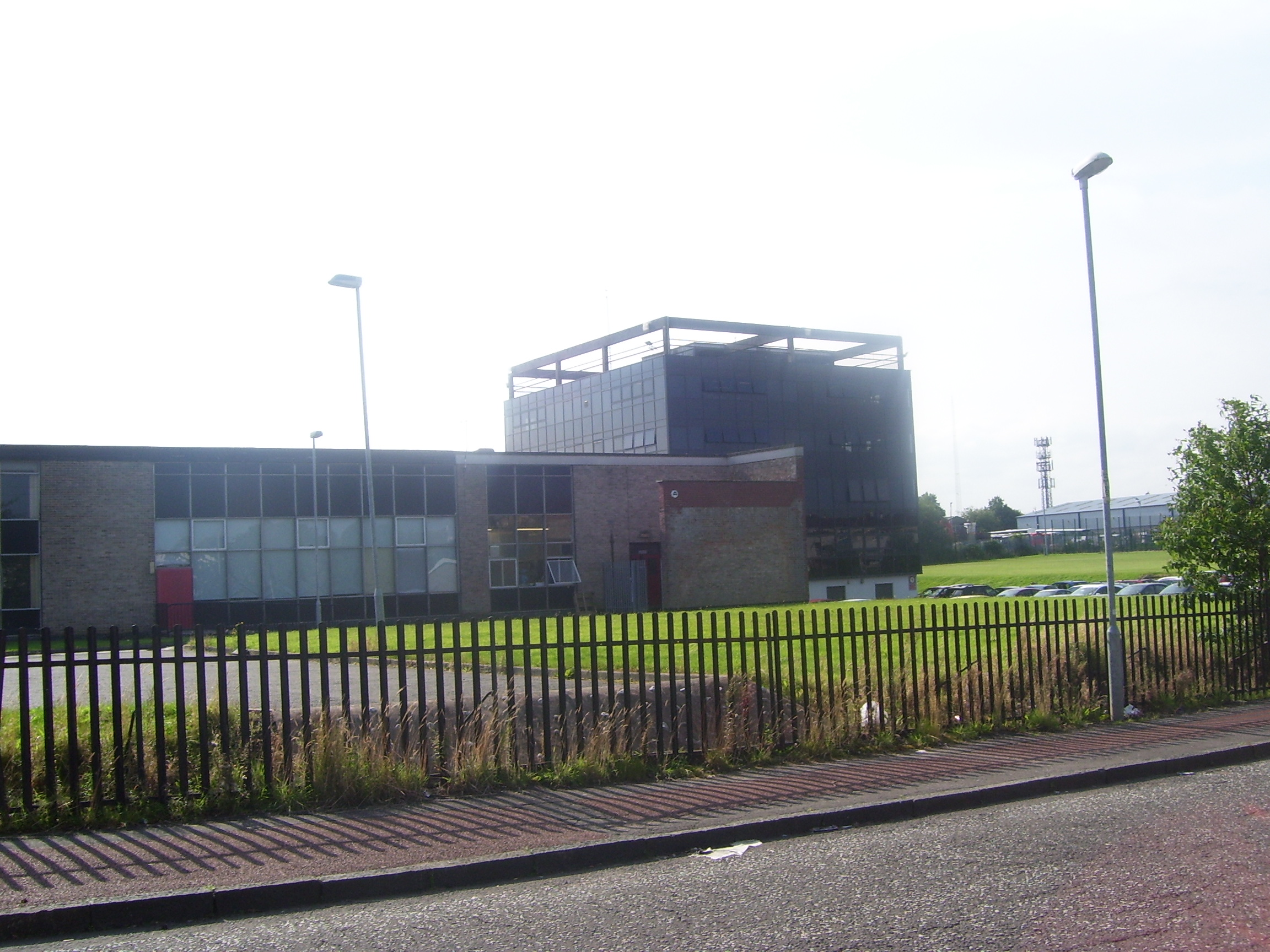

Location
- Dalriada Crescent; Forgewood, Motherwell, North Lanarkshire, ML1 3XF; Scotland; 55.801014°N 3.998494°W

Information
- Type: Comprehensive
- Motto: Endeavour
- Established: 1962
- Authority: North Lanarkshire Council
- Head teacher: Tracy McDermott
- Staff: Approx. 50
- Gender: Co-educational
- Age: 11 to 18
- Enrollment: 600+ (Oct 2018)
- Houses: 4 Atholl, Lorne, Morven, Rannoch
- Colours: Black, Red and Gold
- Nickname: "Braidy"
- Website: School website

Braidhurst High School is a non-denominational secondary school in the suburb of Motherwell known as Forgewood, North Lanarkshire, Scotland. As of June 2023, the school has a pupil roll of approx. 600 with a teaching staff equivalent of 50 FTE teachers.

== History ==
Braidhurst High School was established in 1962, making it one of the more modern secondary schools in Motherwell. By 2023, the school building had undergone modernisation works, with pink and yellow panels replaced by a glass-exterior. In 1974, Braidhurst converted to a six-year comprehensive school.

== Facilities ==
The school has a two-storey main building, which holds the library, gymnasiums, theatre/assembly hall and cafeteria, and is adjoined by a four-storey tower block, containing additional learning facilities such as a computer suite.

There is an indoor sports barn, capable of hosting indoor sporting events such as football, volleyball and basketball, as well as being a venue for sports clubs and physical education classes.

Recently, the school has undergone some upgrades, and that includes the installation of an outdoor, full-size, floodlit, astroturf pitch that is used by the school and the wider community.

The School is near the Greenlink Cycle Path, a direct route from Strathclyde Park to Motherwell Town Centre.

== Recognition ==
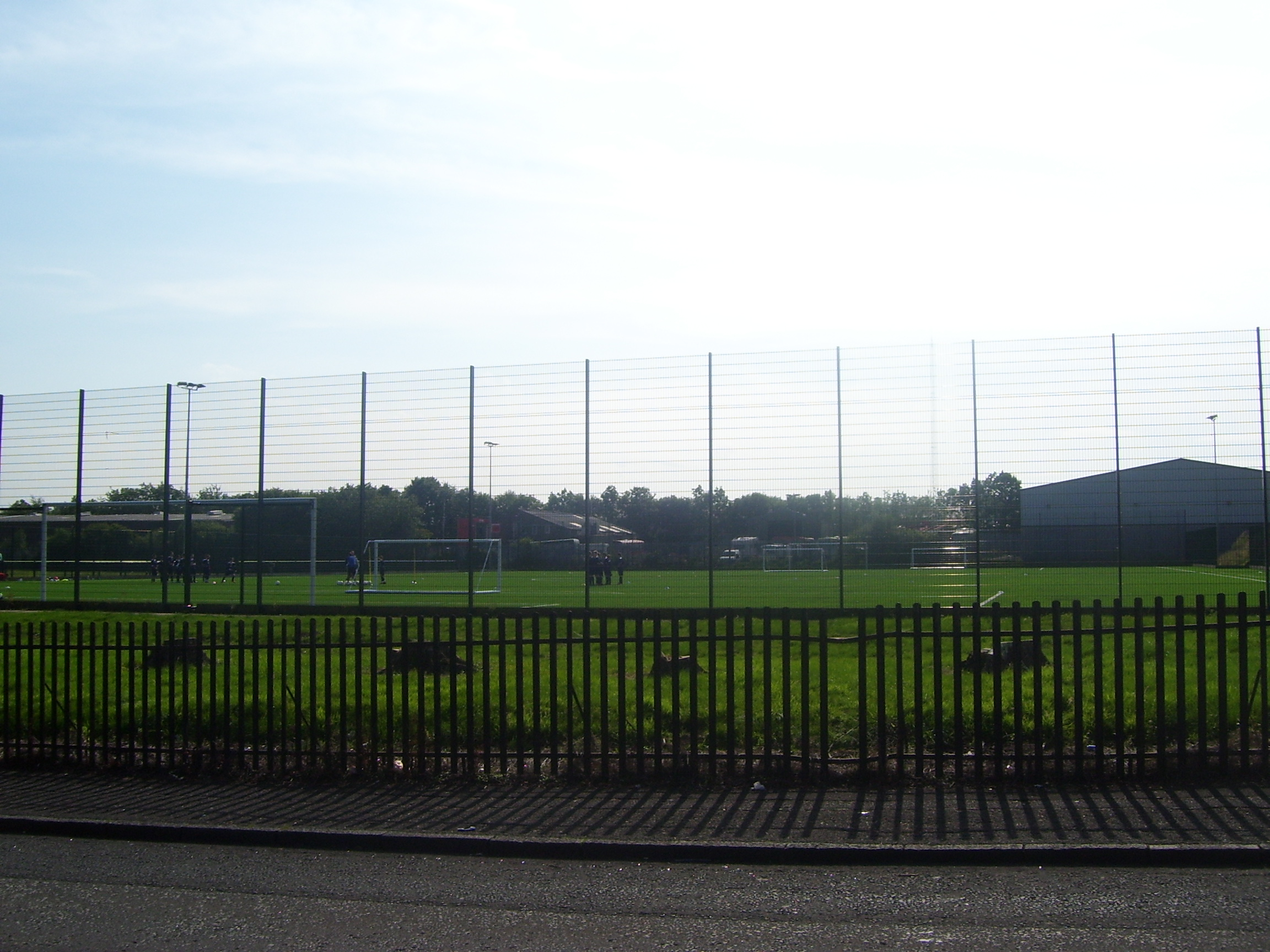
The football park at Braidhurst High School.

The outdoor playing fields meant that in 2008, Braidhurst became a designated Scottish Football Association School of football facility, one of six facilities with this status in Scotland. Young footballers all around Lanarkshire could apply for a place in Braidhurst through the initiative.

The school has been awarded the SFA Quality Mark Award for outstanding educational provision and the National Sports Comprehensive Status.

In 2012, the school was selected as the Lanarkshire base for the SFA's Performance Schools, a system supporting the development of the best young talented footballers across the country (there are seven such schools across Scotland).

The school been awarded the Customer Service Excellence award (previously the Charter Mark) on three occasions (2001, 2004, 2007).

An HMIe Report, commissioned on 19 January 2010, noted strengths within the school, including politeness of the pupils, pupils' overall good behavior, examples of good leadership throughout the school and the sense of identity through the schools status as a sports comprehensive and school of football.

The academy teams of Motherwell Football Club use the school's sports facility for training purposes.

== Catchment area ==
As well as being a secondary school for the Forgewood suburb of Motherwell, Braidhurst is also in the catchment area of other areas of Motherwell including North Motherwell, Jerviston and even Mossend. Feeder schools for Braidhurst include Muir Street Primary, Calder Primary and Logans Primary.

== Notable former pupils ==
- Tam Cowan, comedian and writer
- Allan Gentleman (born 1953), Scotland Swimming Team, World Masters Swimming Champion
- Gary McAllister, footballer for Motherwell and Scotland
- Elaine C. Smith, comedian and actress
