= Home Internationals =

Home Internationals may refer to a number of annual sporting events contested between the four home nations. Depending on the sport the nations may be England, Scotland, Wales, and Northern Ireland or England, Scotland, Wales and the whole island of Ireland.

- The British Home Championship, an association football tournament held from 1884 to 1984
- The Men's Home Internationals, a men's amateur golf tournament held since 1932
- The Home International Regatta, a rowing regatta held since 1962
