= Forgewood =

Coordinates: 55.804°N 4.002°W

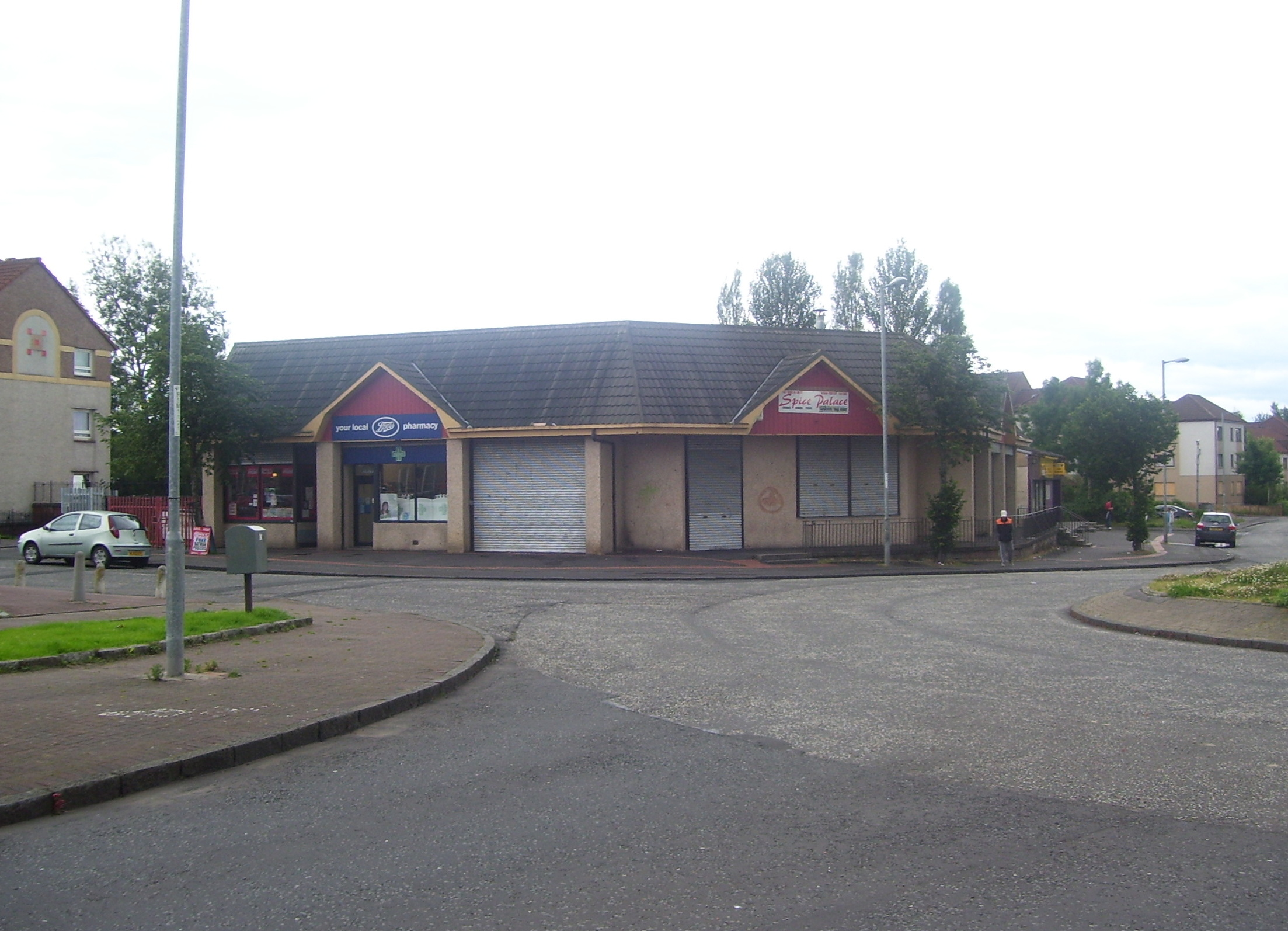
- Shops in Forgewood

- Location within North Lanarkshire
- OS grid reference: NS745583
- Council area: North Lanarkshire
- Lieutenancy area: Lanarkshire
- Country: Scotland
- Sovereign state: United Kingdom
- Post town: MOTHERWELL
- Postcode district: ML1 3
- Dialling code: 01698
- Police: Scotland
- Fire: Scottish
- Ambulance: Scottish
- UK Parliament: Motherwell and Wishaw
- Scottish Parliament: Motherwell and Wishaw Central Scotland

Forgewood is a suburb in the north-west of the town of Motherwell, North Lanarkshire, Scotland. It consists mainly of housing and low-rise flats, with the majority of them now 'modernised'. Some of the older-looking flats have since been demolished. Even though Forgewood is a small residential area of Motherwell, it does contain various local services, such as a pharmacy, a post-office and a convenience store, as well as a community centre which was rebuilt in 2016. To the south-east of Forgewood is the secondary school Braidhurst High School that serves the area. Braidhurst has a school roll of around 600 pupils; comedian Tam Cowan is a former pupil.

The West Coast Main Line by-passes near the suburb, but customer service trains stop one-mile south-east at Motherwell railway station. The A721 road, which links to Bellshill and Wishaw, passes Forgewood, with bus services to and from Glasgow stopping there.

The Greenlink Cycle Path fringes the northern edge of Forgewood and is known locally as "doon the back roads" or "the nine arches", referring to the Braidhurst Viaduct, which carries the Motherwell to Cumbernauld Line railway over the South Calder Water between Motherwell and Whifflet stations.
