= Caledonian Railway branches in North Lanarkshire =

The Caledonian Railway branches in North Lanarkshire built on the Caledonian Railway main line, which opened in 1848. In the following years the considerable increase of iron production and coal extraction in North Lanarkshire led to a progressive expansion of branch lines in the area between the eastern margin of Glasgow and Bellside in the east, and between Coatbridge, Airdrie and Motherwell. Mineral traffic was dominant and for some years passenger operation followed the construction of some of the mineral connections. In 1861 the Rutherglen and Coatbridge line was opened, extended later to Airdrie, rivalling the established Monkland Railways route. In 1869 the connection from Cleland to Midcalder was opened, connecting mineral sites but also forming a new passenger route to Edinburgh.

At the end of the nineteenth century some further passenger connections were opened, but in the twentieth century widespread decline took place as collieries and iron works reduced their output and eventually closed, followed by widespread loss of passenger traffic.

Today, the lines that are still operational form part of the North Clyde Line and Argyle Line passenger routes around Greater Glasgow and North Lanarkshire, as well as serving freight paths to and from the West Coast Main Line. From 1992, some passenger services were reinstated on remaining freight routes – most notably the Whifflet Line.

== History ==
=== The coal railways ===
In the later decades of the eighteenth century, Glasgow's demand for domestic and industrial coal had grown enormously. Although there were some limited local deposits, there were plentiful supplies of coal in the Monklands, around Airdrie, and the Monkland Canal was built in stages between 1771 and 1794 to bring the coal to the city.

In the first decades of the nineteenth century railways were proposed as a more efficient medium of transport, and a number of lines were built: the so-called "coal railways". They used a track gauge of 4 ft 6 in (1,372 mm), stone-block sleepers and horse traction at first. The Monkland and Kirkintilloch Railway opened in 1826, followed by the adjacent Ballochney Railway in 1828, the Garnkirk and Glasgow Railway in 1831, the Wishaw and Coltness Railway from 1833, and the Slamannan Railway from 1840.

Coal production in the area grew enormously as a result of the greatly reduced transport costs, and in the 1830s, iron extraction and smelting in the Monklands had been growing: the discovery of blackband ironstone by David Mushet and the invention of the hot blast process of iron smelting by James Beaumont Neilson had created a huge industry of iron production in the Coatbridge area. The coal railways found themselves at the centre of an enormous mineral producing and processing area.

Although some locomotive haulage took place, and a very limited passenger operation was conducted, the lines were technologically backward: the Ballochney and Slamannan lines had rope worked inclines. It was obvious that newer railways in other parts of the country were more efficient, and the coal railways' track gauge was now non-standard, limiting transfer of mineral traffic to the longer distance lines being built.

The Garnkirk and Glasgow Railway made some limited improvements and extensions to its line, and became the Glasgow, Garnkirk and Coatbridge Railway (GG&CR) in 1844.

=== The Caledonian Railway ===
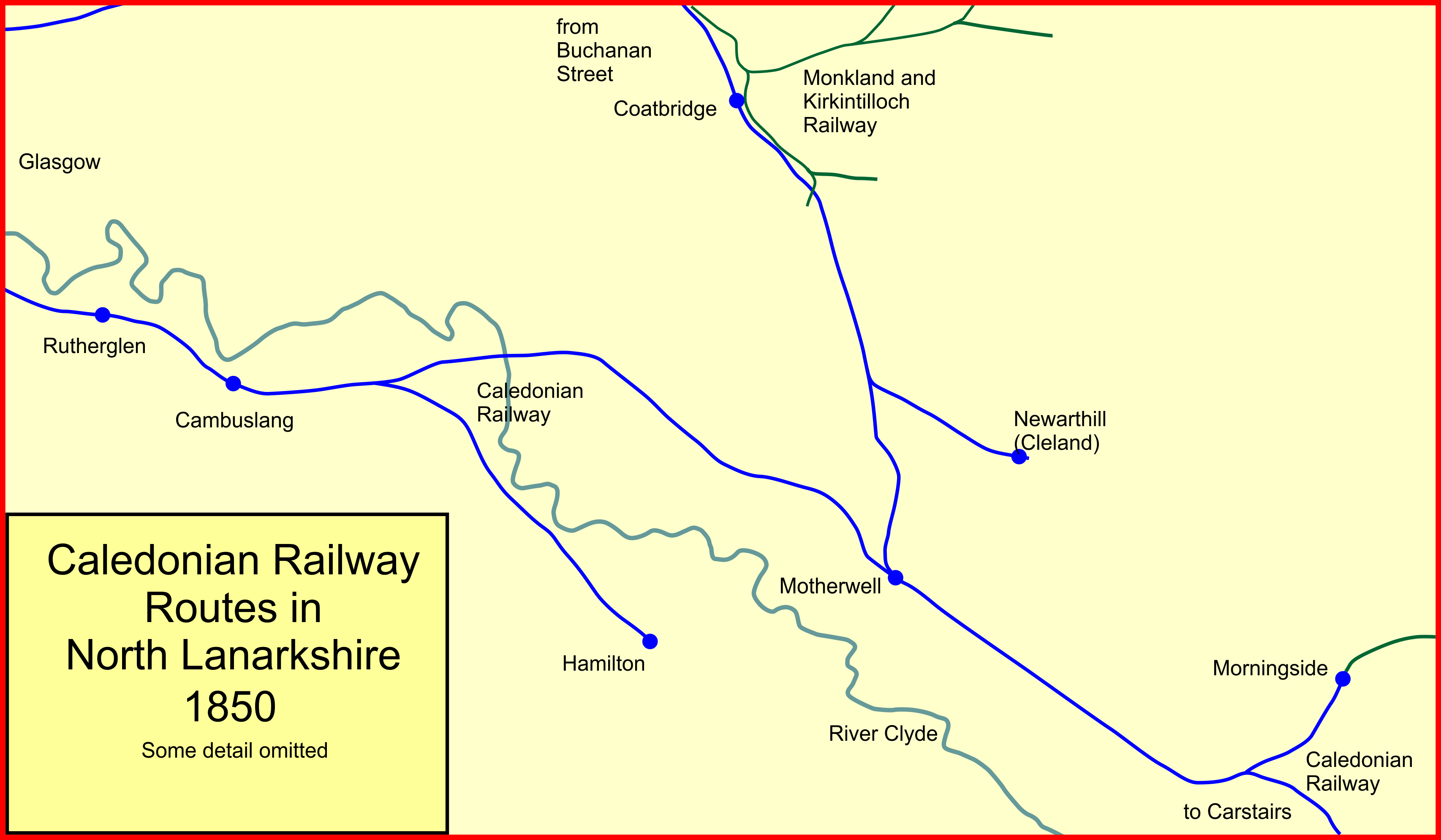
The Caledonian Railway in North Lanarkshire in 1850

The Caledonian Railway was authorised in 1845 as a trunk railway: its purpose was to connect Glasgow and Edinburgh to Carlisle, and the growing English network, carrying passengers and goods. Intermediate business from towns on the route was of course welcome; the goods traffic was predominantly agricultural and manufacturing. Other promoters were planning routes elsewhere in Scotland, especially further north, and already a Scottish network was being brought into action.

The first main line of the Caledonian was a huge undertaking by the standards of the time: the capital authorised was £1.5 million, and the promoters had negotiated with two of the coal railways, the Wishaw and Coltness and the Glasgow Garnkirk and Coatbridge, to use their lines to reach Glasgow. This would save a considerable mileage of land acquisition and of new construction. The lines' gauge would need to be converted to standard and the track strengthened, but this was already seen as desirable by those companies.

Accordingly, when the Caledonian opened its line in 1848, it reached Glasgow over those lines, from Garriongill (east of Overtown) to Motherwell, Coatbridge, Garnkirk and Glasgow. This was a very circuitous route, as the line took a broad northward sweep from Motherwell. Moreover, the Glasgow terminal was a wooden shed at Townhead, a considerable distance from the city centre, located on a toll road on the north east margin. The Caledonian set about building an extension to a new terminal station at Buchanan Street, which opened in 1849.

At the same time as the parliamentary bill for the Caledonian Railway was being considered in Parliament, the bill for another line, the Clydesdale Junction Railway was also being heard. The Caledonian promptly leased the line (before it was constructed). This gave it an alternative access to Glasgow: a much more direct route, although it ended at another inconveniently located terminal named South Side, some distance from the city. The Clydesdale Junction route connected to Motherwell and Hamilton to Glasgow by way of Cambuslang and Rutherglen. The Hamilton station was some distance from the centre of the town, and much later became "Hamilton West".

The routes from Glasgow, from South Side via Cambuslang, and from Buchanan Street via Coatbridge, converged at Motherwell station, some distance to the south-east of the present-day station; the line continued east and then south to Carstairs and Carlisle. The original Wishaw and Coltness Railway had a branch line to Cleland, where there was an iron works (and a passenger station named Newarthill), and a line to Morningside, close to further iron works.

All the coal railways had worked together in a state of competitive collaboration, but the Caledonian acquisition of the Wishaw and Coltness and the Garnkirk line resulted in a polarisation: the other lines moved away from the Caledonian sphere of influence, and together formed the Monkland Railways in 1848; that group eventually became part of the rival North British Railway.

The Monkland Railways too had converted the line to standard gauge so that interchange of traffic continued.

The Caledonian Railway had expended considerable resources in opening its main line. In addition it had acquired leases on a large number of other newly authorised lines in other parts of Scotland. In doing so it had over-reached itself financially, and for a few years its priorities lay elsewhere.

=== From 1850 ===
==== Motherwell deviation line ====
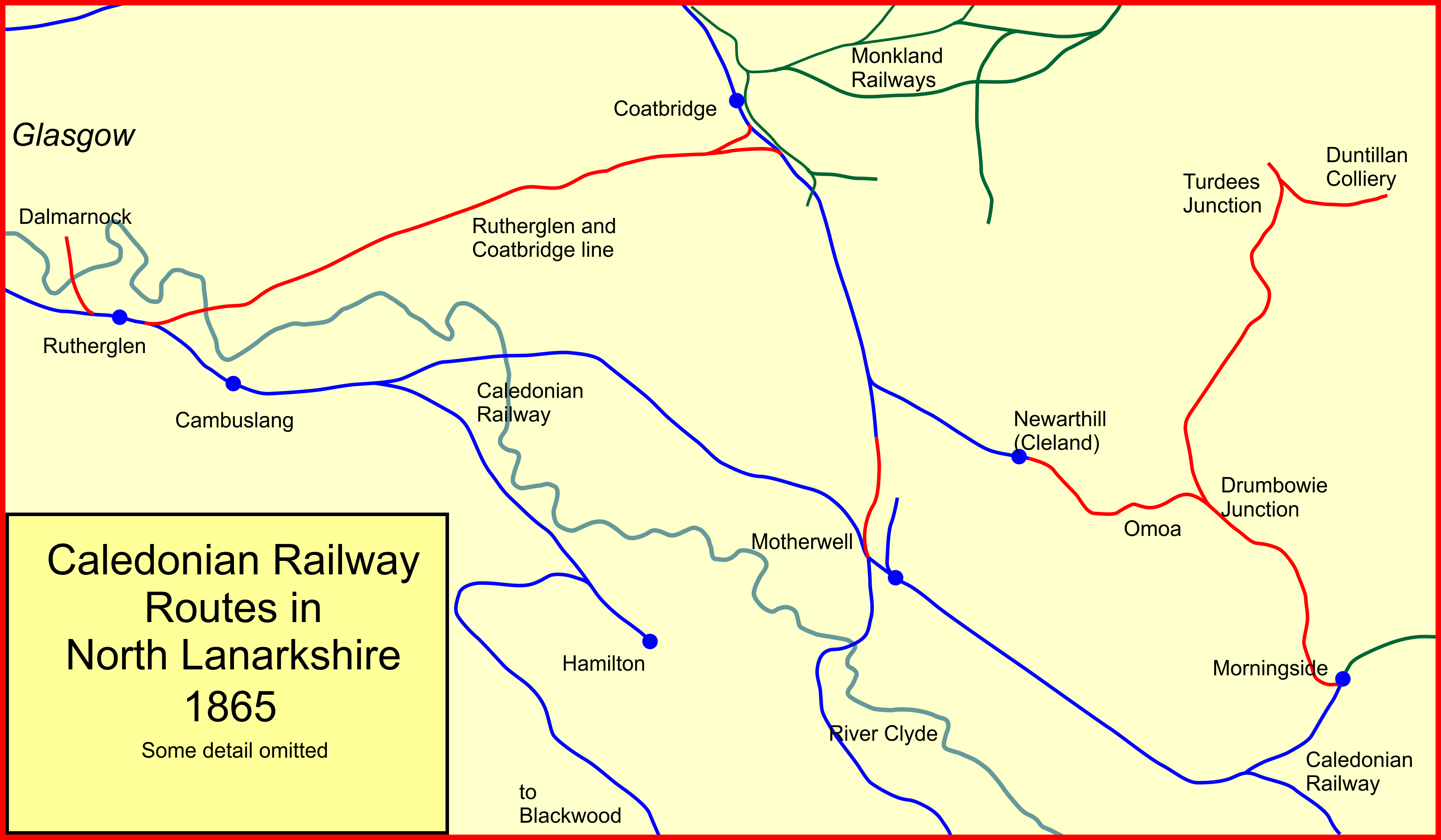
The Caledonian Railway in North Lanarkshire in 1865

There were considerable mineral resources in South Lanarkshire, and when the Caledonian Railway was unable to fund the building of a railway to serve the collieries, an independent line, the Lesmahagow Railway, was built. It ran south from Motherwell: the present-day junction at Motherwell station is named Lesmahagow Junction.

The former Wishaw and Coltness station at Motherwell was inconveniently located some distance to the south east, at the point where the W&C line turned north. The coal from the Lesmahagow area was destined for Coatbridge, and to make a through line the Caledonian built a short connection, the Motherwell Deviation Line, from Lesmahagow Junction northwards to Jerviston, joining the W&C line there; the northern part of the by-passed section of line was closed. The deviation line opened on 8 October 1857.

==== Dalmarnock and London Road ====
The area immediately east of Glasgow Green was developing rapidly as a centre of industry at this time. The former Clydesdale Junction line was not far away, but inaccessible on the south side of the Clyde. A short goods branch was built from near Rutherglen, running north and crossing the river to a Dalmarnock goods station: it opened on 24 June 1861. It became very busy and was extended to a further goods terminal at London Road, which opened on 12 April 1877. On 1 April 1879 London Road became a passenger station as well, with a service to Rutherglen station, which was resited to the junction with the main line. A passenger station named Bridgeton was provided on the line adjacent to the earlier Dalmarnock goods depot, which was now also renamed Bridgeton.

==== Cleland lines ====
In 1861 the Shareholders' Meeting was informed that a Bill was being presented for the Cleland branch extension (sometimes referred to as the Cleland, Morningside and Drumbowie Railway), to be built by the Caledonian. It was authorised by Act of Parliament of 1 August 1861, capital £160,000, and opened on 1 November 1864; the line ran from the stub Cleland branch through Omoa where there were developing pits, and then south, providing a more convenient access for the Coltness Iron Works near Morningside. From Drumbowie Junction a mineral branch ran some distance north into the hills to Turdees Junction, immediately north of Salsburgh, and a spur ran eastwards to Duntillan colliery near Kirk o'Shotts. Other pits were served on the route.

==== Rutherglen and Coatbridge line ====
The growth in the iron industry in the Monklands area, around Coatbridge, was phenomenal and unforeseen, and the north-south alignment of the Caledonian line there made transport of the refined product difficult; much of it went to Ayrshire harbours for coastal shipping transport and export. That required movement to the area of south Glasgow for onward conveyance by the Glasgow and South Western Railway (G&SWR) or to River Clyde berthing nearer the city, but also on the south side. The Caledonian developed a plan for a line to run directly east-west from the Coatbridge area, and this became the Rutherglen and Coatbridge line; it was authorised on 1 August 1861 with capital of £240,000. It opened to goods and mineral traffic on 20 September 1865, and to passengers on 8 January 1866.

The line ran from Rutherglen Junction on the Clydesdale Junction main line, crossing the River Clyde and on through Carmyle to Langloan Junction, where it divided; a northward arm ran to Coatbridge station, and a southward fork led to Whifflat Junction. (Whifflat is spelt Whifflet nowadays.) Both junctions were on the Caledonian main line south of Coatbridge; there were a great number of pits and ironworks in the general area there; Dundyvan, Langloan and Summerlee ironworks were directly served. In addition several pits developed along the line of route from Carmyle eastwards.

=== From 1865 ===
==== The Shotts line ====
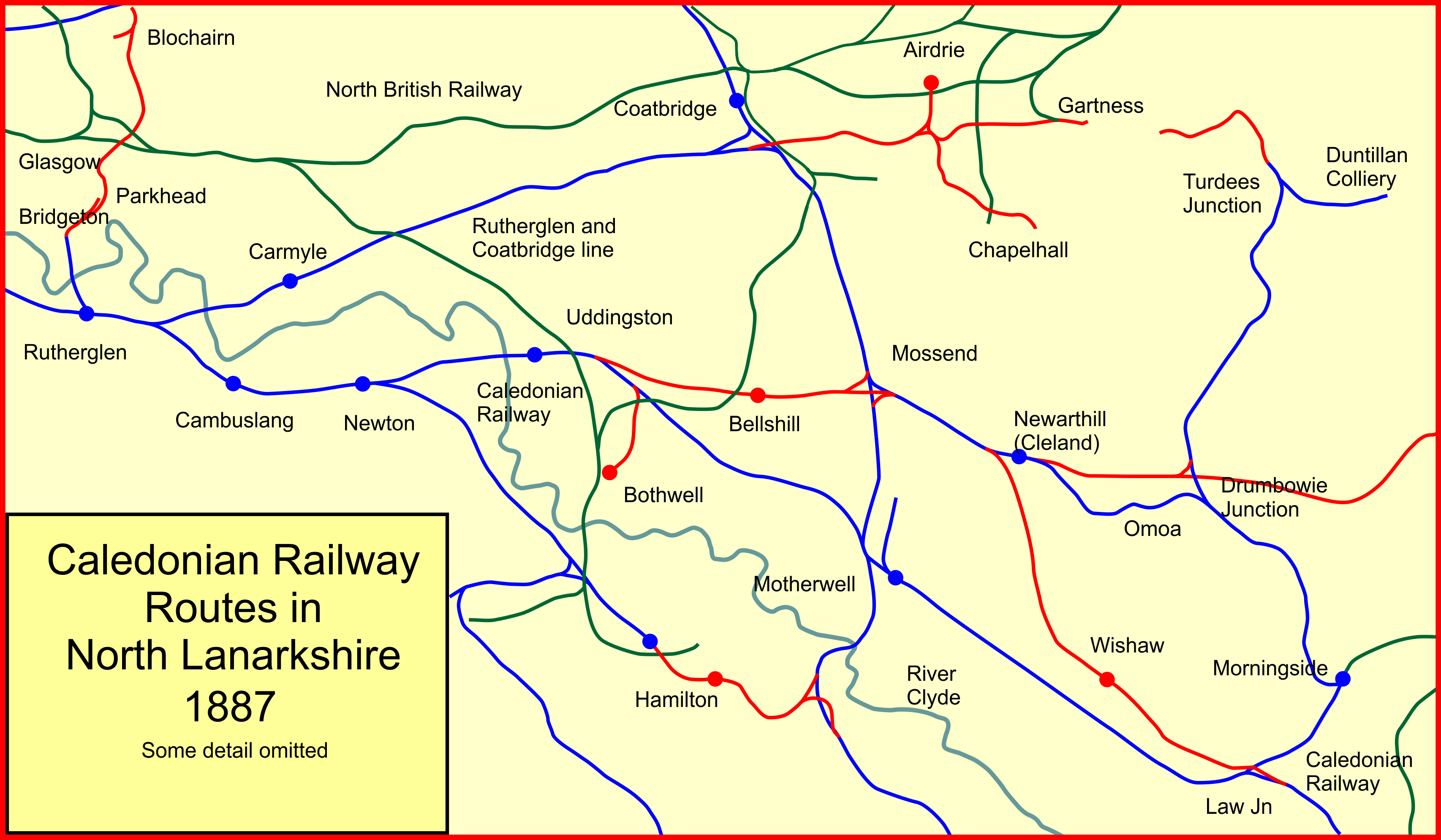
The Caledonian Railway in North Lanarkshire in 1887

In 1869 the Caledonian Railway opened a long west to east line from Cleland to Midcalder on the Carstairs - Edinburgh line. This ran via Hartwood, Shotts and Fauldhouse, connecting collieries and industries, and forming a shorter through passenger route from Glasgow to Edinburgh. It opened for goods and mineral trains on 1 January 1869, and the passenger service was started on 9 July 1869. A station was provided at Omoa (already served by the earlier Morningside and Drumbowie line, a little further south) and a spur connection there was provided at Bellside Junction to connect west to north, bringing the Turdees Junction mineral line into the network.

The mineral line at Turdees Junction was extended by 1881 to Dunsiston Colliery.

==== Bothwell, Hamilton and Motherwell ====
In 1873 the North British Railway had attempted to obtain authorisation for penetrating lines into the Hamilton area. The Caledonian Railway managed to put up successful opposition to the scheme, by undertaking to build a branch from Fallside Junction (between Uddingston and Motherwell) to Bothwell, where there was "a rather grand station". The line opened in 1877 and did not make any connections to pits. If the intention was to deflect the North British from reaching the area, it was unsuccessful: the Glasgow, Bothwell, Hamilton and Coatbridge Railway, nominally independent but friendly to the NBR, was authorised in 1874 and also opened from 1877. For many years competition on the two routes from Bothwell to Glasgow was fierce.

The Hamilton branch had been part of the Clydesdale Junction Railway proposals; the Hamilton terminus was west of the town, at the present-day Hamilton West location. As mineral lines south of Motherwell and Hamilton had built up, the gap between Hamilton and Motherwell proved inconvenient. In 1876 the gap was closed when a line was opened connecting the Hamilton terminus to a triangular junction at Ross Junction with the Lesmahagow line. It opened to goods traffic on 23 September 1876, passenger services starting on 2 October 1876. Trains from the Lesmahagow area could now run to Glasgow direct, avoiding the congestion at Motherwell. A major marshalling yard was developed at Ross Junction where much of the mineral traffic from the pits was sorted for onward conveyance. The former Hamilton terminus was renamed Hamilton West, and the connecting line had a new station at Hamilton Central. Pits at Silverton and Barncluith were connected, followed by a viaduct over the Clyde and Barncluith Tunnel under the Chatelherault estate (later Chatelherault Country Park. Turning north the line passed Haughead Junction where the new southward line to Ferniegair and Lesmahagow diverged, ending at Ross Junction.

==== The Wishaw deviation line ====
Notwithstanding the relief to congestion at Motherwell, traffic in that area was increasingly affected by the heavy industry developing in the area and at Wishaw. In 1880 a deviation line was opened, paralleling and running to the north of the main line. It ran from Law Junction, east of Garriongill Junction, and ran north-west through Wishaw to Carfin (later renamed Holytown) with a new station at Wishaw Central; the former Wishaw station on the original main line was renamed Wishaw South. The new line enabled traffic between the Carlisle area and Coatbridge and beyond to avoid Motherwell altogether.

==== The Switchback line ====
The 1861 Dalmarnock goods line was extended a short distance to serve the Parkhead forge of William Beardmore and Company in 1885. (The site, immediately south of the North British Railway line to Shettleston, is now occupied by The Forge Shopping Centre.) The Caledonian Railway continued to feel the disadvantage of having no connection between the Buchanan Street lines and the Clydesdale Junction lines near Glasgow, and in 1886 this gap was closed by a railway from Parkhead Junction, just short of the forge complex, to the Blochairn branch, which was connected to Germiston Junction, a short distance out from Buchanan Street and St Rollox.

At this time the urban housing and street network was considerably built up, and the new line had to pass over and under existing roads and railways. This involved a succession of gradients and the line, officially known as the Caledonian's "Glasgow Lines" became known as "the Switchback": fairground rides of that kind were popular at the time. Crossing over London Road and Great Eastern Road to reach Parkhead Junction, the line passed over the NBR Shettleston line, then under Cumbernauld Road to Kennyhill goods depot. It then crossed the Monklands Canal and reached Blochairn Junction; it crossed under the Buchanan Street line at Provanmill, turning west and facing towards Buchanan Street, joining the line on the north side.

==== Airdrie lines ====
Airdrie had long been served by the Monkland Railways, allied to the North British Railway, and the Caledonian had reached Coatbridge from Glasgow with the Rutherglen and Coatbridge (R&C) line. The importance of Airdrie and the mineral and manufacturing districts south and east of the town compelled the Caledonian to build a line to it. A line was built running east from Langloan on the R&C line and crossing the former Glasgow Garnkirk and Coatbridge line at Whifflet. At the low level there was a complex of running lines and sidings and a low level Whifflet station. A Whifflet High Level station was provided on the new line, which continued east to Calder, crossing the Monkland Canal by a high viaduct; the line then looped north to an Airdrie passenger and goods station on Graham Street. The line was opened on 19 April 1886 for goods traffic and on 1 June 1886 for passenger trains. The passenger trains ran through Glasgow Central Low Level to Partickhill or Maryhill.

There were important pits and ironworks to serve, and an extension was built, leaving the Airdrie branch by a triangular junction a short distance south of the station, and running from Cairnhill Junction to Calderbank, where there was an iron works. That line opened on 1 September 1887.

A branch to Gartness was opened at the same time; Gartness was an important colliery, already served by the North British Railway. The Caledonian line ran from Gartness Junction, which was the southern apex of the Airdrie triangle.

==== The Bellshill cut-off ====
The Cleland and Midcalder line of 1869 carried traffic to Glasgow via Mossend, Whifflet and the Rutherglen and Coatbridge line. This area was heavily congested by slow mineral trains, and a link line was opened on 1 October 1878 from Uddingston Junction on the main line through Bellshill to Fullwood Junction where it joined the earlier Cleland branch, now extended. This formed a more direct route from the iron workings in and beyond Cleland towards Glasgow, also shortening the Edinburgh to Glasgow route. A complex of junctions was forming at Mossend, where at the same time a west-to-north curve and a south-to-east curve were provided.

=== After 1887 ===
==== Newhouse, Mossend and Motherwell ====
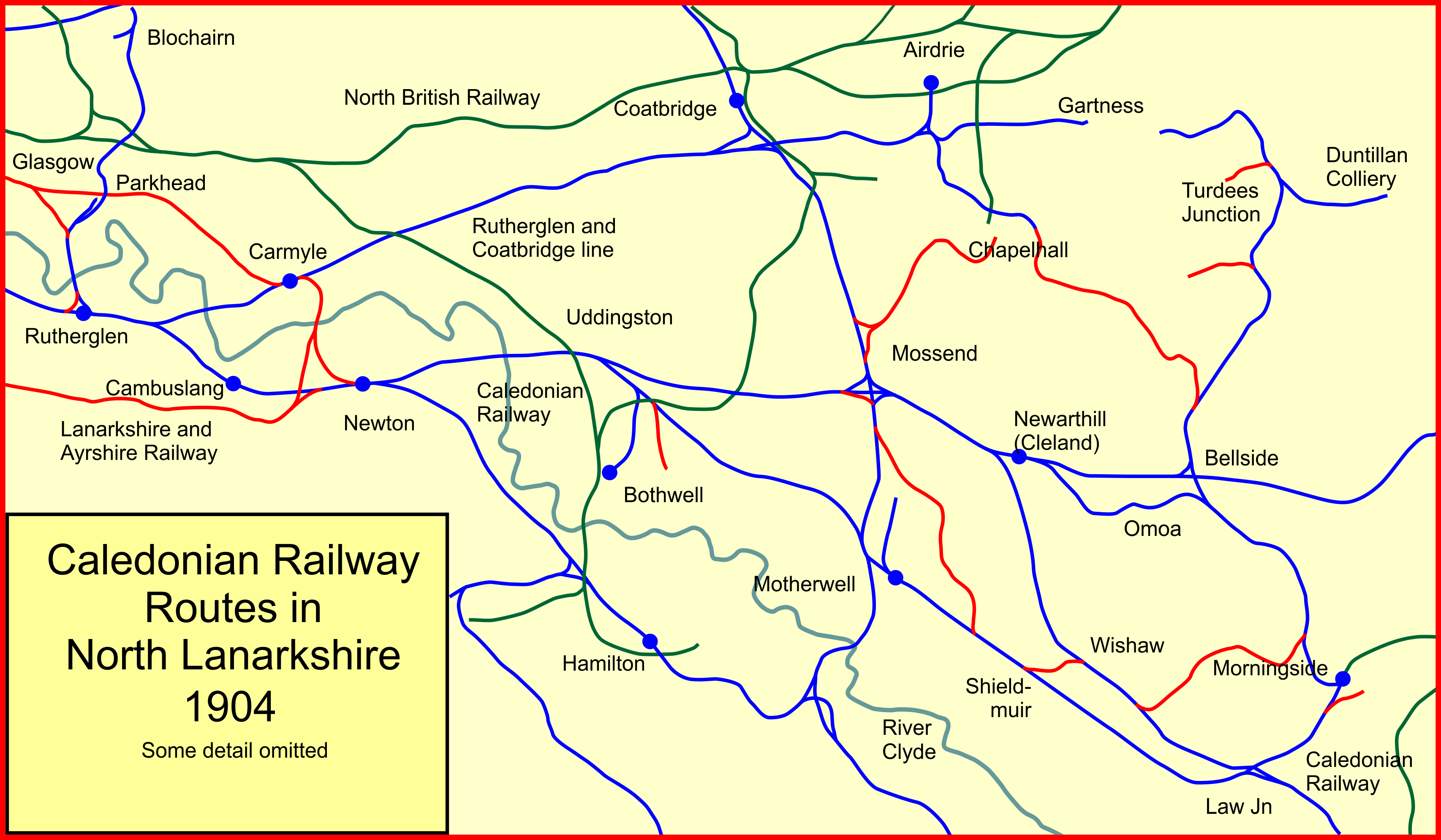
The Caledonian Railway in North Lanarkshire in 1904

The 1887 Chapelhall branch from Airdrie was extended to Newhouse, opening on 2 July 1888. Newhouse was reached from the south as well, by a mineral line, also opened in 1888 from near Landridge Junction on the Turdees branch; other mineral branches off the Turdees line opened in 1896 - 1898, to pits at Legbrannock, Springbank, Linrigg and Blackridge, in remote areas south east of Airdrie.

Also by 1898 a branch was made from near Fullwood, between Uddingston and Motherwell, to the Hamilton Palace Colliery at Bothwellhaugh. Nearly all of the extent was joint with the North British Railway, which had opened its Bothwell line, passing very close to the Caledonian Railway at Fullwood where it made a connection.

By 1898 the Thankerton branch (geographically unrelated to the station of that name) was opened from a triangular junction on the line between Motherwell and Coatbridge to the Calderbank iron works near Chapelhall; the new line gave a much more convenient access from the important iron works from the Thankerton collieries near Mossend junctions and Holytown, and the Mossend iron works. A marshalling complex was being developed at Mossend, immediately north of the junctions.

The west to south spur was opened at Mossend in 1903, completing the full clover leaf there. This is the route nowadays taken by the circular passenger service from Uddingston to Motherwell via Bellshill.

There was much heavy industry in Wishaw lying between the original main line and the deviation line, and siding groups connected from both lines to works sites located between them, as well as to pits lying to the north of the line. In 1901 a running line connection was made a little to the north west of the siding connections, running from Wishaw Central (actually Wishaw North Junction) to Shieldmuir, enabling traffic from Motherwell to run direct to Chapelhall.

On 1 October 1902 a new line was opened from Wishaw South Junction, also on the deviation line, through Cambusnethan, to Newmains Junction on the Cleland to Morningside line, very close to the ever-expanding Coltness Iron Works but not directly connected to it. The junction faced towards Newmains station, some distance further north. A passenger service was attempted from Wishaw to Newmains, but when the Lanarkshire Tramways started operating in the area on 29 June 1909, the passenger traffic was doomed. The section from Cambusnethan to Newmains ceased in October 1909, and the remainder in 1917.

About 1900 a short mineral branch was opened off the Garriongill to Morningside line to serve the expanding Chapel Colliery, which was also served from the east by the North British Railway Carluke branch.

==== Glasgow south side suburban ====
In 1892 a west to north curve was built at Rutherglen, enabling access from the Gushetfaulds direction towards London Road and the Switchback line.

Suburban passenger traffic had not been well served in some areas of the city, but on 10 August 1888 the Glasgow Central Railway company obtained its authorising Act of Parliament. The line was to run west to east along the north shore of the Clyde through the centre of Glasgow. The Caledonian was alive to the importance of this line and took it over on 31 May 1890. Glasgow was well built up with housing and industry by this time, and the project was daunting: five out of seven miles (8 out of 11 km) of route were to be underground, mostly built by cut and cover. A western section was opened in 1894, and the line between Glasgow Cross and Bridgeton (on the London Road branch from Rutherglen) was opened on 1 November 1895. Bridgeton station was renamed Dalmarnock (the name of the earlier goods depot there) and was now a junction for the switchback line and London Road; the station there was closed to passengers. A new "Bridgeton" station was provided further west on the Central line.

The Glasgow Central Railway was completed as a through route on 10 August 1896, including a station at Glasgow Central Low Level. 260 trains a day operated through the line; the tunnels became notorious for the smoky atmosphere and grimy conditions.

Already the Caledonian had started construction of an eastern branch of the line; leaving the Central Railway main line at Bridgeton it ran east under London Road to Parkhead, emerging just before Springfield Road. Running south east the line had a station at Tollcross, crossing under London Road once again and curving in to join the Rutherglen and Coatbridge line at Carmyle. Continuing, the line diverged southwards, crossing the Clyde and running to Newton station, facing Motherwell and Hamilton. The line opened on 1 February 1897.

==== Motherwell lines ====
The area at Motherwell north of the main line became increasingly industrialised, especially in the heavy metal working industries, and a considerable number of short branch connections were made to the sites; in some cases these were internal industrial lines, and in some cases they were short mineral branch lines of the Caledonian Railway. The area north east of Motherwell station was occupied by the Dalzell Iron and Steel Works of David Colville & Sons as well as a number of allied concerns. A mineral branch had existed since 1890 from Flemington to Coursington Road Junction, north of Dalzell; the junction connected to internal lines to the works and Coursington Colliery. In 1901 the line was extended northwards crossing the South Calder Water and joining the closed alignment of the original Wishaw and Coltness line to converge at Jerviston Junction, south of Mossend, with the later main line northwards. This shortened and simplified the route between the Coatbridge ironworks and Dalzell.

==== The Lanarkshire and Ayrshire Railway ====
The Lanarkshire and Ayrshire Railway (L&AR) was promoted independently to give the Caledonian access to Ardrossan eliminating dependency on the rival Glasgow and South Western Railway, and avoiding the congested tracks around Gushetfaulds in south Glasgow. The primary traffic was mineral trains from Lanarkshire to export. Building progressively from the Ardrossan end, the L&AR reached Newton on 6 January 1904. A northwards spur was provided, from Kirkhill Junction crossing the main line to join the Glasgow Central Railway Tollcross line at Westburn Junction. There were two impressive viaducts, crossing the main line and the River Clyde. The passenger service on the line never really developed, however, and it closed to passengers on 17 June 1975.

=== After 1904 ===
By 1904 nearly all of the railway network had been created. The extractive industries and the metal working industries were at their zenith. The railways had been energetic in responding to their requirements, in building new connections and branch lines to serve new industrial sites. From the end of World War I these industries started to decline, as overseas industrialisation caught up, especially as cheaper sources of coal and iron ore became available. Many of the branches had been built to serve an industrial site and if that closed, the local population moved away and little business was available for the railway. However the concentration of iron and steel industries around Motherwell was sustained and state control followed from 1951.

The fate of the railways after that year falls into three groups: through main lines; viable suburban passenger routes; and goods and mineral branch lines dependent on mineral extractive industries.

==== Through main lines ====
The successor to the Caledonian Railway main line runs from Glasgow through Newton, Motherwell and Law Junction, carrying a heavy intercity passenger service. The line through Coatbridge to Motherwell continues as a trunk line for freight services. Apart from Motherwell, the residual passenger stations on these routes are dependent on suburban traffic. Mossend Yard was developed in the 1960s and has become a major marshalling point and maintenance depot for freight trains.

==== Suburban passenger routes ====
The Glasgow Central Railway closed in 1964, but the majority of it reopened as the Argyle Line in 1979; it carries an intensive electrified suburban passenger service, joining the main line at Rutherglen, continuing along the main line. Trains run to Lanark, using the Shieldmuir spur to Wishaw, rejoining the original main line at Law Junction. Other trains run on a circle from Newton via Uddingston, Bellshill, Motherwell and Hamilton. The Tollcross line also closed in 1964 but was not reopened. The short London Road branch closed in 1966.

The Lanarkshire and Ayrshire line closed west of Neilston, but the portion within the scope of this article was electrified and remains open, with trains running from Glasgow Central via the Cathcart circle.

The line from Mossend Junction and Holytown (as it became) to Midcalder continues in use with a diesel operated passenger service between Glasgow and Edinburgh.

The Rutherglen and Coatbridge line closed to passenger traffic in 1964. The Airdrie extension closed to passengers in 1943, but it continued in use for freight purposes until 1964. The central part of the R&C line was reopened to local passenger traffic between Rutherglen and Whifflet in 1993. The link line from Newton to Carmyle closed in 1983.

The Bothwell branch closed on 5 June 1950.

==== Goods and mineral branches ====
The decline in the extractive industries took a heavy toll on the mineral branch lines of the Caledonian Railway. Some of the collieries on the Turdees line closed in 1910, and the entire northern section of the line closed in 1958. The Chapelhall section from Bellside closed in 1966, preceded by the section south of Bellside to Morningside, which had closed in 1947. The Cambusnethan line had closed much earlier in 1923. The earlier Omoa line closed in 1935–1937.

The Hamilton Palace branch closed in 1959.

The Chapelhall branch from Mossend (the Thankerton line) closed in the 1940s, and the north to west curve at Mossend closed in 1985.

The Lesmahagow lines had completely closed by 1968 and the southwards mineral lines from Hamilton closed in 1960.

== Topography ==
Passenger stations on routes within the scope of this article were as follows.

=== Wishaw and Coltness, Whifflet to Motherwell ===
- Whifflat; later spelt Whifflet; opened November 1845; replaced by Whifflet Lower 1 June 1886; closed 5 November 1962; reopened as Whifflet 21 December 1992;
- Whifflet Junction; divergence of Rosehall line;
- Carnbroe Ironworks; short lived workmen's station, probably 1843 to 1844;
- Thankerton branch junctions;
- Holytown; opened 6 March 1835; renamed Mossend 1882; closed 5 November 1962;
- Mossend North Junction; diverging lines to Cleland, and (later) to Bellshill;
- Milnwood Junction; converging lines as above;
- Motherwell; Wishaw and Coltness Railway station; later replaced by present station further west.

=== Rutherglen and Coatbridge line, and Airdrie Extension ===
- Rutherglen East Junction;
- Carmyle; converging junction from Bridgeton line; station opened 8 January 1866; closed 5 October 1964; reopened 4 October 1993;
- Carmyle East Junction; diverging to Newton;
- Mount Vernon; opened 8 January 1866; closed 16 August 1943; reopened 4 October 1993;
- Baillieston; opened 8 January 1866; closed 5 October 1964; reopened at a location to the west 4 October 1993;
- Drumpark; opened 1 May 1934; closed 5 October 1964; reopened as Bargeddie 4 October 1993;
- Kirkwood; opened 4 October 1993;
- Langloan; opened 8 January 1866; closed 5 October 1964;
- Langloan Junctions; diverging towards Coatbridge and Mossend;
- Whifflet High Level; opened 1 June 1886; closed 1 January 1917; reopened 1 March 1919; renamed Whifflet 1953; closed 5 October 1964; reopened 21 December 1992, see above;
- Calder; opened 1 June 1886; closed 1 January 1917; reopened 1 March 1919; closed 3 May 1943;
- Cairnhill Junction; diverging to Gartness Junction;
- Airdrie; opened 1 June 1886; from 1 January 1917 the passenger service from Whifflet was suspended and Airdrie only served the Newhouse; full operation resumed 1 March 1919; closed 3 May 1943; at times described as Airdrie South.

=== Airdrie to Newmains ===
- Airdrie; see above;
- Gartness Junction; converging from Cairnhill Junction, see above, and diverging to Gartness;
- Calderbank; opened 1 September 1887; closed 1 December 1930;
- Chapelhall; opened 1 September 1887; closed 1 December 1930;
- Newhouse; opened 2 July 1888; closed 1 December 1930; there was an unadvertised service from 1937 to 31 July 1941.

=== Uddingston to Bellside (line to Midcalder) ===
- Uddingston Junction; diverging from main line;
- Bellshill; opened 1 May 1879;
- Mossend West Junction; diverging lines to Mossend North Junction and Milnwood Junctions, see above;
- Fullwood Junction; converging junctions, see above;
- Carfin; opened 1 June 1880; renamed Carfin Junction 1882, then Holytown Junction later in 1882; renamed Holytown from 1901;
- Bellside; opened 9 July 1869; renamed Omoa 1879; renamed Cleland 1964.

=== Wishaw deviation line ===
- Holytown junction;
- Wishaw Central; opened 1 June 1880; renamed Wishaw 1965;
- Wishaw South Junction; diverging to Cambusnethan line;
- Overtown; opened January 1881; (known initially as Overtown Waterloo); closed 1 January 1917; reopened 1 January 1919; closed 5 October 1942;
- Law Junction; converging on main line.

=== First Omoa line ===
- Newarthill; opened 15 May 1867; closed 1 June 1880;
- Cleland; opened 15 May 1867; closed 1 January 1917; reopened 2 June 1919; closed 1 December 1930;
- Newmains; opened 15 May 1867; closed 1 January 1917; reopened 2 June 1919; closed 1 December 1930;
- Davies Dyke; closed April 1848;
- Morningside; originally Wishaw and Coltness Railway terminal.

=== Cambusnethan line ===
- Wishaw South Junction; see above;
- Cambusnethan; opened 1 October 1901; closed 1 January 1917;
- Newmains; see above.

=== Bothwell branch ===
- Fallside Junction; on main line;
- Bothwell; opened 1 March 1877; reduced to "workmen's" service 1917 to 1919; closed 5 June 1950.
