= Bothwellhaugh =

Former settlement in Scotland

Coordinates: 55.799203°N 4.043928°W

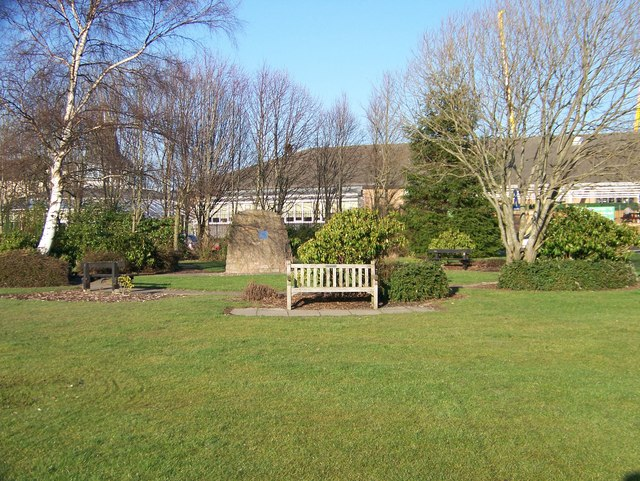
The Memorial Garden at Strathclyde Park

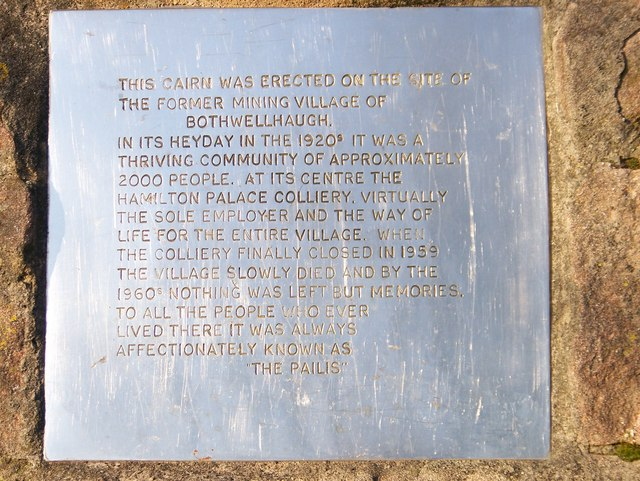
Plaque to the village in the Memorial Garden

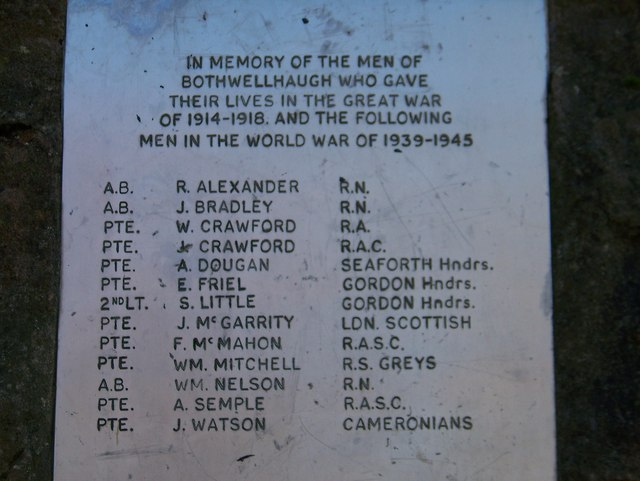
Plaque to Bothwellhaugh men who died in the wars.

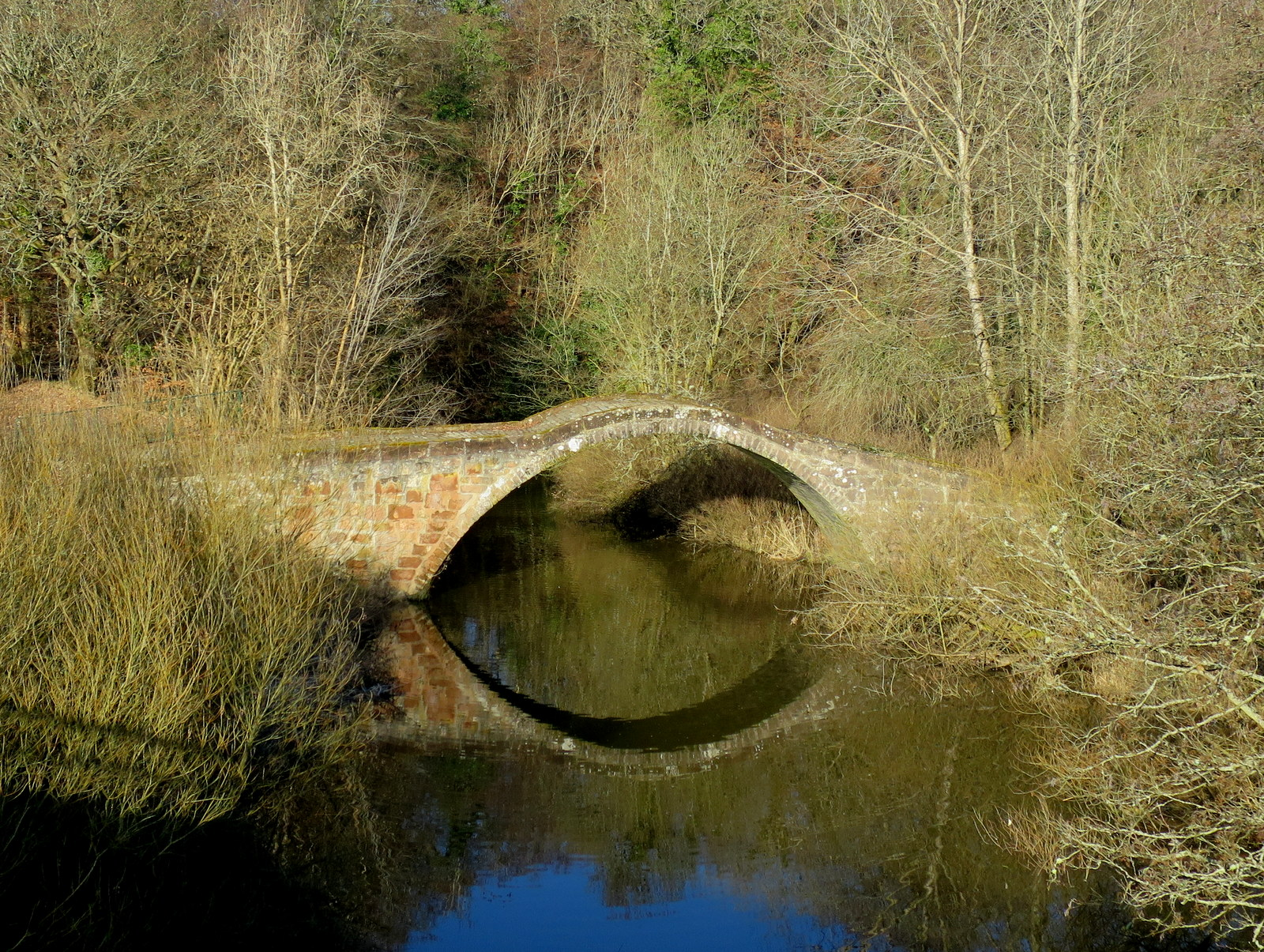
The "Roman Bridge"

Bothwellhaugh was a Scottish coal mining village, which housed Hamilton Palace Colliery workers and their families. Locals referred to the village as The Pailis, and it was located near the towns of Motherwell, Bellshill and Hamilton, in Lanarkshire. The village was occupied from the mid-1880s, until it was demolished in 1965.

== Pre-mining History ==
The remains of the Bothwellhaugh Roman Fort and a Roman bath house were found in the park; it is around a day's march from the Antonine Wall. James Hamilton of Bothwellhaugh, became notorious for being the assassin of James Stewart, 1st Earl of Moray, Regent of Scotland, at Linlithgow in 1570.

== Mining village ==
There were two coal mines on the site operated by the Bent Colliery Company. Housing was developed from the late 1880s until 1905. Before WW1 over 2000 tonnes of coal a day were being produced by over 1000 miners. The mining from this pit led to the demolition of Hamilton Palace due to subsidence.

== Decline and flooding ==
The pit shut in May 1959 as flooding in the pits which went under the River Clyde meant that pumping became a major cost. The houses had fallen into poor state of repair and sewage was becoming a problem.

The site of the village has now been flooded to produce Strathclyde Loch, within Strathclyde Country Park. about ten miles south-east of Glasgow.

The Bothwellhaugh name is retained in a set of football/rugby pitches operated by North Lanarkshire Council, near to the M&D's amusement park and the Raith Interchange of the M74 motorway / A725. Bothwellhaugh was used as the name of a nearby development by Miller Homes in Bothwell, with one of the streets being named Pailis Crescent in honour of the old village.

== Memorial ==
There is a cairn at Strathclyde Park to remember the village. Former residents of the village hold an annual reunion, meeting at the cairn. A memorial to the village and visitor centre has been proposed at the old Raith farm workers cottage.

== Bibliography ==
Bothwellhaugh: A Lanarkshire mining community, 1884-1965 Robert Duncan, ISBN 1870140001 ISBN 9781870140003 Workers Educational Association, 1986
