= Strathclyde Country Park =

Country park in Lanarkshire

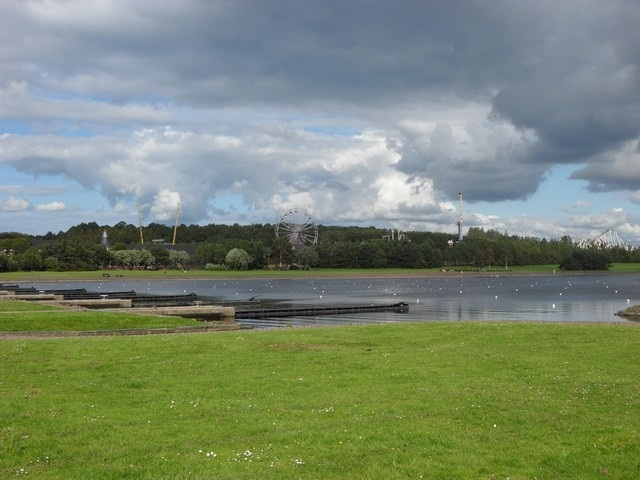
- Interactive map of Strathclyde Country Park
- Type: Country park
- Location: Motherwell, United Kingdom
- Coordinates: 55°47′51″N 4°01′23″W
- Area: 4km

Strathclyde Country Park is a country park located on the outskirts of Motherwell in North Lanarkshire, Scotland, named after the former Strathclyde region of Scotland. It is often commonly referred to as Strathclyde Park, or simply The Strathy.

== Description ==
The park covers some 4 km^{2} (1 1/2 sq mi), centred on the artificial Strathclyde Loch. It is located next to the River Clyde between Hamilton and Motherwell. Strathclyde Park forms what used to be known as the Low Parks of the now demolished Hamilton Palace and still includes buildings associated with the palace. When the loch was created in the early 1970s it involved the flooding of the old mining village of Bothwellhaugh. The park offers many amenities and attractions such as coarse angling, woodland walks, watersports, and a camping and caravanning site. One of Scotland's theme parks, M&D's, is located in the park. Until 1996, the music festival T in the Park was held here.

The west side of the park is bounded by the River Clyde, which was diverted when the loch was built in 1975. The original course can be seen between the east loch shore and the island. The east side of the park is quieter, with woodland and paths leading up the slopes to Motherwell.

The remains of Bothwellhaugh Roman Fort and a Roman bathhouse can be seen in the park, where the South Calder Water flows into the loch. There is an arched bridge often mistakenly described as Roman, although no evidence of Roman work was found in it, across the South Calder nearby. The site of the Battle of Bothwell Bridge (1679) is to the north west of the park.

Although the focus of the park is on recreation, a variety of habitats are present, including wetlands and native woodland.

The Greenlink Cycle Path start-off point is located in the park and travels to Motherwell Town Centre. Also, a section of the Clyde walkway, from Glasgow to New Lanark, runs through the park.

== Rowing ==
Major events held at the loch include the rowing events for the 1986 Commonwealth Games, the 1996 World Rowing Junior Championships (and the World Rowing Championships for non-Olympic events), the 2005 World Rowing Masters Regatta, the 2007 World Rowing U23 Championships the 2006 and 2014 Commonwealth Rowing Championships. and the 2018 European Rowing Championships.

The loch also hosts the British Rowing Championships once every four years, which are normally held in Holme Pierrepont, Nottingham, and also every four years hosts the Home International Regatta.

The park is home to Strathclyde Park Rowing Club, Edinburgh University Boat Club, Heriot-Watt University Boat Club and to the Scottish Rowing Centre, and acts as a secondary training centre for St Andrew Boat Club.

== Sailing ==
The park is home to Strathclyde Loch Sailing Club which is a Royal Yachting Association accredited sailing and powerboat training centre.

== Major events ==
The watersports events of the 2005 Glasgow Special Olympics and the 2006 Scottish Triathlon Championships were staged at the park.

Since 2005, the park has been the venue for the annual Stereofunk music festival. The park was also the venue for the T in the Park festival between 1994 and 1996.

In 2009 the park was used to host the first ever Great Scottish Swim, a mass participation open water swim event. The event was due to be held there again in 2010 but was cancelled due to poisonous blue-green algae in the loch.

The park was an official venue for the 2011 International Children's Games.

In 2014, Strathclyde Park hosted the triathlon event of the 2014 Commonwealth Games. The 2018 European Triathlon Championships were held at the Strathclyde Park as part of the multi-sport 2018 European Championships.

The park hosts a Parkrun event at 09:30 every Saturday morning. It has also hosted an 'Inflatable 5k' event, popular with families and participants collecting charity donations.

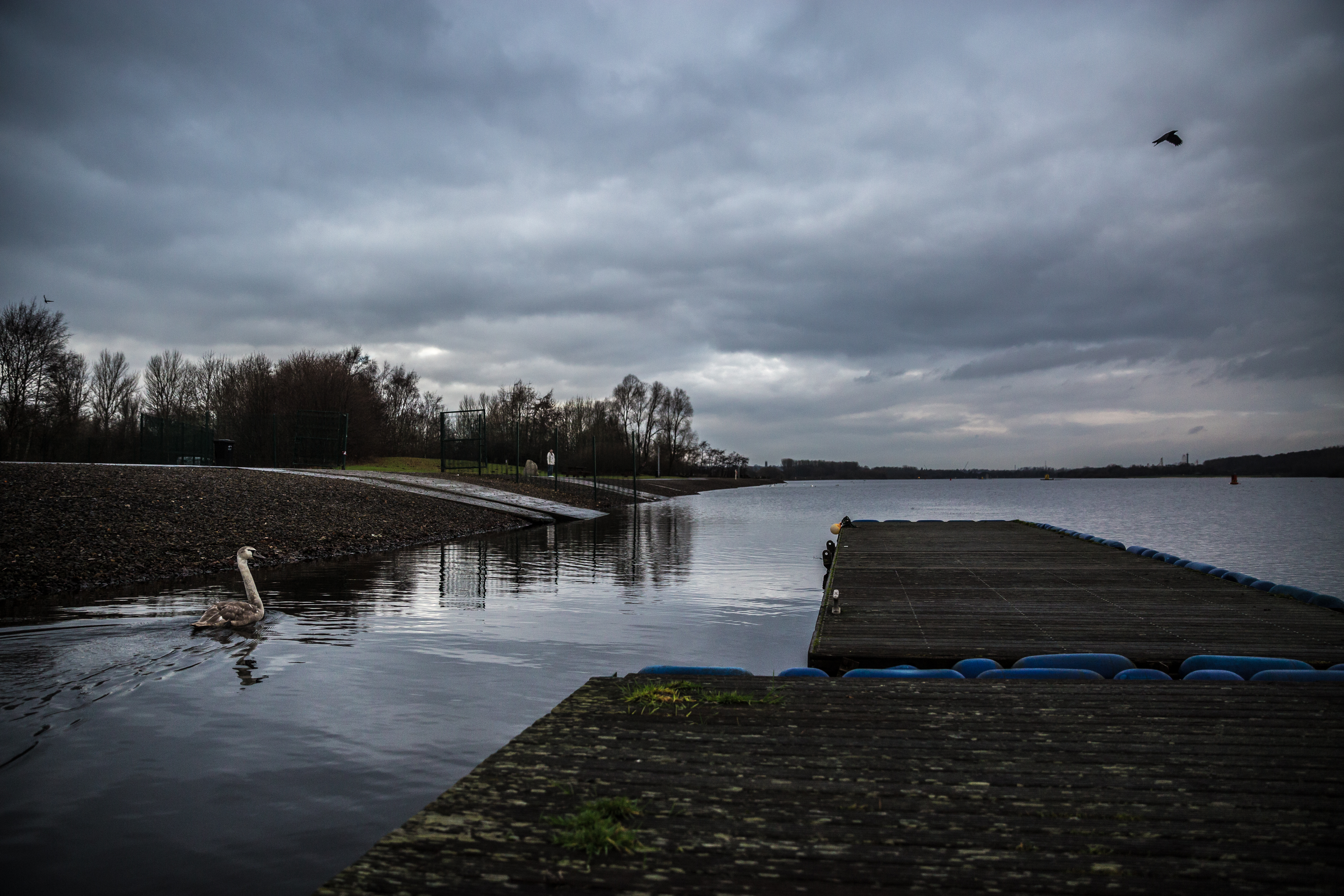
A gloomy day at Strathclyde Park

== In the news ==
In June 2012, Strathclyde Country Park hosted the Western District Open Water Swimming Championship that attracted up to 70 competitors. Following the race, 57 people were discovered to be suffering from stomach cramps, sickness and diarrhoea, five of whom tested positive for norovirus. All water based activities were subsequently temporarily suspended. Experts attributed the incident to heavy rainfall prior to the event, with council officials confirming that tests of the water quality in the days before the event had been within the accepted open water guidelines.

The loch previously had issues with open water events affected by blue and green algae growth, resulting in the cancellation of the Great Scottish Swim in August 2010. In summer 2011, algae growth also put a stop to water sports just two months before the start of the International Children's Games.

== See also ==
- List of Commonwealth Games venues
