= Home International Regatta =

Rowing regatta for the British Isles

- Sport: Rowing
- Founded: 1962
- No. of teams: 4
- Country: (Republic of Ireland) IRL (England) ENG (Scotland) SCO (Wales) WAL

The Home International Regatta is a rowing regatta held every year for the countries of the British Isles - England, Ireland, Scotland, and Wales. Events are held for both men and women at junior (under 18) and senior levels, including Para-rowing events. The race has been held since 1962 and each country takes it in turns to host the event. Prior to moving to Cardiff Bay, Welsh Rowing hosted the event outside Wales on a number of occasions in both Strathclyde and Ghent.

== History ==
At The News of the World sponsored regatta on the Serpentine Regatta in Hyde Park, a Home International or "Quadrangular" was held between 1962 and 1964. The sponsorship was dropped and the competition lapsed, but in 1966 however the competition was revived with a match in Monmouth in Wales. The following year the competition was expanded to include a junior men's match. Women's rowing followed in 1969 and finally a women's junior match in 1984.

In December 2019 a new format was introduced, to reduce the overall team size, improve competition for places, ensuring that the best rowers get the opportunity to represent their country, and helping to support a more aspirational performance pathway event. This requires all rowers will double up from small boats into either a coxless quad or eight. There are also additional sprint races over 500m in coxless quads and eights.

In December 2021, with the growth of the Beach Sprint format internationally and the prospect of the format being introduced to the 2028 LA Olympics it was agreed amongst the Home Nations to introduce a new event the Home International Rowing Beach Sprints (HIRBS). The first event being held by Scotland at St Andrews.

== Trophies ==
The trophies competed for are as follows (brackets designate the donating country):

- Men : The Annamarie Phelps Trophy (England) [This replaced the retired News of the World Cup (England)]
- Women : The Dame Katherine Grainger Quaich (Scotland) [This replaced the missing County of Renfrew Rosebowl (Scotland)]
- Junior Men : The John Hartland Trophy (Wales) [This replaced the retired Duncan Trophy (Scotland)]
- Junior Women : The Irish Travel Agency Cup (Ireland)
- Volunteers :The Griffiths family Trophy (Wales)

== Home Nation Racing colours ==
The racing colours of each country are as follows:

Country	Blade	All-in-one
England	White with the England Rowing logo	White with two red hoops and the England Rowing logo
Ireland	Green	Green with shamrock emblem
Scotland	Blue with white saltire	Blue with white thistle
Wales	Red with white Welsh Dragon	Red with Prince of Wales feathers

== Home International Rowing Regatta Results ==
Year	Venue	Date	SM	SW	JM	JW
2026	London Docklands, England	25 July	ENG	ENG	WAL	SCO
2025	Eton, Dorney, England **	27 July	ENG	ENG	ENG	ENG
2024	Strathclyde Park, Scotland	26 July	ENG	ENG	ENG	ENG
2023	Lough Rynn, Ireland	22 July	ENG	ENG	ENG	ENG
2022	London Docklands, England	23 July	ENG	ENG	ENG	ENG
2021	**	24 July [cancelled - COVID-19]	-	-	-	-
2020	Strathclyde Park, Scotland **	25 July [cancelled - COVID-19]	-	-	-	-
2019	Strathclyde Park, Scotland	27 July	SCO	SCO	SCO	ENG
2018	Inniscarra, Cork, Ireland	21 July	IRL	ENG	ENG	ENG
2017	Strathclyde Park, Scotland #	22 July	ENG	SCO	ENG	ENG
2016	Cardiff Bay, Cardiff, Wales	23 July	ENG	SCO	ENG	ENG
2015	Strathclyde Park, Scotland	25 July	SCO	ENG	IRL	ENG
2014	Inniscarra, Cork, Ireland	26 July	SCO	SCO	ENG	ENG
2013	Holme Pierrepont, Nottingham, England	27 July	ENG	ENG	ENG	ENG
2012	Cardiff Bay, Cardiff, Wales	21 July	WAL	ENG	ENG	ENG
2011	Strathclyde Park, Scotland	23 July	ENG	ENG	ENG	IRL
2010	Inniscarra, Cork, Ireland	24 July	ENG	IRL	WAL	IRL
2009	Holme Pierrepont, Nottingham, England	25 July	ENG	ENG	ENG	IRL
2008	Cardiff Bay, Cardiff, Wales	26 July	ENG	ENG	SCO	ENG
2007	Inniscarra, Cork, Ireland	28 July	ENG	ENG	IRL	IRL
2006	Strathclyde Park, Scotland	22 July	ENG	ENG	SCO	IRL
2005	Cardiff Bay, Cardiff, Wales	23 July	ENG	ENG	ENG	ENG
2004	Holme Pierrepont, Nottingham, England	24 July	ENG	ENG	ENG	IRL
2003	Inniscarra, Cork, Ireland	26 July	ENG	ENG	IRL	ENG
2002	Strathclyde Park, Scotland	27 July	SCO	ENG	ENG	ENG
2001	Holme Pierrepont, Nottingham, England	28 July	ENG	ENG	ENG	ENG
2000	Ghent, Belgium **	22 July	ENG	ENG	ENG	IRL
1999	Inniscarra, Cork, Ireland	24 July	IRL	IRL	IRL	ENG
1998	Strathclyde Park, Scotland	25 July	SCO	ENG	ENG	SCO
1997	Holme Pierrepont, Nottingham, England	26 July	SCO	ENG	ENG	ENG
1996	Strathclyde Park, Scotland **	27 July	ENG	ENG	IRL	IRL
1995	Inniscarra, Cork, Ireland	29 July	ENG	ENG	IRL	IRL
1994	Royal Albert Dock, England	30 July	-	-	ENG	ENG
1993	Strathclyde Park, Scotland	31 July	IRL	ENG	IRL	SCO
1992	Strathclyde Park, Scotland **	25 July	SCO	IRL	IRL	IRL
1991	Blessington, Ireland	3 July	IRL	SCO	IRL	SCO
1990	Holme Pierrepont, Nottingham, England	28 July	SCO	SCO	IRL	IRL
1989	Strathclyde Park, Scotland	29 July	ENG	ENG	ENG	SCO
1988	Blessington, Ireland	23 July	ENG	ENG	IRL	SCO
1987	Talybont, Wales	25 July	ENG	ENG	IRL	IRL
1986	Strathclyde Park, Scotland	27 July	-	-	ENG	ENG
1985	Holme Pierrepont, Nottingham, England	28 July	IRL	IRL	IRL	IRL
1984	Blessington, Ireland	21 July	ENG	ENG	IRL	SCO
1983	Strathclyde Park, Scotland	23 July	IRL	IRL	IRL	-
1982	Holme Pierrepont, Nottingham, England	24 July	ENG	ENG	ENG	-
1981	Llandegfedd Reservoir, Wales	25 July	IRL	ENG	ENG	-
1980	Athlone, Ireland	26 July	ENG	ENG	ENG	-
1979	Strathclyde Park, Scotland	28 July	ENG	ENG	ENG	-
1978	Llandegfedd Reservoir, Wales	28 July	ENG	ENG	ENG	-
1977	The Serpentine, London, England	23 July	ENG	IRL	ENG	-
1976	Inniscarra, Cork, Ireland	24 July	ENG	ENG	ENG	-
1975	Castle Semple Loch, Scotland	26 July	ENG	ENG	ENG	-
1974	Llandegfedd Reservoir, Wales	27 July	ENG	IRL	ENG	-
1973	Holme Pierrepont, Nottingham, England	21 July	ENG	ENG	ENG	-
1972	Blessington, Ireland	15 July	ENG	ENG	IRL	-
1971	Castle Semple Loch, Scotland	17 July	ENG	ENG	ENG	-
1970	Molesey, London, England	18 July	ENG	ENG	ENG	-
1969	Monmouth, Wales	19 July	ENG	ENG	ENG	-
1968	Blessington, Ireland	20 July	ENG	-	IRL	-
1967	Loch Lomond, Scotland	15 July	IRL	-	IRL	-
1966	Monmouth, Wales	19 July	SCO	-	-	-
1965	-	-	-	-	-	-
1964	The Serpentine, London, England	8 August	ENG	-	-	-
1963	The Serpentine, London, England	10 August	SCO	-	-	-
1962	The Serpentine, London, England	11 August	ENG	-	-	-

'** Hosted by Welsh Rowing.

'# Hosted by English Rowing

The last 4 columns refer to the overall winner in each of the event categories: Senior Men (SM), Senior Women (SW), Junior Men (JM), and Junior Women (JW).

The match winners are found from calculating the total number of points won by each country in each section (e.g. Junior Women). Countries receive 4 points for 1st place, 3 points for 2nd place, 2 points for 3rd place and 1 point for 4th.

== Home International Rowing Beach Sprints ==
Year	Venue	Date	Winner
2026	Narin Beach, Scotland	19 September	
2025	Portnoo, Ireland	20 September	WAL
2024	Bournmouth, England	28 September	ENG
2023	Saundersfoot, Wales	9 September	WAL
2022	St Andrews, Scotland	20 August	SCO

== See also ==
- British Rowing
- Rowing Ireland
- Scottish Rowing
- Welsh Rowing
