= Bothwellhaugh Roman Fort =

Architectural structure in North Lanarkshire, Scotland

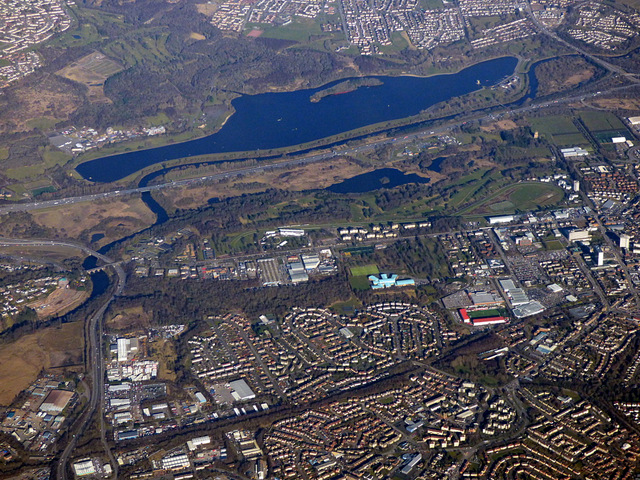
- The fort was located on land which is now to the north of Strathclyde Loch

- Location within North Lanarkshire
- 55.7965°N 4.0260°W
- Location: Strathclyde Country Park, North Lanarkshire, Scotland

Bothwellhaugh Roman Fort is a site now located within Strathclyde Country Park in North Lanarkshire, Scotland. It is east of where the South Calder Water flows into Strathclyde Loch. The fort is a scheduled monument.

== Location ==
Before the flooding of Bothwellhaugh village to create the loch, the site overlooked the point where the Roman road bridged the South Calder Water near its confluence with the River Clyde. The Roman Road was known as Watling Street; it is shown on old maps from before the diversion of the Clyde and before the rediscovery of the fort. In terms of large towns the fort is west of Motherwell, to which it is closest, north of Hamilton, and south of Bellshill.

== Discovery ==
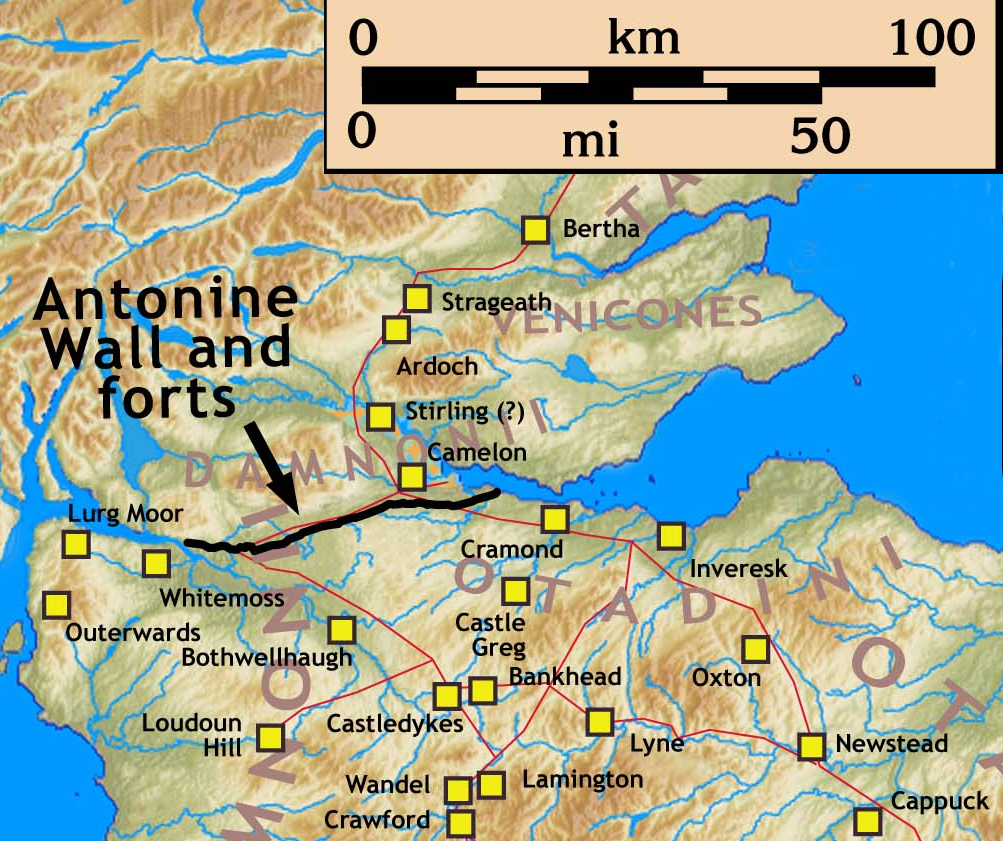
Forts near Bothwellhaugh including those on the Antonine Wall. There was a road south along the east bank of the Clyde to Castledykes.

Mention of a Roman structure is made in the Dalziel section of the Old Statistical Account. The fort was rediscovered by J. M. Davidson in 1925. The fort was built in a scalene right quadrilateral pattern and was large enough to house both troops and cavalry.

The fort is likely to have been linked by roads to sites on the Antonine Wall and south at Castledykes but exactly how they were connected is a matter of ongoing study.

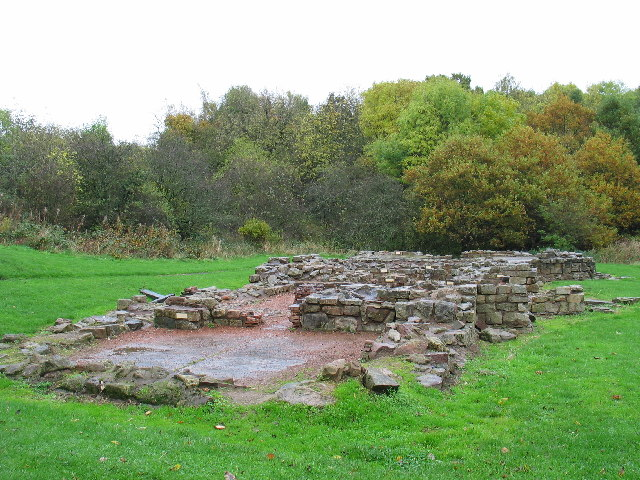
Roman bath house near the fort

A Roman bath house was subsequently found between the fort and medieval bridge anachronistically named 'Roman Bridge'. The bath house, which was found in November 1973 beneath a pond, was moved to higher ground in 1980 and is now open to the public. The complete excavation was carried out in 1975-76 under the direction of Lawrence Keppie. The bath house was made up of: a Vestibule, a Frigidarium (cold room with cold plunge bath), a first and second Tepidarium (warm rooms), a Caldarium (hot room with nearby hot bath), and a Praefurnium (furnace room). Perhaps around 20 soldiers at a time could use the bath house.

Hundreds of artifacts were taken from the excavations on the site to the Hunterian Museum at Glasgow University. These include a Roman drain cover slab, a hunt cup, and tile with a paw print. Pottery from the site has established an Antonine occupation but how the site relates to the Antonine Wall remains unclear. The full catalog of the finds is available along with many sketches.

The distance from the thermae (baths) to the fort suggests there are other, as yet undiscovered structures.

== See also ==
- Bearsden Baths (Another nearby Roman site)
