= North Lanarkshire =

Council area of Scotland

North Lanarkshire: Siorrachd Lannraig a Tuath (Scottish Gaelic); North Lanrikshire (Scots)
- Council area
- Coat of arms

- North Lanarkshire shown within Scotland
- Coordinates: 55.829°N 3.922°W
- Sovereign state: United Kingdom
- Country: Scotland
- Lieutenancy area: Lanarkshire (part); Dunbartonshire (part)
- Unitary authority: 1 April 1996
- Administrative HQ: Motherwell Civic Centre

Government
  - Type: Council
  - Body: North Lanarkshire Council
  - Control: No overall control
  - MPs: 4 MPs: Frank McNally (L); Pamela Nash (L); Kenneth Stevenson (L); Katrina Murray (L)
  - MSPs: 5 MSPs: Jamie Hepburn (SNP); Stephanie Callaghan (SNP); Clare Adamson (SNP); Fulton MacGregor (SNP); Neil Gray (SNP)

Area
  - Total: 180 sq mi (470 km^{2})
  - Rank: 19th

Population (2024)
  - Total: 344,540
  - Rank: 4th
  - Density: 1,900/sq mi (733/km^{2})
- Time zone: UTC+0 (GMT)
  - Summer (DST): UTC+1 (BST)
- ISO 3166 code: GB-NLK
- GSS code: S12000050
- Website: northlanarkshire.gov.uk

North Lanarkshire (Scots: North Lanrikshire; Scottish Gaelic: Siorrachd Lannraig a Tuath) is one of the 32 council areas of Scotland. It borders the north-east of Glasgow and contains many of the wider Greater Glasgow settlements and areas. It also borders East Dunbartonshire, Falkirk, Stirling, South Lanarkshire, and West Lothian. The council area covers parts of the historic counties of Dunbartonshire, Lanarkshire, and Stirlingshire. The council is based in Motherwell.

The area was formed in 1996, covering the districts of Cumbernauld and Kilsyth, Motherwell, and Monklands, plus the Chryston and Auchinloch areas from Strathkelvin district, all of which had been in the Strathclyde region between 1975 and 1996. As a new single-tier authority, North Lanarkshire became responsible for all functions previously performed by both the regional council and the district councils, which were abolished.

== History ==
The largest part of North Lanarkshire, being the approximately two-thirds of the council area lying generally south of the Luggie Water, was in the historic county of Lanarkshire. Lanarkshire had existed as a shire from around the time of King David I, who ruled Scotland from 1124 to 1153. The county took its name from the original county town at Lanark, now in South Lanarkshire, which had been the site of the first Parliament of Scotland under Kenneth II in 978. The northern parts of what is now North Lanarkshire were in the counties of Dunbartonshire and Stirlingshire prior to 1975, with Cumbernauld and the area generally north of Luggie Water and south of the River Kelvin being in Dunbartonshire, and Kilsyth and the area north of the Kelvin being in Stirlingshire. Prior to the 1975 reforms there were five burghs in the area now covered by North Lanarkshire:

- Airdrie
- Coatbridge
- Cumbernauld (burgh status given in 1968 following growth of the new town)
- Kilsyth
- Motherwell and Wishaw (formerly two separate burghs prior to merging in 1920)

The population of the area which would become North Lanarkshire grew quickly during the Industrial Revolution. In the 18th century the area's towns, including Motherwell, were active in textile production. The discovery of coal and iron ore deposits in the 19th century, as well as the building of the Glasgow to Edinburgh railway, transformed the region. The towns of Motherwell, Coatbridge and Wishaw became centres of the iron and steel industry.

These industries began to decline in the second half of the 20th century, while a growth occurred in the financial and technology sectors, as well as a growth in logistics services related to the heavy goods traffic in the area. The new town of Cumbernauld expanded rapidly after World War II, and is now the largest town in North Lanarkshire. The growth of the Greater Glasgow metropolitan area into the south-western part of North Lanarkshire has also led to a large number of residential areas for commuters.

The North Lanarkshire council area was established in 1996 as part of a reorganisation of local government in the United Kingdom. This was the latest in a series of reforms, notably including the creation of Lanarkshire County Council in 1890 under the Local Government (Scotland) Act 1889, and the abolition of the county councils and creation of Strathclyde Regional Council and lower-tier district councils in 1975 under the Local Government (Scotland) Act 1973. The 1996 reform abolished Strathclyde, and established North Lanarkshire as a merger of the districts of Cumbernauld and Kilsyth, Monklands, Motherwell and the Chryston area from Strathkelvin district (the rest of which went to East Dunbartonshire).

For lieutenancy purposes, North Lanarkshire straddles the Lanarkshire and Dunbartonshire lieutenancies, with the area generally north of Luggie Water (including Cumbernauld and Kilsyth) coming under the Dunbartonshire lieutenancy and the remainder coming under the Lanarkshire lieutenancy.

== Geography ==
North Lanarkshire lies in the Central Valley of Scotland, to the east of Glasgow. It lies on the Scotland's north–south watershed with the River Clyde flowing through the west of the county on its way to the Irish Sea, and the River Almond in the east emptying into the Firth of Forth near Edinburgh. The northern areas consist of forests as well as higher areas such as the Kilsyth Hills.

== Demographics ==
The highest population density of North Lanarkshire is in the urbanised south-west, which is part of the Greater Glasgow metropolitan area. Northern and eastern areas are more rural in character, with agricultural activity such as dairy and meat farming.

Ethnic Group	2001		2011		2022	
Ethnic Group	Number	%	Number	%	Number	%
White: Total	317,026	98.74%	330,679	97.91%	327,207	95.96%
White: Scottish	304,784	94.93%	313,356	92.78%	302,736	88.79%
White: Other British	6,954	2.17%	7,892	2.34%	12,267	3.60%
White: Irish	3,188	0.99%	4,394	1.30%	3,188	0.93%
White: Gypsy/Traveller (Note: New category created for the 2011 census)	–	–	205	0.06%	131	–
White: Polish	–	–	3,009	0.89%	5,357	1.57%
White: Other	2,100	0.65%	1,823	0.54%	3,526	1.03%
Asian, Asian Scottish or Asian British: Total	3,122	0.97%	5,385	1.59%	8,328	2.44%
Asian, Asian Scottish or Asian British: Indian	527	0.16%	997	0.30%	1,487	0.44%
Asian, Asian Scottish or Asian British: Pakistani	1,756	0.55%	3,003	0.89%	5,024	1.47%
Asian, Asian Scottish or Asian British: Bangladeshi	19	–	42	–	75	–
Asian, Asian Scottish or Asian British: Chinese	607	0.19%	898	0.27%	1,103	0.32%
Asian, Asian Scottish or Asian British: Asian Other	213	0.07%	445	0.13%	638	0.19%
Black, Black Scottish or Black British (Note: Category restructured for the 2011 census)	45	–	–	–	–	–
African: Total	92	–	532	0.16%	1,853	0.54%
African: African, African Scottish or African British	–	–	523	0.15%	227	0.07%
African: Other African	–	–	9	–	1,626	0.48%
Caribbean or Black: Total	–	–	171	0.05%	236	0.07%
Caribbean	59	–	83	–	80	–
Black	–	–	77	–	15	–
Caribbean or Black: Other	–	–	11	–	138	–
Mixed or multiple ethnic groups: Total	479	0.15%	708	0.21%	2,130	0.62%
Other: Total	244	0.08%	252	0.07%	1,219	0.36%
Other: Arab	–	–	134	–	484	0.14%
Other: Any other ethnic group	–	–	118	–	735	0.22%
Total:	321,067	100.00%	337,727	100.00%	340,973	100.00%

=== Languages ===
The 2022 Scottish Census reported that out of 331,131 residents aged three and over, 112,405 (33.9%) considered themselves able to speak or read the Scots language.

The 2022 Scottish Census reported that out of 331,130 residents aged three and over, 2,927 (0.9%) considered themselves able to speak or read Gaelic.

== Settlements ==
The largest settlements in North Lanarkshire

Largest settlements by population:

Settlement	Population (2020)
Cumbernauld	50,530
Coatbridge	43,950
Airdrie	36,390
Motherwell	32,840
Wishaw	30,050
Bellshill	19,700
Viewpark	15,830
Kilsyth	10,380
Shotts	8,630
Stepps	7,700 (Note: Part of Stepps is in the Glasgow City council area)
Chapelhall	7,140
Moodiesburn	6,830
Newarthill	6,720
New Stevenston	6,070
Newmains	5,430
Holytown	5,100
Carfin	3,870
Bargeddie	3,210
Cleland	3,150
Chryston	3,100

== Places of interest ==
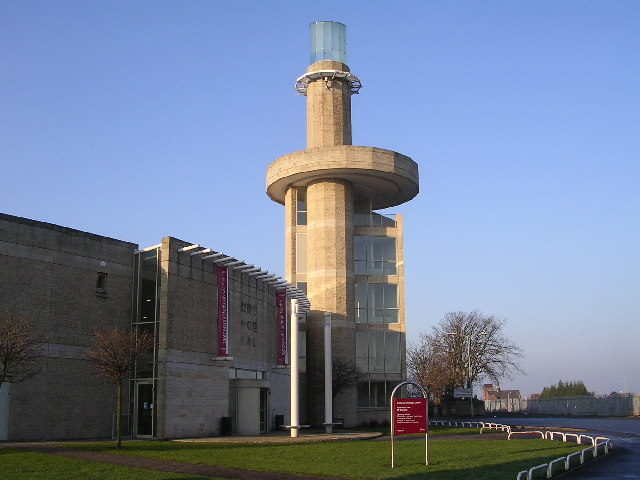
North Lanarkshire Heritage Centre

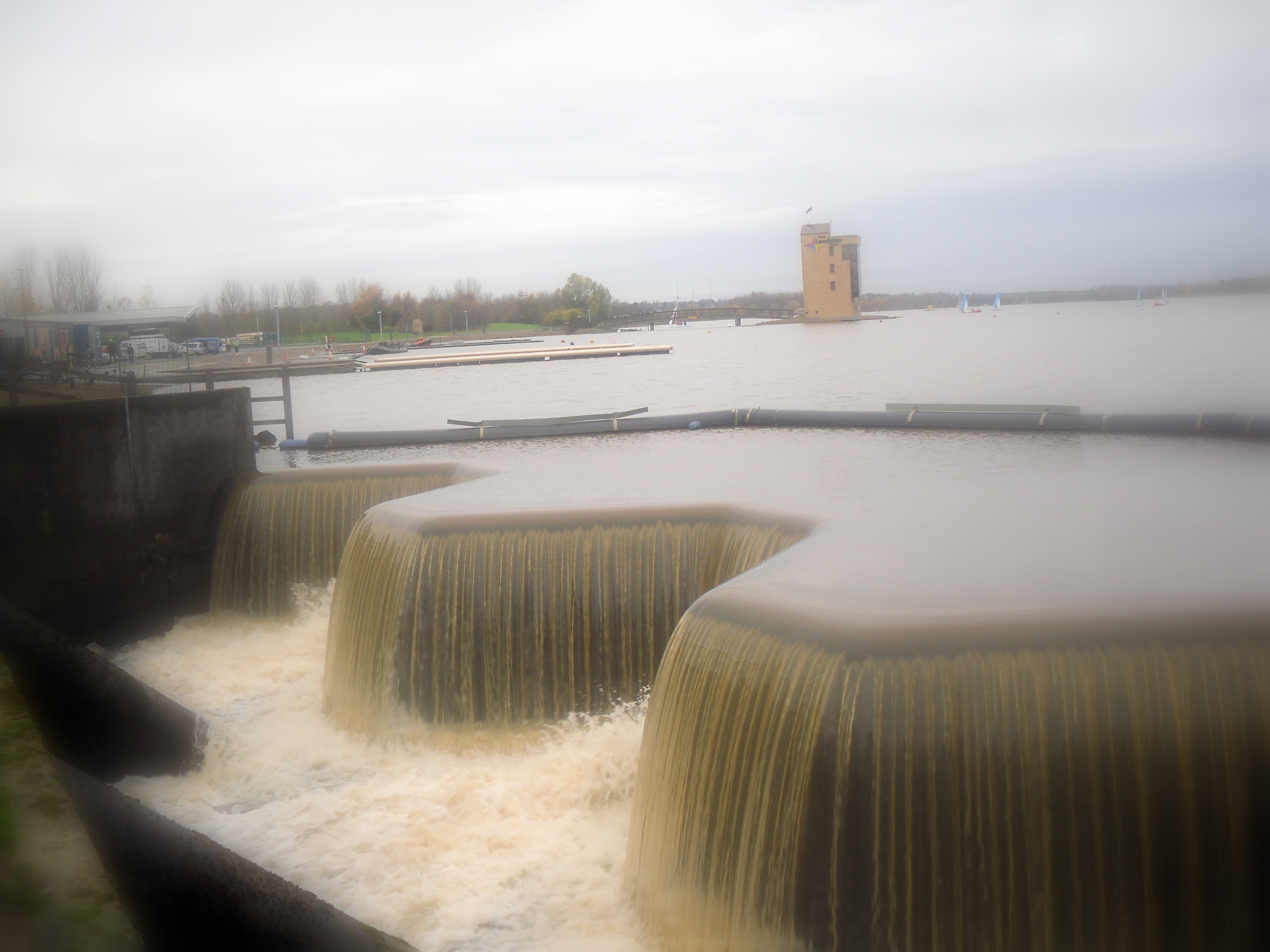
Strathclyde Country Park

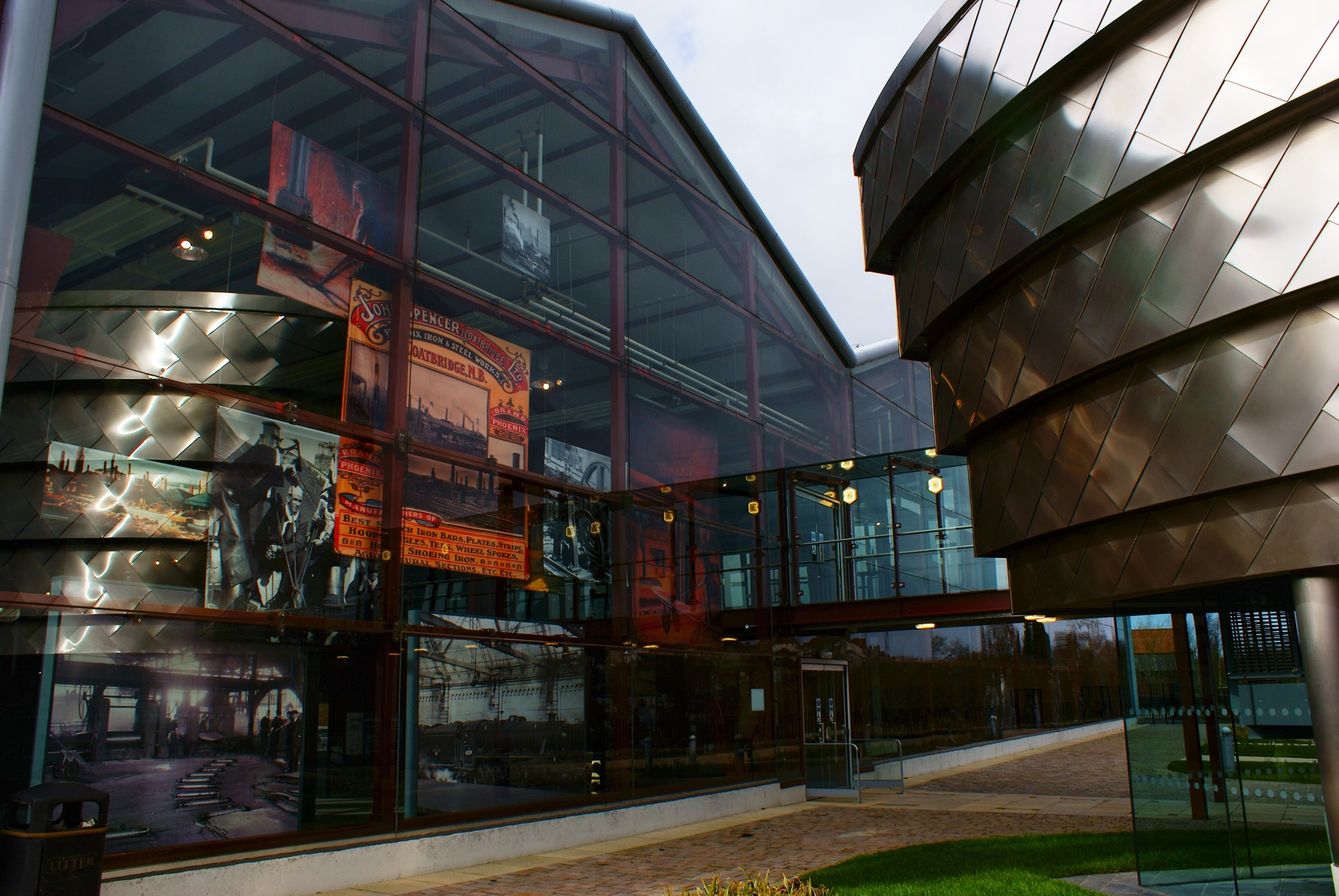
Summerlee Museum of Scottish Industrial Life

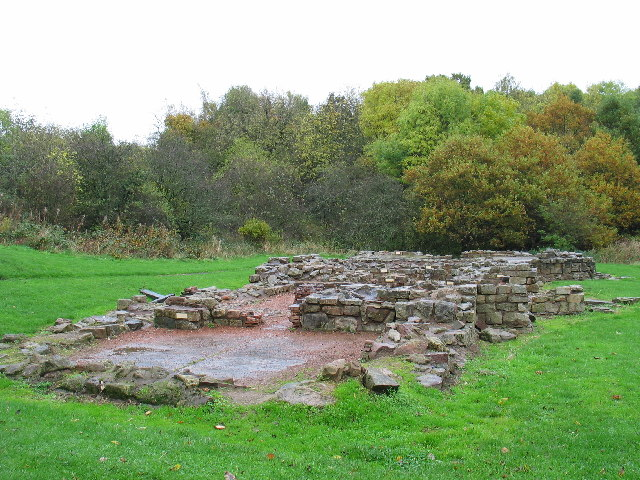
Remains of a Roman bath house near the Bothwellhaugh Roman Fort

- Airdrie Public Observatory
- Antonine Wall: Croy Hill and Westerwood Roman fort
- Arria Statue
- Auchinstarry Quarry
- Bedlay Castle
- Bothwellhaugh Roman Fort
- Cambusnethan House
- Carfin Grotto
- Carron Valley Reservoir
- Colzium
- Dalzell House
- Dalziel Park
- Drumpellier Country Park
- Duncarron
- Greenhead Moss
- Jerviston
- M&D's
- Mosswater Local Nature Reserve
- North Lanarkshire Heritage Centre
- Palacerigg Country Park
- Ravenscraig Regional Sports Facility
- Strathclyde Country Park
- Summerlee Museum of Scottish Industrial Life
- The Time Capsule
- World of Wings

== Wider politics ==
=== Referendums ===
North Lanarkshire was one of the four council areas which had a majority "Yes" vote in the Scottish Independence Referendum at 51.1%.. The other council areas voting "Yes" were Dundee (57.3%), West Dunbartonshire (54.0%), and Glasgow (53.5%).
