= M&D's =

Amusement park in Scotland

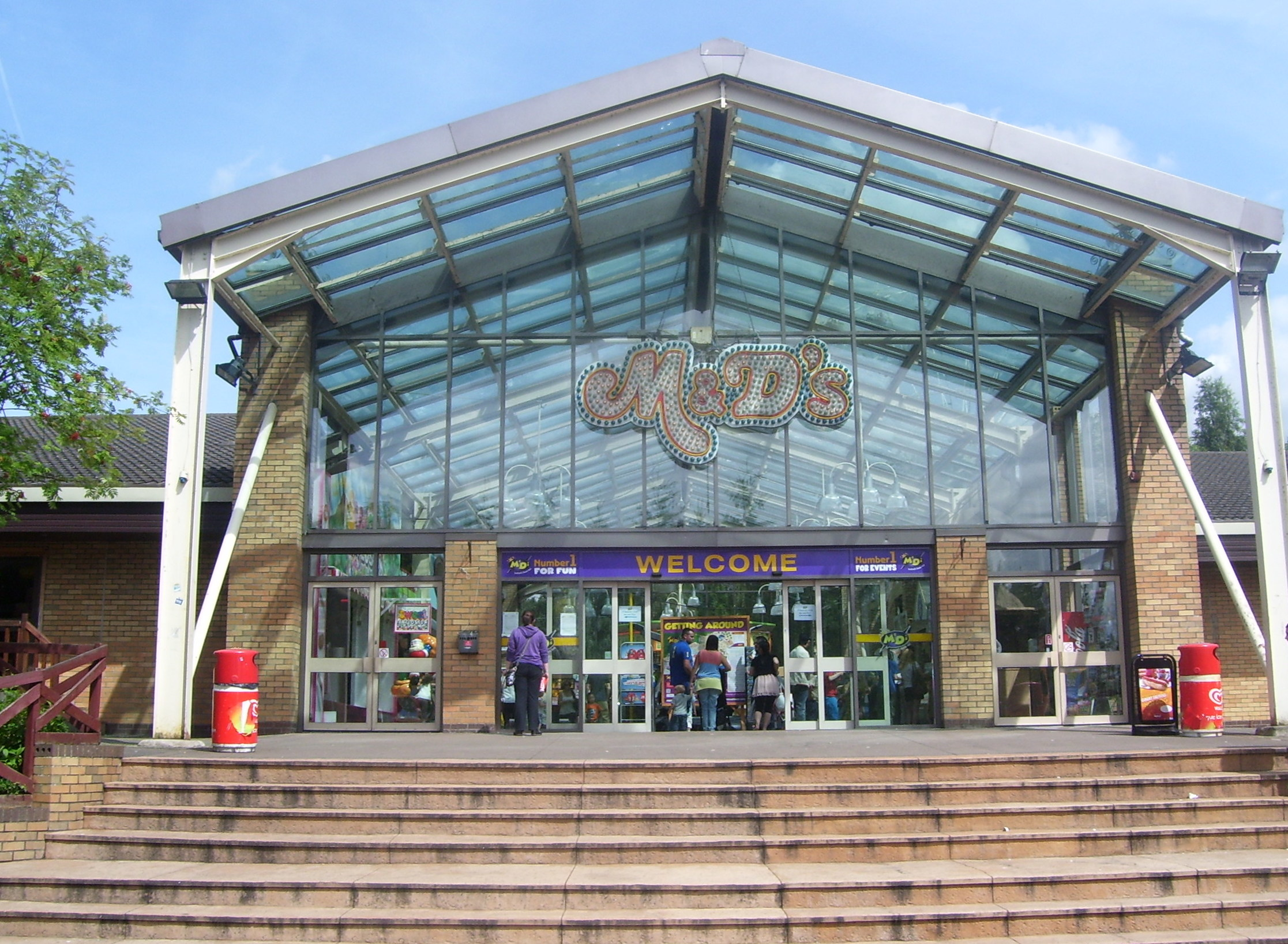
- M&D's entrance
- Interactive map of M&D's
- Location: Motherwell, Lanarkshire, Scotland
- Coordinates: 55.80011°N 4.03966°W
- Status: Operating
- Opened: 1996
- Closed: Unknown
- Owner: Lochview Theme Park
- Slogan: "Scotland's Theme Park"

Attractions
- Total: 41 attractions
- Roller coasters: 0
- Water rides: 1
- Website: www.scotlandsthemepark.com

M&D's is an amusement park located in Motherwell, North Lanarkshire, Scotland. Bordering on Strathclyde Park, the park contains two rollercoasters, one water ride, several fairground rides, an arcade, a theatre, Cosmic Bowl and an indoor tropical house, Amazonia.

In 2018, North Lanarkshire Council approved an expansion proposal from the park.

The park went into administration on 23 April 2020, but was purchased on 22 June 2020.

== Attractions ==
M&D's theme park has many rides and attractions, including two roller coasters (previously four), several fairground-type rides, and many more rides designed for young children. Most were travelling rides owned by the park's operators, travelling showmen Matthew and Douglas Taylor.

=== Roller coasters ===
- Runaway Mine Train: Prior to 2007, this roller coaster had spinning cars and a tire-propelled lift. These were replaced with a traditional fixed train and chain lift. During the winter maintenance the train was painted from grey to red.
- Big Apple: A children's roller coaster with a green caterpillar cart and is a good first roller coaster for younger children.

=== Thrill rides ===
- Air Raid:, introduced in 2024, and built by UK manufacturer Tivoli Manufacturing, this is a thrill ride in M&D's that spins the user. The ride spent the 2022 season on loan at Alton Towers as Spinjam.
- Chair Swing: A 32-seat Swing ride
- Captain's Curse: A Pirate Ship ride. It was absent from the park during the 2007–2008 season for refurbishment.
- Miami - Rip Tide: A Miami Trip. Replaced 'Fast & Furious'. In the 2022 season of M&D's.

=== Water rides ===
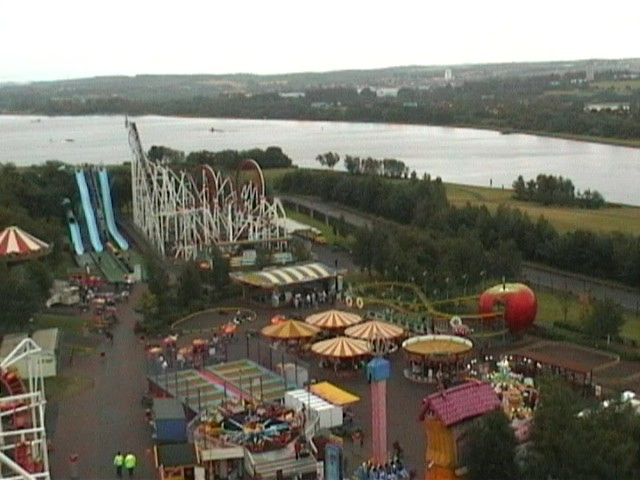
A number of rides at the park are pictured: at the far left is Moby's Revenge, the water slides.

- Moby's Revenge: A three-lane dinghy water slide. The rightmost slide is a steep, straight chute, the middle slide is a shallower straight slide with dips, and the leftmost one is a spiral slide.

=== Junior Rides and Attractions ===
- Trampolines: 10 trampoline beds. Roughly around 5 minutes per session
- Mini Dodgems
- "Flying Dumbos": an elephant ride that is based on Walt Disney's hit film Dumbo.

Pirate Ship frog hoppers: bounce up and down but the noise it makes can get Annoying at times.

=== Entertainment ===
High Diving Pirates: a show performed during summer.

=== Past rides ===
- Kamikaze, a Ranger, closed in 2005.
- The Bomber Mark 2: A Fabbri Booster. Closed in 2014.
- The Giant Condor: The only one of its kind in Europe. Riders go up 30 meters in 28 2-seater gondolas. It debuted in the 2015 season as a replacement to The Bomber Mark 2.
- Space Coaster (formerly called Cobra and then Express): it was sold after the 2015 season to Oakwood Theme Park.
- Tsunami: Manufactured by Pinfari, was the only inverted roller coaster in Scotland. It closed due to an accident on 26 June 2016. Formally closed on 27 February 2017.
- Tornado: Was the park's largest roller coaster. Manufactured by Pinfari, with over 1 km of track. The track contains two 360-degree vertical loops in addition to several banked turns, pulling −2 Gs at some points. This ride has a top speed of over 80 km/h. It formerly had a corkscrew which was removed after the 2005 season due to being exceptionally rough. It was sold in November 2020 to Parc d'Attractions Marseillan-Plage.
- Big Apple (1st): A children's roller coaster, which used to travel through a large fiber glass apple. It was removed in 2021 and relocated to Web Adventure Park.
- Mad Mouse: A Spinning Wild Mouse roller coaster. 2016–2021.
- Magic Carpet: Formerly known as "Ali Baba's Carpet" was a Magic Carpet ride, with a capacity of 40 people. The ride reaches a height of 14 m and a top speed of 14 rpm. It was replaced with a newer model in the 2017 season.
- Fast & Furious: A Miami Trip. It replaced the Magic Carpet at the start of the 2020/21 season.

White Water: a log flume at M&D's for years then was removed in the winter of the 2023 season and was replaced by Space and Air rade Charlie Hornes King Sizzler. Was put in on 2020 and removed in October 2021 Sheldon Evans Sizzler Replaced King Sizzler In The same location during Xmas 2021 and brought back in Xmas 2022 Big Wheel (1) Sold.In 2022 to Touque Traveling Big Wheel (2) Rented in 2020 For Xmas Walter Murphy Big Wheel (The View 3) Rented in 2022 By M&D's for Xmas and is a Fun Fair Ride

=== Other attractions ===
- Amazonia: The only indoor rainforest in the whole of Scotland, it contains exotic animals such as the poison dart frog, tarantula and python.
- Devil's Island: An 18-hole miniature golf course, played over water and in caves.
- Krazy Congo: Giant indoor soft play-area, for young children.
- Gamezone: Giant amusement arcade, containing over 150 different games, including the most recently developed games.
- Alona Hotel: The on-site hotel for visitors staying for a period of time. It contains a glasshouse restaurant and bar and an atrium for views overlooking the Strathclyde Loch.

== Incidents ==
In June 2009, six people were stranded on the park's Tornado roller coaster when high winds caused the safety systems to activate.

On 4 July 2011, nine people, ranging in age from 9 to 49, had to be rescued from the Tsunami roller coaster. Due to a mechanical failure on the ride, the group was stranded 60 ft (18.2m) above the ground for a total of eight long hours.

In 2013 there was an incident on the White Water Log Flume where a teenage girl's leg was trapped between a barrier and a splash back on the ride's structure, causing a serious injury.

In August 2015, three people were injured when the White Water Log Flume slipped on its track, and later the same month a 58-year-old woman and three teenagers were forced to walk down from the top of the ride after it got stuck at the highest point.

In March 2016, eight people had to be rescued from the Tornado roller coaster after it became stuck 20 ft (6.09m) above the ground.

On 26 June 2016, the roller coaster Tsunami derailed, injuring eight children and two adults, which make a total of ten people. On the way down it hit the main structure and came to rest on the walkway.
