= List of railway bridges and viaducts in the United Kingdom =

This is a list of viaducts and significant bridges of the United Kingdom's railways, past and present.

Name	Location	Country	Length	Date	Type	Grade	Notes	Image
Accrington Viaduct	Accrington, Lancashire	England	231.6 m (760 ft)	1847	Brick arch	II	Carried the East Lancashire Railway, 1847, by J.S. Perring and D.A. Donaldson; restored 1866–7. Curving line of 21 semicircular brick arches (40 ft. span, 60 ft. high) with stone plinths, gritstone facings, rusticated voussoirs, roll-moulded string course, and parapet. At the south end the line crosses Blackburn road on a segmental arched bridge with battered rock-faced abutments; at the north end are 3 similar arches, (the centre bridging Whalley Road), separated from the main structure by a short embankment. West side of 5th arch of viaduct has keystone lettered "RH" M 1847 (= Richard Hacking, Manager).	
Adam Viaduct	Wigan, Greater Manchester	England	37 m (121 ft)	1946	Prestressed concrete	II	Carries the Kirkby branch line over the River Douglas	
Albert Edward Bridge	Coalbrookdale, Shropshire	England	60 m (200 ft)	1864		II	Carried the former Wenlock, Craven Arms and Lightmoor Extension Railway across the River Severn	
Almond Valley Viaduct	West Lothian	Scotland	2,414 m (7,920 ft)	1842	Stone arch	Cat A	Opened in 1842. 32 spans.	
Almondell Viaduct	East Calder, West Lothian	Scotland	108 m (354 ft)	1868	Stone arch	Cat B	Also known as Camps Viaduct. Over the River Almond, Lothian. Closed in 1959, now a footpath.	
Alston Arches Viaduct	Haltwhistle, Northumberland	England		1851		II	Carried the former Haltwhistle to Alston Branch Line across the valley of the South Tyne River	
Angarrack viaduct	Hayle, Cornwall	England	240 m (790 ft)	1885	Stone arch	II	Carries the Cornish Main Line across the Angarrack River	
Appleford Railway Bridge	Appleford-on-Thames, Oxfordshire	England		1844			Carries the Cherwell Valley Line over the River Thames	
Arnos Park Viaduct	Arnos Park, London	England		1933	Brick arch		Carries London Underground's Piccadilly line	
Arnside viaduct	Arnside, Cumbria	England	505 m (1,657 ft)	1915			Carries the Lancaster to West Cumbria line over the River Kent	
Arten Gill Viaduct	Stone House, Cumbria	England	201 m (659 ft)	1875	Sandstone, Dent Marble arches	II	35.7m high with 11 spans.	
Arthington Viaduct a.k.a. Wharfedale Viaduct	Arthington, West Yorkshire	England	460 m (1,510 ft)	1849	Stone arch	II	21 arches. Crosses the Wharfe valley. Carries the Leeds to Harrogate line. Also known as Castley Viaduct	
Avonbank Viaduct	Whitecross, Falkirk	Scotland	105 m (344 ft)	1847	Stone arch	Cat B	Also known as Birkhill Viaduct. Carries the heritage Bo'ness and Kinneil Railway over the River Avon.	
Avon Bridge	Bristol	England		1839		I	Designed by Isambard Kingdom Brunel	
Balcombe Viaduct a.k.a. Ouse Valley Viaduct	Balcombe, West Sussex	England	450 m (1,480 ft)	1841	Brick arch	II*	Carries London-Brighton Railway Line across the Ouse Valley	
Ballochmyle Viaduct	River Ayr, East Ayrshire	Scotland	145 m (476 ft)	1848		Cat. A	Highest extant railway viaduct in Britain. Formerly largest masonry arch in the world.	
Bann Bridge	Coleraine, County Londonderry	Northern Ireland		1924			Bascule bridge carrying the NI Railways Belfast–Derry line over the River Bann	
Barmouth Bridge	Barmouth, Gwynedd	Wales	699 m (2,293 ft)	1867		II*	Carries Cambrian Coast Railway across the River Mawddach estuary	
Barnes Railway Bridge	Barnes, London	England		1895			Carries the Hounslow Loop Line over the River Thames	
Bassaleg Viaduct	Newport, Wales	Wales		1826	Stone arch	II*	Second-oldest operational railway bridge in the world, after the Skerne Bridge.	
Battersea Railway Bridge a.k.a. Cremorne Bridge	Battersea, London	England	185 m (607 ft)	1863	Wrought iron arch		Carries the West London line over the River Thames	
Belvidere Bridge	Shrewsbury	England		1848	Arch	II*	Two spans at 31 m (34 yd) each in length	
Belah Viaduct	Barras, Cumbria	England	320 m (1,050 ft)	1861	Lattice girder		Crossed the River Belah. Demolished in 1963.	
Bennerley Viaduct	Awsworth, Nottinghamshire	England	443 m (1,453 ft)	1877	wrought iron girder	II*	Carried the Great Northern Railway across the Erewash Valley	
Berwyn Viaduct	River Dee, Denbighshire	Wales			Stone arch	II	On the Llangollen Railway heritage line.	
Betley Bridge	River Adur, West Sussex	England					Now part of the Downs Link footpath.	
Bickleigh Viaduct	Bickleigh, Devon	England						
Big Water of Fleet Viaduct	Big Water of Fleet, Galloway	Scotland					Carried the Portpatrick Railway (the 'Port Road') which ran from Dumfries to Stranraer, now disused.	
Birdsmill Viaduct	Newbridge, Edinburgh	Scotland	110 m (360 ft)	1849	Stone arch	Cat B	Carries the North Clyde Line over the River Almond.	
Bittaford Viaduct	Ivybridge, Devon	England						
Blatchford Viaduct	Ivybridge, Devon	England		1893	Granite and brick arch	II	Carries Great Western Railway over the Yealm valley	
Blackfriars Railway Bridge (current)	Blackfriars, London	England		1886				
Blackfriars Railway Bridge (former/original)	Blackfriars, London	England		1865			Only supports remain.	
Black Potts Railway Bridge and Viaduct	Windsor	England		1850			Carries Staines to Windsor & Eton Line over the River Thames	
Bleach Green Viaduct	Newtownabbey, County Antrim	Northern Ireland		1933			Part of a burrowing junction carrying the Belfast–Derry line over the Belfast-Larne line	
Bletchley Flyover	Bletchley, Buckinghamshire	England	605 m (1,985 ft)	1959	Reinforced concrete viaduct		Carried the former Varsity Line over the West Coast Main Line. As of August 2020, being restored for use in East West Rail.	
Bolitho Viaduct	Liskeard, Cornwall	England	166 m (545 ft)	1882				
Border Counties Bridge	River Tyne, Hexham, Northumberland	England		1856			Only supports remain.	
Bourne End Railway Bridge	River Thames, Bourne End, Buckinghamshire	England		1895			Originally carried Broad Gauge.	
Bourne Valley Viaducts	River Bourne, Dorset	England		1888	Brick arch		Carries the South West Main Line.	
Boythorpe Viaduct	Chesterfield, Derbyshire	England		1897	Brick arch		Closed 1957 and demolished.	
Brackley Viaduct	Brackley, Northamptonshire	England	230 m (750 ft)	1896	Brick arch		Carried the Great Central line over the River Great Ouse. Demolished in 1978	
Braidhurst Viaduct	Forgewood, North Lanarkshire	Scotland	186 m (610 ft)	1857	Stone arch	Cat B	Also known as the Jerviston Viaduct. Carries the Motherwell to Cumbernauld Line over the South Calder Water.	
Braunstone Gate Bridge	Leicester	England	4.8 m (16 ft)	1898	Bowstring lattice girder		Carried the Great Central Main Line over Braunstone Gate. Demolished 2009	
Breydon Viaduct	Great Yarmouth, Norfolk	England	240 m (790 ft)	1903	Truss swing bridge		Crossed the River Yare. Closed 1953 and demolished.	
Britannia Bridge	Menai Strait at Anglesey	Wales	461 m (1,512 ft)	1850			Partially rebuilt in 1970 after a fire.	
Broadbottom Viaduct a.k.a. Etherow Viaduct	Broadbottom, Derbyshire	England	155 m (509 ft)	1842		II	Crosses the River Etherow	
Broadsands Viaduct	Goodrington Sands, Devon	England	66 m (217 ft)				Carries the Dartmouth Steam Railway heritage line.	
Brooksbottom Viaduct	Summerseat, Lancashire	England			Stone arch		Carries the East Lancashire Railway heritage line over the River Irwell	
Broxburn Viaduct	Broxburn, West Lothian	Scotland	89 m (292 ft)	1842	Stone arch	Cat A	Carries the Glasgow-Edinburgh via Falkirk line over the A89 road.	
Burntisland Viaduct	Burntisland, Fife	Scotland		1888	Lattice girder	Cat C	Carries Edinburgh-Dundee line	
Bushey Arches	Watford, Hertfordshire	England			Stone arch	II		
Butterley Causeway	Butterley Reservoir, Derbyshire	England					Carries the Midland Railway - Butterley heritage line.	
Byker Viaduct	Ouseburn, Tyne and Wear	England	815 m (2,674 ft)	1982			Carries the Tyne and Wear Metro	
Cadishead Viaduct	Salford and Trafford	England	37 m (121 ft)	1893	Lattice girder		Disused and corroded	
Calder Grove Viaduct	Wakefield	England					(disused)	
Calstock Viaduct	Calstock, Cornwall	England	225 m (738 ft) c.	1907	Concrete block arch	II*	Carries railway across River Tamar	
Cann Viaduct	Bickleigh, Devon	England		1859			now part of the Plym Valley Cycle Track	
Cannington Viaduct	Uplyme, Devon	England		1903	Concrete arch	II	(disused)	
Cannon Street Railway Bridge	London	England		1866	Cast-iron girder		Crosses the River Thames	
Carbis Bay Viaduct	Carbis Bay, Cornwall	England						
Carlisle Bridge, Lancaster	Lancaster	England	120 m (390 ft) c.	1847			carries West Coast Main Line over the River Lune	
Carnon viaduct	Perranwell, Cornwall	England					Carries the Truro to Falmouth line over the Carnon River valley	
Causey Arch	Stanley, County Durham	England	31 m (102 ft)	1726	Stone arch	I	Oldest surviving single-arch railway bridge in the world, Crosses the Causey Burn.	
Cartuther Viaduct	Liskeard, Cornwall	England					Replaced 1882	
Carvedras Viaduct	Truro, Cornwall	England		1904				
Castlefield Viaducts	Manchester	England						
Castor Bridge	Wansford and Castor	England					Girder Bridge carrying the preserved Nene Valley Railway across the River Nene	
Cefn/Newbridge Viaduct	River Dee, Cefn Mawr, Wrexham	Wales						
Cefn Coed Viaduct	Cefn-coed-y-cymmer, Wales	Wales						
Chacewater Viaduct	Chacewater, Cornwall	England						
Chalfont Viaduct	Gerrards Cross, Buckinghamshire	England	104 m (341 ft)	1906	Brick arch		Carries the Chiltern Main Line over the M25 Motorway	
Chappel Viaduct	Chappel, Essex	England	320 m (1,050 ft)	1849	Brick arch	II	Carries the Gainsborough Line across the Colne Valley	
Charlton Viaduct	Shepton Mallet, Somerset	England	250 m (820 ft) c.	1874	Stone arch	II*	Carried Somerset and Dorset Joint Railway across the Sheppey valley	
Chelfham Viaduct	Chelfham	England	120 m (390 ft)	1897	Brick arch	II	Lynton and Barnstaple Railway, Devon	
Chelmsford Viaduct	Chelmsford, Essex	England		1842	Brick arch		carries Great Eastern Main Line over Central park	
Chepstow Railway Bridge	Tidenham, Gloucestershire	England		1852	Truss bridge	II	Brunel's first lenticular truss. Crosses the River Wye	
Chester Burn viaduct	Chester-le-Street, County Durham	England	230 m (750 ft)	1868	Stone arch	II	It carries the East Coast Main Line over Chester Burn	
Chesterfield Viaduct	Chesterfield, Derbyshire	England					better known as Horns Bridge	
Chirk Viaduct	near Chirk, Wales	Wales			Stone arch		Carries railway across the Ceiriog Valley	
Clifton Viaduct	Clifton, near Manchester	England		1846	Stone arch	II	Carried Manchester, Bury and Rossendale Railway across the Irwell valley	
Clinnick Viaduct	near Bodmin Parkway, Cornwall	England	100 m (330 ft)	1879	Stone arch	II		
Coat of Arms Bridge	Coventry	England		1844	Stone arch	II	carried the London and Birmingham Railway over Bridge Road	
Cogload Junction Flyover	Durston, Somerset	England		1931				
Coldrennick Viaduct	Menheniot, Cornwall	England						
Collegewood Viaduct	Penryn, Cornwall	England	291 m (955 ft)				Replaced in 1934. Piers remain	
Colne Valley Viaduct	Buckinghamshire	England	3,400 m (11,200 ft)	2024	Concrete		Currently under construction, will carry High Speed 2 across the Colne Valley Regional Park	
Colonnade Viaduct	Dawlish, Devon	England						
Congleton Viaduct	North Rode, Cheshire	England				II	carries the Stoke-on-Trent to Manchester railway over the River Dane	
Conisbrough Viaduct	Conisbrough, South Yorkshire	England					now carries a branch of the trans-pennine trail 38 yd (34 m) high over the River Don	
Conwy Railway Bridge	Conwy, Wales	Wales	141 m (463 ft)	1849			Carries the North Wales Coast Line across the River Conwy	
Coombe by Saltash Viaduct	Saltash, Cornwall	England	184 m (604 ft)				Replaced 1894	
Coombe by St Stephens Viaduct	near St Austell, Cornwall	England						
Corby Bridge (or Wetheral Viaduct)	Wetheral, Cumbria	England	280 m (920 ft)	1834	Stone arch	I	Carries the Tyne Valley Line over the River Eden	
Corby Viaduct	Great Corby, Cumbria	England	160 m (520 ft)	1834	Stone Arch	II	Crosses Corby Beck	
Corfe Railway Viaduct	Corfe Castle, Dorset	England					carries the Swanage Railway between Corfe Castle and Nordon	
Cox Viaduct	Goonhavern, Cornwall	England					(disused)	
Craigavon Bridge	Craigavon, County Londonderry	Northern Ireland		1933			double deck, lower deck former goods line	
Craigmore Viaduct	Bessbrook, County Armagh	Northern Ireland	350 m (1,150 ft) c.	1852	Stone arch	Grade A	18 arch viaduct carrying the Dublin-Belfast railway line over the Camlough valley	
Crawfordsburn Viaduct	Crawfordsburn, County Down	Northern Ireland	100 m (330 ft)	1865	Stone Arch		Five arches and cast-iron lattice parapets carrying Belfast–Bangor line across Crawfordsburn Glen	
Crimple Valley Viaduct	Harrogate, North Yorkshire	England	572 m (1,877 ft)	1848	Stone arch	II*	Built for the York and North Midland Railway	
Crosskeys Bridge	Sutton Bridge, Lincolnshire	England		1897	Swing bridge	II*	Once carried the Midland and Great Northern Joint Railway line over the River Nene	
Crumlin Viaduct	Crumlin, Caerphilly, Ebbw Valley, Wales	Wales	260 m (850 ft)	1857	Iron truss		The least expensive bridge for its size ever constructed; the highest railway viaduct in the United Kingdom; the third highest viaduct in the world. Closed 1967	
Crumlin Viaduct (Northern Ireland)	Crumlin, County Antrim	Northern Ireland		1915	Pratt Truss		Mothballed	
Cullen Viaduct	Seatown, Cullen, Moray	Scotland		1886	Stone arch	Cat. B	Carried Great North of Scotland Railway over the Burn of Cullen. Closed 1968. Now a footbridge.	
Culloden Viaduct	near Inverness, Scotland	Scotland	549 m (1,801 ft)	1898	Stone arch	Cat. A	Carries Highland Main Line across the valley of the River Nairn	
Cwm Du Viaduct	Pont Rhyd-y-Cyff, Bridgend	Wales		1897	Brick arch		Carried Port Talbot Railway over Cwm Du. Closed 1960	
Cwm Prysor Viaduct	Cwm Prysor, Gwynedd	Wales	150 m (490 ft)	1882	Stone and Brick arch	II	Carried Bala & Festiniog Railway across Cwm Prysor. Closed 1961 and now a footbridge.	
Cynghordy Viaduct	Cynghordy, Carmarthenshire	Wales	259 m (850 ft)	1868	Stone and Brick arch	II*	Carries Heart of Wales Line.	
Daisyfield Viaduct	Bury, Lancashire	England					Rail traffic ended in the 1970s and is now used for recreation since 1999.	
Dalmarnock Bridge	Rutherglen, Glasgow	Scotland		1897	Arch			
Dandry Mire/Moorcock Viaduct	Garsdale, Cumbria	England	208 m (682 ft)				15.3 m (50 ft) high with 12 spans.	
Darcy Lever viaduct	Darcy Lever, Bolton	England	188 m (617 ft)	1848	Lattice girder		28 m (92 ft) high with 8 spans. Now a footbridge	
Dargan Bridge	Belfast	Northern Ireland		1990s			Crosses the River Lagan	
Denby Dale Viaduct	Denby Dale, Huddersfield	England	335 m (1,099 ft)	1880, replacing a wooden structure of 1850	stone arch	II	38 m (125 ft) high with 21 arches; it was built by the Huddersfield and Sheffield Junction Railway, taken over by the L & Y. Crosses the Dearne valley.	
Dent Head Viaduct	Stone House, Cumbria	England	182 m (597 ft)	1875			30.5 m (100 ft) high with 10 spans.	
Derrycombe Viaduct	Bodmin Parkway, Cornwall	England	112 m (367 ft)	1881	Stone arch	II	23m high	
Dinting Viaduct	Glossopdale, Derbyshire	England	370 m (1,210 ft)	1844			Carries the Glossop Line over a valley. 36m high	
Doe Lea Viaduct	Carr Vale, Derbyshire	England	110 m (360 ft)	1897	Brick arch		Carried LD&ECR's Chesterfield to Lincoln main line over the Midland Railway's Pleasley to Staveley Doe Lea Branch. Demolished 1952	
Dolgoch Viaduct	Between Tywyn and Abergynolwyn, Gwynedd, Wales	Wales		1866	Brick arch	II	16m high. Carries the 2 ft 3 in (686 mm) gauge Talyllyn Railway over the Dolgoch Ravine.	
Dollis Brook Viaduct	Finchley, London	England		1867	Stone arch		18m high. Carries London Underground's Northern line.	
Dowery Dell Viaduct	Hunnington, Worcestershire	England			Lattice girder on trestles		Carried the Halesowen to Longbridge railway. Dismantled in 1964	
Draw Wood Viaduct	Bodmin Parkway, Cornwall	England	208 m (682 ft)				13m high. Replaced by retaining walls in 1875.	
Dromore Viaduct	Dromore, County Down	Northern Ireland			Stone arch		Abandoned 7 arch viaduct over the River Lagan	
Dunkerton Viaduct	Dunkerton, Somerset	England	70 m (230 ft)		Stone arch		Carried the Camerton to Limpley Stoke railway over the village. Demolished 1981.	
Durham Viaduct	Durham	England	240 m (790 ft)	1857		II*	30 metres high with eleven arches	
Dutton Viaduct	River Weaver, Cheshire	England	457 m (1,499 ft)	1837		II*	18m high with 20 spans	
East Norton Viaduct	East Norton, Leicestershire	England	190 m (620 ft)	1870s			Demolished 2001	
Fal Viaduct	Truro, Cornwall	England					Crosses the River Fal	
Filleigh Viaduct	Filleigh, Devon	England					Former GWR line from Barnstaple to Taunton. Pillars reused for A361 road bridge near Barnstaple, North Devon	
Fledborough Viaduct	North Clifton, Nottinghamshire	England					Crosses the River Trent	
Fiddich Viaduct	Dufftown, Scotland	Scotland					Carries the preserved Keith and Dufftown Railway across the River Fidditch	
Folkestone Foord Rd Viaduct	Folkestone, Kent	England		1844	Brick arch	II	Built by Sir William Cubitt	
Forder Viaduct	Saltash, Cornwall	England	185 m (607 ft)				Demolished 1908	
Forth Bridge	near Edinburgh, Scotland	Scotland	2,528 m (8,294 ft)	1890	Cantilever	Cat. A	Crosses the Firth of Forth	
Fowey Viaduct	Fowey, Cornwall	England			Stone arch		Carries the heritage Bodmin & Wenford Railway across the River Fowey	
Friargate Bridge	Derby	England		1878		II	a.k.a. Handyside Bridge; (cf. Handyside Bridge a.k.a. Derwent Bridge, on the same line)	
Fulham Railway Bridge	Fulham, London	England		1889	Lattice girder		Carries London Underground's District line across the River Thames	
Galgate Viaduct	Galgate, Lancashire	England		1840	Stone arch		Carries West Coast Main Line from Preston to Lancaster over River Conder	
Garndiffaith Viaduct	Garndiffaith, Torfaen	Wales		1874	Stone arch	II	Carried the former Brynmawr and Blaenavon Railway over the valley of the Avon Ffrwd	
Garnock Viaduct	north of Kilwinning, North Ayrshire	Scotland		1888	Stone arch			
Gasworks Bridge	Oxford	England					now a footbridge across the River Thames	
Gaunless Bridge	West Auckland, County Durham	England	20 m (66 ft)	1823	Truss		first lenticular truss bridge and first iron bridge to carry a railway. Dismantled 1901	
Gaunless Viaduct	West Auckland, County Durham	England					Demolished. One pier remaining	
Gatehampton Railway Bridge	Goring, Oxfordshire	England		1838	Brick arch		Carries the Great Western Main Line over the River Thames	
Gilderdale Viaduct	Lambley, Northumberland	England		1852	Stone arch	II	Carries the narrow gauge South Tynedale Railway over Gilderdale burn	
Giltbrook Viaduct	Giltbrook, Nottinghamshire	England					(demolished)	
Glaze Viaduct	near Ivybridge, Devon	England						
Glenfinnan Viaduct	Lochaber, Scotland	Scotland					on the West Highland Line	
Glenury Viaduct	Stonehaven, Scotland	Scotland		1849		B	Carries the Dundee–Aberdeen line	
Goathland Viaduct (a.k.a. Thomason Foss Viaduct)	between Goathland and Grosmont, North Yorkshire	England					carries the heritage North Yorkshire Moors Railway across the Murk Esk	
Goetre Coed Viaduct	Edwardsville, Merthyr Tydfil	Wales					on the Taff Vale Railway	
Goldielea Viaduct	Dumfries and Galloway, Scotland	Scotland					(disused)	
Goonbell Viaduct	Goonbell, Cornwall	England	130 m (430 ft)	c. 1900	Stone and concrete arch		(disused)	
Gover Viaduct	St Austell, Cornwall	England				II		
Goyt Viaduct a.k.a. Strines Viaduct	Strines, Stockport	England		1865	Stone arch and girder	II	Spans the River Goyt	
Great Musgrave Bridge	Great Musgrave, Cumbria	England		1862			Infilled with 1500 tons of concrete in July 2021 by National Highways	
Gree Viaduct	North-East Ayrshire, Scotland	Scotland					on the former Lanarkshire and Ayrshire Railway. Demolished 2007	
Grimstone Viaduct	Grimstone, Dorset	England					Carries Castle Cary-Weymouth line over Sydling Water	
Grosvenor Bridge	near Victoria railway station, London	England		1860; widened 1865 and 1907; rebuilt 1963–1967			Carries lines to Victoria station over the River Thames	
Guildford Viaduct	Hayle, Cornwall	England						
Ham Green Viaduct	Bickleigh, Devon	England					now part of the Plym Valley Cycle Track	
Handyside Bridge a.k.a. Derwent Bridge	Derby	England	62 m (203 ft)	1878	tied arch	II	cf. Friargate Bridge, Derby a.k.a. Handyside Bridge	
Hawarden Bridge	Shotton, Flintshire	Wales		1889	Swing bridge		Carries the Borderlands Line across the River Dee	
Hayle Viaduct	Hayle, Cornwall	England					Crosses the estuary of the River Hayle	
Headfield Viaduct	Dewsbury, West Yorkshire	England		1887	Stone arch and bowstring		Crossed the River Calder and Calder and Hebble Navigation. Closed 1990 and converted to cycle path.	
Headstone Viaduct	Monsal Dale, Derbyshire	England	91 m (299 ft)	1863			Carried Peak Railway Line over the River Wye	
Healey Dell Viaduct	Rochdale, Greater Manchester	England		1867	Stone arch		Carried the Rochdale to Bacup Line over the River Spodden	
Helmshore Viaduct	Helmshore, Lancashire	England		1848	Stone arch		spans the River Ogden	
Hengoed Viaduct	Maesycwmmer, Caephilly	Wales	260 m (850 ft)	1854	Stone arch	II	Carried the Taff Vale Extension of the Newport, Abergavenny and Hereford Railway across the Rhymney River	
Hereford Road Skew Bridge	Ledbury, Herefordshire	England		1885	Ribbed skew arch		Carried Great Western Railway over Hereford Road. Now a footpath.	
Hewenden Viaduct	Cullingworth, West Yorkshire	England	527 m (1,729 ft)	1883	Stone arch	II	Carried the Great Northern Railway across the Hewenden Valley	
High Level Bridge	Newcastle upon Tyne and Gateshead, Tyne & Wear	England	408 m (1,339 ft)	1849	bow-string girder	I	on the East Coast Main Line across the River Tyne	
Hitchin Flyover	Hitchin, Hertfordshire	England		2013			on the Great Northern Route	
Hookhills Viaduct	Churston, Devon	England	135 m (443 ft)		Stone arch		carries the preserved Dartmouth Steam Railway	
Hockley Railway Viaduct	Winchester, Hampshire	England	614 m (2,014 ft)	1891	brick clad concrete arch		disused viaduct	
Horns Bridge (a.k.a. Chesterfield Viaduct)	Chesterfield, Derbyshire	England		1897	Brick arch			
Hownsgill Viaduct	Healeyfield, County Durham	England	210 m (690 ft)	1858	Brick arch	II*	Carried the Stockton and Darlington Railway across Howns Gill. Closed 1969.	
Hungerford Bridge	near Charing Cross railway station, London	England		1864	Steel truss			
Imberhorne Viaduct	East Grinstead, West Sussex	England	210 m (690 ft)	1882	Brick arch	II	now carries the Bluebell Railway across Imberhorne Farm	
Ingleton Viaduct	Ingleton, North Yorkshire	England	240 m (790 ft)	1860	Stone arch	II	Crosses the River Greta. Closed 1965	
Irlam Viaduct	Irlam, Manchester	England	37 m (121 ft)	1893	Lattice girder		Carries Manchester-Liverpool Line over the Manchester Ship Canal	
John o'Gaunt Viaduct	Twyford, Leicestershire	England	210 m (690 ft)	c. 1879	Brick arch		Great Northern Railway and London & North Western Railway Joint Line	
Keekle Viaduct	River Keekle, Cumbria	England		1879	Brick arch		Carried the Cleator and Workington Junction Railway across the valley of the River Keekle	
Kendrum Viaduct	Kendrum Burn, Stirling	Scotland			Concrete and steel arch		Carried railway over Kendrum Burn. Now cycle path.	
Kennington Railway Bridge	Kennington, Oxfordshire	England		1923	Steel through arch		Carries branch line across the River Thames	
Kew Railway Bridge	Kew, London	England	175 m (574 ft)	1869	Wrought iron lattice girder	II	Carries GWR extension (now London Overground) and London Underground's District line across the River Thames	
Keyham Viaduct	Plymouth, Devon	England	132 m (433 ft)	1900	Steel girder		Great Western Railway	
Kielder Viaduct	Kielder, Northumberland	England	119 m (390 ft)	1862	Stone arch		Carried Border Counties line over marsh. No longer used for rail traffic	
King Edward VII Bridge	Tyne and Wear, Newcastle upon Tyne and Gateshead	England	350 m (1,150 ft)	1906	Steel lattice	II	Crosses the River Tyne	
King George V Bridge	Keadby, Lincolnshire	England		1916	Bascule bridge		Carries rail and road across the River Trent. Bridge no longer opens	
King's Mill Viaduct	Mansfield, Nottinghamshire	England		1817	Stone Arch	II	Carried Mansfield and Pinxton Railway over the River Maun. Now a public footpath.	
Kingsland Viaduct	London Borough of Hackney	England	3,000 m (9,800 ft)	1860s				
Kingston Railway Bridge	Kingston upon Thames, London	England	35 m (115 ft)	1863	Steel arch		Carries the Kingston Loop Line across the River Thames	
Kirkstall Road Viaduct	Leeds, West Yorkshire	England		1846	Stone arch		Carries the Harrogate Line across both river and road	
Knaresborough Viaduct	Knaresborough, North Yorkshire	England	80 m (260 ft)	1851	Stone Arch		Carries the Harrogate Line across the River Nidd	
Knucklas Viaduct	Knucklas, Powys	Wales		1865	Stone arch		Carried Central Wales Railway over the River Teme	
Lady Wimborne Bridge	Wimborne, Dorset	England		1876	Stone arch	II	Crossed the main drive to Canford House	
Lagan Viaduct	Belfast, County Down	Northern Ireland		1976			Crosses the River Lagan	
Laira Bridge	Plymouth, Devon	England		1887			Crosses the River Plym. Now disused.	
Lambley Viaduct	Northumberland	England	260 m (850 ft)	1852	Stone arch	II*	Carried the former Haltwhistle to Alston Branch Line across the valley of the South Tyne River	
Landore viaduct	Landore, Swansea	Wales		c. 1850			Crosses the Swansea Valley and the River Tawe	
Langport viaduct	Langport, Somerset	England			Stone arch		Carries London-Penzance line over the River Parrett	
Largin Viaduct	Bodmin Parkway, Cornwall	England	173 m (568 ft)	1886		II	Crosses the Fowey Valley	
Larkhall Viaduct	Larkhall, South Lanarkshire	England	236 m (774 ft)	1904	Iron girder	Cat. B	Crosses the River Avon. The tallest viaduct in Scotland at 175 feet	
Larpool Viaduct	North Yorkshire	England	279 m (915 ft)	1885 c.	Brick arch	II	Carried the Scarborough and Whitby Railway over the River Esk. Since services ended in 1965, it has become part of a walking and cycling route	
Leaderfoot Viaduct	Melrose, Scottish Borders	Scotland		1863	Stone and brick arch	Cat. A	Carried Berwickshire Railway over the River Tweed	
Lintley Viaduct	Slaggyford, Northumberland	England			Stone arch		will carry the Narrow Gauge South Tynedale Railway across and into Slaggyford from 2016–17.	
Lipwood Railway Bridge	Lipwood, Northumberland	England		1866	Iron girder		carries the railway between Newcastle upon Tyne and Carlisle across the River South Tyne.	
Llandeilo Railway Bridge	Llandeilo	Wales			Lattice girder truss		Crosses the River Tywi	
Lobb Ghyll Viaduct	between Addingham and Bolton Abbey, North Yorkshire	England			Stone arch		could one day carry the Embsay and Bolton Abbey Steam Railway across the nearby River Wharfe	
Lockwood Viaduct	Lockwood, Huddersfield	England	340 m (1,120 ft)	1850	Stone arch	II	Built by the Huddersfield and Sheffield Junction Railway, taken over by the L & Y. Crosses the Holme valley. 41m high, with 32 arches	
Logierait Bridge	Logierait, Atholl	Scotland			Iron lattice		Crosses the River Tay	
London Bridge – Greenwich Railway Viaduct	Greenwich, London	England	5,550 m (18,210 ft)	1836	Brick arch	II	Carries elevated railway	
London Road viaduct	Brighton	England		1840s	Brick arch	II*	Carries elevated railway	
Longwood Viaduct	near Kingswear, Devon	England					Paignton and Dartmouth Steam Railway. Now demolished.	
Loughor railway viaduct	Near Loughor, Swansea, Wales	Wales		2013			Carries West Wales Line across the River Loughor estuary. Rebuilt in 2013	
Lower Lydbrook Viaduct	Lower Lydbrook, Gloucestershire	England		1872	Iron girder		Carried Severn and Wye Railway over the Lydbrook Valley. Demolished 1966	
Lowgill Viaduct	Cumbria	England	189 m (620 ft)	1859	Brick arch	II		
Lumb Viaduct	Rossendale Valley, Lancashire	England		1848	Stone arch	II	Crosses the River Irwell	
Lune Viaduct	Sedbergh, Cumbria	England		1861	Sandstone arch and cast-iron girder	II*	Carried the Ingleton branch line over the River Lune. Closed 1965.	
Lyne Bridge	Chertsey, Surrey	England	110 m (360 ft)	1979	Cable-stayed		Crosses M25 motorway	
MacNeill's Egyptian Arch	Newry, Northern Ireland	Northern Ireland		1851		Grade B+	Carries the Dublin–Belfast railway line over the Newry-Camlough Road	
Magpie Viaduct	Horrabridge, Devon	England					(disused)	
Maidenhead Railway Bridge	Maidenhead, Berkshire	England	80 m (260 ft)	1839	Brick arch	I	Carries Great Western Railway over the River Thames	
Mansfield Railway Viaduct	Mansfield, Nottinghamshire	England		1876			Carries East Midlands Railway	
Markland Grips Viaduct	Clowne, Derbyshire	England		1896			Carried Lancashire, Derbyshire and East Coast Railway over Markland Grips gorge. Buried under spoil to form embankment	
Marple Viaduct	Marple, Stockport	England	282 m (925 ft)	1865			Spans the River Goyt	
Martholme Viaduct	Great Harwood, Lancashire	England		1877			Spans the River Calder (disused)	
Medway Viaducts	Rochester, Kent	England	1,300 m (4,300 ft)	2002	Cantilever		Carries two track High Speed 1 over the River Medway	
Meldon Viaduct	Okehampton, Devon	England	165 m (541 ft)	1874	Iron truss		Carried Dartmoor Railway over the West Okement River. Closed 1990.	
Midford Viaduct	nr Bath	England		1908	Brick arch		formerly Somerset and Dorset Railway, (disused)	
Midland Counties Viaduct	Rugby, Warwickshire	England	210 m (690 ft)	1840	Brick arch	II	carried the Midland Counties Railway over the A426 Rugby to Leicester road and the River Avon	
Milltown Viaduct	Lostwithiel, Cornwall	England	153 m (502 ft)	1894	Stone arch			
Milton Viaduct	Gatehead, Ayrshire	Scotland	82 m (269 ft)	1812	Stone arch		the oldest surviving railway bridge in the World. Kilmarnock & Troon Railway	
Milton Regis Viaduct	Milton Regis, Kent	England	750 m (2,460 ft) c.	1915			carries the Sittingbourne and Kemsley Light Railway	
Monkwearmouth Railway Bridge	Sunderland, Tyne and Wear	England		1879	Vierendeel truss bowstring arch	II	Crosses the River Wear	
Monmouth Viaduct a.k.a. Chippenham Meadow Viaduct	Monmouth, Wales	Wales	183 m (600 ft)	1861			Carried the Coleford, Monmouth, Usk & Pontypool Railway across the River Wye	
Moorswater Viaduct	Liskeard, Cornwall	England	291 m (955 ft)	1881	Stone arch	II*	Crosses the Liskeard and Looe Railway	
Moulsford Railway Bridge	Moulsford, Oxfordshire	England		1839	Brick arch	II*	Carries Great Western Main Line across the River Thames	
Mytholmes Viaduct	between Haworth and Oakworth, West Yorkshire	England					carries the Keighley and Worth Valley Railway across the River Worth.	
Naburn Railway Bridge	York	England		1871	Swing bridge		Carried York-Selby railway over the River Ouse. Now a footbridge and cycleway.	
Neidpath Viaduct a.k.a. Queen's Bridge	near Neidpath Castle, Scottish Borders	Scotland		1864	Sandstone arch		Carried Caledonian Railway over the River Tweed. Now a footbridge.	
Nene Viaduct	Peterborough	England		1850	Cast iron arch	II*	Carries two of the four tracks of the East Coast Main Line across the River Nene. The other two tracks are carried by a separate steel truss bridge.	
Newbattle Viaduct	Newtongrange, Midlothian	Scotland		1847	Stone arch		Carries the Borders Railway over the River South Esk	
Nine Elms to Waterloo Viaduct	from Nine Elms to Waterloo station	England	3,200 m (10,500 ft)	1848	Brick		Carries all lines out of Waterloo, and includes Vauxhall station. Has over 290 arches.	
Ninety–Nine Arches Viaduct	Wakefield, West Yorkshire	England		1866	Stone arches		Carries the Wakefield Line	
Noss Viaduct	near Kingswear	England		1847			Paignton and Dartmouth Steam Railway. Devon (demolished)	
Notter Viaduct	St Germans, Cornwall	England				II		
Nuneham Railway Bridge	nr Abingdon, Oxfordshire	England		1929			Carries Cherwell Valley Line across the River Thames	
Oaks Viaduct	Dearne Valley, South Yorkshire	England		1869	Trestle		Carried Midland Railway Cudworth-Barnsley branch across the Dearne Valley. Now (demolished)	
Oldbury Viaduct (a.k.a. Daniel's Bridge)	between Bridgnorth and Eardington, Shropshire	England					Carries the preserved Severn Valley Railway across the River Severn	
Orbiston Viaduct	North Motherwell, North Lanarkshire	Scotland		1849			Also known as the Bellshill Viaduct. Carries the West Coast Main Line over the South Calder Water.	
Osney Rail Bridge	Oxford	England		1887	Iron girder		Carries the Cherwell Valley Line across the River Thames	
Ouseburn Viaduct	Newcastle-upon-Tyne	England	280 m (920 ft)	1839	Iron arch	II*	Carries East Coast Main Line over Ouseburn Valley	
Outwood Viaduct	Radcliffe, Greater Manchester	England	100 m (330 ft)	1846	Cast iron arch	II	Crosses the River Irwell. Now a footpath	
Oykel Railway Viaduct	Invershin, Scottish Highlands	Scotland	70 m (230 ft)	1868	Lattice girder	Cat A	Carries the Far North Line across the Kyle of Sutherland	
Paddock Viaduct	Huddersfield	England				II		
Par Viaduct	Par, Cornwall	England			Stone arch		Carried the line over a tramway, river and canal near Par Harbour	
Park Square Bridge a.k.a. Supertram Bridge	Sheffield, South Yorkshire	England		1993	Tied arch		tramway	
Parkhead Viaduct	Dudley, West Midlands	England		1880	Stone arch		disused	
Pascoe Viaduct	Penryn, Cornwall	England	120 m (390 ft)				demolished and replaced by embankment	
Penadlake Viaduct	near Bodmin Parkway, Cornwall	England	130 m (430 ft)	1877	Stone arch	II		
Penallt Viaduct	Penallt, Monmouthshire	Wales	100 m (330 ft)	1876	Iron girder		Carried the Wye Valley Railway over the River Wye. Now a footpath.	
Penistone Viaduct	Penistone, South Yorkshire	England	300 m (980 ft)	1850	Stone arch	I	30 m (98 ft) high; 29 Arches; it was originally part of the Lancashire & Yorkshire Railway, now served by Northern Trains. Partial collapse in 1916.	
Penkridge Viaduct	near Penkridge, Staffordshire	England		1837	Stone arch	II	Carries West Coast Main Line over the River Penk	
Pennycomequick Viaduct a.k.a. Plymouth Loop Viaduct	Plymouth	England			Stone arch			
Penponds Viaduct	near Redruth, Cornwall	England	103 m (338 ft)	1888	Brick arch		Carries Cornish Main Line over the Red River	
Penryn Viaduct	Penryn, Cornwall	England	104 m (341 ft)				demolished and replaced by embankment	
Pensford Viaduct	Pensford, Somerset	England	303 m (994 ft)	1874	Stone arch	II	Carried Bristol and North Somerset Railway over the River Chew. Now disused	
Penwithers Viaduct	Truro, Cornwall	England					Carried West Cornwall Railway. Demolished and replaced by embankment	
Penzance Viaduct	Penzance, Cornwall	England					(demolished)	
Perran Viaduct	Perranwell, Cornwall	England	103 m (338 ft)	1927	Stone			
Pontsmill Viaduct	near Luxulyan, Cornwall	England						
Pont Briwet	Penrhyndeudraeth, Gwynedd	Wales		2014	Concrete		Crosses the River Dwyryd	
Pont-y-Cafnau	Merthyr Tydfil, Wales	Wales	14 m (46 ft)	1793	Iron		First iron bridge to carry a plateway. Crosses the River Taff	
Porthkerry Viaduct	Barry, Vale of Glamorgan	Wales			Brick arch	II	Carries rail traffic between Barry and Bridgend	
Probus Viaduct	near Truro, Cornwall	England	133 m (436 ft)				Demolished and replaced by embankment	
Queen Alexandra Bridge	Sunderland, Tyne & Wear	England	274 m (899 ft)	1909	Steel truss	II	Carried the North Eastern Railway over the River Wear	
Queen Elizabeth II Metro Bridge	Newcastle-upon-Tyne and Gateshead, Northumberland	England	360 m (1,180 ft)	1978	Steel truss		Carries the Tyne and Wear Metro over the River Tyne	
Quoile Bridge	Downpatrick, County Down	Northern Ireland	43 m (141 ft)	1999			Carries the Belfast and County Down Railway over the River Quoile	
Reading Flyover	west of Reading railway station, Berkshire	England	1.25 miles (2.01 km)	2015	Concrete pier and beam		Carries the fast tracks of the Great Western Main Line allowing freight trains to cross the fast tracks without interrupting express passenger trains.	
Rectory Junction Viaduct a.k.a. Radcliffe Viaduct	Radcliffe-on-Trent, Nottinghamshire	England				II	Crosses the River Trent	
Redruth Viaduct	Redruth, Cornwall	England						
Reedham Swing Bridge	Reedham, Norfolk	England		1840s			Carries Wherry railway line across the River Yare	
Rewley Road Swing Bridge	Oxford	England		1851	Swing Bridge	Scheduled monument	Carried railway over Sheepwash Channel. Replaced by new bridge	
Richmond Railway Bridge	Richmond, London	England	91.5 m (300 ft)		Steel Truss arch	II	Carries the Waterloo to Reading Line over the River Thames	
Ribblehead Viaduct a.k.a. Batty Moss Viaduct	Ribblehead, North Yorkshire	England	400 m (1,300 ft)	1875	Stone arch	II	Carries Settle-Carlisle Railway across Batty Moss	
Ridley Railway Bridge	near Ridley Hall, Northumberland	England		1907	Cast iron girder		Crosses the River South Tyne	
Ringwell Viaduct	Perranwell, Cornwall	England	112 m (367 ft)				Demolished and replaced by embankment	
Rispin Cleugh Viaduct		Scotland					on the Leadhills and Wanlockhead Branch of the Caledonian Railway. Demolished 1990	
River Irwell Railway bridge	Manchester	England	20 m (66 ft)	1830	Stone arch	I	By George Stephenson. Crosses the River Irwell	
Riverford Viaduct	Bickleigh, Devon	England	120 m (390 ft)	1893	Stone arch		Disused	
Roch Valley Viaduct	Rochdale, Greater Manchester	England					Carried the Rochdale to Bacup Line. Demolished 1972	
Rochester Bridge	Rochester, Medway	England		1892			Built by SER over the River Medway, now used by Chatham Main Line and North Kent Line services	
Rockmill Viaduct	near Luxulyan, Cornwall	England			Wrought Iron		Crosses the River Par	
Twemlow Viaduct	near Holmes Chapel, Cheshire	England	520 m (1,710 ft)	1841	red brick and sandstone	II	Crosses the River Dane	
Romanby Viaduct	between Ainderby and Northallerton, North Yorkshire	England					Carries the Heritage Wensleydale Railway across the River Wiske	
Rowsley Viaduct	Rowsley, Derbyshire	England		1862	Stone arch		could one day carry the Peak Rail) heritage railway across both the nearby road and the River Derwent	
Royal Albert Bridge	Plymouth and Saltash	England	666 m (2,185 ft)	1859	Lenticular truss	I	Carries the Cornish Main Line across the River Tamar	
Royal Border Bridge	Berwick upon Tweed, north Northumberland	England	659 m (2,162 ft)	1850	Brick/stone arch	I	on the East Coast Main Line across the River Tweed	
Runcorn Gap viaduct	Runcorn, Cheshire	England		1858			provides approaches to Runcorn Bridge either side of the River Mersey	
Runcorn Railway Bridge	Runcorn, Cheshire	England	330 m (1,080 ft)	1858	double-web lattice girder	II	Carries the Liverpool branch of the West Coast Main Line across the River Mersey	
St Austell Viaduct a.k.a. Trenance Viaduct	St Austell, Cornwall	England	220 m (720 ft)	1899	Stone arch		Crosses the Trenance Valley	
St Germans Viaduct	St Germans, Cornwall	England	288 m (945 ft)	1908	Stone arch	II	Crosses the River Tiddy	
St James's Bridge	Bath, Somerset	England	27 m (89 ft)	c. 1840	Stone arch	II	Carries Great Western Main Line across the River Avon west into Bath Spa station. Built by Brunel.	
St James' Viaduct	Bath, Somerset	England		1840	Stone arches, steel girders over roads.	II*	Carries Great Western Main Line from the Skew Bridge west towards Bristol. Built by Brunel.	
St. Julian's railway bridge	Newport, Wales	Wales		1874	wrought iron lattice truss		Crosses the River Usk	
St Pinnock Viaduct	near Bodmin Parkway, Cornwall	England		1882		II		
St Thomas Viaduct	Exeter, Devon	England			wrought iron lattice truss			
Saltburn Viaduct	Saltburn-by-the-Sea, Redcar and Cleveland	England		1872	Brick arch	II	Carries the Boulby line (now a mineral branch terminating at Boulby Mine) over Skelton Beck	
Sankey Viaduct	near Earlestown, Merseyside	England		1830	Stone arch	I	Crosses the Sankey Canal and Sankey Brook	
Scarborough Bridge	York	England		2015			Carries North TransPennine Scarborough Branch across the River Ouse	
Scotswood Railway Bridge	Newcastle-upon-Tyne and Gateshead, Tyne and Wear	England	212 m (696 ft)	1871	Hogback bridge		Crosses the River Tyne but now disused.	
Severn Railway Bridge	Lydney, Gloucestershire	England	1,269 m (4,163 ft)	1879			Crossed the River Severn. Demolished 1970	
Shankend Viaduct	Scottish Borders	Scotland		1862	Stone arch	Category B	Carried the Waverley Line over the Langside valley. Now disused.	
Sheepwash Channel Railway Bridge	Oxford	England			Girder bridge		Carries railway over Sheepwash Channel	
Sheffield District Railway Bridge, Brightside	Sheffield	England			Lattice girder		Crosses the River Don	
Shepton Mallet Viaduct	Shepton Mallet, Somerset	England		1874	Stone arch		Carried the Somerset and Dorset Joint Railway across the River Sheppey valley. Now disused	
Shillamill Viaduct	Tavistock, Devon	England		1889		II		
Shiplake Railway Bridge	Henley-on-Thames, Berkshire	England		1897	Girder		Carries the Henley Branch Line across the River Thames	
Six Arches, Ackworth	Ackworth, West Yorkshire	England			Stone arch		Carries Pontefract to Rotherham line over the River Went	
Skerne Bridge	Darlington, County Durham	England		1825	Stone arch	I	Crosses the River Skerne. Carried the first train on the opening of the Stockton and Darlington Railway, and is the oldest railway bridge in continuous use in the world	
Skew Bridge, Bath	Bath, Somerset	England	48.76 m (160.0 ft)	1840; rebuilt 1878	Wrought iron truss	II	Carries Great Western Main Line west from Bath Spa station across the River Avon. Originally built by Brunel with laminated timber arches.	
Slade Viaduct	near Ivybridge, Devon	England			Stone arch		Crosses Piall valley	
Smardale Viaduct	Crosby Garrett, Cumbria	England	220 m (720 ft)	1875	Stone arch		Crosses Scandal Beck and the former Stainmore railway line.	
Smardalegill Viaduct	Crosby Garrett, Cumbria	England	167 m (548 ft) c.	1861	Stone arch	II*	Now a footpath	
Smugglers Lane Viaduct	near Teignmouth, Devon	England			Stone arch			
Solway Viaduct	Bowness-on-Solway, Cumbria, to Annan, Dumfries and Galloway	Scotland	2,161 m (7,090 ft)	1869	Viaduct: cast iron columns and wrought iron trestle		Carried the Solway Junction Railway over the Solway Firth. Rebuilt 1882–4, closed 1921, dismantled 1935	
Somerleyton Swing Bridge	Somerleyton, Norfolk	England		1905	Swing bridge			
Somerset Bridge	Bridgwater, Somerset	England		1904	Steel Girder		Carries Bristol to Taunton line over the River Parrett	
Somerton Viaduct	near Somerton, Somerset	England		1906			Carries Langport and Castle Cary Railway over the River Cary	
South Tyne Viaduct		England					on the Narrow Gauge South Tynedale Railway, Cumbria/Northumberland.	
Southdown Road Skew Bridge	Harpenden, Hertfordshire	England		1868	Ribbed skew brick arch		carries Midland Main Line across Southdown Road	
Southern Railway Viaduct	Salford	England		1844	Cast-iron	II*	Carries railway lines over New Bailey Street	
Staines Railway Bridge	Staines-upon-Thames, Surrey	England		1856			Carries the Waterloo to Reading Line across the Thames	
Stambermill Viaduct	Stourbridge, West Midlands	England		1850			Carries freight trains over the River Stour	
Stamford Bridge Viaduct	Stamford Bridge, East Riding of Yorkshire	England				II*	Carried the York to Beverley railway line over the River Derwent. Now disused.	
Stanford Viaduct a.k.a. Loughborough Viaduct	Stanford on Soar, Nottinghamshire	England		1899	Brick arch		carries the preserved Great Central Railway (Nottingham) across the River Soar	
Stanway Viaduct	between Toddington and Laverton, Gloucestershire	England		1904			carries the heritage Gloucestershire Warwickshire Railway	
Stockport Viaduct	Stockport, Greater Manchester	England	546 m (1,791 ft)	1840	Brick arch	II	carries the West Coast Main Line across the valley of the River Mersey	
Stonehouse Pool Viaduct	Plymouth, Devon	England					(demolished)	
Swin Bridge	County Durham	England		1830	Skew arch bridge		first skew arch bridge to carry a railway	
Swithland Viaduct	Swithland, Leicestershire	England		1897	Brick arch		carries the preserved Great Central Railway across Swithland Reservoir	
Tadcaster Viaduct	Tadcaster, North Yorkshire	England		1848	Stone arch	II	built by Leeds and York Railway to cross the River Wharfe – but never used.	
Tavy Bridge	Saltash, Devon	England		c. 1890	Stone arch		Carries the Tamar Valley Line over the River Tavy	
Tay Bridge	near Dundee	Scotland	3,286 m (10,781 ft)	1887			Carries the main line railway across the Firth of Tay	
Tees railway viaduct	Barnard Castle	England	223 m (732 ft)	1860			Carried the South Durham and Lancashire Union Railway over the River Tees. Demolished 1971	
Telescopic Bridge, Bridgwater	Bridgwater, Somerset	England			Bascule bridge	II*	Carried railway over the River Parrett. Now a footbridge.	
Thornton Viaduct	Thornton, West Yorkshire	England	270 m (890 ft)	1878	Stone arch		Carried GNR's Queensbury Lines across Pinchbeck Valley. Now disused.	
Torksey Viaduct	Torksey, Lincolnshire	England	80 m (260 ft)	1849	Box girder	II*	Earliest box girder bridge. Crosses the River Trent. Now disused.	
Treffry Viaduct	Luxulyan, Cornwall	England			Stone arch		Dual viaduct and aqueduct. Crosses the Luxulyan Valley. Now disused.	
Tregarne Viaduct	near Truro, Cornwall	England		1901	Stone arch			
Tregeagle Viaduct	near Truro, Cornwall	England		1902	Stone arch			
Trenance Viaduct	Newquay, Cornwall	England	142 m (466 ft)	1939	Stone arch	II	Crosses the Trenance Valley	
Trent Viaducts	between Derbyshire and Nottinghamshire	England		1901			Twin bridges replacing a single crossing of the River Trent	
Tresulgan Viaduct	Menheniot, Cornwall	England		1899	Stone arch			
Trevido Viaduct	Menheniot, Cornwall	England	148 m (486 ft)	1898				
Trowse Bridge	Norwich, Norfolk	England		1986	Swing bridge		Carries the Great Eastern Main Line over the River Wensum	
Truro Viaduct a.k.a. Moresk Viaduct	Truro, Cornwall	England	405 m (1,329 ft)	1904	Stone arch		Carries Great Western line over the Moresk valley	
Twerton Viaduct	Bath, Somerset	England	605 m (1,985 ft)	1840	Stone arch	II	Carries Great Western Railway through Twerton	
Uddingston Viaduct	Uddingston, South Lanarkshire	Scotland	92 m (302 ft)	1848	Cast iron arch	Cat A	Over the River Clyde. Augmented in 1903, then supplanted, by lattice girder bridge on same stone pillars	
Usk Railway Bridge	Newport, South Wales	Wales					Carries Great Western Main Line across the River Usk	
Vazon Sliding Railway Bridge	near Keadby, Lincolnshire	England			Sliding bridge		Carries the railway over the Stainforth and Keadby Canal	
Victoria Viaduct	Washington, Tyne and Wear	England	250 m (820 ft)	1838	Stone arch	II*	Carried former Durham Junction Railway over the River Wear. Now disused.	
Victoria Bridge	near Arley, Worcestershire	England	60 m (200 ft)	1861	Cast iron arch bridge		carries the Severn Valley Railway over the River Severn	
Walkham Viaduct	Horrabridge, Devon	England	335 m (1,099 ft)	1910	Iron girder		(disused)	
Warden Railway Bridge	Warden, Northumberland	England		1904	Cast iron beam		Carries the Newcastle to Carlisle line across the River South Tyne	
Warmsworth Viaduct	Doncaster, South Yorkshire	England	70 m (230 ft)		Lattice girder		Two viaducts (east (1910) and west (1914) cross the River Don	
Waterhead Viaduct a.k.a. Hoodown Viaduct	near Kingswear, Devon	England					Carries Paignton and Dartmouth Steam Railway over Waterhead Creek	
Watford Arches	Watford, Hertfordshire	England		1836	Brick arch		on the Watford DC Line. Crosses the River Colne.	
Weaver Viaduct a.k.a. Frodsham Viaduct	Frodsham Cheshire	England		1850	Stone arch	II	Carries railway line over the River Weaver	
Welland Viaduct	Seaton, Rutland	England	1,166 m (3,825 ft)	1878	Brick arch	II	crosses the valley of the River Welland	
Digswell Viaduct a.k.a. Welwyn Viaduct	Between Welwyn and Digswell	England	475 m (1,558 ft)	1850	Brick arch	II*	Carries two tracks over the Mimram Valley including the River Mimram. A historic bottleneck on the congested and vital East Coast Main Line.	
Westburn Viaduct	Westburn, South Lanarkshire	Scotland	130 m (430 ft)	1897			Also known as the Carmyle Viaduct. Crosses the River Clyde. No longer in use, track lifted and blocked off due to violence between youth gangs living on either side.	
West Largin Viaduct	near Bodmin Parkway, Cornwall	England				II		
Weston Mill Viaduct	Plymouth, Devon	England	370 m (1,210 ft)	1903	Stone arch/Steel			
Westwood Viaduct	near Bodmin Parkway, Cornwall	England	113 m (371 ft)	1879	Stone arch			
Whalley Viaduct, Whalley	Ribble Valley, Lancashire	England	620 m (2,030 ft)	1850	Brick arch	II	Carries the Ribble Valley Line over the River Calder	
Wharncliffe Viaduct	Hanwell, West London	England	270 m (890 ft)	1837	Brick arch		Carries Great Western Main Line railway across the Brent Valley	
Wheatley Viaduct	Wheatley Valley, Halifax, West Yorkshire	England	180 m (590 ft)		Stone arch		Halifax High Level Railway	
Whitley Viaduct		England					on the Narrow Gauge South Tynedale Railway, Cumbria/Northumberland	
Wicker Arches	Sheffield, South Yorkshire	England	600 m (2,000 ft)	1848		II*	Crosses the River Don	
Wickham Bishops Viaduct	Witham, Essex	England					Only wooden viaduct in England	
Willington Dene Viaduct	Wallsend, Tyne and Wear	England	320 m (1,050 ft)	1838	iron arch	II	Carries Tyne and Wear Metro over Wallsend Burn	
Windsor Railway Bridge	Windsor, Berkshire	England			wrought iron bowstring bridge		Carries the ex-GWR branch line over the River Thames	
Windsor Branch viaduct	near Windsor, Berkshire	England						
Winterbourne Viaduct a.k.a. Huckford Viaduct	Winterbourne, South Gloucestershire	England		1902	Brick arch		Carries Badminton railway line (Bristol Parkway to Paddington) over the River Frome	
Wivelscombe Viaduct	near Saltash, Cornwall	England	60 m (200 ft)				Demolished 1908	
Woodside Viaduct	Halifax, West Yorkshire	England					Demolished	
Wylam Railway Bridge	North Wylam, Northumberland	England	80 m (260 ft)	1876	Wrought iron through arch bridge		Carried railway across the River Tyne. Now a footbridge	
Yarm Viaduct	Yarm, North Yorkshire/County Durham	England	690 m (2,260 ft)	1852	Stone arch	II	Carries Northallerton to Eaglescliffe line	

== See also ==
- Category:Railway bridges in the United Kingdom
- List of bridges in the United Kingdom
- List of canal aqueducts in the United Kingdom
- List of lattice girder bridges in the United Kingdom
- List of tunnels in the United Kingdom
- List of bridges in Wales
- List of bridges and viaducts in Lincolnshire
