= Daisyfield Viaduct =

Viaduct in Bury, North-West England

Coordinates: 53.589369°N 2.310449°W

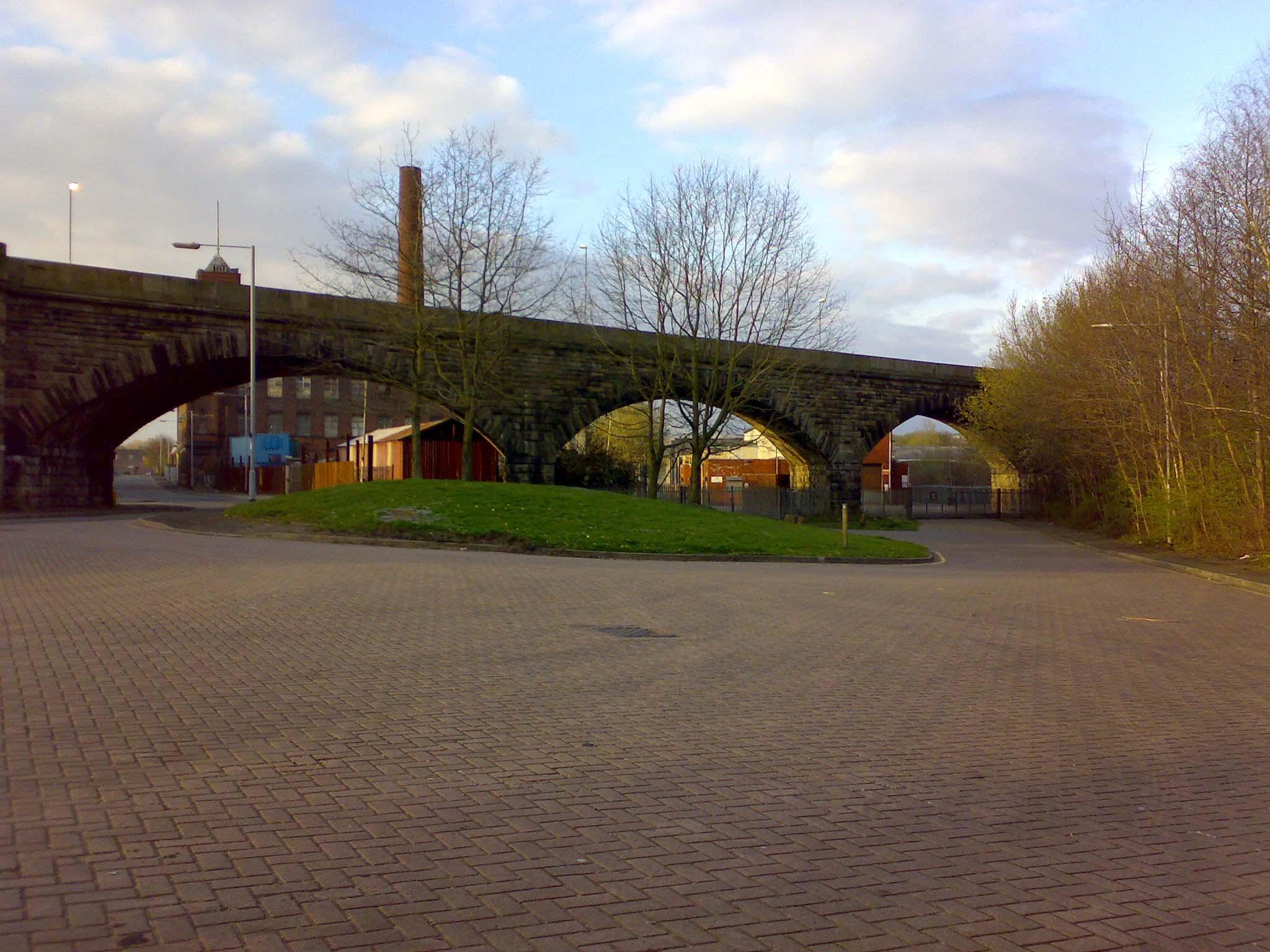
Daisyfield Viaduct, viewed from the south

Daisyfield Viaduct is a stone structure crossing the Manchester, Bolton and Bury Canal and River Irwell in Bury, Greater Manchester, England. It no longer carries trains, and is now used as a recreational feature for the general public.

== History ==
The viaduct originally carried the Bolton–Bury–Rochdale line and was abandoned in the 1970s. Trains heading east to Bury using this viaduct would typically stop at Knowsley Street station in Bury. It was restored for leisure use in 1999.

== See also ==
- List of railway bridges and viaducts in the United Kingdom
