= Bourne Valley Viaducts =

Bridges in Dorset, UK

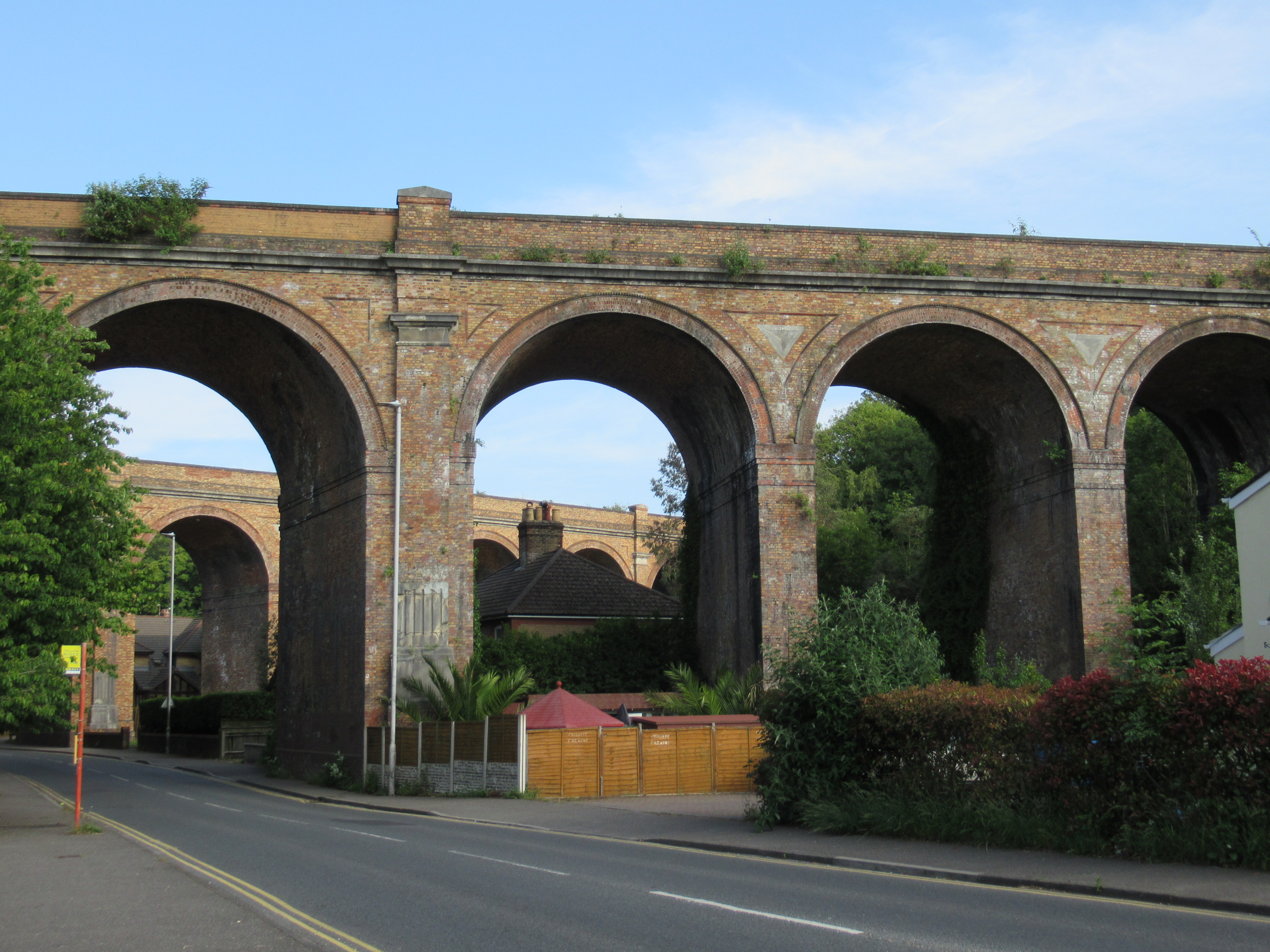
- The viaducts from the south in 2021
- Coordinates: 50°43′45″N 1°54′48″W

Characteristics
- Material: Brick
- No. of spans: 10
- Clearance below: Gordon Road, Surrey Road

History
- Built: 1888 (old bridge); 1893 (new bridge)
- Closed: 1965 (original bridge)

Location
- Interactive map of Bourne Valley Viaducts

The Bourne Valley Viaducts are two Victorian brick railway viaducts in Bournemouth and Poole, England. One bridge is disused while the other carries a section of the South West Main Line from London to Weymouth between Bournemouth railway station and Branksome railway station.

== History ==
In 1888, London and South Western Railway constructed a viaduct consisting of ten curved arches. In 1893, another viaduct was built on its west side that created a triangle of routes, allowing incoming trains to travel west towards Poole bypassing Bournemouth West railway station. The railway bridge crosses the River Bourne. Underneath the bridge are Surrey Road and Gordon Road near Coy Pond and Bournemouth Gardens as the railway follows Bourne Valley Road towards Branksome. The original bridge was closed in 1965 during the Beeching cuts. On 27 March 1941, an Luftwaffe air raid in World War II hit the nearby canteen at Bourne Valley Gasworks killing 33 people. It is believed that the viaducts had been the intended target. Repairs of the brickwork were carried out in 1998 costing £50,000.

In 2020, a lorry crashed into the bridge. The low arches at Bourne Valley Road reportedly make accidents common. In 2023, improvements to the bridge were carried out by BCP Council. In November 2024, the Bournemouth Daily Echo reported that the Branksome East Viaduct was earmarked for demolition. The viaduct is under structural threat according to the council, but its demolition is unlikely soon. The disused bridge is set for demolition by 2035 because it is “life expired”. A local community group intends to file an application for the listing of the viaduct and will develop an alternative plan to restore as a nature and heritage park.

== Gallery ==
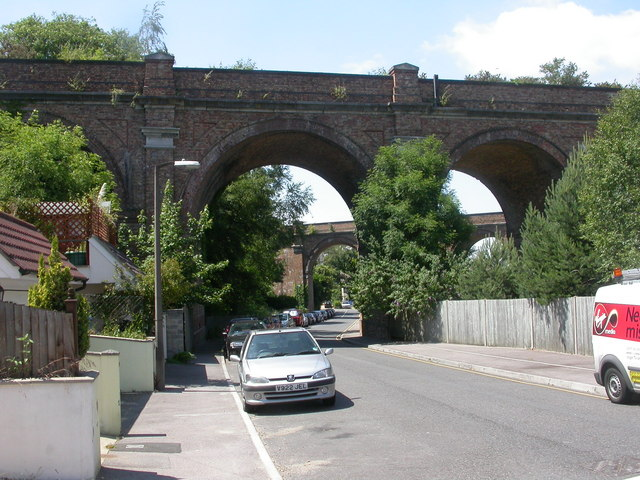
View from Gordon Road

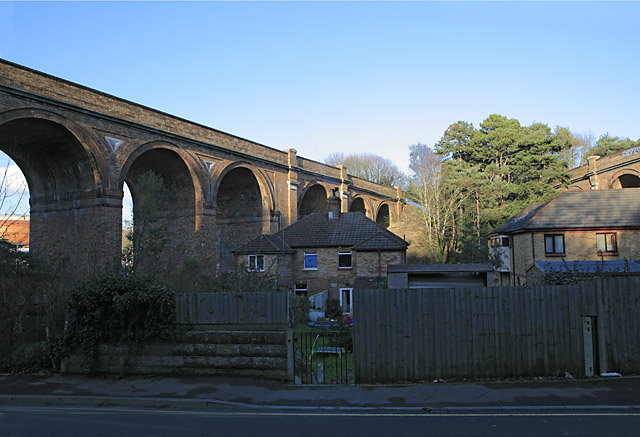
Houses in the vicinity

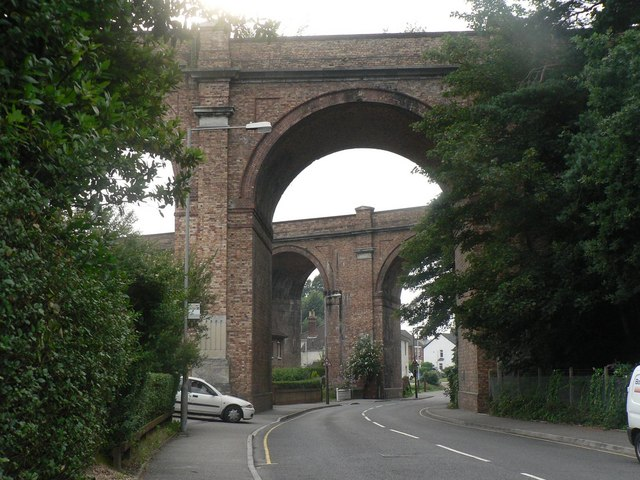
View from Surrey Road

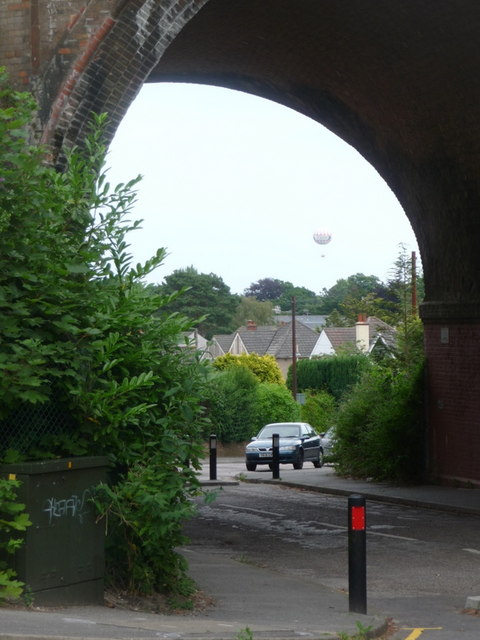
Bournemouth Eye from the bridge

The military defences from World War II remain beneath the bridge.

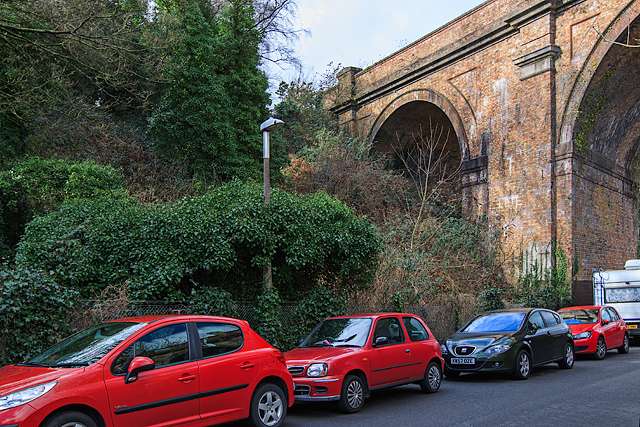

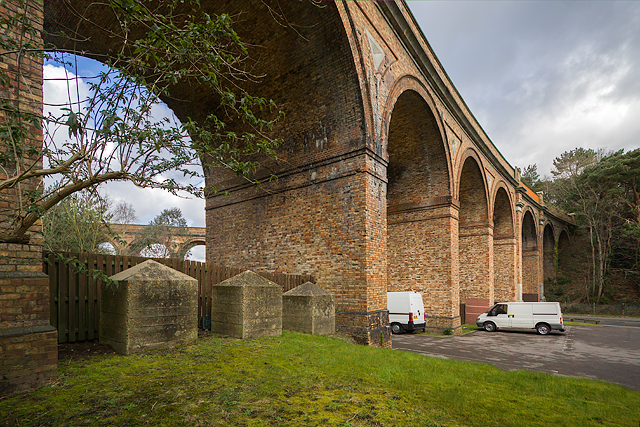

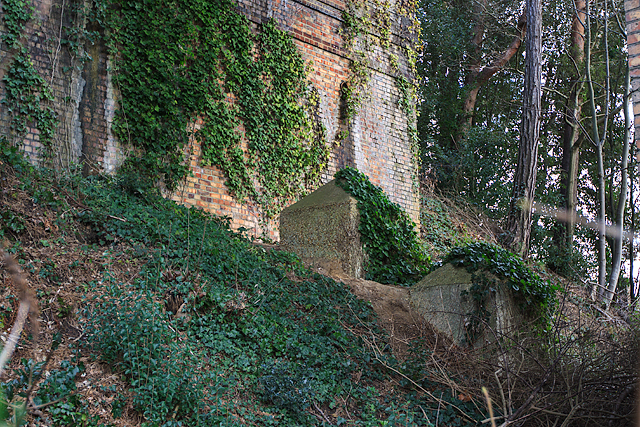

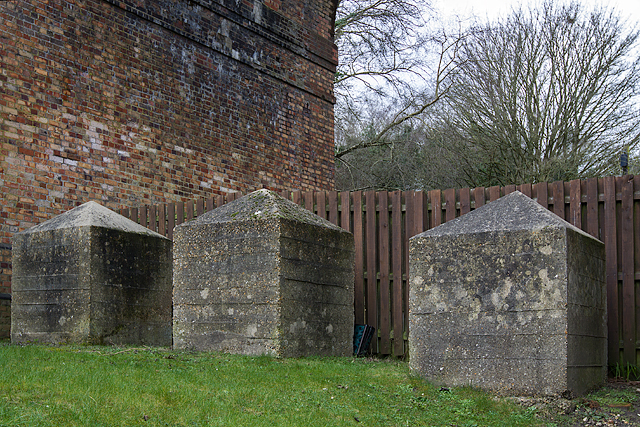

== See also ==
- List of railway bridges and viaducts in the United Kingdom
