= Six Arches, Ackworth =

Railway viaduct in West Yorkshire, England

Coordinates: 53.645°N 1.315°W

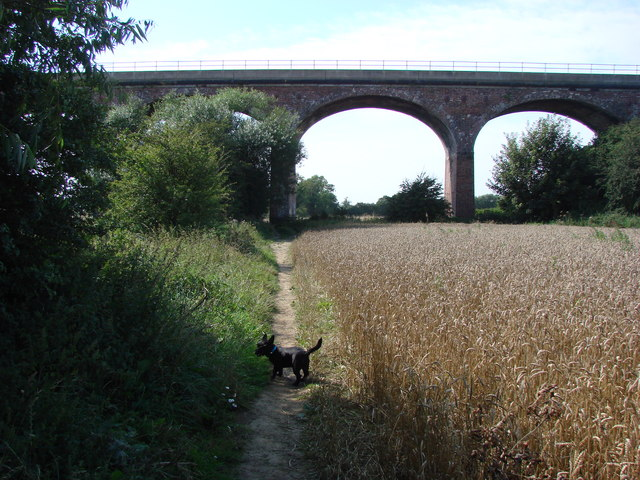
Six Arches Viaduct

The Six Arches is a railway viaduct in Ackworth, West Yorkshire, England, named after its design. It carries the Pontefract to Rotherham line over the River Went.

The viaduct was constructed for the Swinton and Knottingley Joint Railway, which opened in 1879. It remains in use as part of the Dearne Valley line although traffic is rather limited and a speed limit of 30mph is in force, probably to stop the mortar falling out.

Ackworth used to have a station, but it was shut down and demolished. The goods sheds still remain and have been converted into a private residence.

== See also ==
- List of railway bridges and viaducts in the United Kingdom
