= Cornwall Railway viaducts =

Timber-span viaducts in England

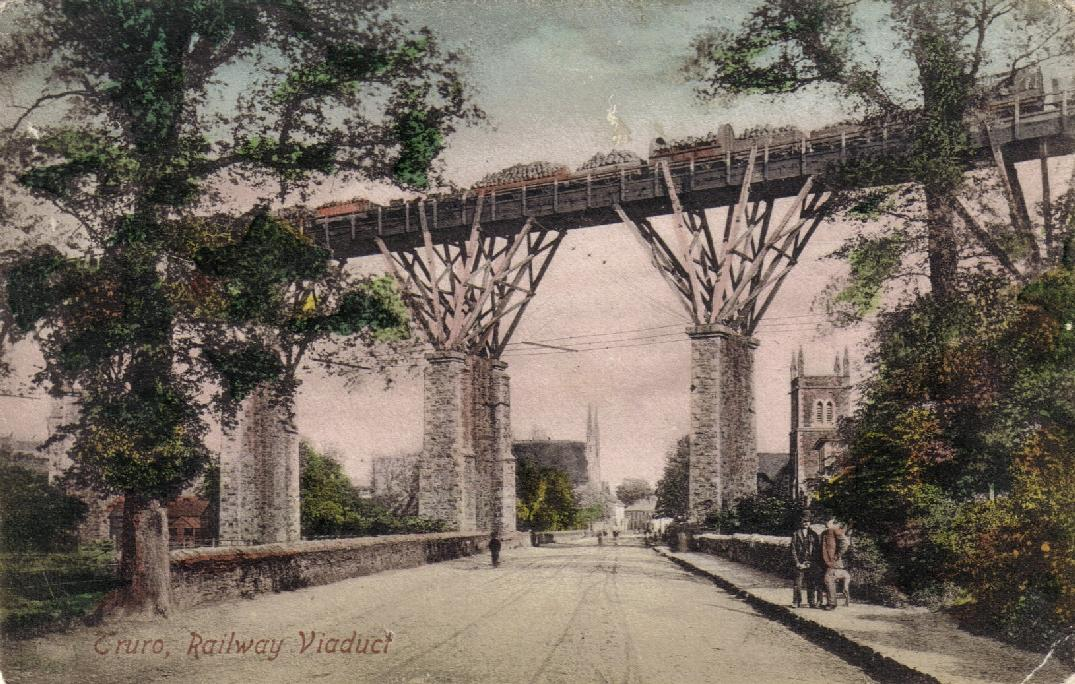
The 70 miles (110 km) of the Cornwall Railway included 42 wooden viaducts, such as Carvedras viaduct in Truro

The Cornwall Railway company constructed a railway line between Plymouth and Truro in the United Kingdom, opening in 1859, and extended it to Falmouth in 1863. The topography of Cornwall is such that the route, which is generally east–west, cuts across numerous deep river valleys that generally run north–south. At the time of construction of the line, money was in short supply due to the collapse in confidence following the railway mania, and the company sought ways of reducing expenditure.

On the advice of the Victorian railway engineer Isambard Kingdom Brunel, they constructed the river crossings in the form of wooden viaducts, 42 in total, consisting of timber deck spans supported by fans of timber bracing built on masonry piers. This unusual method of construction substantially reduced the first cost of construction compared to an all-masonry structure, but at the cost of more expensive maintenance.

Replacement of the timber viaducts by all-masonry structures began in the 1870s but a few remained in service until the 1930s.

== History ==
The Cornwall Railway linked Plymouth with Falmouth. The section from Plymouth to Truro was opened on 4 May 1859, and the remainder to Falmouth on 24 August 1863. Although the line had been designed by Brunel, this was after his death and the construction under the supervision of R P Brereton. It was built as a single-track 7 ft (2,134 mm) broad gauge line.

The 70 miles (110 km) of railway crossed 45 rivers and deep valleys. Of these 43 were spanned by viaducts of various types built partly or entirely from timber. Workshops were established at Lostwithiel where timber could arrive on barges to be preserved and cut to size. The offcuts from the timbers used for the viaducts and track were then used for the construction of the railway's buildings.

The choice of timber was made to keep initial costs down, but Brunel had warned that this meant more expensive maintenance—running to £10,000 annually. Replacement of the viaducts started in 1875 but led to a dispute in 1884 between the Cornwall Railway and the Great Western Railway which was leasing the line. The lease precluded the conversion of the line to 4 ft 8 1/2 in (1,435 mm) standard gauge, and the Cornwall Railway refused to pay for the widening of the viaducts during rebuilding sufficient to accommodate a double line of standard gauge tracks. Following the amalgamation of the two companies on 1 July 1889 all the remaining viaducts on the main line to Truro were replaced. Most were either rebuilt in situ or by a replacement viaduct built immediately alongside, and in the latter case many of the original piers still remain today.

Between Saltash and St Germans, a deviation line was built in 1908, eliminating the wooden viaducts on by-passed section of line. Those on the Falmouth branch were all replaced between 1923 and 1934.

== Constructional features ==
The distinctive timber viaducts were constructed using yellow pine which was preserved by Kyanising (using chloride of mercury), or sometimes by Burnettising (using chloride of zinc, a process patented by William Burnett) in the workshops at Lostwithiel. The various timbers were seated in cast iron chairs, and wrought iron was used for parts of the bridge which would be in tension, such as tie rods between spans. Five distinct types of viaduct were built to suit local conditions at each site. Peter John Margary, the Cornwall Railway engineer from 1868 to 1891, classified them as classes A to E.

- Class A: The majority of viaducts were constructed on stone piers that rose to about 34 feet (10 m) below track level. From the tops of these radiated three fans of timber struts to support the beams beneath the track; one fan on each side and the third beneath the centre of the track. The struts radiated at around 55, 75, 105 and 125 degrees from horizontal (resulting in a \\// form), although there were some slight variations. This gave piers spaced at about 65-foot (20 m) centres.
- Class B: A stronger support was given to St Pinnock, Largin, and Ponsanooth viaducts by replacing the central set of fan struts with a pair. These joined the outer fans at the top of the pier and met each other at the top, giving a W form when viewed across the width of the piers.
- Class C: The soft ground of the tidal valleys at Weston Mill, Forder, Wivelscombe, and Nottar required a lighter structure. This was achieved by dispensing with the stone piers and replacing them with vertical timber trestles built on top of timber piles driven into the mud. There were no fans supporting the track, instead timber trusses were built directly on top of the timber trestles.
- Class D: Coombe (by Saltash) and Moorswater viaducts had only two fans on each pier – one on each side – but the bottoms of these were joined by laminated timber beams between each set of fans, which created a continuous beam along the length of the viaduct above the top of the masonry piers.
- Class E: The shallowest valleys at Grove, Draw Wood, and Probus were crossed by simple trestles of three parallel fans with two struts each in a V shape.

Brunel's designs allowed any defective timber to be withdrawn and replaced. The first decay usually occurred at the bottom of legs where they were seated in the cast iron chairs, and around bolt holes. The other area with significant decay was generally underneath the decking that carried the track and ballast. After World War I it became difficult to obtain the preferred yellow pine and other timber with shorter life was used instead, although by this time only the viaducts on the Falmouth branch remained in use.

Special gangs of men worked together on the viaduct maintenance. To reach timbers below the deck they worked from 2.5 inches (64 mm) manila ropes. It was possible to work on the viaduct without closing the viaduct to trains, but a temporary 10 miles per hour (16 km/h) speed restriction was enforced until the replacement was properly in place. The actual movement of the larger timbers was carried out on a Sunday when there were few trains operating.

== Viaducts from Plymouth to St Germans ==
=== Stonehouse Pool ===
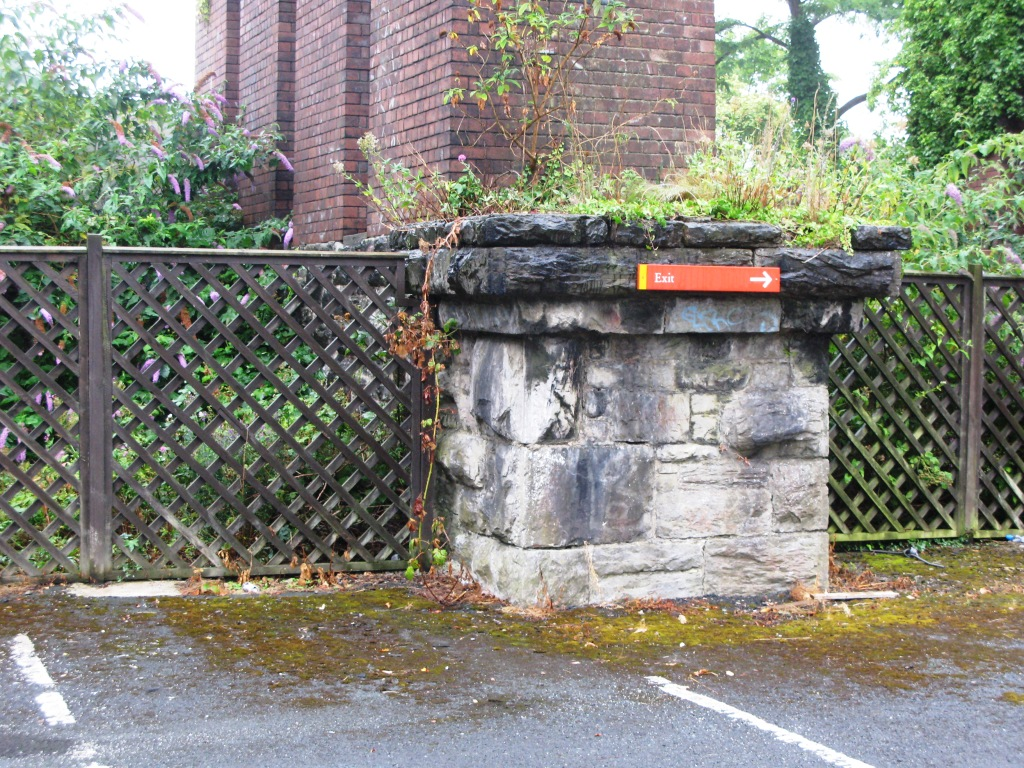
Original stone pier with brick pier of its replacement on top

Milepost 247.25 on original Millbay to Devonport line between Five Fields Lane (now North Road West) and Stuart Road, 1-mile (1.6 km) south of Devonport station. (50.376835°N 4.150043°W)

The only double track viaduct on the line, it was a Class A viaduct but with five fans of struts on each of the dwarf piers. It was 57 feet (17 m) high and 321 feet (98 m) long on 5 dwarf piers. Rebuilt with iron girders on brick piers in 1908.

The land below the viaduct was the head of a tidal creek but is now drained and forms a park. In 1876 a new Cornwall Loop between Plymouth North Road station and the Cornwall Railway was opened, built on a 131-yard (120 m) viaduct alongside the Stonehouse Pool Viaduct. Millbay station and its connecting lines (on which Stonehouse Pool Viaduct was located) were closed in 1964; the girders have since been removed and a steel work of art has been erected in its place.

=== Keyham ===
Milepost 248.75, 0.5 miles (0.80 km) north of Devonport. (50.386003°N 4.177809°W)

A Class A viaduct 90 feet (27 m) high and 432 feet (132 m) long on 6 piers. It was rebuilt using iron girders in 1900 which were again replaced with steel in 1937.

=== Weston Mill ===
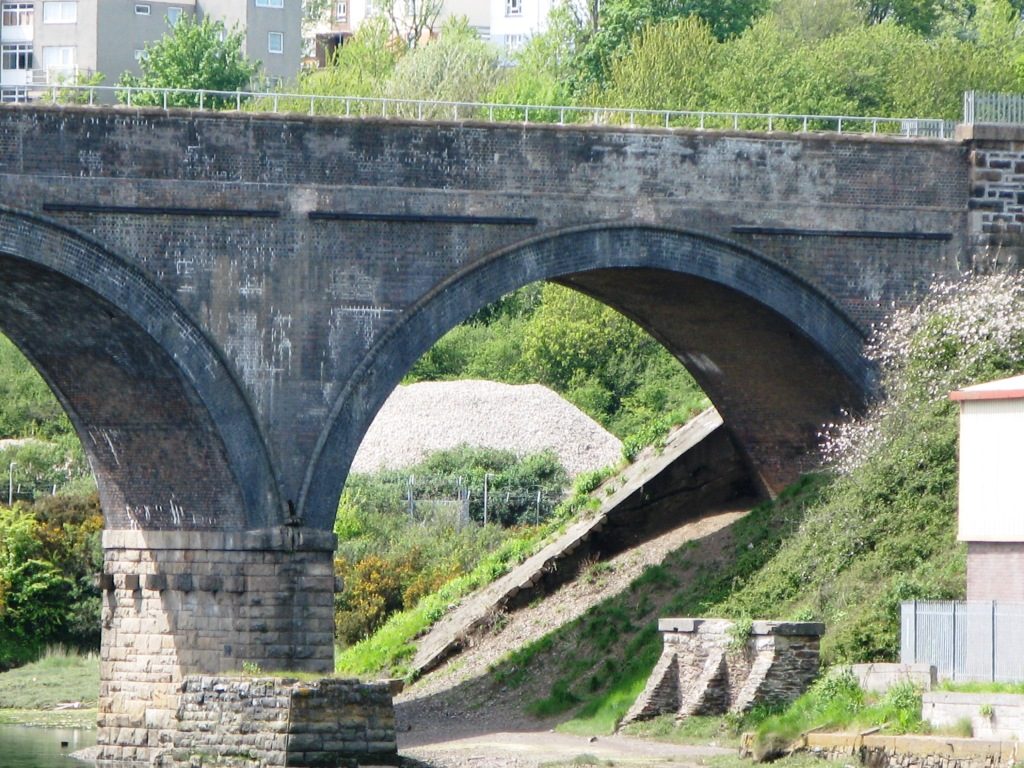
Surviving pier of the original viaduct beneath an arch of its replacement

Milepost 249.5, 1.25 miles (2.0 km) north of Devonport, above Weston Mill Creek. Keyham station was opened at the southern end in 1900. (50.395372°N 4.182511°W)

A Class C viaduct 46 feet (14 m) high and 1,200 feet (370 m) long on 29 trestles. It was replaced by a steel structure in 1903.

=== Royal Albert Bridge ===
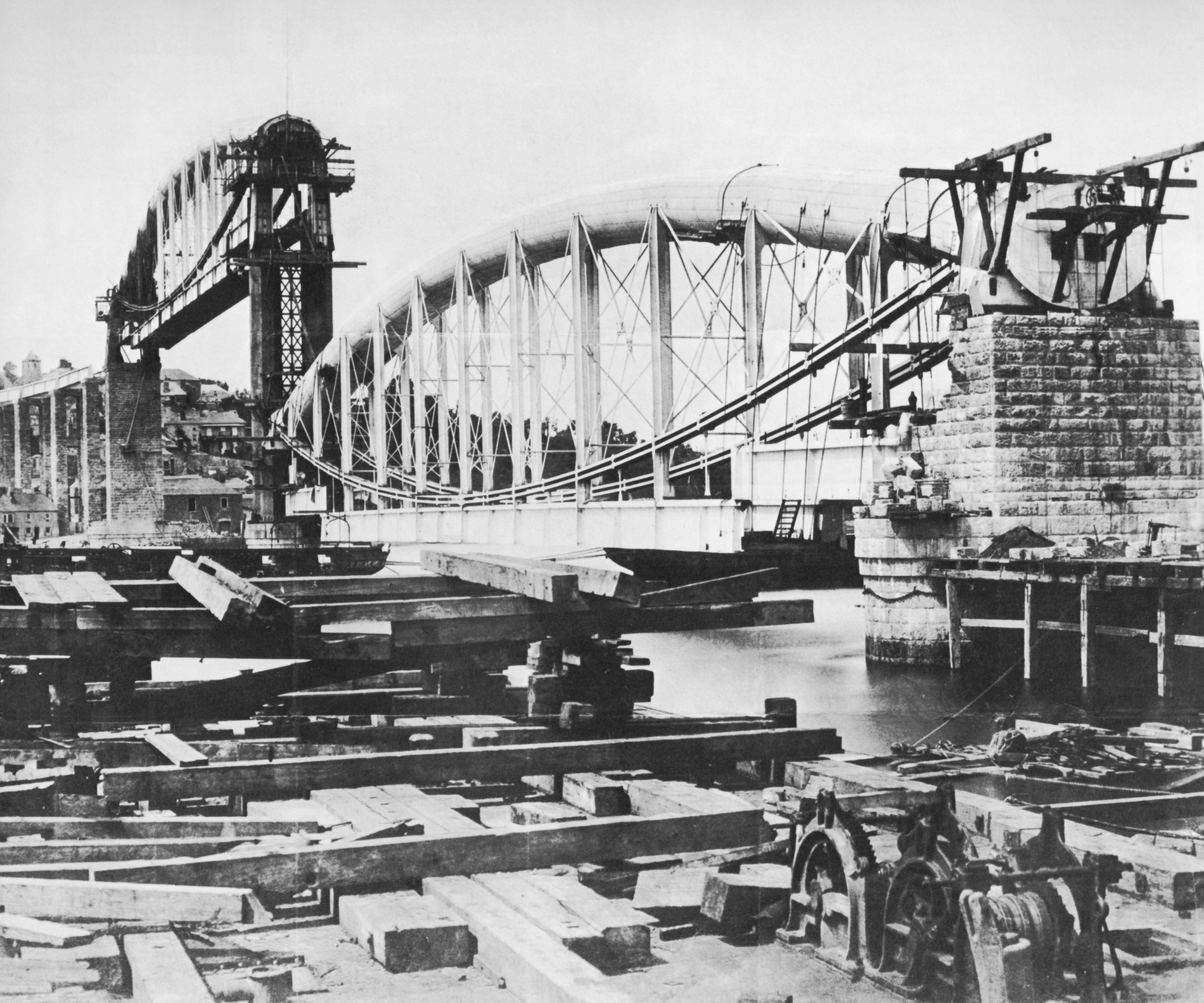
The Royal Albert Bridge under construction in 1858

Milepost 252, immediately east of Saltash station. (50.407575°N 4.203389°W)

This was the largest metal bridge on the route when it opened. A 2,187-foot-6-inch (666.75 m) wrought iron bridge (including two main spans of 455 feet (139 m)); it stands 100 feet (30 m) clear of high water.

=== Coombe by Saltash ===
Milepost 251.5, 0.25-mile (0.4 km) west of Saltash station. (50.404562°N 4.211637°W)

A Class D viaduct 86 feet (26 m) high and 603 feet (184 m) long on 9 trestles. It was replaced by a stone viaduct on 19 October 1894. Because it crossed a deep, muddy tidal inlet, Brunel constructed this viaduct on timber piles and used timber trestles instead of stone piers. These were made from four groups of four timber baulks, each group raking inwards towards the top of the trestle.

=== Forder ===
Milepost 252.25, 1.25 miles (2.0 km) west of Saltash. (50.395087°N 4.231024°W)

A Class C viaduct 67 feet (20 m) high and 606 feet (185 m) long on 16 trestles. It was demolished after the line was diverted to a more inland alignment on 19 May 1908, and replaced by a stone viaduct on the new alignment.

=== Wivelscombe ===
Milepost 253.5, 2.25 miles (3.6 km) west of Saltash. (50.390736°N 4.247503°W)

A Class C viaduct 25 feet (7.6 m) high and 198 feet (60 m) long on 4 trestles consisting solely of two uprights each plus a cross brace. It was demolished after the line was diverted to a more inland alignment on 19 May 1908.

=== Grove ===
Milepost 255.0, 1-mile (1.6 km) east of St Germans. (50.390682°N 4.283037°W)

A Class E viaduct 29 feet (8.8 m) high and 114 feet (35 m) long on two dwarf piers. The fans consisted of two raking struts on either side of the track, tied beneath the track by cross braces, and a central pair of struts which were joined at the top as an inverted V; from the side this gave a \|/ fan. It was demolished after the line was diverted to a more inland alignment on 19 May 1908.

A fatal accident occurred here just two days after the opening of the railway. On 6 May 1859 the engine of the 7.25 p.m. train from Plymouth was approaching St Germans when it left the rails, hit the parapet of the viaduct and fell into the mud below, landing upside down. Two of the coaches also ended up in the creek. The driver, fireman, and one guard were killed. A second guard, Richard Paddon, was given a reward of five pounds for his part in keeping the remainder of the train on the viaduct and helping to rescue the survivors. At the inquest held on 10 May 1859, the Permanent Way Inspector, the Traffic Superintendent, and Mr Brereton, Brunel's Chief Engineer, were all unable to account for the derailment, and the jury verdict was accidental death.

=== Nottar ===
Milepost 255.25, across the River Lynher 0.75 miles (1.2 km) east of St Germans. (50.392816°N 4.290075°W)

A Class C viaduct 67 feet (20 m) high and 921 feet (281 m) long on 27 trestles. It was demolished after the line was diverted to a more inland alignment on 19 May 1908.

=== St Germans ===
Milepost 256.0, across the River Tiddy 0.25-mile (0.4 km) east of St Germans. (50.393192°N 4.302349°W)

This timber viaduct was not included in Margary's classification system as it was not a fan viaduct. Instead it was a timber truss on 16 timber trestles, creating a viaduct 106 feet (32 m) high and 945 feet (288 m) long. Piles were driven into the mud and the trestles built on top from four groups of four timber baulks, each group raking inwards towards the top of the trestle. Where the piers were on the river bank the trestles rested on low masonry plinths. It was not possible to remove individual timbers from the trestles, unlike the fan viaducts which were designed with piecemeal maintenance in mind. It was demolished after the line was diverted to a new alignment on 19 May 1908.

== Viaducts from St Germans to Liskeard ==
=== Tresulgan ===
Milepost 261.0, 0.75 miles (1.2 km) east of Menheniot. (50.422738°N 4.392149°W)

A Class A viaduct 93 feet (28 m) high and 525 feet (160 m) long on 8 piers. It was replaced by a new stone viaduct on 26 March 1899.

=== Coldrennick ===
Milepost 261.5, immediately east of Menheniot station. (50.425239°N 4.406118°W)

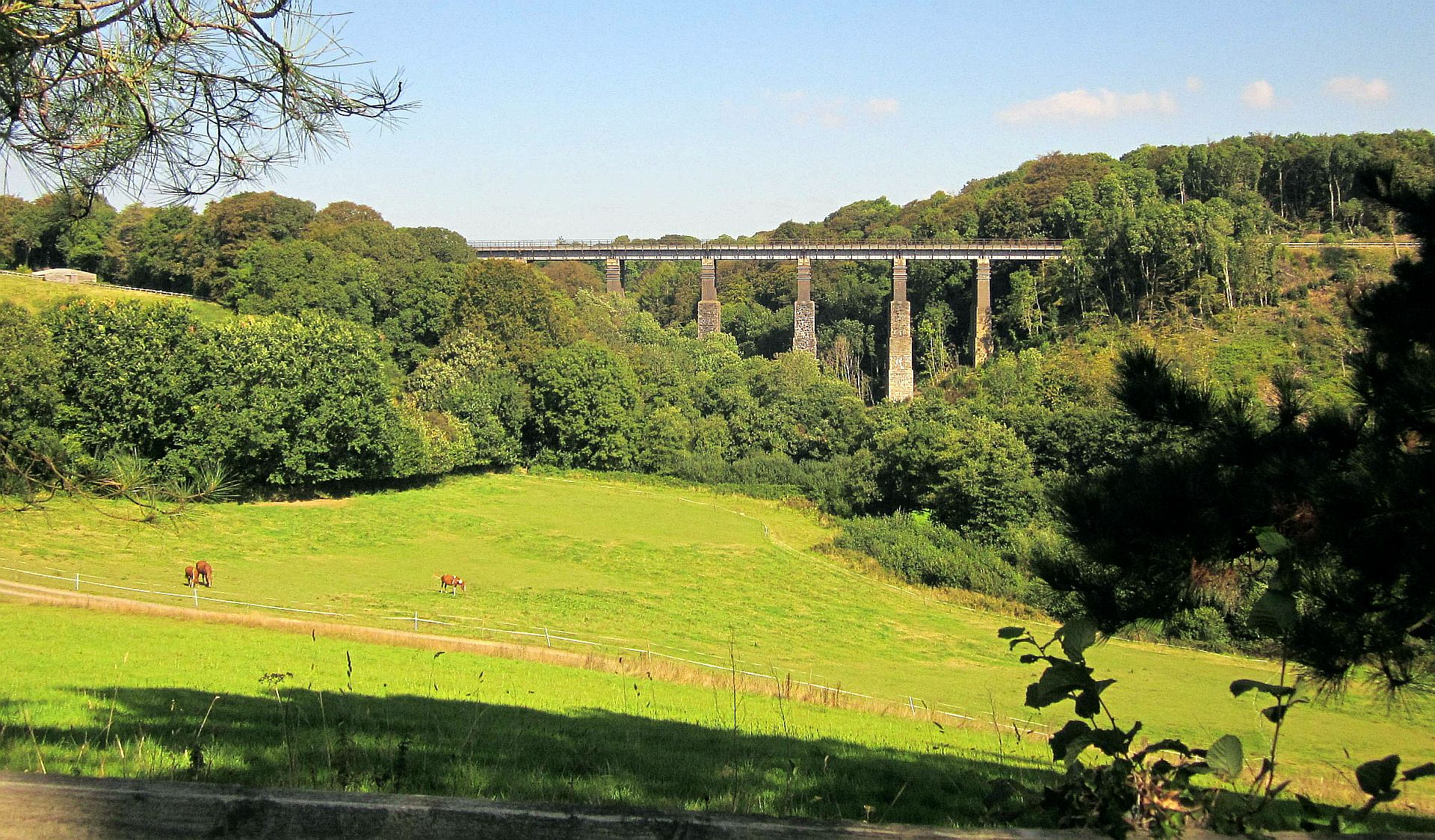
Coldrennick viaduct

A Class A viaduct 138 feet (42 m) high and 795 feet (242 m) long on 16 piers. The piers were raised in brick and new iron girders replaced the timber, the work being completed on 23 January 1898. The piers were further strengthened in 1933 by encasing them in stone.

The Times newspaper reported that it "is stated to be 134ft. high and is the highest of the whole series of bridges by which the [Cornwall] railway is carried".

Note: the original typography is maintained in the above quotation and in the quotations below.

An accident occurred on 9 February 1897 during the reconstruction while a gang of 17 workmen were working below the viaduct superstructure on a platform that collapsed, throwing 12 of the men 140 feet (43 m) to their deaths. They were working in the seventh span; cross-girders had been installed and they were positioning a longitudinal wrought iron rail-bearer, moving it by hand with one end supported on the viaduct pier. The rail-bearer was 20 feet long. The "platform" they were working on, spanning that gap, was supported by a second-hand timber beam formerly used as a main structural member in one of the other spans; it had several notches cut out (for its former use) and there was decay at the slenderest point. The supervising engineer said a chain should have been used to support the centre, to take part of the load of the men and the rail-bearer.

The inquest statements throw an interesting light on the working methods of the day:

Samuel Stephens, railway labourer, Liskeard, said he had been employed on Coldrenick-viaduct since the summer. The scaffolding which fell had been erected some weeks. At the time of the accident there were 13 men actually bearing on the platform which collapsed. There were about 17 men taking part in the work of removing the girder. As the girder was pushed forward more men came to the front bearing on the span which collapsed. When the men in front had the girder on their shoulders the weight on the platform would be increased. He and 12 other men were carrying the girder on their shoulders, one end being supported by the pier of the viaduct. Just as the other end of the girder was approaching a cross-girder on which it was intended to rest it the staging suddenly collapsed and 12 of the gang fell into the valley beneath.

P. C. Ball said he had examined the spar which gave way. It was 22ft. long and 8in. by 6in. in size, but pieces had been cut out of it. At one place there was an indentation 9in. by 4in. wide. At another place 2ft. away was another cut 30in. long and 2in. or 3in. wide. Another indentation was 48in. long. The break was in about the centre of the cut. The beam was reduced here to 5½in. thick, and just at this point there was a flaw in the span, the wood being decayed.

The jury after a long consultation found that the death of the 12 men was due to the fall of the platform that negligence was shown by the foreman Blewett in not causing chains to be used in constructing the platform, and also by the ganger Pearse in selecting defective timber for constructing the platform. They also found that Blewett and Pearse feloniously caused the death of the men.

=== Trevido ===
Milepost 262.5, 1 mile (1.6 km) west of Menheniot. (50.431076°N 4.427276°W)

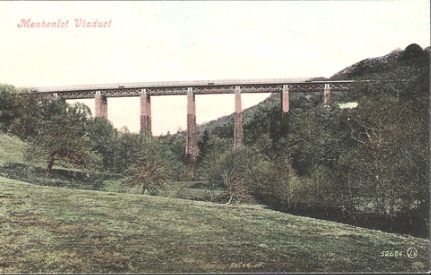
Trevido Viaduct after reconstruction, named Menheniot Viaduct on an old postcard

A Class A viaduct 101 feet (31 m) high and 486 feet (148 m) long on 7 piers. It was replaced by a new stone viaduct on 14 September 1898. An accident happened on 15 November 1897 during this reconstruction work. A rope gave way while five men were hoisting a wooden beam up onto the new viaduct. One of them let go of his rope too soon, as a result the beam swung free and knocked two of the gang to their deaths.

=== Cartuther ===
Milepost 264.0, 0.75 miles (1.2 km) east of Liskeard. (50.439646°N 4.453046°W)

A Class A viaduct 89 feet (27 m) high and 411 feet (125 m) long on 6 piers. It was replaced by a new stone viaduct on 8 January 1882.

=== Bolitho ===
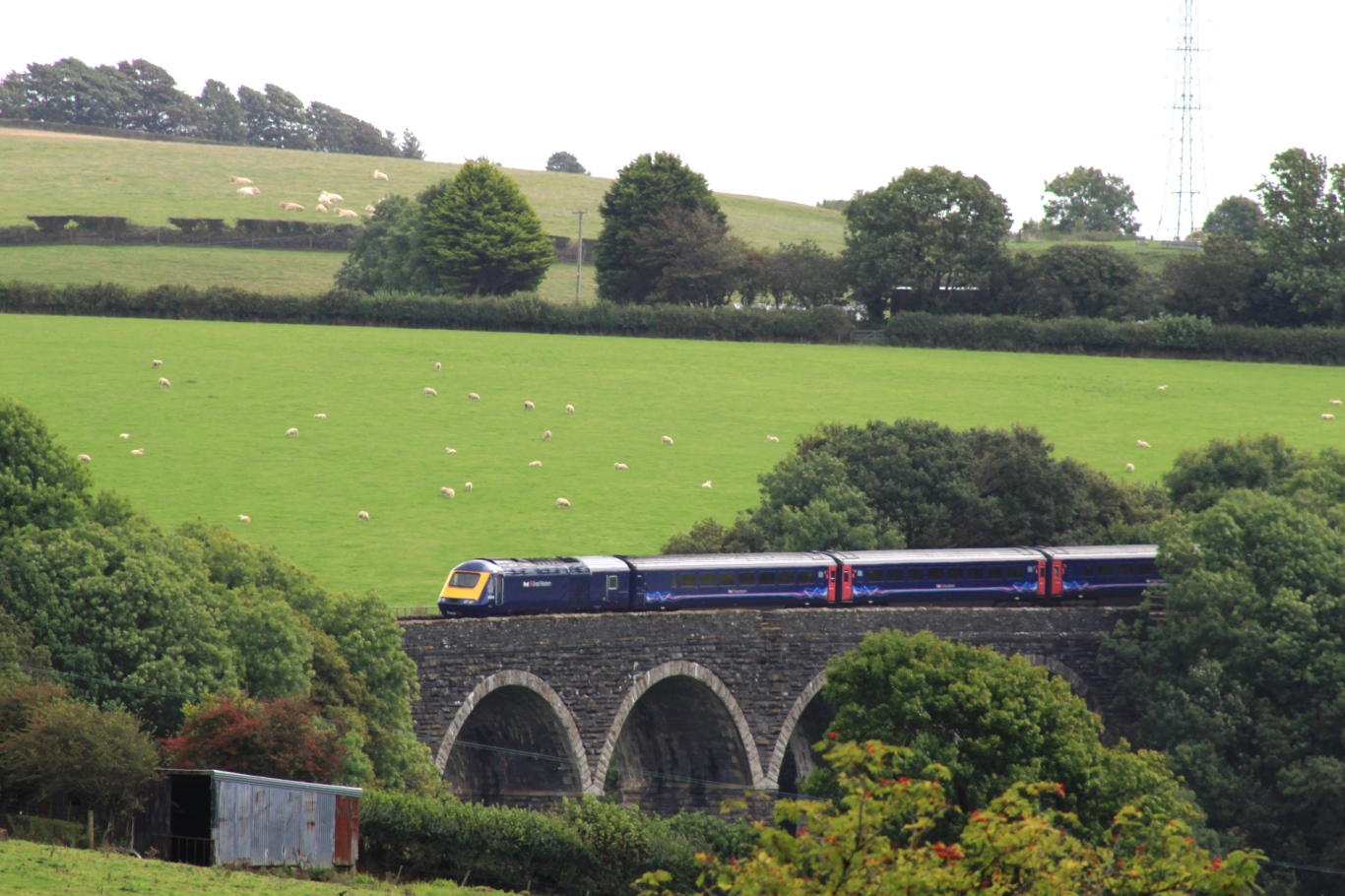
Bolitho Viaduct

Milepost 264.25, 0.25 miles (0.4 km) east of Liskeard. (50.442878°N 4.458668°W)

A Class A viaduct 113 feet (34 m) high and 546 feet (166 m) long on 8 piers. It was rebuilt as a stone viaduct in 1882.

=== Liskeard ===
Milepost 264.5, at the east end of Liskeard station. (50.445768°N 4.466575°W) Since 25 February 1901 the Looe branch line has passed beneath this viaduct.

A Class A viaduct 150 feet (46 m) high and 720 feet (220 m) long on 11 piers. It was rebuilt by raising the brick piers and replacing the timber with iron girders in 1894. These girders were renewed in steel in 1929.

== Viaducts from Liskeard to Bodmin Road ==
=== Moorswater ===
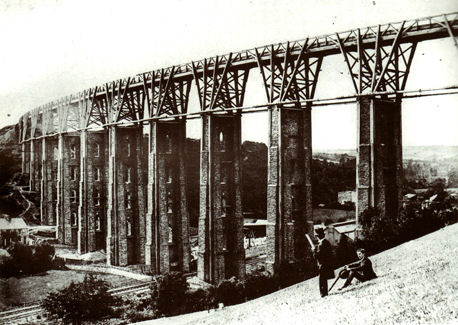
Moorswater Viaduct as built

Milepost 265.5, 0.5 miles (0.8 km) west of Liskeard. (50.449013°N 4.483999°W)

A Class D viaduct 147 feet (45 m) high and 954 feet (291 m) long on 14 buttressed piers. John Binding, in his study of Brunel's Cornish Viaducts, thought that Moorswater, by virtue of its size and location, was surely the most spectacular.

In 1855 two of the piers then under construction collapsed. Brunel inspected them and rebuilt them the following year to his original design. In 1867 about 12 feet (4 m) of one pier was dismantled and rebuilt. Instead of the usual metal tie rods between the tops of the piers, this viaduct was fitted with timber ties; vertical timber baulks were fitted at the corners of some piers.

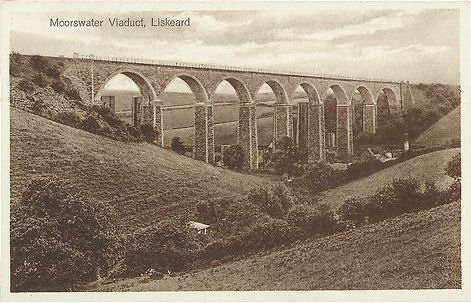
Moorswater Viaduct after reconstruction

It was replaced by a new eight-arch stone viaduct with cast iron parapets on 25 February 1881. During this work H.G. Cole, the resident engineer, was killed when a steam crane fell over. Six of the old piers still stand alongside the new viaduct, but the weakest piers were taken down before they collapsed. The new viaduct and the remaining piers of the original structure were listed Grade II* on 26 November 1985.

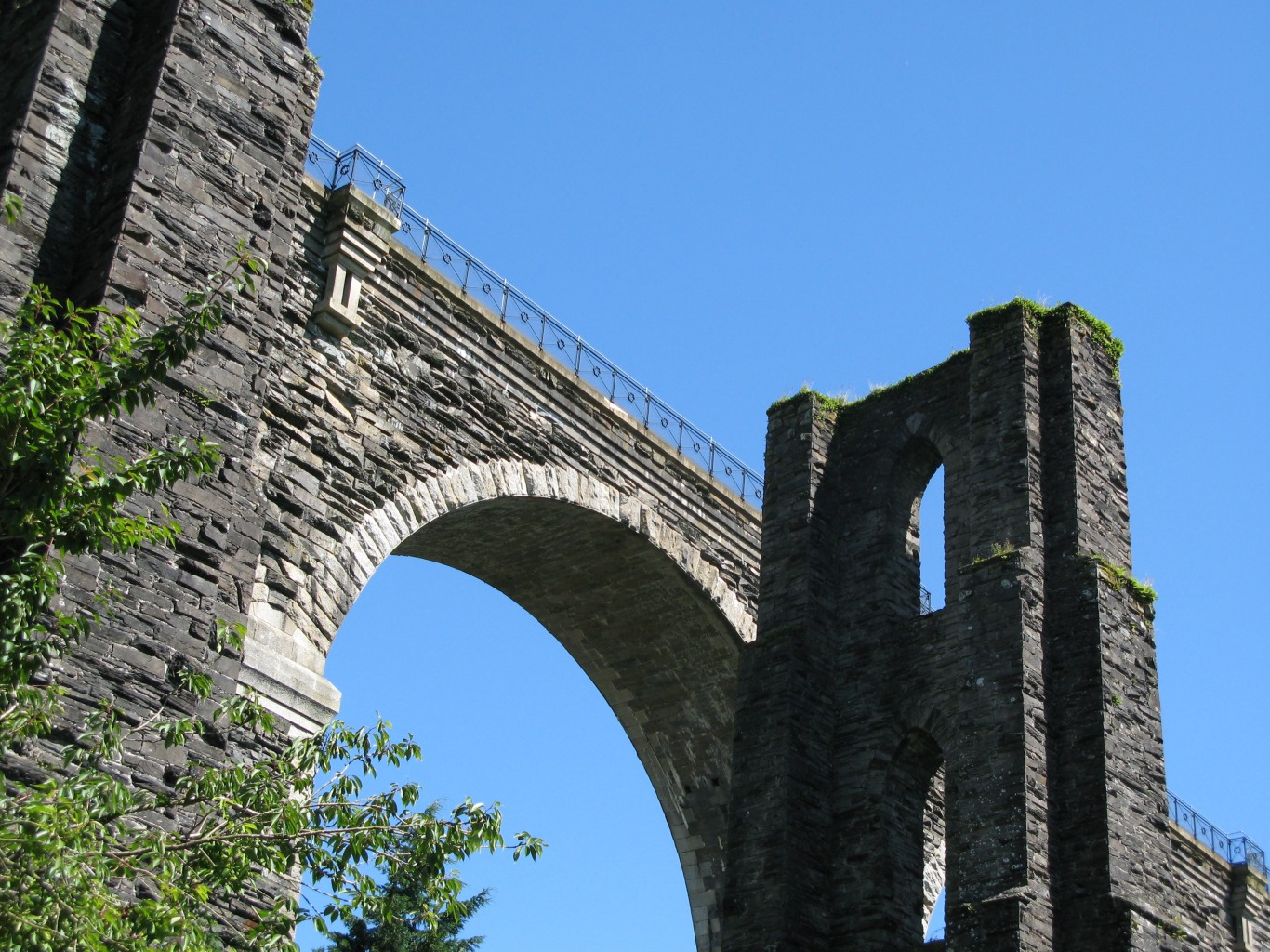
One of Brunel's piers of 1859 standing alongside the 1881 viaduct

The line that runs below this viaduct is the Liskeard and Looe Railway. To the south can be seen Coombe Junction Halt while to the north is the remains of Moorswater yard, still used by freight trains. Beyond this the Liskeard and Caradon Railway used to rise up onto the hills to serve various granite quarries.

=== Westwood ===
Milepost 269, 1 mile (1.6 km) west of Doublebois. (50.452738°N 4.560018°W)

A Class A viaduct 88 feet (27 m) high and 372 feet (113 m) long on 5 piers. It was replaced by a new stone viaduct on 14 December 1879. The quarry to the south of the railway provided stone for both the building and later rebuilding many of the viaducts in Cornwall.

=== St Pinnock ===
Milepost 269.5, 1.25 miles (2.0 km) west of Doublebois above the Trago Mills out-of-town shopping complex. (50.453064°N 4.568532°W)

A Class B viaduct 151 feet (46 m) high and 633 feet (193 m) long on 9 piers. It was rebuilt by raising the piers and replacing the timber with iron girders in 1882. This is the tallest viaduct on the Cornwall Railway. The line was singled over this viaduct on 24 May 1964 to reduce the load on the structure. This was listed Grade II in 1985.

=== Largin ===
Milepost 269.75, 1.75 miles (2.8 km) west of Doublebois. (50.452646°N 4.57708°W)

A Class B viaduct 130 feet (40 m) high and 567 feet (173 m) long on 8 piers. It was rebuilt by raising the piers and replacing the timber with iron girders on 16 January 1886. The line was singled over this viaduct on 24 May 1964 to reduce the load on the structure.

=== West Largin ===
Milepost 270.25, 2 miles (3.2 km) west of Doublebois. (50.454751°N 4.590182°W)

A Class A viaduct 75 feet (23 m) high and 315 feet (96 m) long on 5 piers. It was replaced by a new stone viaduct on 26 September 1875. This was listed Grade II in 1985.

=== Draw Wood ===
Milepost 270.5, 2.25 miles (3.6 km) west of Doublebois. (50.456466°N 4.595053°W)

A Class E viaduct 42 feet (13 m) high and 681 feet (208 m) long on 17 dwarf piers. It was replaced by an embankment and stone retaining wall in 1875.

=== Derrycombe ===
Milepost 271, 2.75 miles (4.4 km) west of Doublebois. (50.456698°N 4.599452°W)

A Class A viaduct 77 feet (23 m) high and 369 feet (112 m) long on 5 piers. It was replaced by a new stone viaduct on 8 May 1881. The new viaduct and the remaining piers of the original structure were listed Grade II in 1985.

=== Clinnick ===
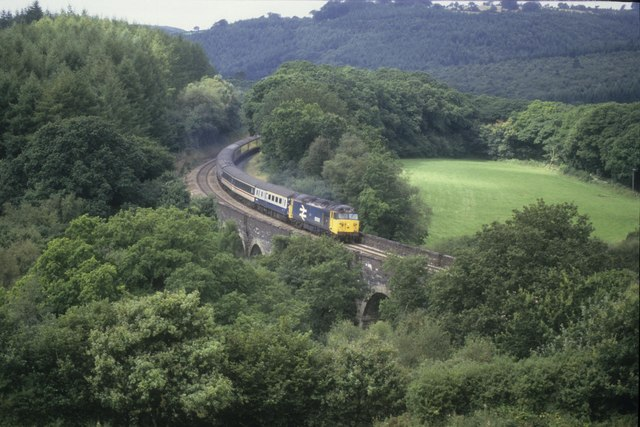
A train crossing Penadlake Viaduct (rebuilt in 1877)

Milepost 271.5, 2.5 miles (4.0 km) east of Bodmin Road. (50.457026°N 4.613099°W)

A Class A viaduct 74 feet (23 m) high and 330 feet (100 m) long on 5 piers. It was replaced by a new stone viaduct with an iron parapet on 16 March 1879. The new viaduct and the remaining piers of the original structure were listed Grade II in 1985.

=== Penadlake ===
Milepost 272.25, 1.75 miles (2.8 km) east of Bodmin Road. (50.455127°N 4.627937°W)

A Class E viaduct 42 feet (13 m) high, 426 feet (130 m) long on 10 dwarf piers; replaced by a new stone viaduct on 7 October 1877. This was listed Grade II in 1985.

== Viaducts from Lostwithiel to Truro ==
=== Lostwithiel ===
Milepost 277.75, 0.25-mile (0.4 km) west of Lostwithiel across the River Fowey. (50.404811°N 4.668514°W)

An 80-foot (24 m) wrought iron bridge with six 27-foot (8.2 m) timber approach spans. The date of replacement is uncertain.

=== Milltown ===
Milepost 278.5, 1-mile (1.6 km) west of Lostwithiel. (50.387809°N 4.668267°W)

A Class A viaduct 75 feet (23 m) high, 501 feet (153 m) long on 7 piers; replaced by a new stone viaduct in 1894.

=== Par ===
Milepost 282.25, 0.25-mile (0.4 km) west of Par. (50.348911°N 4.706268°W)

A 73-yard (67 m) five-arch stone viaduct to carry the line over a tramway, river and canal near Par Harbour. This was the only stone built viaduct on the line when it opened in 1859. It is known locally as the 'Five Arches'.

=== St Austell ===
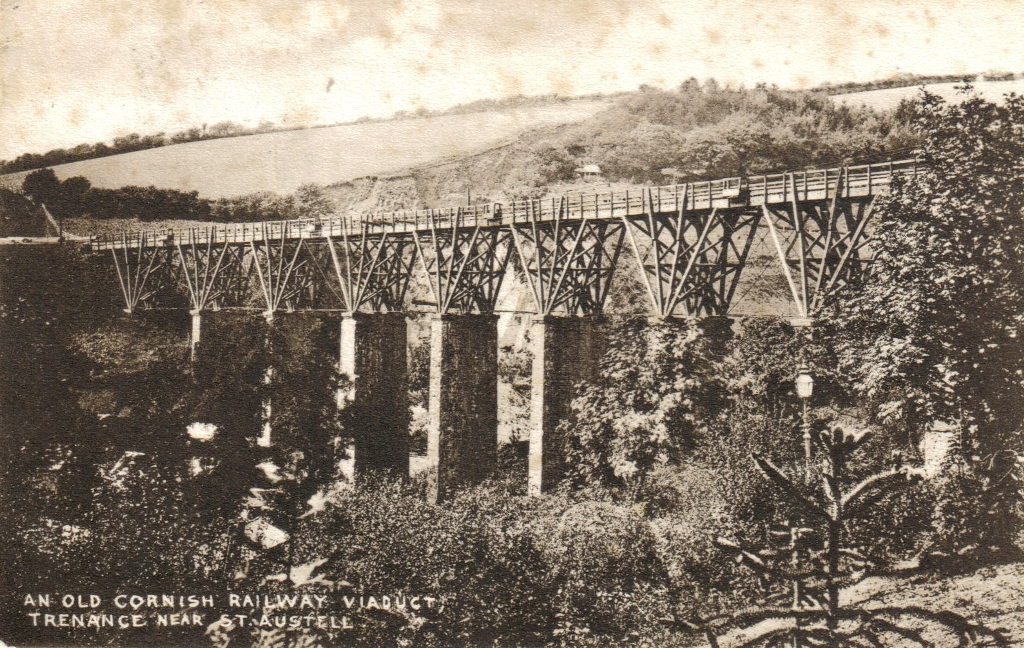
St Austell viaduct

Milepost 286.75, across the Trenance valley 0.5 miles (0.8 km) west of St Austell.
(50.342475°N 4.798064°W)

A Class A viaduct 115 feet (35 m) high and 720 feet (220 m) long on 10 piers. It was built on a curve and crosses the road to Bodmin at an angle. The pier next to this road had to be built to an unusual triangular plan to fit this unusual configuration. The viaduct was replaced by a new stone viaduct in 1899. This sprung from the same point at the St Austell end before taking up an adjacent alignment. This meant that the northern half of the new viaduct was built first, the timber structure dismantled, and then the southern side completed.

The viaduct is referred to as Trenance Viaduct on Ordnance Survey maps.

=== Gover ===
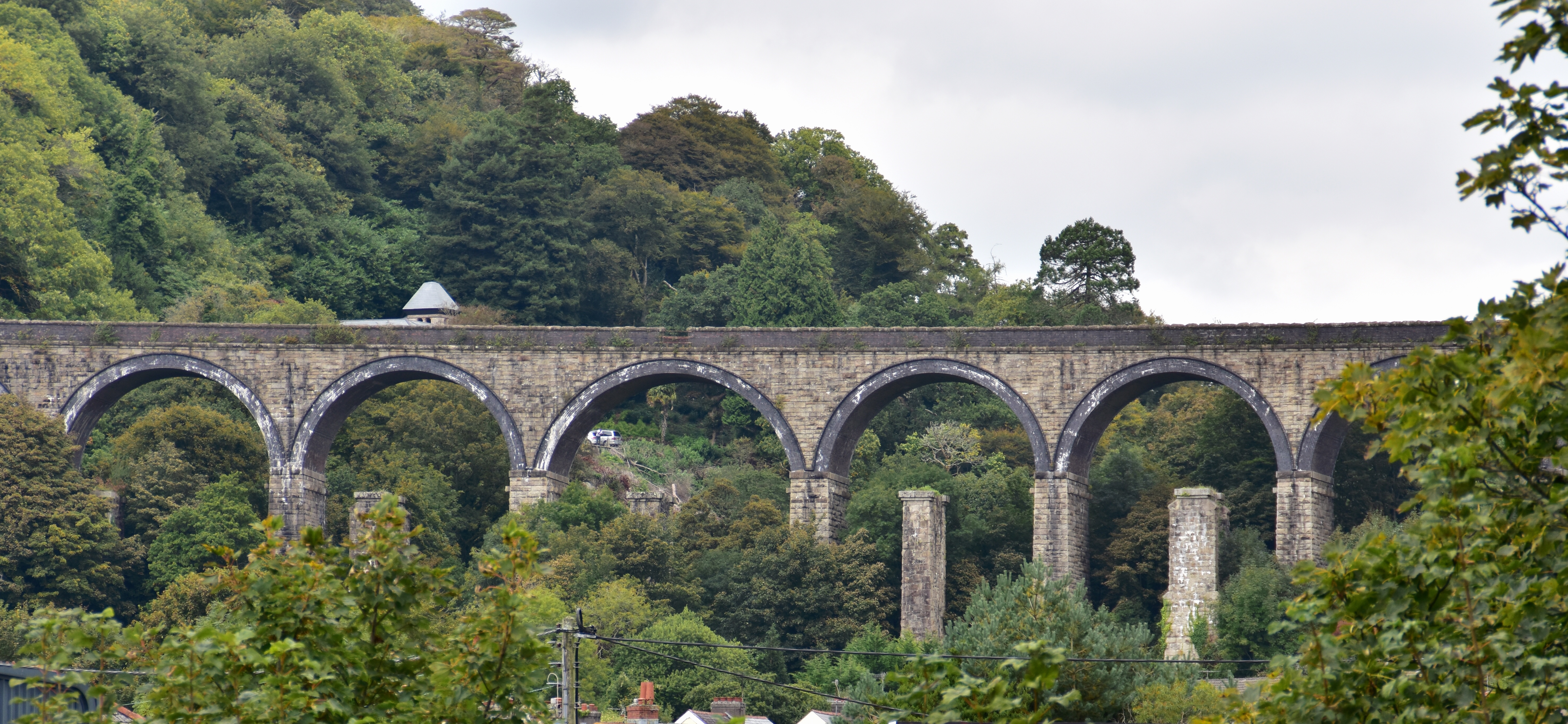
The Gover Viaduct in 2018, south side

Milepost 287.5, 1.25 miles (2.0 km) west of St Austell. (50.342598°N 4.813685°W)

A Class A viaduct 95 feet (29 m) high and 690 feet (210 m) long on 10 piers. It was replaced by a new stone viaduct in 1898. This viaduct and the remaining piers of the original structure were listed Grade II in 1988.

=== Coombe St Stephens ===
Milepost 291.25, 2 miles (3.2 km) east of Grampound Road. (50.324094°N 4.889281°W)

A Class A viaduct 70 feet (21 m) high and 738 feet (225 m) long on 11 piers. It was replaced by a new stone viaduct on 11 July 1886. The surviving piers from Brunel's viaduct were listed Grade II in 1988.

=== Fal ===
Milepost 291.75, 1.5 miles (2.4 km) east of Grampound Road. (50.320203°N 4.899194°W)

A Class A viaduct 90 feet (27 m) high and 570 feet (170 m) long on 8 piers. It was replaced by a new stone viaduct on 24 August 1884.

=== Probus ===
Milepost 295.25, 2 miles (3.2 km) west of Grampound Road (50.308049°N 4.950585°W). Probus and Ladock Halt was opened a quarter of a mile east of the viaduct site on 1 February 1908.

A Class E viaduct 43 feet (13 m) high and 435 feet (133 m) long on 11 dwarf piers. It was replaced by an embankment in 1871.

=== Tregarne ===
Milepost 296.75, 3.5 miles (5.6 km) west of Grampound Road. (50.287475°N 4.987578°W)

A Class A viaduct 83 feet (25 m) high and 606 feet (185 m) long on 9 piers. It was replaced by a new stone viaduct on 1 September 1901.

=== Tregeagle ===
Milepost 297, 3.75 miles (6.0 km) west of Grampound Road and 0.5-mile (0.80 km) east of Polperro Tunnel. (50.286666°N 4.998565°W)

A Class A viaduct 69 feet (21 m) high and 315 feet (96 m) long on 4 piers. It was replaced by a new stone viaduct on 2 February 1902.

=== Truro ===
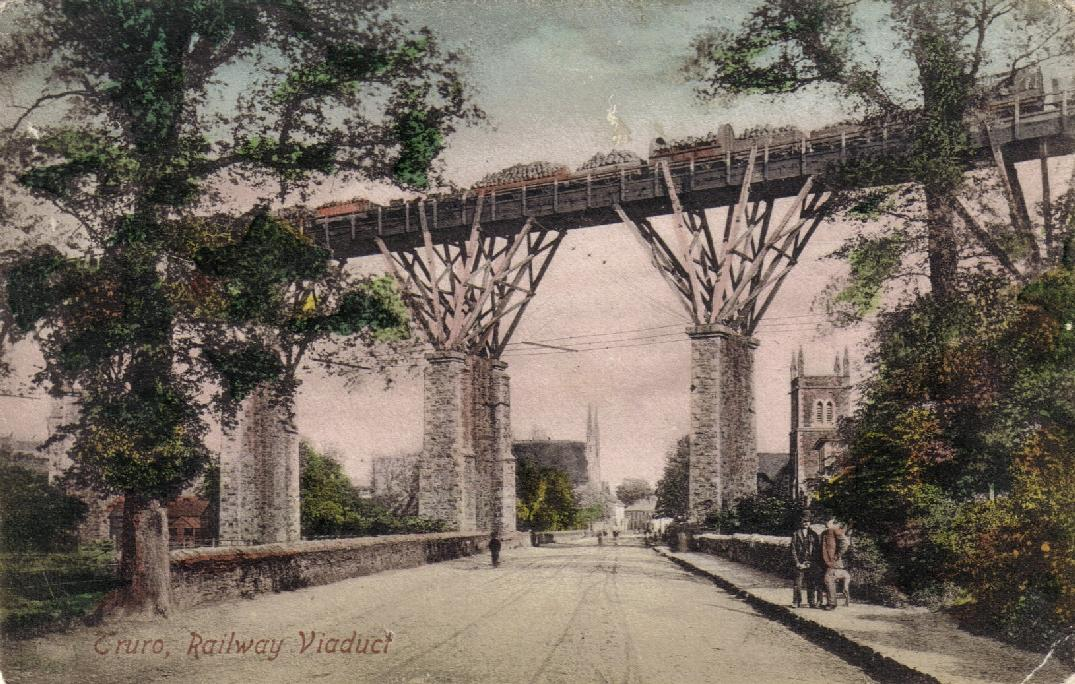
Carvedras viaduct

Milepost 300, 1-mile (1.6 km) east of Truro. (50.267591°N 5.053303°W)

Sometimes known as Moresk Viaduct, this Class A viaduct is 92 feet (28 m) high and 1,329 feet (405 m) long on 20 piers. 14 of these still stand alongside the replacement stone viaduct which was brought into use on 14 February 1904.

=== Carvedras ===
Milepost 300.5, a short distance east of Truro station. (50.264724°N 5.060427°W)

A Class A viaduct 86 feet (26 m) high and 969 feet (295 m) long on 15 piers. It was replaced by a new stone viaduct on 17 August 1902. The new viaduct and the remaining piers of the original structure were listed Grade II on 30 July 1993.

== Viaducts from Truro to Falmouth ==
=== Penwithers ===
Milepost 301.5, 0.25-mile (0.4 km) west of the junction with the West Cornwall Railway to Penzance. (50.251925°N 5.083065°W)

A Class A viaduct 90 feet (27 m) high and 813 feet (248 m) long on 12 piers. It was rebuilt as an embankment in 1926.

=== Ringwell ===
Milepost 304, 1-mile (1.6 km) north of Perranwell. (50.227442°N 5.101004°W)

A Class A viaduct 70 feet (21 m) high and 366 feet (112 m) long on 5 piers. It was rebuilt as an embankment in 1933.

=== Carnon ===
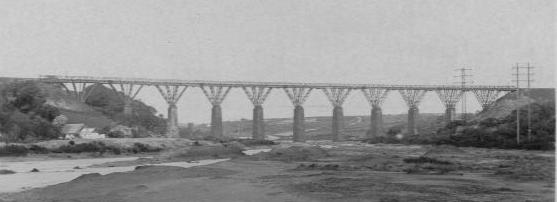
Carnon viaduct

Milepost 304.25, 0.5-mile (0.8 km) north of Perranwell. (50.223515°N 5.106411°W)

A Class A viaduct 96 feet (29 m) high and 756 feet (230 m) long on 11 piers. The soft nature of valley floor meant that some piers had to have a foundation built for them by sinking a temporary caisson and removing the mud within it. It was replaced by a new stone viaduct on 13 August 1933.

This viaduct crossed Restronguet Creek and the Redruth and Chasewater Railway near its Devoran terminus. This disused railway line now forms part of the Mineral Tramway Trails.

=== Perran ===
Milepost 305.75, 1-mile (1.6 km) south of Perranwell. (50.211598°N 5.131216°W)

A Class A viaduct 56 feet (17 m) high and 339 feet (103 m) long on 5 piers. It was replaced by a new stone viaduct on 24 April 1927.

=== Ponsanooth ===
Milepost 307, across the River Kennal 2 miles (3.2 km) north of Penryn. (50.195638°N 5.135851°W)

A Class B viaduct 139 feet (42 m) high and 645 feet (197 m) long on 9 piers. It was replaced by a new stone viaduct on 7 September 1930. This is the tallest viaduct west of Truro.

=== Pascoe ===
Milepost 307.25, 1.75 miles (2.8 km) north of Penryn. (50.188742°N 5.126967°W)

A Class A viaduct 70 feet (21 m) high and 390 feet (120 m) long on 6 piers. It was replaced by an embankment in 1923.

=== Penryn ===
Milepost 308.75, 0.25 miles (0.4 km) north of Penryn. (50.172143°N 5.113621°W)

A Class A viaduct 63 feet (19 m) high and 342 feet (104 m) long on 5 piers. It was replaced by an embankment in 1923.

=== Collegewood ===
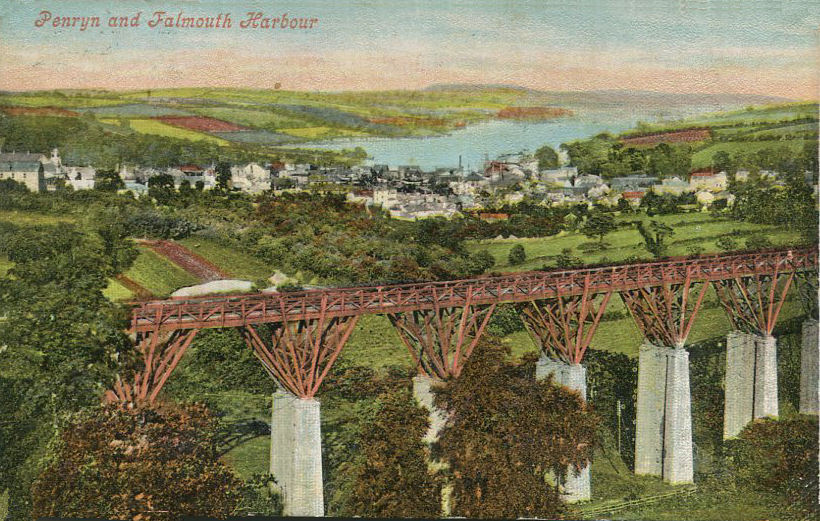
Collegewood viaduct from an old postcard

Milepost 309.5, 0.25-mile (0.4 km) south of Penryn. (50.166178°N 5.108857°W)

A Class A viaduct 100 feet (30 m) high and 954 feet (291 m) long on 14 piers. It was replaced by a new stone viaduct on 22 July 1934. This was the longest viaduct west of Truro and the last timber viaduct to be replaced in Cornwall. The piers of the original viaduct still stand and are listed Grade II.

== See also ==
- List of railway bridges and viaducts in the United Kingdom
- Angarrack Viaduct
- Penponds Viaduct
