= Arten Gill Viaduct =

Railway viaduct in Cumbria, England

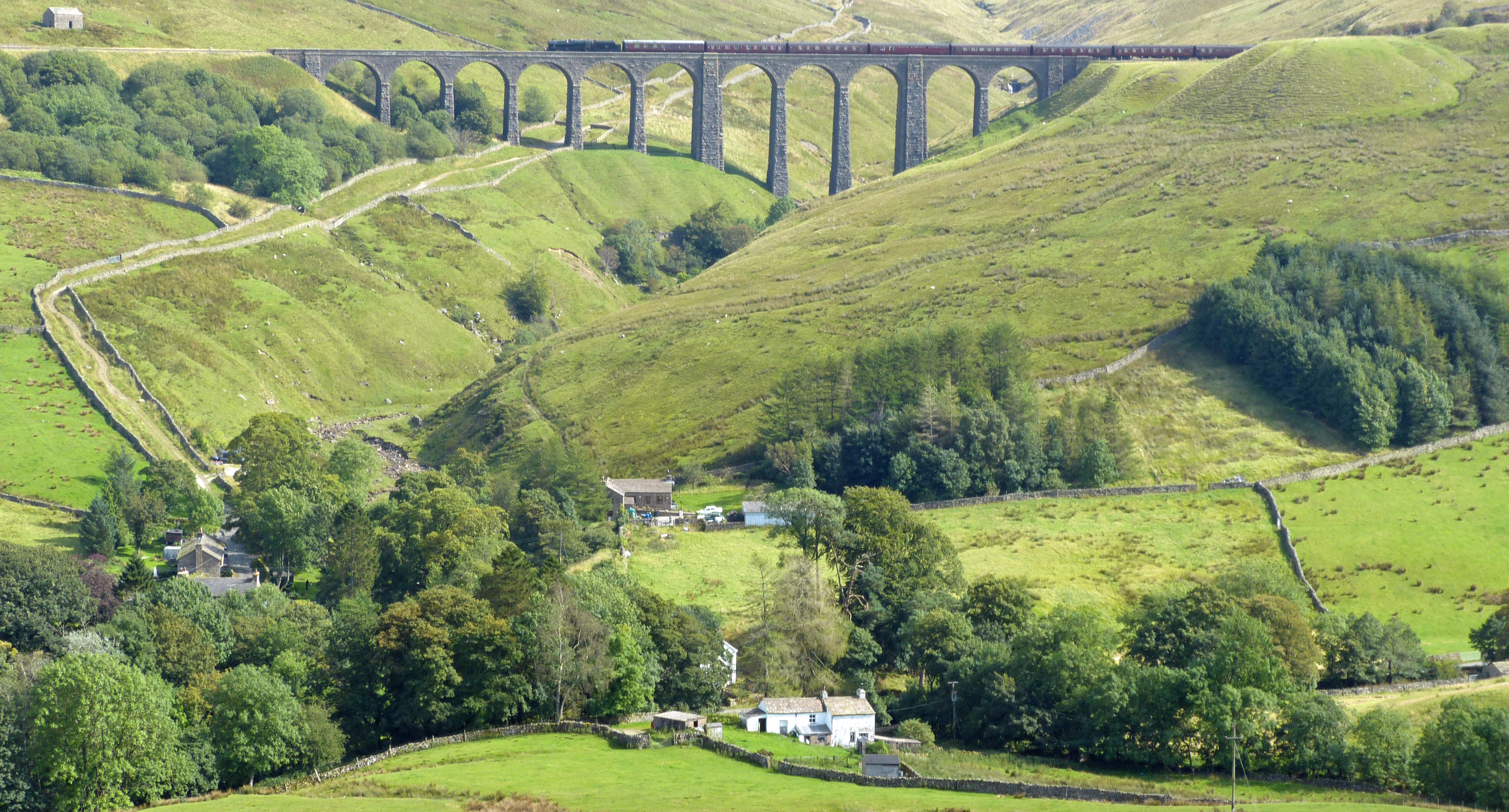
- Arten Gill Viaduct; the drovers road and Artengill Beck are both easily recognisable
- Coordinates: 54.268°N 2.345°W
- OS grid reference: SD776859
- Carries: Settle–Carlisle line
- Crosses: Artengill
- Locale: Dentdale, Cumbria, England
- Other name: Artengill
- Owner: Network Rail

Characteristics
- Material: Sandstone; Dent Marble
- Total length: 220 yards (200 m)
- Height: 117 feet (36 m)
- No. of spans: 11

Rail characteristics
- No. of tracks: 2
- Track gauge: 4 ft 8 1/2 in (1,435 mm) standard gauge

History
- Architect: John Sydney Crossley
- Construction start: May 1871
- Construction end: July 1875

Statistics

Listed Building – Grade II
- Designated: 18 October 1999
- Reference no.: 1383817

Location
- Interactive map of Arten Gill Viaduct

Arten Gill Viaduct is an eleven-arch railway bridge in Dentdale, Cumbria, England. The viaduct carries the Settle to Carlisle railway line over Artengill Beck. The viaduct was originally designed to be further west, which is lower down the steep valley side, but by moving the line slightly eastwards, the viaduct could be installed at a higher location, thereby using fewer materials in its height. Arten Gill Viaduct is constructed partly from Dent Marble in the inside of the arches instead of the more usual brick. Dent Marble is a type of dark limestone which was quarried from Artengill beneath the viaduct itself. The viaduct is a grade II listed structure, and a scheduled monument.

== History ==
Groundwork on site was started in May 1870, with work on the viaduct itself beginning a year later, on 3 May 1871. The parapets were completed in July 1875, with the date being set into the middle stone on each side of the parapet wall. Arten Gill Viaduct is 660 feet (200 m) long, and 117 feet (36 m) high, with the parapets being 1,100 feet (340 m) above sea level. The viaduct has 11 arches, each of which is 45 feet (14 m) across.

Whilst it is largely constructed of sandstone, the inner arches of the viaduct spans (soffit) are made from Dent Marble, as opposed to brick, which was normal practice for viaduct building at that time. Most of the Dent Marble used in the viaduct was sourced from a quarry directly underneath the bridge in Artengill, (Note: One source states that the stone came from Blea Gill Quarry, which is actually nearer to Dent Head.) and at least 50,000 tonnes (55,000 tons) of dressed stone was used in its construction. The use of Dent Marble has been attributed to the proximity of the quarry, rather than of the need for that particular type of stone. There was one recorded fatality during the building process, a worker in the quarry was crushed by a stone, with some of the stones weighing as much as 6 tonnes (6.6 tons). The size of the stones also often lead to the breakdown of the lifting gear.

Due to the loose soil and rock on the valley floor, some of the viaduct piers were rooted to a depth of 55 feet (17 m). Each pier of the viaduct is 38 feet (12 m) in circumference, and 15 feet (4.6 m) in diameter at the bottom, tapering to 6.5 feet (2 m) at the base of each of the arches.

The viaduct was constructed by Benton and Woodiwiss as part of Contract No. 2 (Dent Head to Smardale Viaduct, a total of 17 miles (27 km)), and Arten Gill is listed as bridge number 84. Like many of the viaducts along the line, it was designed by John Sydney Crossley. As designed, the viaduct was intended to cross the Artengill further west (where Great Knoutberry Hill slopes downwards), but by diverting the line eastwards, the viaduct straddled the top of a waterfall, rather than the bottom, saving some 50 feet (15 m) in height. This course, and change of position, also meant that the viaduct bows out slightly eastwards, as it follows the contours of the hill. The viaduct was also constructed with two sets of widened piers in the middle; this was in case of collapse, the widened piers would provide stability, and stop the rest of the viaduct collapsing too.

As indicated by the name of the viaduct, it crosses a steep valley through which the small watercourse of Artengill passes, but also an old pack-horse route eastwards across the moors. The route between Blea Moor Tunnel and Garsdale traverses the western edge of Great Knoutberry Hill and so needed several cuttings. These were prone to collecting snow during heavy winters, and attempts in clearing the snowdrifts involved dispatching the snow over the edge of Arten Gill Viaduct.

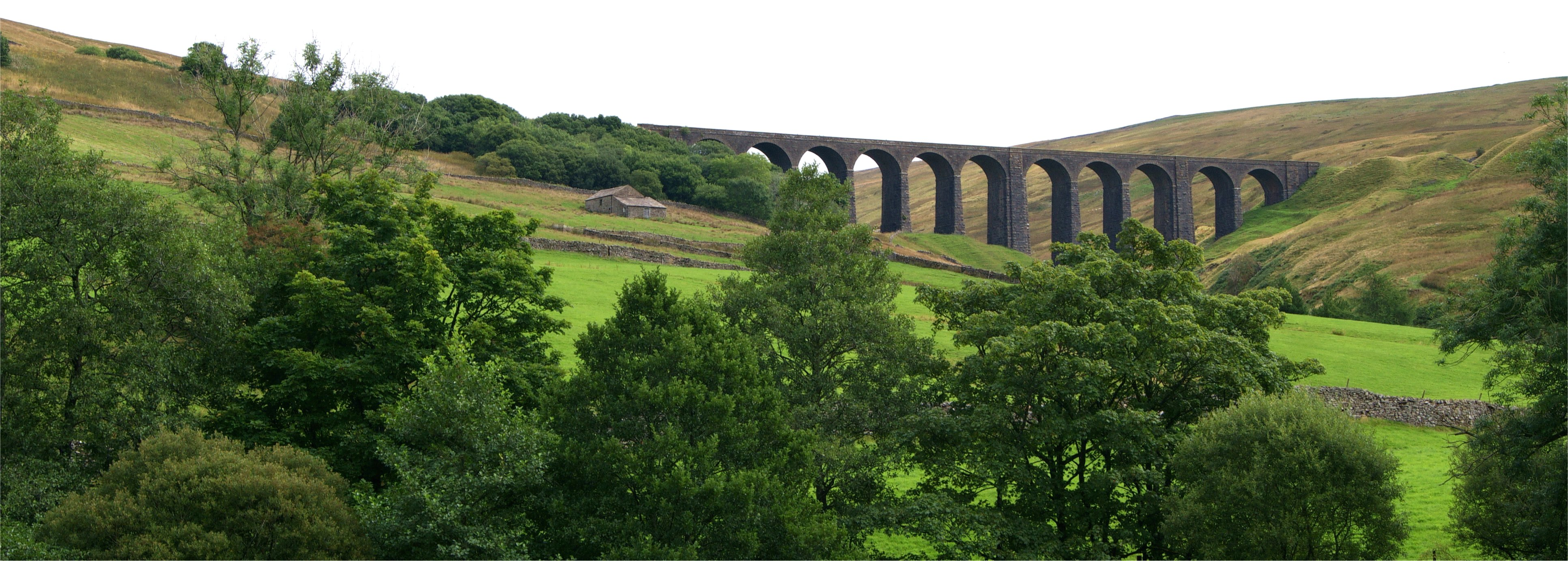
The imposing Arten Gill Viaduct, one of two in close proximity, just up the line from Dent Head Viaduct on the Settle - Carlisle route

The viaduct is included briefly in the film Miss Potter, though at least one writer points out that on her journey from London to Windermere, she would not have been travelling over the Settle-Carlisle Railway line at that point. Arten Gill is a scheduled monument, and was also grade II listed in October 1999.

== Name ==
Most railway authors and railway mapping list the viaduct as being called Arten Gill. However, the beck it straddles is called Artengill, which persists as a variant spelling for the viaduct. Historic England name the viaduct both as Arten Gill, and Artengill in their heritage listing, as do some writers.

== See also ==
- Infrastructure of the Settle–Carlisle line
- Listed buildings in Dent, Cumbria
