= Markland Grips Viaduct =

- Coordinates: 53°16′10.89″N 1°14′13.56″W
- Carries: Ex-Lancashire, Derbyshire and East Coast Railway
- Crosses: Markland Grips Gorge
- Locale: Between Clowne and Creswell, Derbyshire

Characteristics
- Design: 6 stone arches
- Width: Twin Standard Gauge Rail

History
- Opened: 16 November 1896
- Closed: 9 January 1967

Location
- Interactive map of Markland Grips Viaduct

Markland Grips Viaduct is a former railway viaduct south east of Clowne, Derbyshire, England.

== Context ==
The viaduct carried the LD&ECR's double-track Langwith Junction to Sheffield Beighton Branch over a limestone gorge known as "Markland Grips". It was situated midway between the former Clowne South and Creswell and Welbeck railway stations. Opened in 1896, it had six equal stone arches.

Timetabled passenger services over the viaduct ended in September 1939 but summer weekend excursions from Manchester Central to Yarmouth Vauxhall and Sheffield Victoria to Skegness continued until 1964.

Traffic on the line was mostly freight, especially coal but it was used as a relief and diversionary route for Sheffield - Lincoln traffic and for Great Central Main Line. As traffic declined so did the need for the Beighton Branch. Coal was carried on the branch from three collieries by the 1960s - Creswell and Langwith at its southern end and Westthorpe (Killamarsh) at its northern end. The north Nottinghamshire "superpits" sent most of their output to power stations in the Trent valley to the east. By the mid-1960s the Great Central was in terminal decline and traffic over the Beighton Branch could be accommodated on what is now the Robin Hood Line. When the M1 motorway was extended northwards, it would have required an expensive bridge to cross the Beighton Branch. The viaduct had required extensive strengthening for some time.

The viaduct was reinforced by cross members and then by cross members plus beams. These measures were to counteract the effects of mining subsidence. Finally a concrete "tunnel" was built for wheeled and foot users and the viaduct was buried under spoil to turn it into an embankment.

A new connection across fields south of Creswell and Welbeck station was built to connect the Beighton Branch to what is now the Robin Hood Line. The Beighton Branch became redundant and was closed on 9 January 1967 across Markland Grips Viaduct, through Clowne to Spinkhill Tunnel. The tracks were lifted. Langwith Colliery's output continued to go south over the southern section until 8 September 1969, after which it went via the Robin Hood line. Westthorpe's went north over the northern section until the colliery closed in 1984.

After closure railway land was sold and the trackbed was used to access the viaduct site which was mined for limestone. These operations finished about 1973. The concrete tunnel was still in place in 2012.

== Modern times ==
Clowne South station site was for a number of years a community skate park, but after much antisocial behaviour, this was removed, the land sold and houses built on it instead. The railway trackbed from there southeastwards towards the site of Markland Grips Viaduct is the publicly accessible Clowne Linear Park. The trackbed south of the viaduct site to Creswell is used as a footpath, but its legal status is unclear.

Markland Grips is an SSSI managed by Derbyshire Wildlife Trust, who list them as Hollinwell and Markland Grips. External links to relevant websites are given below.
