= Carmyle =

Suburb in Glasgow, Scotland

Coordinates: 55.8305°N 4.1552°W

Carmyle: Scottish Gaelic: An Càrn Maol
- Location within the Glasgow City council area Location within Scotland
- OS grid reference: NS651618
- Council area: Glasgow City
- Lieutenancy area: Glasgow
- Country: Scotland
- Sovereign state: United Kingdom
- Post town: GLASGOW
- Postcode district: G32
- Dialling code: 0141
- Police: Scotland
- Fire: Scottish
- Ambulance: Scottish
- UK Parliament: Glasgow East
- Scottish Parliament: Glasgow Shettleston

Carmyle (/kɑːrˈmaɪl/; Scottish Gaelic: An Càrn Maol) is a suburb in the east end of Glasgow, Scotland, directly north of the River Clyde. It is in an isolated location separated from the main urban area of the city and has the characteristics of a semi-rural village. Administratively, Carmyle falls under the Shettleston ward of Glasgow City Council.

== Early history ==
Carmyle as a place name, originally appears as a gift of the lands by Herbert, the Bishop of Glasgow (1147–1164) to the Cistercian Abbey of Neubotle (Newbattle, in Midlothian). This abbey had been established a few years previously by David I, whose mother, the saintly Margaret, Queen of Scotland and wife of king Malcolm III Ceanmore, had done so much to sow the seeds of Christianity in early Scotland.

The name Carmyle is derived from Cumbric and translates as "bare town". The reason for this may not be too difficult to find. Originally, most of the land north of Carmyle and Tollcross was forest and brushwood, giving excellent cover for wild animals, but the strips of land alongside the river banks were very rich for cultivating. Therefore, the lands in and around Carmyle were probably cleared at an early date, so as to give room for successful agriculture. "Bare town" would be quite appropriate in the circumstances. The village has within it a residence of the Verona Fathers, in the property once known as Carmyle House.

Following on its becoming an attribute of the church through Bishop Herbert, the district was confirmed to the monks from time to time by succeeding kings and popes. A note appended to the transcript of a papal bull, dated 1263, shows that the monks had ceased to be owners, for the time being. How the change occurred is explained in a charter granted by John Cheyam, Bishop of Glasgow, on 11 June 1268. It appears that the bishop had, with his own money and with the help of Sir Reginald of Irewyn, Archdeacon of Glasgow, purchased, or redeemed, the land of Kermil. Being zealous for the increase of divine service in Glasgow Cathedral, he dedicated the property (except the new mill which he had erected on the water of the Clyde) for sustenance of three chaplains or priests, to celebrate divine service in the cathedral for the souls of the predecessors and successors of Archdeacon Reginald. Bishop John's pious arrangement, however, seems to have been disregarded by Robert Wishart, the succeeding bishop. His interference led the dean and chapter to appeal to the Pope in 1275, for redress. The bishops of Dunblane and Argyle were commanded by the Pope to investigate the matter, but the outcome was never documented.

The district and village were known by various names, including Carmyld, Karmyle, Kermil, Neddyr Carmyle, Overe Carmyle and Wester Carmyled. The name Hutchesoune was applied to the district called Nether Carmyle, having been added in or about the year 1579, to the lands now owned by Thomas Hutcheson. His two sons were the founders of the hospital and school in Glasgow, bearing their name.

== Location ==
Due to its physical isolation from the main built-up areas of Glasgow, Carmyle has something of a rural village character as opposed to a neighbourhood in a city. The River Clyde runs directly to the south, opposite the Westburn neighbourhood of Cambuslang (South Lanarkshire) – the banks were previously connected for pedestrians by the Westburn Viaduct, a disused rail bridge, but that has now been blocked off. The Scottish Fire and Rescue Service National Training Centre (2013) and Clydesmill Community Fire Station (2011) are also on the southern bank of the river, on the site of the large Clydesmill Power Station which was present for most of the 20th century.

To the north, the closest parts of Glasgow (on the other side of railway lines and the M74 motorway) are Auchenshuggle, Foxley and Mount Vernon. There is a large industrial estate to the west of Carmyle (built on the site of the Clyde Iron Works, in operation from the late 18th to late 20th century).

Land to the east at Kenmuir is undeveloped, some being abandoned farmland and coal workings; the farm was known for its unconventional owner during the latter 20th century who had the farmhouse extended, but it was abandoned to become ruined a few yards south of the motorway after the owner lost a court case in relation to its construction. In the 2010s, plans were outlined for much of this land to be developed for housing as a 'Community Growth Area'.

== Transport ==
Carmyle railway station which opened in August 1866, closed in 1964 but then re-opened again in 1993, is on the Whifflet Line. It is an unstaffed, 2-platform halt. Trains run to Glasgow Central and Rutherglen from Westbound Platform 1, and to Mount Vernon, Baillieston, Bargeddie, Kirkwood and Whifflet from Eastbound Platform 2. The service is operated by ScotRail.

The village also has bus services to Glasgow city centre, The Forge Shopping Centre (Parkhead) and Cambuslang, although these are not among the main routes in the region.

The village is also close to the M74 motorway giving easy access to Scotland's central belt, the Scottish Borders and beyond. Construction on the extension project extending the M74 from Carmyle to Glasgow City Centre began in May 2008 and was completed in 2011.

== Leisure ==
Carmyle has one public house and two bowling greens. The Auld Boat Hoose, or "bottom shop" in River Road, opposite the spot where a boat would ferry people across the Clyde from the Cambuslang side. The former Auld Hoose, or "tap shop", round the corner, a few hundred yards up Carmyle Avenue, has since closed, been demolished, and its site been reoccupied by housing.

Carmyle Bowling Club is situated one hundred yards from the "bottom shop" and has been a member of the Glasgow and Scottish Bowling Associations since the 1960s. Foxley Bowling Club in Carmyle Avenue was instituted in 1914, taking its name from the local estate called Foxley. Several residents of Carmyle are members and a friendly rivalry exists between the two clubs.

== Walter Smith ==
Walter Smith, although born in Lanark, grew up in the Gardenside area of Carmyle. He went on to become one of the most successful managers in the history of Rangers F.C. across two spells in charge, and also managed the Scotland national football team.

== Clydeford Bridge ==
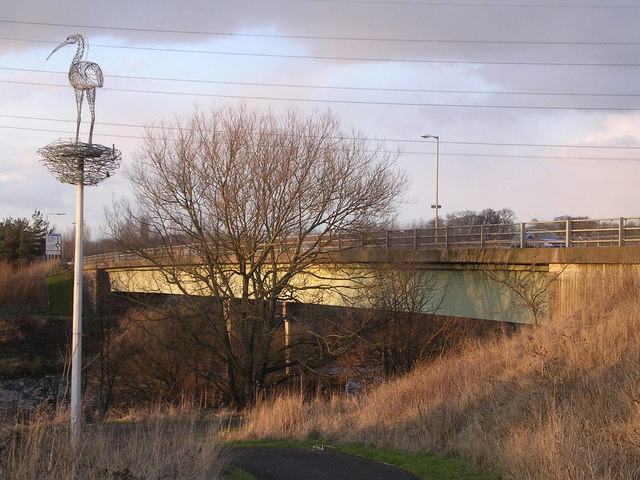
Clydeford bridge and Andy Scott's sculpture

Built in 1976, the Clydeford Bridge carries vehicles and pedestrians over the Clyde on the A763 road towards an industrial suburb on the site of the Clyde Iron Works, and towards the M74 motorway and A74 road. The bridge is located to the north-east of Cambuslang and the south-west of Carmyle. Its name derives from Clydeford Road which runs north from Cambuslang Main Street to the river, which was itself named after an ancient ford across the water at a nearby point. It was built to replace the Cambuslang Bridge (built 1892) located to the west – that bridge has never been demolished although it is closed to traffic.

On the south side of the Clydeford bridge at the Clyde Walkway and National Cycle Route 75 is a metallic wire sculpture of a wading bird created in 1998 by noted sculptor Andy Scott. It is known as the Carmyle Heron (although it is actually on the Cambuslang side of the river).
