= Clydebridge Steelworks =

Steel works in South Lanarkshire, Scotland

Coordinates: 55.832055°N 4.18552°W

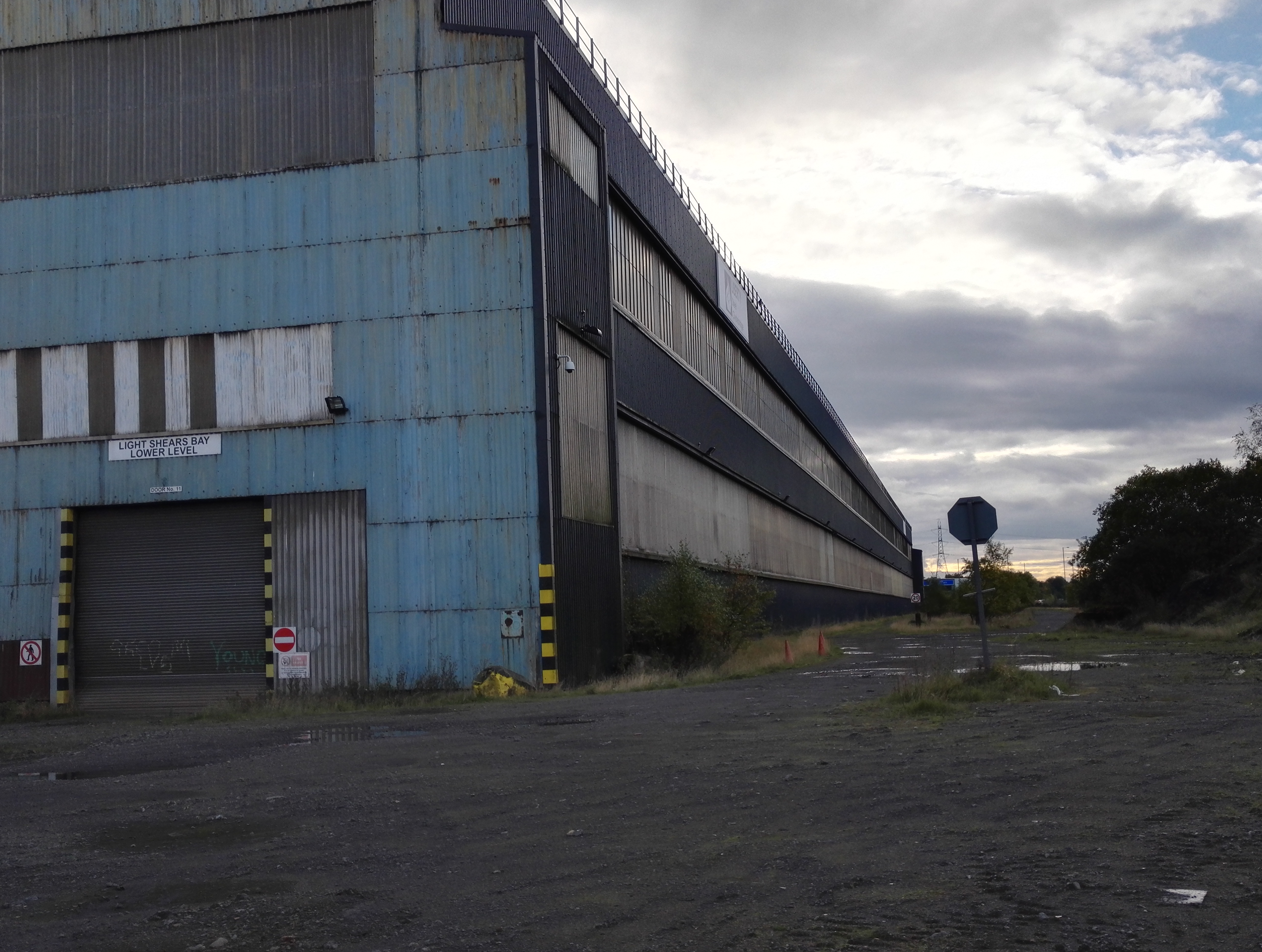
External view of largest existing building, 2016

The Clydebridge Steelworks, also known as Clydebridge Works, is a steel works in South Lanarkshire, Scotland.

The plant opened in 1877. The works made steel sheared plates to build ships (among other uses) - plates from Clydebridge were used in many famous vessels such as the ocean liners of the Cunard Line (Queen Elizabeth, Queen Mary and QE2).

Steel manufacture at the site ended in 1978; the site had manufactured steel with an open hearth furnace, the type of melting shops that British Steel wanted to discontinue. In the mid-1970s, it employed around 3,500. The plate mill at Clydebridge plate works rolled its last plate on 12 November 1982. The M74 motorway now runs through the works site adjacent to the remaining buildings.

As of 2016, it is currently owned by Liberty House Group and employs 45 workers in its heat treatment and quenching facilities. In late 2017, it appeared the future of the Clydebridge and Dalzell sites was again uncertain when Liberty offered redundancy packages to its workforce, but a few months later, Liberty Group owner Sanjeev Gupta announced a further "£1bn investment in Scotland" under his Greensteel production strategy.

== History ==
- 1887 – Clydebridge Steel Company opens as an independent private firm, managed by Walter and Hugh Neilson who are members of a family of Scottish ironmasters.
- 1907 - Closes due to an economic downturn.
- 1915 - Taken over by Colvilles to provide steel for World War I materials.
- 1917 – King George V visits; works double in size.
- 1920 - Clydebridge has 2000 employees.
- 1923 – A new plate mill is installed, among many other improvements making the works one of the most modern and efficient of the time.
- 1928 – The Prince of Wales (Edward VIII) visits.
- 1932 – The firm survives the Great Depression but output drops by up to half and staff numbers dip to their lowest at 507.
- 1938 – King George VI visits.
- 1939 – Clydebridge is linked to the Clyde Iron Works, becoming one of the largest integrated steelworks (producing both the hot metal and the finished steel) in the UK; a gas pipeline and railway bridge is constructed over the River Clyde which separated the two plants.
- 1951 – Works are nationalised as part of the Iron and Steel Corporation of Great Britain, this lasts until 1955 then ownership reverts to Colvilles.
- 1959 - Colvilles' new steelworks at Ravenscraig in Motherwell is completed.
- 1962 – Installation of 4-High Plate Mill and Heat Treatment & Quenching Plant sees works reach their maximum size.
- 1967 – Works again nationalised as part of British Steel Corporation.
- 1974 – Clydebridge has 2410 employees.
- 1977 - Clyde Iron Works and the Clydebridge melting shops (which had produced 20 million tonnes of steel in the preceding 90 years) closes, with hundreds of job losses.
- 1980 - Clydebridge workers (now numbering 800) take part in the steel strike from January to April.
- 1982 – The Plate Mill and Light Shearline are closed, making more unemployed - just 150 remain in a vastly downscaled operation.
- 1988 – British Steel is privatised; Clydebridge has 100 workers.
- 1999 – British Steel becomes Corus after a merger with Koninklijke Hoogovens, becoming the largest steel company in Europe. However at Clydebridge only a handful of workers remain going into the 21st century.
- 2006 – Tata Steel acquires Corus and renames it Tata Steel Europe
- 2011 – the M74 motorway extension through the site is completed.
- 2016 – Following a mothballing of the plant the previous year, Liberty House Group purchases Clydebridge (along with sister site Dalzell Works, the former Colville plant in Motherwell) with the promise of new life for the works through diversification of its products including the production of wind turbines.
- 2020 – Jahama Estates, part of the GFG Alliance group which also owns Liberty House, confirms plans to build a hotel on the eastern part of the unused ground at Clydebridge, with further development possibilities being considered for the site in the medium term.
- 2021 – hotel plans cancelled as Liberty Group struggles with substantial debts, a situation compounded by the collapse in productivity caused by the COVID-19 pandemic in Scotland.
- 2022 – winding-up petition issued for Liberty holding company.

== Geography ==
The secure site occupies a large parcel of land which is on a meander of the River Clyde, between the towns of Rutherglen and Cambuslang. The southern boundary is the Whifflet Line railway tracks (between Rutherglen and Carmyle). During the peak of activity at the works, several branches linked from the main lines into Clydebridge and to the Clyde Iron Works on the opposite bank of the river.

The works are approached via an access road under the railway at the southern side of the site (Bogleshole Road), near to Eastfield. Another vehicle entrance with a weighbridge at the west side of the site leading onto Cambuslang Road near Farme Cross is not in regular use – an asphalt concrete coating plant (Tillicountry Quarries Clydebridge) is located there. In the 2010s, the vicinity of this entrance consisted of several large warehouses, some of which were subsequently vacated and demolished in anticipation of the construction of a new retail development adjacent to the motorway junction. The project, named Two74, has faced delays in its planning process; by late 2019, the proposals included a large TopGolf driving range complex. which opened at the end of 2022.

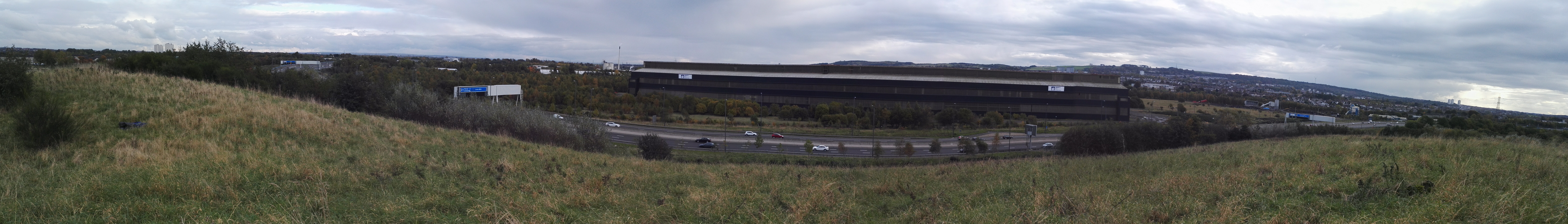
view looking south-east from the spoil mound over motorway and works buildings

The initial Clydebridge plant from 1887 was located in the south east of the territory directly beside the main line railway bridge. This site was chosen as it offered access to the railway, a source of water for cooling processes, a potential link to the river for transportation, had spare ground for waste products and future expansions, and was very close to the existing iron works producing the raw metal, and also near to numerous local collieries who provided the fuel for the furnaces. From around 1902 until 1962, trams and thereafter trolleybuses and buses also ran close to the works along Cambuslang Road in Rutherglen and along London Road (A74) to Auchenshuggle in eastern Glasgow, offering a public transport option for employees.

Following the Colvilles acquisition in 1915 the premises were upgraded, with new facilities further west directly alongside the railway. Additions were made to the works throughout the 1930s, 40s and 50s and another enlargement in the 1960s saw new buildings constructed to the north of the older workings.

With much of the obsolete works having been removed in the late 20th century, the most prominent of the remaining structures is the blue-coloured industrial shed housing the 4 high plate rolling mill and shears bay - at 330 metres (1,080 ft) long, 100 metres (330 ft) wide and 20 metres (66 ft) high, it is one of the largest structures in post-industrial Glasgow (Clydebridge is only around 3 miles from the city centre). The downscaled facility nowadays stands amidst an extensive area of brownfield woodland and scrub which conceals the railway sidings, industrial waste and debris of the demolished elements of the works.

=== Spoil Mound ===
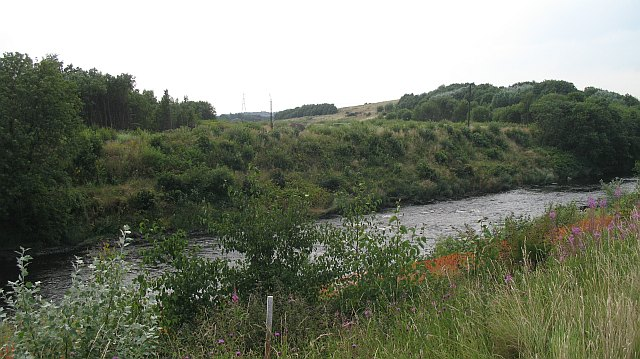
View across the river Clyde of the site of Auchenshuggle Bridge in 2008 - the buildings of Clydebridge are behind the trees on the left and the spoil mound can be seen rising on the right

The rubble of the older buildings was added to the spoil heap located in the north of the site bounded by the river Clyde. This large mound – around the same height as the plate mill shed - no longer serves any practical purpose following the closure of the ironworks and the downscaling of the steelworks, and has since been reclaimed by nature. It is possible to walk to the summit, which offers fine panoramic views over the south-east of Greater Glasgow, particularly Rutherglen and Braidfauld.

Since 2010 the mound has been separated from the rest of the works by the final section of the M74 motorway which runs through the middle of the site and is connected to the older section of the road by the Auchenshuggle Bridge over the Clyde. A footbridge under the motorway on the north bank of the river allows the Clyde Walkway and National Cycle Route 75 to continue, and a similar footbridge on the south bank connects the Clydebridge works to the mound area – a feasibility study was conducted in 2015 on creating a cycling and walking route which would run from Cambuslang to Farme Cross via this footbridge and past the mound, either adjacent to the river or to the motorway.

In 1992, Celtic F.C. released details of a plan to build a modern stadium on the site of Hamilton Farm, directly across the railway tracks from the steelworks. However this never materialised and the club redeveloped their existing facilities instead. Still vacant in 2015, the same site drew the attention of Scottish Cycling; their Clyde Cycle Park opened in 2021 with possibility of further expansion. Several modern distribution centres were constructed in the vicinity during the early 21st century to take advantage of the convenient location near the motorway.

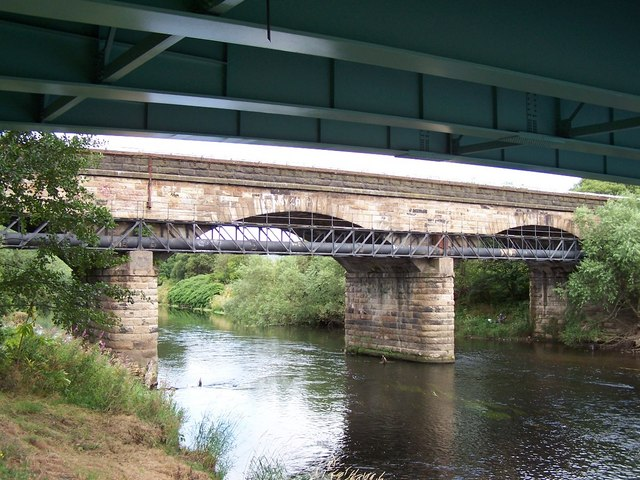
Clydebridge viaduct from west bank

=== Clydebridge Viaduct ===
The railway bridge over the river (known initially as Hamilton Farm Viaduct after the original farm nearby, but also referred to as Clydebridge Viaduct once that name became well known) was already in place prior to the establishment of the steel works - it was built as part of the Rutherglen and Coatbridge Railway, with the line completed in 1865. The bridge also incorporates a catwalk and water pipe on its south side, added during the period between the 1890s and 1930s when there were large industrial facilities on both sides of the river but no other crossing point for pedestrians (the closest alternative was Cambuslang Bridge over half a mile to the south of the viaduct). 200 metres (660 ft) further east, a steel bridge carries the railway lines over Fullarton Road, a short section of dual carriageway linking Bogleshole Road (see below) to the industrial parks on the Clyde Iron Works site, and to Junction 2A of the M74.

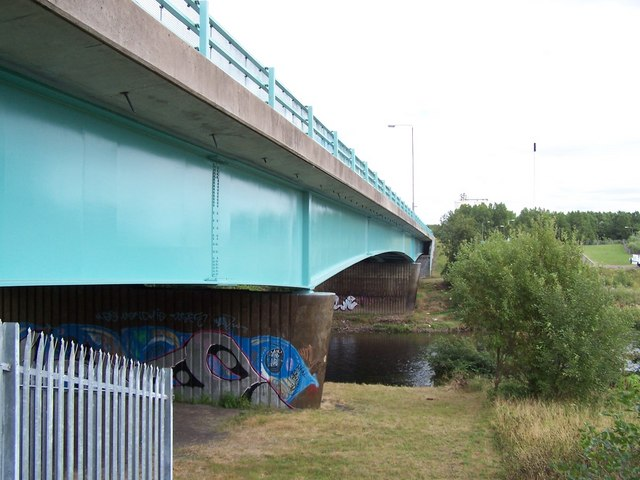
Bogleshole Road Bridge from west bank

=== Bogleshole Road Bridge ===
A road bridge was constructed to the south of the railway bridge in 1986, connecting Rutherglen directly to the motorway and Carmyle - previously, road traffic between these areas would need to go via Dalmarnock and London Road, or via the older bridge in Cambuslang (albeit a replacement for this had already been opened in 1976). Bogleshole Bridge was built near the site of an ancient ford of the same name across the river, and this was named after the Bogle family who owned much of the land on both banks of the river, from Hamilton Farm up to Daldowie estate.
