= Kirkwood railway station =

Railway station in North Lanarkshire, Scotland

Kirkwood Scottish Gaelic: Coille na Cille
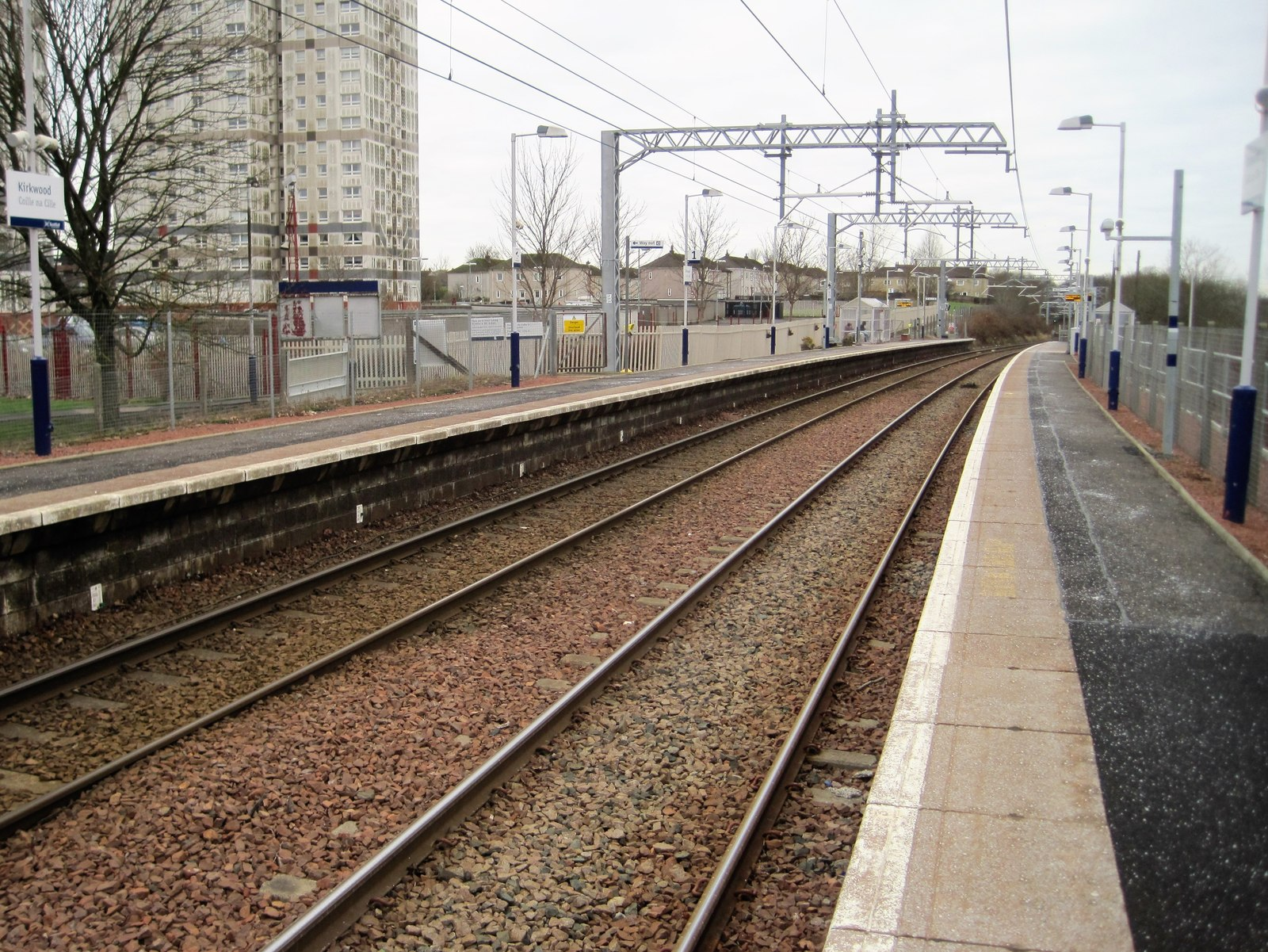
- Kirkwood railway station following electrification works

General information
- Location: Coatbridge, North Lanarkshire; Scotland
- Coordinates: 55.8542°N 4.0481°W
- Grid reference: NS718642
- Manager: ScotRail
- Platforms: 2

Other information
- Station code: KWD

History
- Opened: 1993

Passengers
- 2021/22: ▲72,844
- 2022/23: ▲94,068
- 2023/24: ▲0.122 million
- 2024/25: ▲0.136 million
- 2025/26: ▲0.137 million
Location
Notes
- Passenger statistics from the Office of Rail and Road

Kirkwood railway station is located in the Kirkwood area of Coatbridge, Scotland. It is on the Whifflet Line (a branch of the more extensive Argyle Line), 10 miles (16 km) east of Glasgow Central railway station. Train services are provided by ScotRail. The station was opened by British Rail in 1993, and is virtually on the site of the old Woodside Steel and Iron Works. It is located some 250 m (270 yd) west of the previous Langloan station, which was opened by the Rutherglen and Coatbridge Railway in August 1866 and closed when passenger trains over the line were withdrawn on 7 November 1966.

== Services ==
A half-hourly service operates between Glasgow Central and Whifflet stations, on Mondays to Saturdays. This formerly ran to/from Central High Level and was DMU operated, but now runs to Dalmuir via the Argyle Line. Alternate services continue south of Whifflet through to Motherwell.

Sunday services previously only ran for the month prior to Christmas and were extended to Shotts. However, since the December 2014 timetable change, they now run throughout the year. An hourly service runs in each direction, to Motherwell and Balloch via Glasgow Central Low Level.

Preceding station	National Rail	Following station
Whifflet	ScotRail; Argyle Line	Bargeddie
	Historical railways	
Langloan; Line open; station closed	Caledonian Railway; Rutherglen and Coatbridge Railway	Drumpark; Line and station open
