= Airdrie railway station (Caledonian Railway) =

Disused railway station in Airdrie, North Lanarkshire

Airdrie (CR)

General information
- Location: Airdrie, North Lanarkshire; Scotland
- Coordinates: 55.865679°N 3.977892°W
- Grid reference: NS762653
- Platforms: 2

Other information
- Status: Disused

History
- Original company: Caledonian Railway
- Pre-grouping: Caledonian Railway
- Post-grouping: London, Midland and Scottish Railway

Key dates
- 1 June 1886: Opened
- 1 January 1917: Services to Whifflet Upper withdrawn
- 1 March 1919: Services to Whifflet Upper resumed
- 3 May 1943: Closed
Location

Airdrie railway station, also known as Airdrie East railway station, served the town of Airdrie, North Lanarkshire, Scotland from 1886 to 1943 on the Airdrie to Newhouse Branch.

== History ==
The station opened on 1 June 1886 by the Caledonian Railway. To the south was a goods yard and to the southeast was a locomotive shed. Services to Whifflet Upper was withdrawn on 1 January 1917 but services to Newhouse continued. The services were reintroduced on 1 March 1919. The station closed on 3 May 1943.

| Preceding station | Disused railways | Following station |
|---|---|---|
| Terminus | Airdrie to Newhouse Branch | Calderbank; Line and station closed |
| Terminus | Rutherglen and Coatbridge Railway | Calder; Line and station closed |
