= Bargeddie railway station =

Railway station in North Lanarkshire, Scotland

Bargeddie Scottish Gaelic: Bàrr Geadaidh
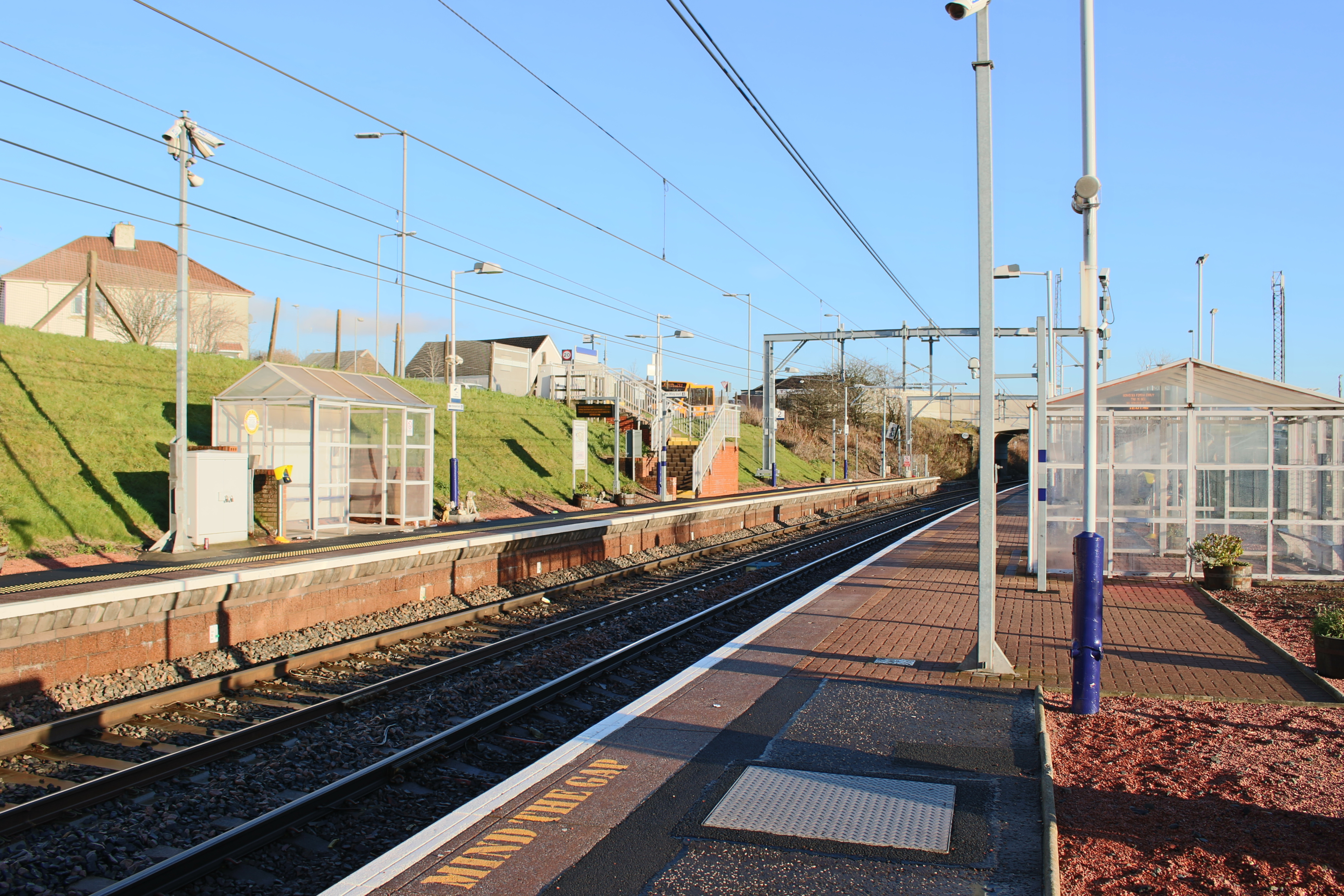
- Bargeddie in 2015, following electrification works

General information
- Location: Bargeddie, North Lanarkshire; Scotland
- Coordinates: 55.8513°N 4.0738°W
- Grid reference: NS702639
- Manager: ScotRail
- Platforms: 2

Other information
- Station code: BGI

Passengers
- 2021/22: ▲56,962
- 2022/23: ▲73,208
- 2023/24: ▲88,830
- 2024/25: ▲98,846
- 2025/26: ▲0.102 million
Location
Notes
- Passenger statistics from the Office of Rail and Road

Bargeddie railway station is located in the village of Bargeddie, North Lanarkshire, Scotland, situated between the city of Glasgow and the town of Coatbridge. It opened in 1993 under British Rail and SPTE, and is on the site of an earlier station called 'Drumpark'. It is on the Whifflet Line (a branch of the more extensive Argyle Line), 9¼ miles (15 km) east of Glasgow Central railway station. Train services are provided by ScotRail.

== Services ==
A half-hourly service operates between Glasgow Central (Low Level) and Whifflet stations, on Mondays to Saturdays. Westbound and Eastbound services run to and from Dalmuir and one train per hour each way extends to/from Motherwell.

Sunday services formerly only ran for the month prior to Christmas and were extended to Shotts, but since the December 2014 timetable change and the start of EMU operation now run hourly each way all day throughout the year (to Balloch and Motherwell).

Preceding station	National Rail	Following station
Kirkwood	ScotRail; Argyle Line	Baillieston
	Historical railways	
Langloan; Line open; station closed	Caledonian Railway; Rutherglen and Coatbridge Railway	Baillieston; Line open; station moved
