= Westburn Viaduct =

Disused railway viaduct in Glasgow, Scotland

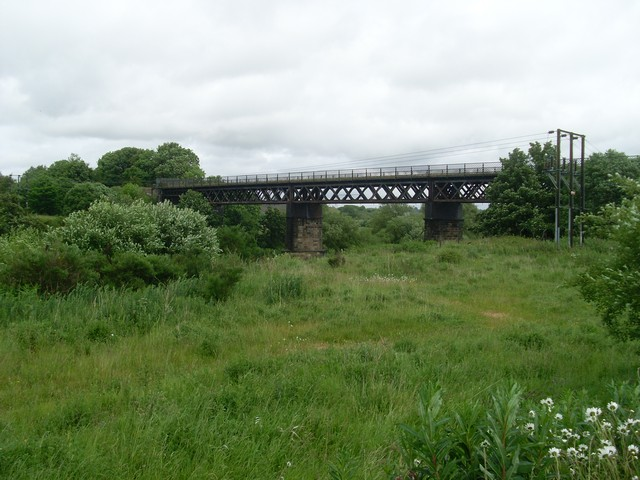
- View of the viaduct from the south bank
- Coordinates: 55.82817°N 4.14790°W
- Crosses: River Clyde
- Locale: Glasgow; South Lanarkshire
- Other name: Carmyle Viaduct

History
- Built: 1897
- Closed: 1983

Location
- Interactive map of Westburn Viaduct

Westburn Viaduct, also known as Carmyle Viaduct, is a disused railway bridge over the River Clyde between Carmyle in Glasgow (north side) and Westburn (Cambuslang) in South Lanarkshire (south side). It is constructed of a steel lattice frame with sandstone pillars and has three main spans over the water.

The bridge was constructed in 1897 as part of the Glasgow Central Railway between Carmyle and Newton stations and linked to the Rutherglen and Coatbridge Railway.

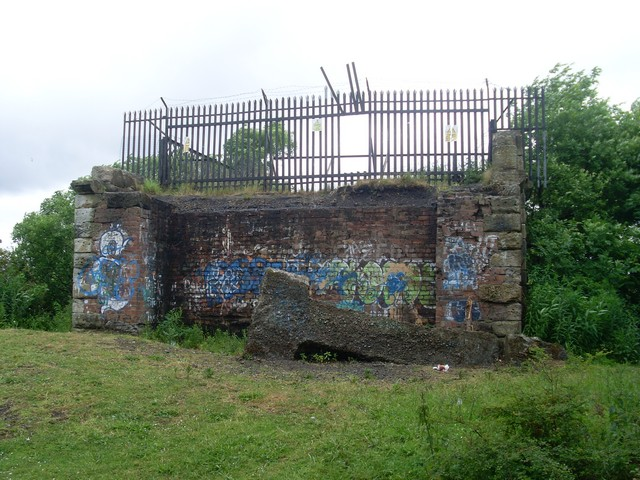
Fencing blocking off the bridge from the south bank (before the most recent effective fortifications were added)

A further connection towards Kirkhill on the Lanarkshire and Ayrshire Railway was made in 1904. The passenger train services using the bridge ended in 1964, although freight services, mostly serving Clydebridge Steelworks and Clyde Iron Works, continued until 1983 when those facilities ceased operating.

The bridge was officially closed and fenced-off, although for some years it was still accessible to pedestrians determined enough to overcome the barriers. After gang disorder involving youths from Westburn and Carmyle escalated into serious violence in 2012, the barriers were further reinforced to prevent the bridge being used by the youths to approach their rivals’ territory.

Between 2013 and 2015 a project to add illumination to the bridge developed with input by pupils from local schools (Bannerman HS, Trinity HS and Cathkin HS) in an effort to build bonds between the communities on either side of the bridge.

In early 2021, Sustrans Scotland announced a project to refurbish the bridge as a walking and cycling route across the river, inviting consultation from locals (with some residents on both sides objecting to the plans due to the recent history of violence associated with the route being accessible to rival youths).

== See also ==
- List of lattice girder bridges in the United Kingdom
- List of railway bridges and viaducts in the United Kingdom
