= Ainsworth Road Halt railway station =

Disused railway station in Radcliffe, Manchester

Coordinates: 53°34′20″N 2°20′20″W

Ainsworth Road Halt

General information
- Location: Radcliffe, Bury; England
- Grid reference: SD777084
- Platforms: 2

Other information
- Status: Disused

History
- Original company: Lancashire and Yorkshire Railway
- Pre-grouping: Lancashire and Yorkshire Railway
- Post-grouping: London Midland and Scottish Railway

Key dates
- 1 January 1918: Station opens
- 21 September 1953: Station closes
Location

Ainsworth Road Halt railway station was a railway station serving the northern part of Radcliffe, Greater Manchester, England.

== History ==
Opened by the Lancashire and Yorkshire Railway, it became part of the London Midland and Scottish Railway during the Grouping of 1923. The line then passed on to the London Midland Region of British Railways on nationalisation in 1948. It was then closed by the British Transport Commission.

Preceding station	Disused railways	Following station
Bradley Fold	London Midland and Scottish Railway; Lancashire and Yorkshire Railway	Withins Lane
Bradley Fold	London Midland and Scottish Railway; Lancashire and Yorkshire Railway	Radcliffe Central

== The site today ==
Ainsworth Road crosses the site as it did when the station operated. The west side of the road is open space and the east side the course of a new road.

The site of the railway station is shown on the map and marked Halt. A few hundred yards to the north on Ainsworth Road (B6292) is the site of the station known as Radcliffe Black Lane which had a much more extensive service. A visitor to the site of Ainsworth Road Halt today will be able to note the remains of the bridge that carried the road over the railway. On the west side of the road sections of bridge masonry are visible as is the parapet beam. At the end of the stone abutment on the northern part of the bridge, a brick infill marks the entrance to one of the platforms, which was accessed by a narrow path leading down into the cutting. On the east side of the road all of the bridge construction above road level has been removed.
