= Calder railway station =

Disused railway station in Coatbridge, North Lanarkshire

Calder

General information
- Location: Coatbridge, North Lanarkshire; Scotland
- Coordinates: 55.8569°N 4.0075°W
- Grid reference: NS744644
- Platforms: 2

Other information
- Status: Disused

History
- Original company: Caledonian Railway
- Pre-grouping: Caledonian Railway
- Post-grouping: London, Midland and Scottish Railway

Key dates
- 1 June 1886: Opened
- 1 January 1917: Closed
- 1 March 1919: Reopened
- 3 May 1943: Closed permanently
Location

Calder railway station served the town of Coatbridge, North Lanarkshire, Scotland from 1886 to 1943 on the Rutherglen and Coatbridge Railway.

== History ==
The station opened on 1 June 1886 by the Caledonian Railway. It had a goods yard that was served by a siding to the west. This siding also served Union Tube Works. The station closed on 1 January 1917 but reopened on 1 March 1919, before closing permanently on 3 May 1943.

Preceding station	Disused railways	Following station
Airdrie (CR); Line and station closed	Edinburgh and Glasgow Railway	Whifflet Upper; Line and station closed
