= Bradley Fold =

Coordinates: 53.572°N 2.366°W

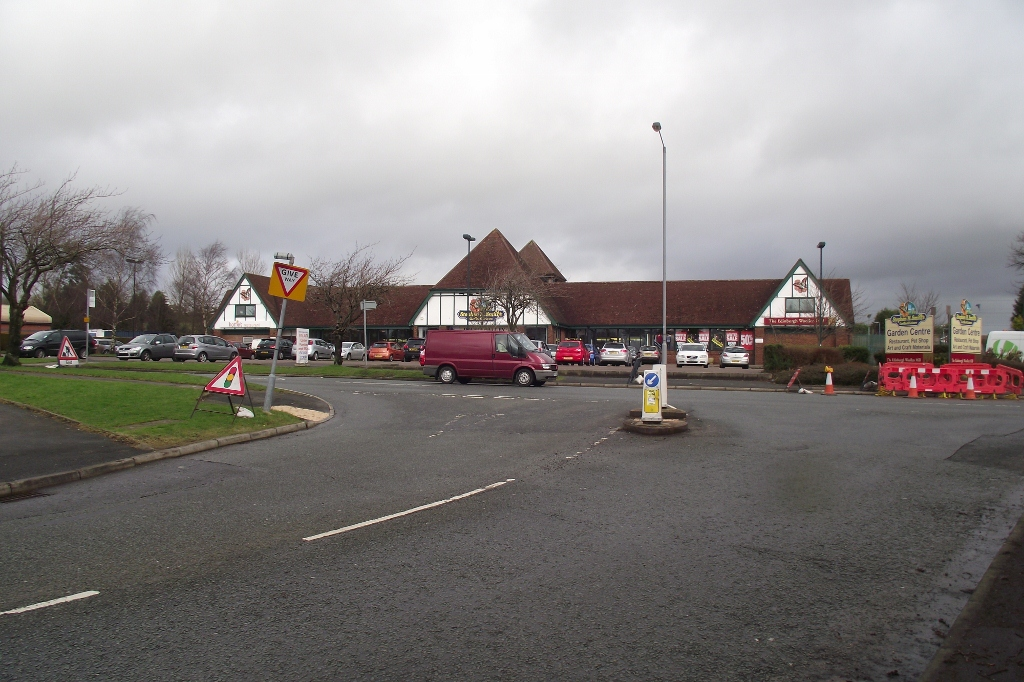
- Garden centre at Bradley Fold

- Location within Greater Manchester
- OS grid reference: SD757083
- Metropolitan borough: Bury
- Metropolitan county: Greater Manchester
- Region: North West
- Country: England
- Sovereign state: United Kingdom
- Post town: BOLTON
- Postcode district: BL2
- Dialling code: 01204
- Police: Greater Manchester
- Fire: Greater Manchester
- Ambulance: North West
- UK Parliament: Bury North

Bradley Fold is a small district within the Metropolitan Borough of Bury, in Greater Manchester, England. It lies midway between Bolton and Bury, approximately 3 miles from each. It forms part of the Radcliffe North ward on Bury Council, and sits within the Bury North parliamentary constituency, after changing from Bury South in the 2024 general election. Despite coming within Bury Council's governance, Bradley Fold residents have Bolton postal addresses and telephone numbers.

Bradley Fold has a trading estate, incorporating a council depot, and is also home to a former Dorma textiles factory. Since the mid-1990s, several new housing estates have been built. There are reservoirs open to anglers on Browns Road. In addition to a garden centre and social club, Bradley Fold has one pub, The Queens, where remnants of the former Bradley Fold railway station on the Liverpool and Bury Railway can be seen.
