= Auchenshuggle Bridge =

Bridge in Glasgow, Scotland

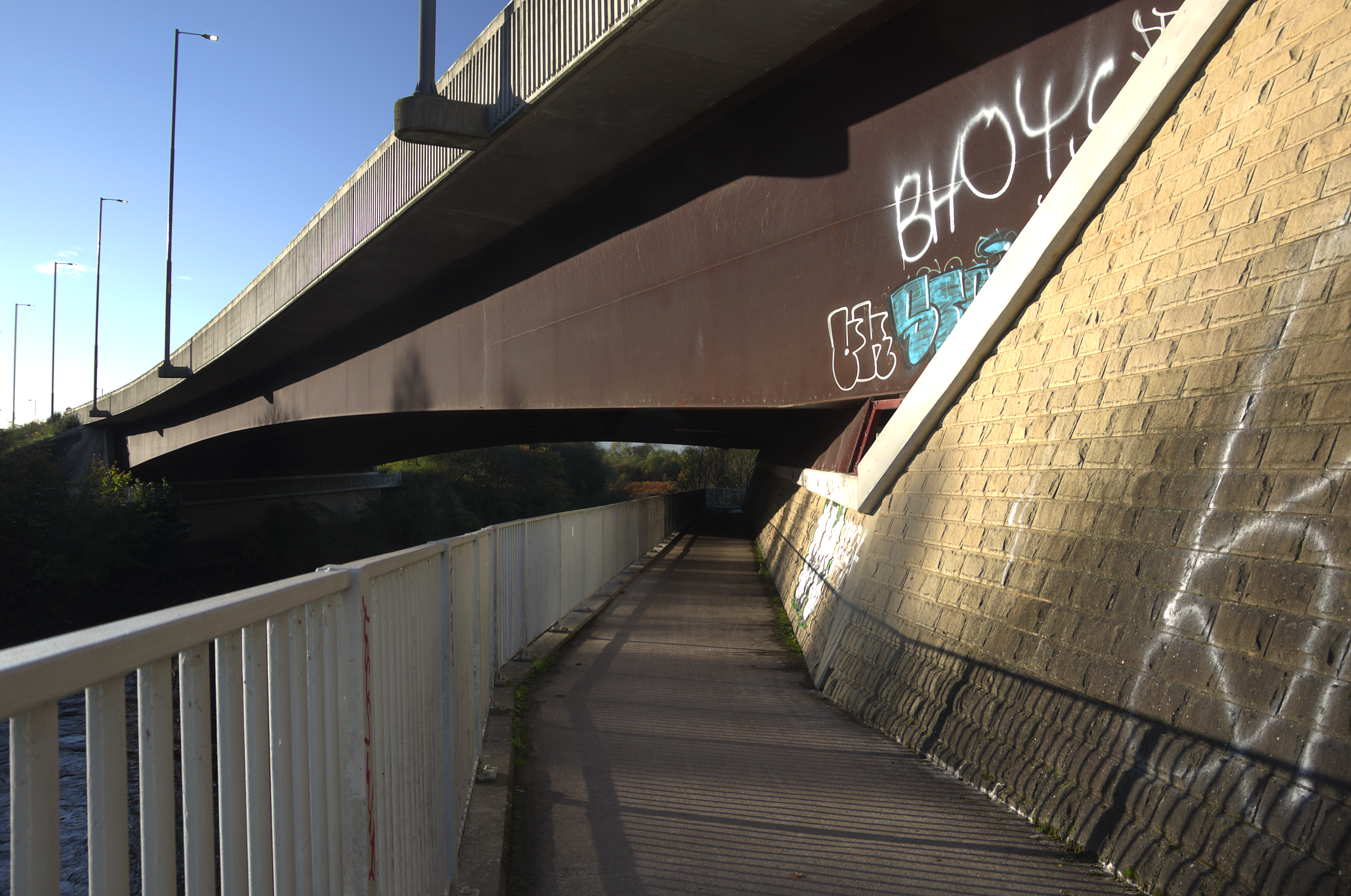
- Auchenshuggle bridge from Clyde Walkway
- Coordinates: 55.8358°N 4.18135°W
- Carries: M74
- Crosses: River Clyde
- Locale: Glasgow / South Lanarkshire

History
- Opened: 2011

Location
- Interactive map of Auchenshuggle Bridge

Auchenshuggle Bridge (Achadh an t-Seagail - "the rye field" - in Gaelic) is a road bridge spanning the River Clyde in Glasgow, Scotland. The Auchenshuggle Bridge is the latest road bridge to be built over the Clyde in the Auchenshuggle district of Glasgow, carrying the M74 motorway over the river and onto land which is part of Clydebridge Steelworks in Rutherglen, en route to the M8 junction near the heavily congested Kingston Bridge.

== History ==
The Bridge was built as part of the northern extension of the M74, being the southern flank of the never completed Glasgow Inner Ring Road, although following a different route through the southside of the city.

The aim of the motorway extension was to relieve the heavily congested northern section of the M8 through the city centre and over the Kingston Bridge by allowing through traffic to bypass the entire city centre section of the M8, via the M74.

== Construction ==
The Auchenshuggle bridge is a dual three-lane motorway bridge that carries both carriageways of the M74 over the River Clyde, located west of Fullarton Road junction. The single-span bridge is supported at each end by reinforced concrete supports, and the bridge deck (superstructure) is made up of steel box girder beams with reinforced concrete cast in place over the beams.

During construction of the bridge, engineers used the Europe's largest mobile crane to lift the superstructure into place.

The new bridge was completed and opened in 2011. Its construction incorporates a footbridge under the motorway on the north bank of the river which allows the Clyde Walkway and National Cycle Route 75 to continue, as well as an identical footbridge on the south bank which would also accommodate any similar pathways built in the future, as was mooted in 2015.

== See also ==
- List of bridges in Scotland
