= List of lattice girder bridges in the United Kingdom =

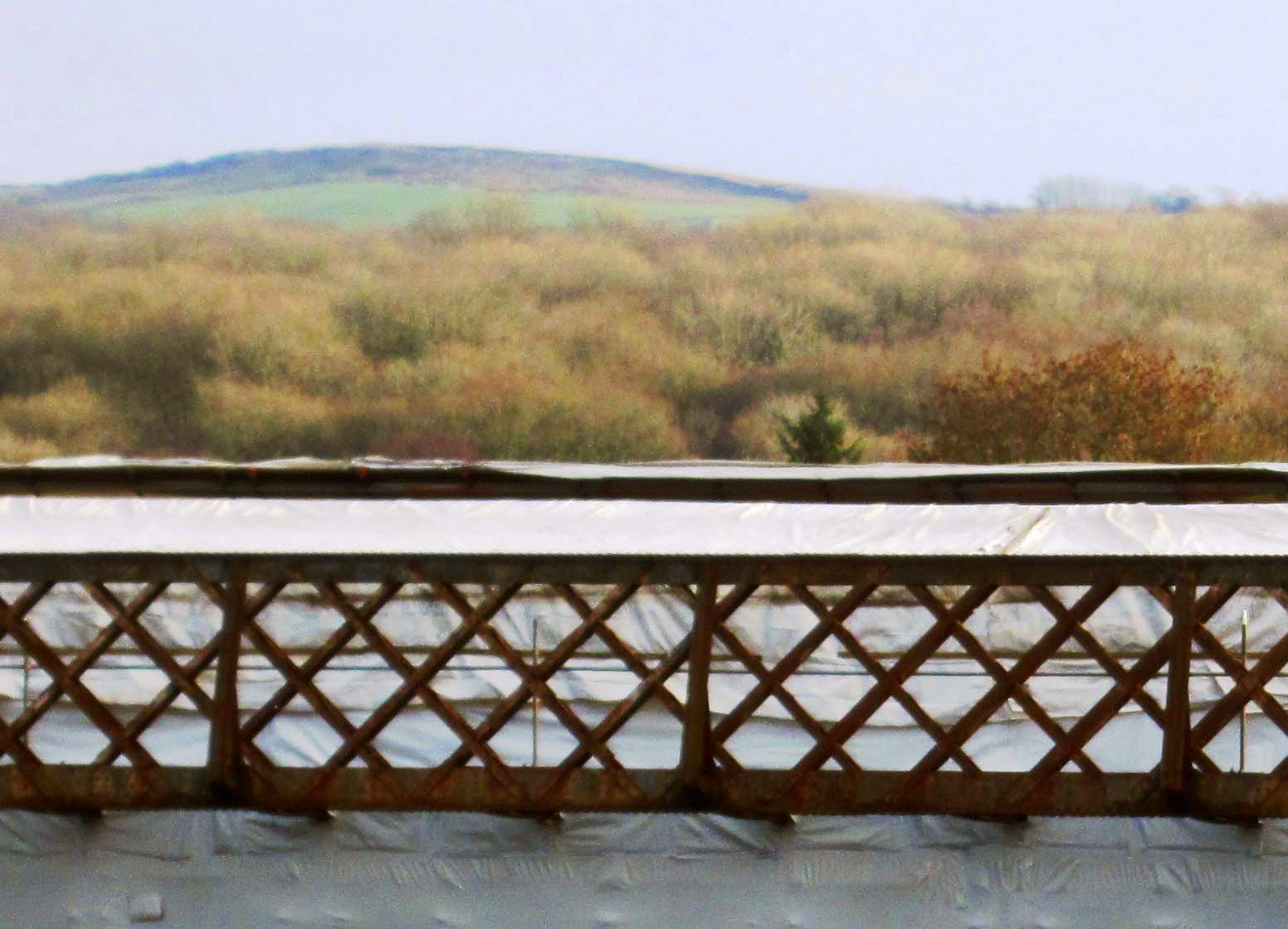

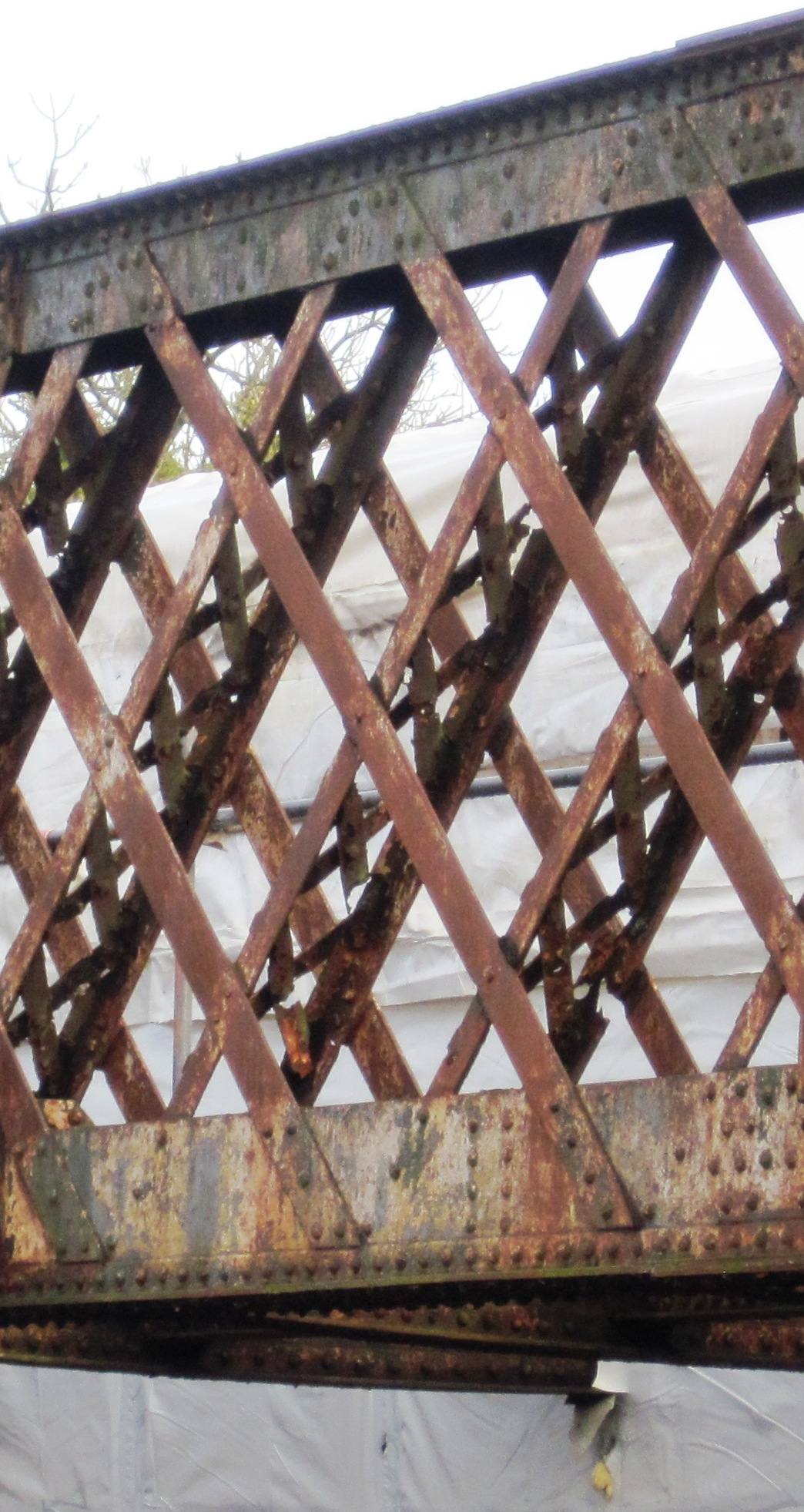

This list is intended to help identify a particular early form of lattice girder bridge which was popular with bridge engineers particularly in the United Kingdom in the latter half of the 19th century.

The term "lattice girder", is used in the UK and "lattice truss" is more widely used in the USA. A lattice girder or truss is often defined only in two dimensions, that is (in the case of a bridge) the structure as seen from the side. Such definitions sufficed for the early lattice girders such as the US Town truss which was designed for construction in timber. Early iron structures using a Town-type lattice replicated this appearance, leading to the instantly recognisable lattice-work shown in the bridges in Part A of this list. However, design considerations required that an iron (as opposed to a wooden) structure required many of the latticed bars to be stiffened in the third dimension. Thus, on closer examination, the delicate appearance of these early iron lattices is belied by this much more complex stiffening in the thickness or third dimension. This complex stiffening is itself also sometimes described as a ‘lattice girder’, being composed of (typically) two or four parallel flat or angled steel bars, closely spaced but linked by lattice work. Such a member is better described as a "laced strut", and such members frequently form a significant part of a lattice girder. The use of laced struts within a lattice girder can be seen in the two photographs of the c1860s lattice girder bridge at Llandeilo.

The first table lists these early examples. (Note that some bridges, for example the New Clyde Viaduct (or Second Caledonian Bridge) in Glasgow, appear to be of lattice construction whereas in fact the latticing is used solely for the protective parapet.)

In later forms, various developments took place: for example, the lattice became less dense and each individual diagonal thus much more substantial; vertical members were introduced; and eventually both diagonal and vertical members achieved cross-sectional dimensions comparable to those of the main top and bottom components, thus forming what is more commonly known as a truss.

The second table lists these later developments.

== Bridges with dense latticing constructed from flat iron bars or angles ==
Bridges with dense latticing constructed from flat iron bars or angles
Name	Date of construction	Notes	Image
Bennerley Viaduct	1877	One of only two iron trestle bridges still in situ in the UK.	Bennerley Viaduct photographed from Nottingham Canal Towpath in 2006
Kew Railway Bridge	1869		Kew Railway Bridge
Runcorn Railway Bridge	1868	Also known as Ethelfleda Bridge or Britannia Bridge. Carries the Liverpool branch of the West Coast Main Line over the River Mersey and the Manchester Ship Canal.	Runcorn Railway Bridge with Silver Jubilee Bridge behind
Marton Junction Bridge	1851		
Darcy Lever Railway Bridge	1848	Rebuilt in 1883, but it is thought that the original girders were used.	Darcy Lever Bridge
Cadishead Viaduct	1892		Cadishead Viaduct, bridging the Manchester Ship Canal west of Manchester
Fulham Railway Bridge	1889		Fulham Railway Bridge
Wandsworth Bridge	1873	Replaced by the current bridge in 1937	The first Wandsworth Bridge
Cornbrook Viaduct (Castlefield)	1877		Cornbrook Viaduct is the upper bridge, it lies just behind the lower bridge in the foreground
Great Northern Viaduct (Castlefield)	1894		The Viaduct and Potato Wharf
Llandeilo Railway Bridge	1852		Llandeilo bridge carries the Heart of Wales railway over the River Towy
Partick Railway Bridge	1900		Partick Bridge over the River Kelvin
Westburn Viaduct	1897		Westburn Viaduct (also known as Carmyle Viaduct), over the River Clyde, disused and blocked off
Burntisland	1888		The easternmost spans of Burntisland Viaduct looking towards the harbour
Irlam Viaduct	1873		Irlam Viaduct over the Manchester Ship Canal
Monk Bridge			Bridge carrying Whitehall Road over the River Aire
Sheffield District Railway Bridge, Brightside	1900		Disused railway bridge over the River Don
Logierait Bridge	1865		Logierait Bridge over the River Tay
Warmsworth Viaduct	1910		Warmsworth Viaduct over the River Don
Pont Goed Bridge, Pentre Berw, Isle of Anglesey	1867		
Halkirk Bridge	1874		Town lattice girder bridge on Far North Railway near Halkirk, Caithness
Kinbrace Railway Bridge	1874		Bridge over River Helmsdale, Kinbrace, Highland Region
Darwen Street Bridge, Blackburn	1847		
Wishaw Railway Bridge	1849		
Gallowgate Railway Bridge	1870		
Oykel Viaduct, Invershin	1868		
Sainsbury's Bridge, Bath	1870		The apparent 'roof' covers the modern footbridge adjacent to and immediately behind the railway bridge
Waterloo Railway Bridge	1864		Lattice girder bridge carrying railway tracks from Waterloo east towards Hungerford Bridge
Oxford Gasworks Bridge	1882		Old railway bridge, used as a footpath since the gasworks closed in 1960
Llangefni Railway Bridge	1866		
Bowshank Railway Bridge	1849		
Brixton Railway Bridge	1867		
Rochester Railway Bridge	1891		
Coatbridge Railway Bridge	1898		
Montrose Viaduct	1880	The end span (see photo) is a conventional Town-type lattice. However, the bulk of this long viaduct consists of longer spans each of which has been strengthened by adding a small degree of upward curvature to the upper horizontals. This makes this structure a unique example of a Town-type bowstring lattice.	
Bath Station Railway Bridge	1878		
Dolemeads Bridge, Bath			
Croxley Green Railway Bridge	1912		
River Trent Bridge, Melbourne, Derbyshire	1868		
Dutch River Bridge, Goole	1848		
Fortyfoot Bridge, Lincolnshire	1882		
Wick River Bridge, Sibster, Caithness	1874		
Broadford Bridge, near Guildford, Surrey			
Cragganmore Railway Bridge	1863		
Crow Road Railway Bridge (1), Glasgow	1885	Estimated date of construction. Railways in this part of Glasgow were opened in the mid-1880s.	
Crow Road Railway Bridge (2), Glasgow	1885	Estimated date of construction. Railways in this part of Glasgow were opened in the mid-1880s.	
Burnham Road Railway Bridge, Scotstoun, Glasgow	1907		

== Bridges with simpler use of diagonal and vertical members ==
Bridges with simpler use of diagonal and vertical members
Name	Date of construction	Notes	Image
Dowery Dell Viaduct	1883	A rare example of a lattice girder superstructure supported on trestles. Built by the Halesowen Joint Railway. Demolished 1964.	Dowery Dell Viaduct with steam train
Hungerford Bridge	1864		Hungerford Bridge - looking from the footbridge towards the rail bridge
Wicker Viaduct	1848		Viaduct over the River Don, Sheffield

== See also ==
- List of railway bridges and viaducts in the United Kingdom
