= Chapelhall railway station =

Disused railway station in Chapelhall, North Lanarkshire

Coordinates: 55.8435°N 3.9503°W

Chapelhall

General information
- Location: Chapelhall, North Lanarkshire; Scotland
- Platforms: 2

Other information
- Status: Disused

History
- Original company: Caledonian Railway
- Pre-grouping: Caledonian Railway
- Post-grouping: London, Midland and Scottish Railway

Key dates
- 1 September 1887: Opened
- 1 December 1930: Closed
Location

Chapelhall railway station served the village of Chapelhall, North Lanarkshire, Scotland from 1887 to 1930 on the Airdrie to Newhouse Branch.

== History ==
The station opened at 07:00 by the Caledonian Railway. To the west was the goods yard and to the north of the southbound platform was the signal box. There were sidings to the northwest that served Chapelhall Iron Works and carried on to Calderbank. The station closed at 23:15.

Preceding station	Disused railways	Following station
Calderbank; Line and station closed	Airdrie to Newhouse Branch	Newhouse; Line and station closed
