= Calderbank railway station =

Disused railway station in Calderbank, North Lanarkshire

Coordinates: 55.8475°N 3.9648°W

Calderbank

General information
- Location: Calderbank, North Lanarkshire; Scotland
- Platforms: 2

Other information
- Status: Disused

History
- Original company: Caledonian Railway
- Pre-grouping: Caledonian Railway
- Post-grouping: London, Midland and Scottish Railway

Key dates
- 1 September 1887: Opened
- 1 December 1930: Closed
Location

Calderbank railway station served the village of Calderbank, North Lanarkshire, Scotland, from 1887 to 1930 on the Airdrie to Newhouse Branch.

== History ==
The station was opened on 1 September 1887 by the Caledonian Railway. To the south was a goods yard and to the northeast was a signal box called 'Calderbank Station'. The station closed on 1 December 1930.

Preceding station	Disused railways	Following station
Airdrie (CR); Line and station closed	Airdrie to Newhouse Branch	Chapelhall; Line and station closed
