= Whifflet Upper railway station =

Disused railway station in Whifflet, North Lanarkshire

Coordinates: 55.8560°N 4.0219°W

Whifflet Upper

General information
- Location: Whifflet, North Lanarkshire; Scotland
- Platforms: 1

Other information
- Status: Disused

History
- Original company: Caledonian Railway
- Pre-grouping: Caledonian Railway
- Post-grouping: London, Midland and Scottish Railway; British Railways (Scottish Region)

Key dates
- 1 June 1886: Opened as Whifflet High Level
- 1 January 1917: Closed
- 1 March 1919: Reopened
- 7 November 1953: Name changed to Whifflet Upper
- 5 October 1964: Closed
Location

Whifflet Upper railway station served the village of Whifflet, North Lanarkshire, Scotland from 1886 to 1964 on the Rutherglen and Coatbridge Railway.

== History ==
The station opened as Whifflet High Level on 1 June 1886 by the Caledonian Railway. To the southeast was Whifflet High Level signal box. The station closed on 1 January 1917 but reopened in March 1919. The station's name was changed to Whifflet Upper on 7 November 1953. It closed on 5 October 1964.

Preceding station	Disused railways	Following station
Calder; Line and station closed	Rutherglen and Coatbridge Railway	Langloan; Line and station closed
