= Darcy Lever railway station =

Former railway station in England

Coordinates: 53.571057°N 2.408433°W

Darcy Lever
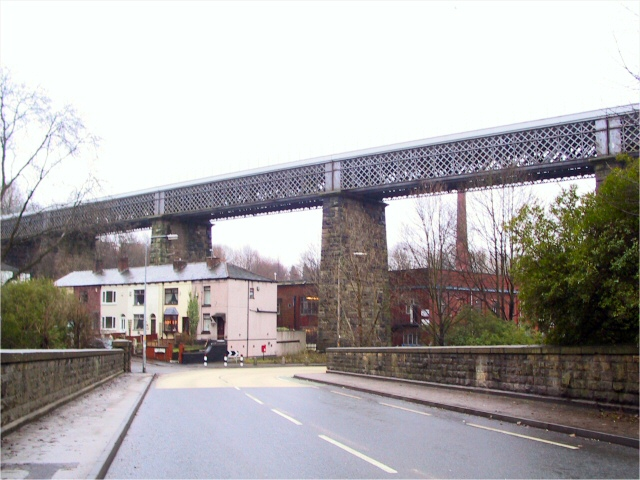
- Darcy Lever viaduct, seen from the north-west

General information
- Location: Darcy Lever, Bolton; England
- Grid reference: SD730083

Other information
- Status: Disused

History
- Original company: Liverpool & Bury Railway
- Pre-grouping: Lancashire and Yorkshire Railway
- Post-grouping: London, Midland and Scottish Railway

Key dates
- 20 November 1848: Station opened
- 29 October 1951: Station closed
Location

Darcy Lever railway station served the Darcy Lever area of eastern Bolton between 1848 and 1951.

== History ==
The station opened on 20 November 1848. It was on the Bury–Bolton section of the Liverpool & Bury Railway, which opened on the same day.

To the east of the station, the valley of the River Tonge is crossed by Darcy Lever viaduct, which is 86 feet (26 m) high. It has eight spans supported by stone piers: two spans are 54 ft (16 m) long, and six are 84 ft (26 m) long. Each consists of six lattice girders: two 14-foot-deep girders (4.3 m), which also form the parapets, flanking four which are 10 feet (3.0 m) deep. This viaduct, together with a shorter one of similar construction on the same line (over the River Croal at Burnden) was claimed by the Bolton Chronicle (18 November 1848) to be "the first of their kind in England".

The station closed on 29 October 1951.

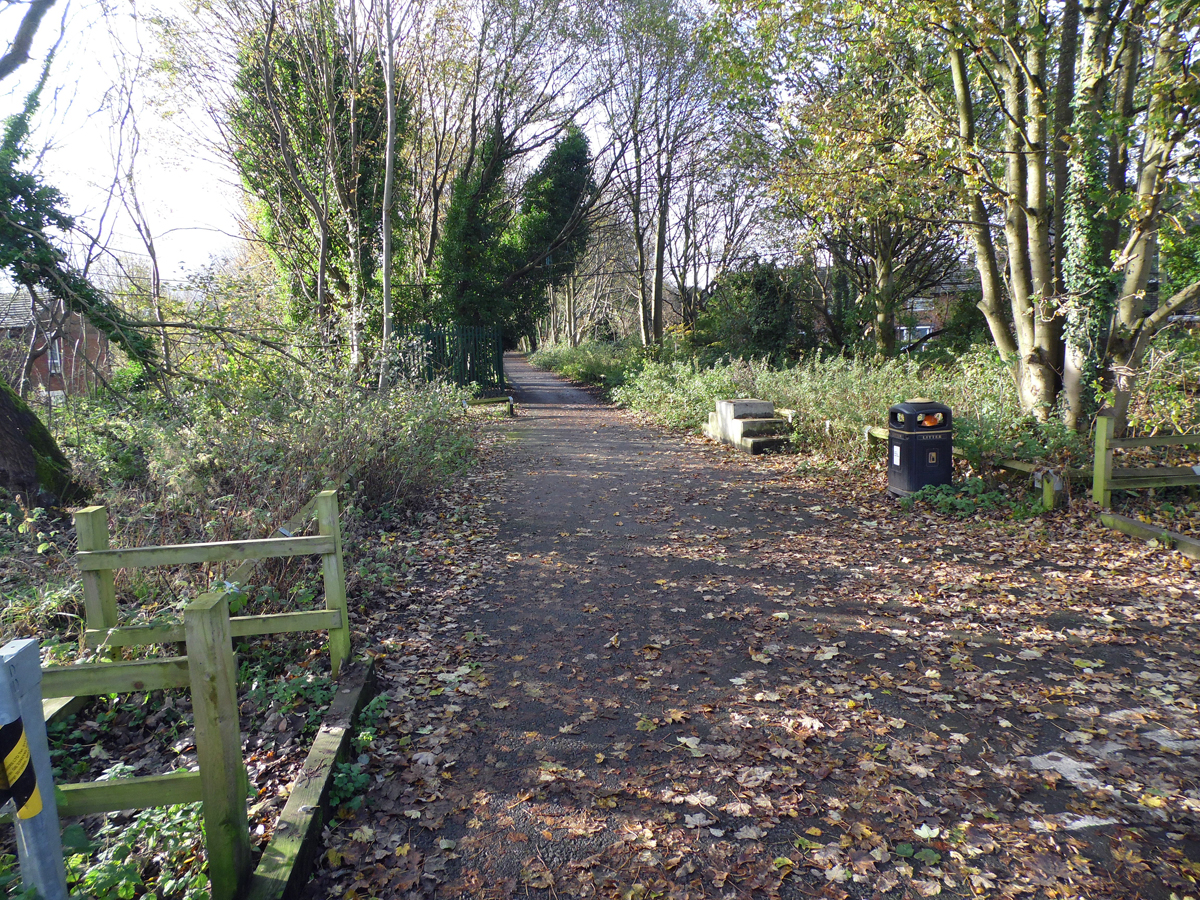
Site of Darcy Lever Railway Station

== See also ==
- List of lattice girder bridges in the United Kingdom

Preceding station	Disused railways	Following station
Bolton; Line closed, station open	Lancashire and Yorkshire Railway; Liverpool & Bury Railway	Bradley Fold; Line and station closed
