= Carmyle railway station =

Railway station in Glasgow, Scotland

Carmyle Scottish Gaelic: Cair Maol
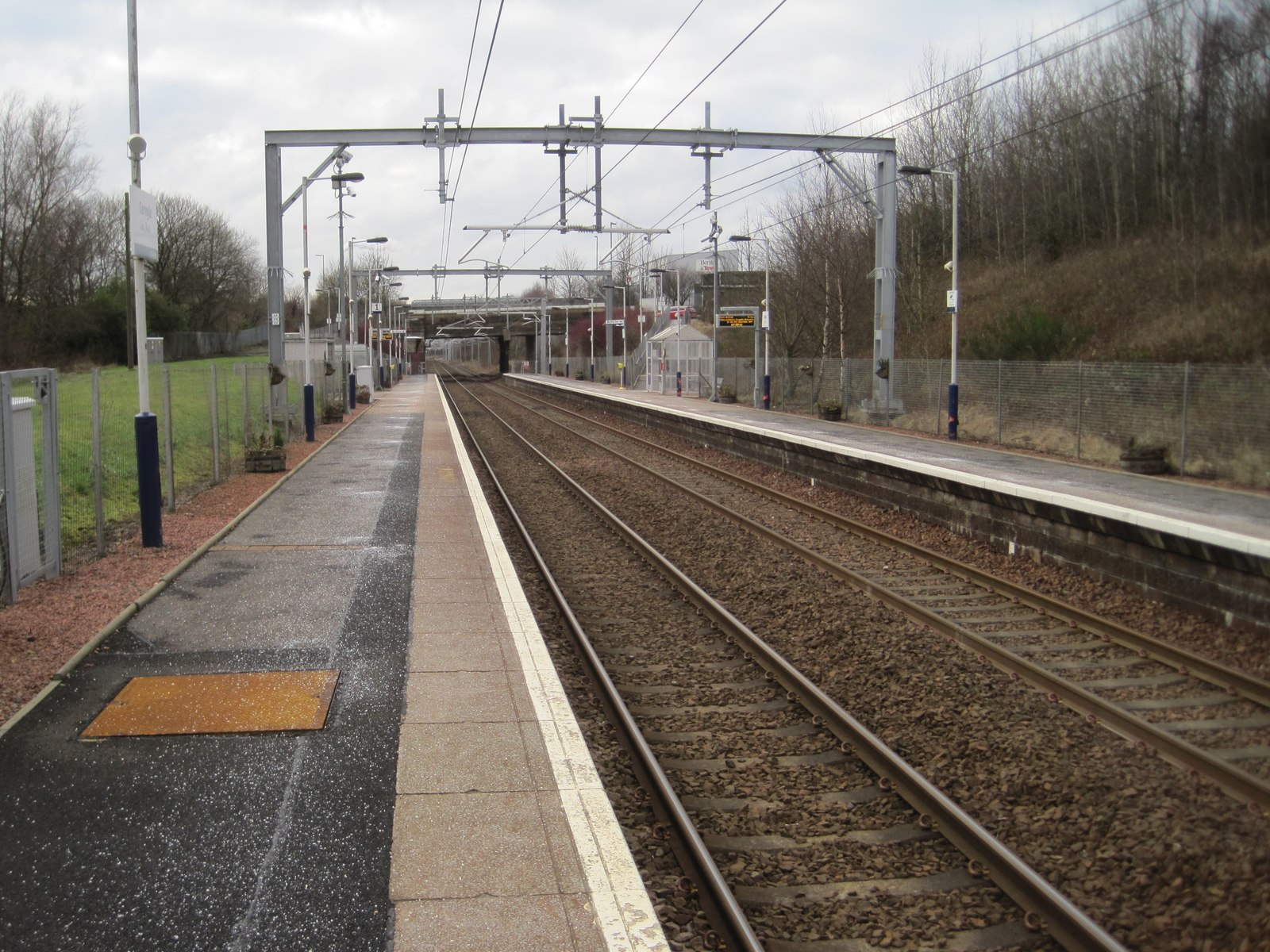
- The station in 2017, following electrification

General information
- Location: Carmyle, Glasgow; Scotland
- Coordinates: 55.8343°N 4.1581°W
- Grid reference: NS649622
- Manager: ScotRail
- Platforms: 2

Other information
- Station code: CML

History
- Original company: Rutherglen and Coatbridge Railway
- Pre-grouping: Caledonian Railway
- Post-grouping: LMS

Key dates
- 1 August 1866: Opened
- 1897: Glasgow Central Railway services commence
- 5 October 1964: Closed
- 4 October 1993: Re-opened

Passengers
- 2021/22: ▲82,270
- 2022/23: ▲92,446
- 2023/24: ▲0.122 million
- 2024/25: ▲0.130 million
- 2025/26: ▲0.132 million
Location
Notes
- Passenger statistics from the Office of Rail and Road

Carmyle railway station is located in the Carmyle area of Glasgow. It is on the Whifflet Line (a branch of the more extensive Argyle Line), 5.5 miles (8.9 km) east of Glasgow Central railway station. Services are provided by ScotRail. The station lacks any ticket purchasing facilities, and passengers must purchase one before travel at another station, online or onboard the train.

== History ==
Carmyle station was opened in 1866 by the Rutherglen and Coatbridge Railway on their route between Coatbridge and Glasgow. The line had originally been commissioned in 1865, but for goods traffic only - passenger services started on 1 August the following year, with Carmyle opening on that date.

Thirty years later it became a junction, upon the opening of the Glasgow Central Railway route from Bridgeton (then known as Bridgeton Cross) in 1897. This intersected the older route at the station, before continuing southwards to join the Lanarkshire and Ayrshire Railway at a triangular junction between Kirkhill and Newton via Westburn Viaduct. This route gave access to the low level platforms at Glasgow Central and thence to the northwestern suburbs via Anderston and Maryhill Central.

Both lines were operated from the outset (and eventually taken over) by the Caledonian Railway, before passing to the London, Midland and Scottish Railway at the 1923 Grouping. They then became part of the Scottish Region of British Railways upon nationalisation in January 1948.

The Glasgow Central Railway line and platforms closed to passengers on 5 October 1964 as a result of the Beeching Axe. The GCR route was subsequently dismantled and few traces of it remain today (the old platforms were demolished when the M74 motorway extension was built), but the line from Rutherglen was retained for freight traffic (mainly to/from the Ravenscraig steelworks) and periodic passenger diversions. It was then reopened as the Whifflet Line with financial backing from the Strathclyde Passenger Transport Executive in 1993, with Carmyle regaining its passenger service on 4 October that year by British Rail. It was the first station stop on the reopened line after leaving the main line station at Glasgow Central, as the main line platforms at Rutherglen (which the original R&CR had served) had been closed following the reopening of the Argyle Line in 1979.

Electrification of the route through the station was completed in December 2014, which was not in time for the Glasgow Commonwealth Games as originally planned. The old Diesel Multiple Unit service from Central High Level has been replaced by EMUs running via Rutherglen and the Argyle Line. This has seen the restoration of the link to Central Low Level and beyond originally lost back in 1964.

== Services ==
A half-hourly service operates to and from Dalmuir via Glasgow Central Low Level through to Whifflet on Mondays to Saturdays. Every second train is extended to/from Motherwell. On Sundays there is now an hourly service between Motherwell and Balloch that calls in each direction (prior to the December 2014 timetable alterations Sunday services only ran for the month prior to Christmas and were extended to/from Shotts).

Preceding station	National Rail	Following station
Mount Vernon	ScotRail; Whifflet Line	Rutherglen
	Historical railways	
Broomhouse; Line and station open	Caledonian Railway; Rutherglen and Coatbridge Railway	Rutherglen; Line open and station partially open
Newton; Line closed; station open on other routes	Caledonian Railway; Glasgow Central Railway	Tollcross; Line and station closed
Kirkhill; Line closed; station open on other routes	Caledonian Railway; Glasgow Central Railway and Lanarkshire and Ayrshire Railway	Tollcross; Line and station closed
