= Bradley Fold railway station =

Disused railway station in England

Bradley Fold
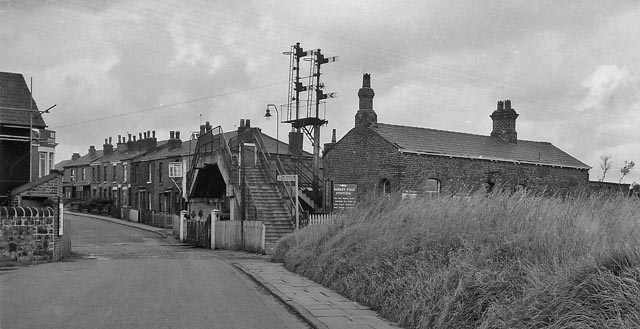
- Bradley Fold station in 1963

General information
- Location: Bradley Fold, Bury; England
- Coordinates: 53.571357°N 2.367237°W
- Grid reference: SD758083
- Platforms: 2

Other information
- Status: Disused

History
- Original company: Lancashire and Yorkshire Railway
- Pre-grouping: Lancashire and Yorkshire Railway
- Post-grouping: London, Midland and Scottish Railway; London Midland Region of British Railways

Key dates
- January 1849: Opened as Bradley Fold
- April 1921: Renamed Bradley Fold for Little Lever
- 5 October 1970: Closed
Location

Bradley Fold railway station served Bradley Fold and Little Lever from 1849 to 1970 on the now closed line between Bury and Bolton.

The Lancashire and Yorkshire Railway (L&YR) opened its line through the station site on 20 November 1848. However the station, in common with others on the line, did not open then. The station was shown in the December 1848 timetable, but with no trains stopping there. The first trains to stop at the station did so from January 1849. (Note: The line had been planned by the Liverpool & Bury Railway (L&BR) who gained Parliamentary approval to construct it. The L&BR was acquired by the Manchester and Leeds Railway in 1846 which in turn changed its name to the Lancashire and Yorkshire Railway (L&YR) in 1847.)

The station was located where Bradley lane crossed the railway via a level crossing, the station building was to the north of the line and east of the road. By 1850 a siding was provided to the south of the station to access Tonge Lane Colliery, the siding had access to the line in both directions using a 'Y' junction, there was no map evidence of other facilities.

In 1870 a correspondent writing to the Bolton Chronicle described the station's facilities as

First, then, allow me to say that the cabin, which serves for first, second, and third-class waiting room, booking office, telegraph office, parcel office, office for the goods clerk, and lamp room, occupies a space of about twelve feet by nine feet, at one side of which is a form which will hold about six persons, The platform on the other side of the line is so barren that it cannot boast even a slab shed to shelter passengers from the inclemency of the weather. The wood cabin which serves for all the purposes named above, and some others occasionally, was erected some twenty years ago, and to all it will have to re- main other twenty years longer.

The station became a junction when the Lancashire and Yorkshire Railway (L&YR) opened its Prestwich branch line from a junction to the east of the station to Radcliffe South Junction (just south of Radcliffe New railway station) on 1 December 1879.

By 1894 the station was listed as having passenger and goods facilities including a 5 ton crane, the Ordnance Survey map showing one siding to the south of the line. By 1910 the siding to the colliery had closed, there were several more siding shown to the south of the line. The road still crossed the railway via a level crossing but a footbridge had been provided adjacent to the road.

The station was renamed Bradley Fold for Little Lever in April 1921.

The station closed to goods traffic on 1 August 1963 and completely on 5 October 1970.

Preceding station	Disused railways	Following station
Darcy Lever	Lancashire & Yorkshire Railway	Radcliffe Black Lane (Liverpool and Bury line)
Darcy Lever	Lancashire & Yorkshire Railway	Ainsworth Road Halt (Prestwich branch)

== Bibliography ==
- Clinker, C. R. (October 1978). Clinker's Register of Closed Passenger Stations and Goods Depots in England, Scotland and Wales 1830–1977. Bristol: Avon-Anglia Publications & Services. ISBN 0-905466-19-5. OCLC 5726624.
- Oliver, Henry; Airey, John (1894). Hand-book and Appendix of Stations, Junctions, Sidings, Collieries, &c., on the Railways in United Kingdom.
- Grant, Donald J. (2017). Directory of the Railway Companies of Great Britain (1st ed.). Kibworth Beauchamp, Leicestershire: Troubador Publishing Ltd. ISBN 978-1-78803-768-6.
- Marshall, John (1970). The Lancashire & Yorkshire Railway. Vol. 2. Newton Abbot: David & Charles. ISBN 978-0-7153-4906-9.
- Quick, Michael (2023) [2001]. Railway passenger stations in Great Britain: a chronology (PDF). version 5.05. Railway & Canal Historical Society.
