= Mount Vernon railway station =

Railway station in Glasgow, Scotland

Mount Vernon
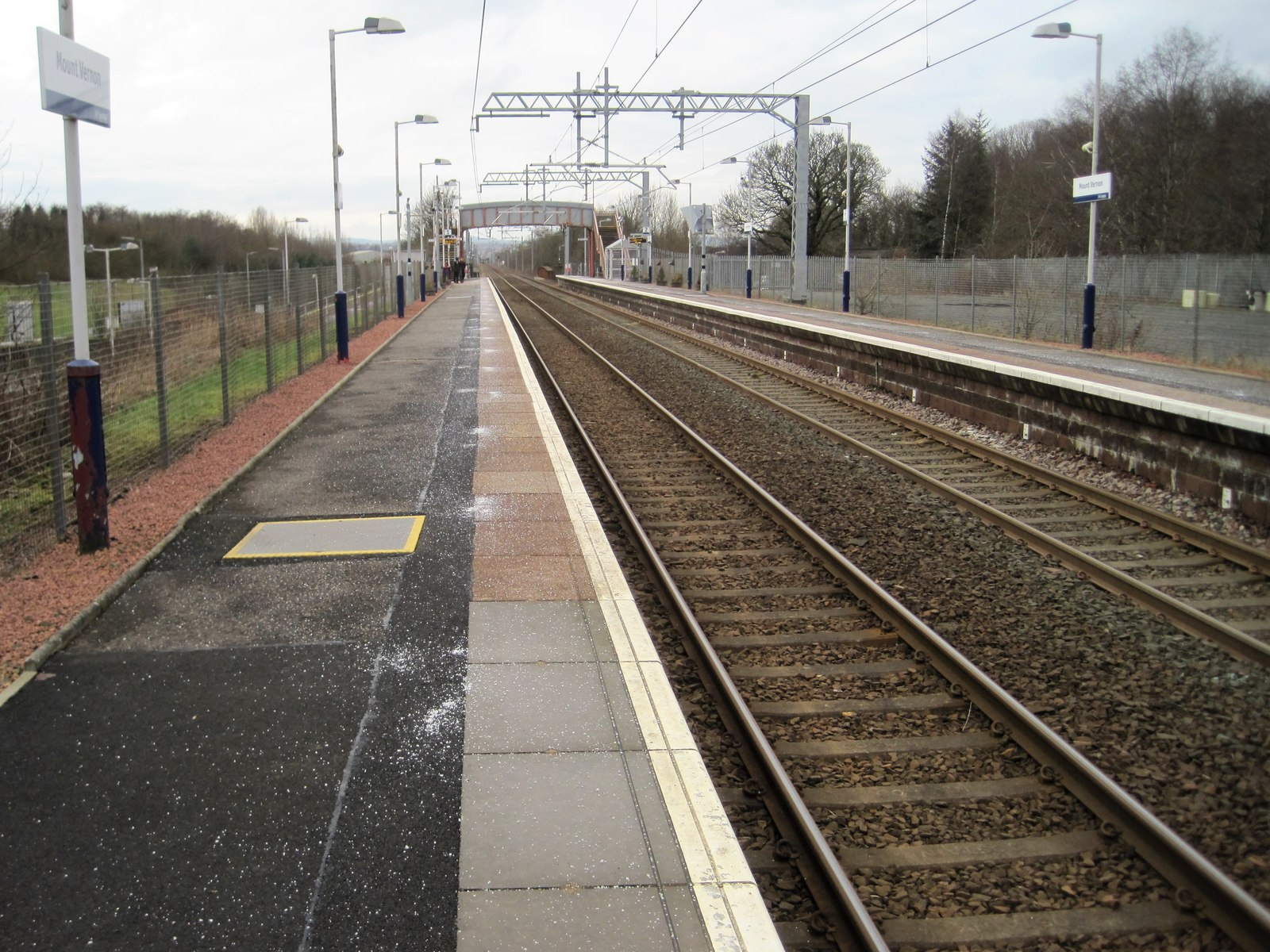
- Mount Vernon in 2017, following electrification

General information
- Location: Mount Vernon, Glasgow; Scotland
- Coordinates: 55.8405°N 4.1326°W
- Grid reference: NS665628
- Manager: ScotRail
- Transit authority: SPT
- Platforms: 2

Other information
- Station code: MTV

History
- Original company: Rutherglen and Coatbridge Railway
- Pre-grouping: Caledonian Railway
- Post-grouping: LMS

Key dates
- 8 January 1866: Opened
- 16 August 1943: Closed
- 4 October 1993: Re-opened

Passengers
- 2021/22: ▲33,444
- 2022/23: ▲44,158
- 2023/24: ▲60,072
- 2024/25: ▲63,544
- 2025/26: ▲63,822
Location
Notes
- Passenger statistics from the Office of Rail and Road

Mount Vernon railway station is a railway station located in the Mount Vernon area of Glasgow, Scotland. It is on the Whifflet Line (a branch of the more extensive Argyle Line), 6 3/4 miles (10.9 km) east of Glasgow Central. Train services are provided by ScotRail.

== History ==
The Rutherglen and Coatbridge Railway opened a station on this site in 1866. It was closed to passengers in 1943, although the line through it remained open for passenger services until 1966. It was rebuilt and reopened as Mount Vernon on 4 October 1993 by British Rail.

== Services ==
=== From 1993 ===
Following the electrification of the line in 2014, a half-hourly service has operated to and from Dalmuir on Mondays to Saturdays. One train per hour each way is extended to/from Motherwell. There is also an all-year hourly service each way on Sundays for the first time since the line reopened in 1993 (Sunday services had previously operated only on the four weeks up to Christmas for shoppers). Prior to electrification, the service was operated by Class 156s and 158s, and ran to/from Glasgow Central High Level.

Preceding station	National Rail	Following station
Baillieston	ScotRail; Argyle Line	Carmyle
	Historical railways	
Baillieston	Rutherglen and Coatbridge Railway; Caledonian Railway	Carmyle
