= Newhouse railway station =

Disused railway station in Newhouse, North Lanarkshire

Newhouse
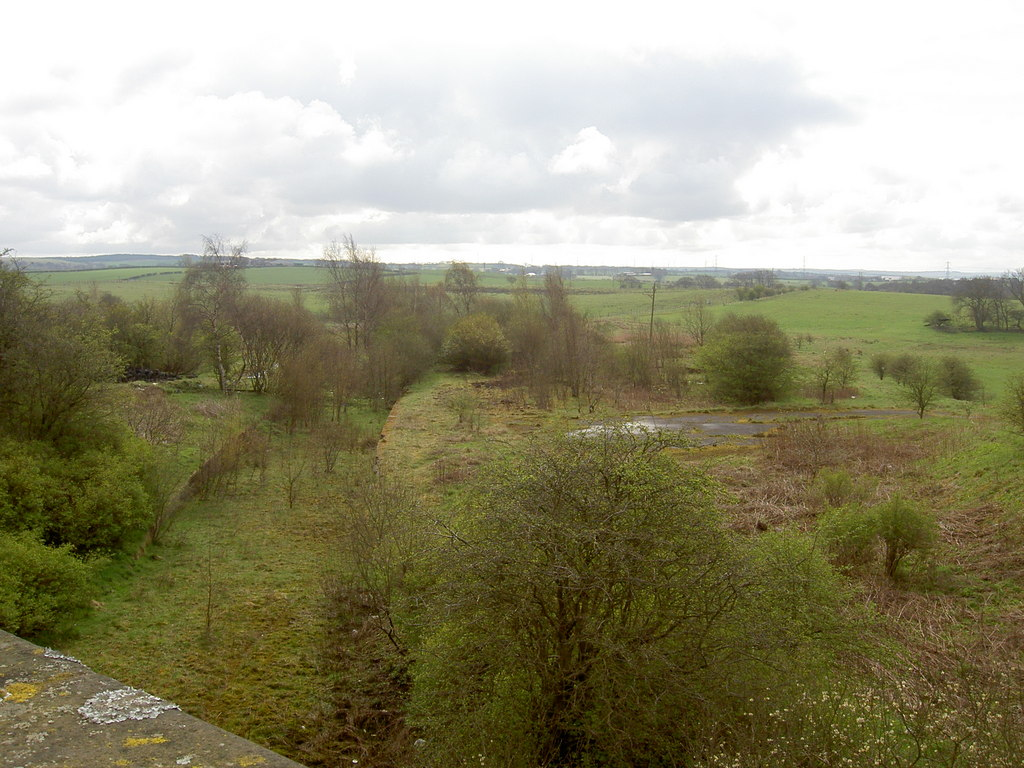
- The site of the station in 2008

General information
- Location: Newhouse, North Lanarkshire; Scotland
- Coordinates: 55.8316°N 3.927°W
- Grid reference: NS794615
- Platforms: 2

Other information
- Status: Disused

History
- Original company: Caledonian Railway
- Pre-grouping: Caledonian Railway
- Post-grouping: London, Midland and Scottish Railway

Key dates
- 2 July 1888: Opened
- 1 December 1930: Closed
Location

Newhouse railway station served the hamlet of Newhouse, North Lanarkshire, Scotland from 1888 to 1930 on the Airdrie to Newhouse Branch.

== History ==
The station opened on 2 July 1888 by the Caledonian Railway. To the southeast was the goods yard and to the south of the northbound platform was the signal box, which closed in 1922. The station closed on 1 December 1930.

Preceding station	Disused railways	Following station
Chapelhall; Line and station closed	Airdrie to Newhouse Branch	Terminus
