= Langloan railway station =

Disused railway station in Langloan, North Lanarkshire

Langloan
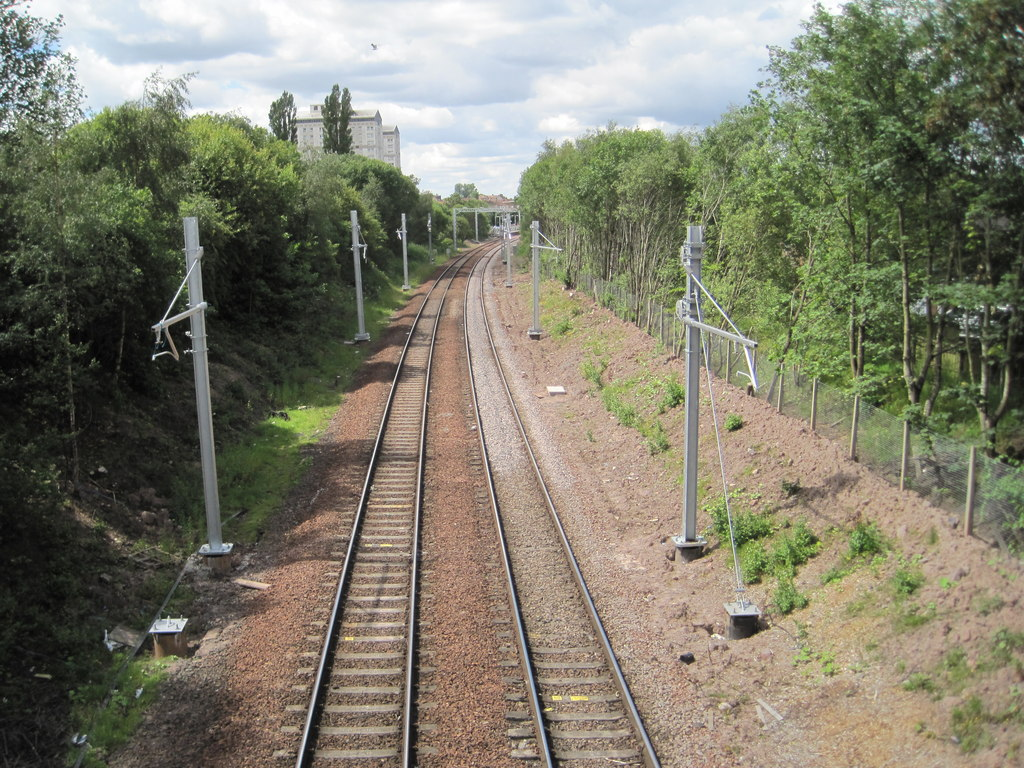
- The site of the station, looking east towards Kirkwood, in 2014

General information
- Location: Langloan, North Lanarkshire; Scotland
- Coordinates: 55.8538°N 4.0426°W
- Grid reference: NS722641
- Platforms: 2

Other information
- Status: Disused

History
- Original company: Caledonian Railway
- Pre-grouping: Caledonian Railway
- Post-grouping: London, Midland and Scottish Railway; British Rail (Scottish Region)

Key dates
- 8 January 1866: Opened
- 5 October 1964: Closed
Location

Langloan railway station served the suburb of Langloan, North Lanarkshire, Scotland from 1866 from 1964 on the Rutherglen and Coatbridge Railway.

== History ==
The station opened on 8 January 1866 by the Caledonian Railway. To the west was the Langloan Weights signal box and to the north was the goods yard. The station closed on 5 October 1964.

Preceding station	Disused railways	Following station
Whifflet Upper; Line open, station closed	Rutherglen and Coatbridge Railway	Baillieston; Line and station open
