= Baillieston railway station =

Railway station in Glasgow, Scotland

Baillieston
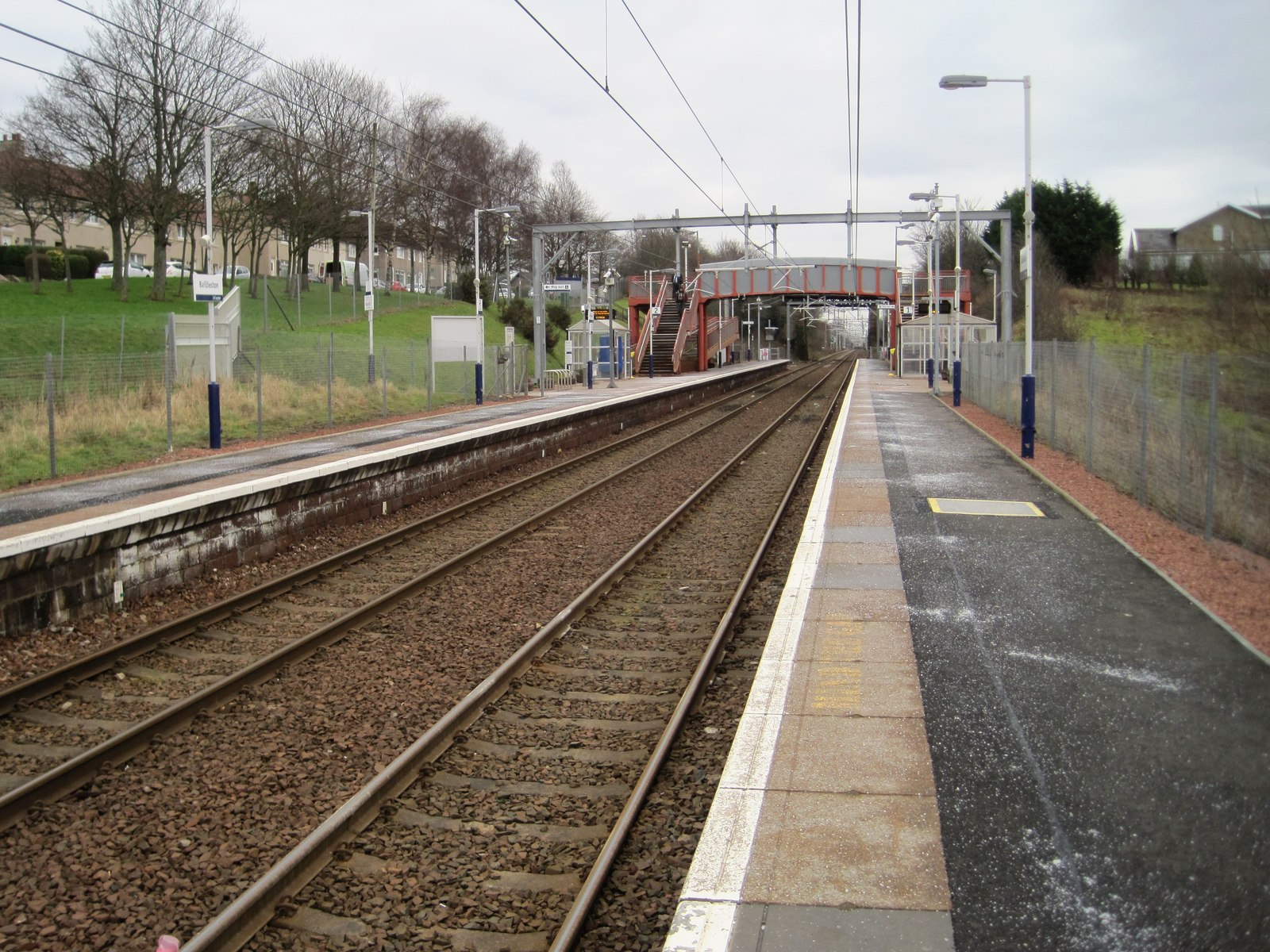
- Baillieston in 2017, following electrification

General information
- Location: Baillieston, Glasgow; Scotland
- Coordinates: 55.8445°N 4.1137°W
- Grid reference: NS677632
- Manager: ScotRail
- Platforms: 2

Other information
- Station code: BIO

Key dates
- 8 January 1866: First station opened
- 5 October 1964: First station closed
- 4 October 1993: Second station opened

Passengers
- 2021/22: ▲93,060
- 2022/23: ▲0.117 million
- 2023/24: ▲0.155 million
- 2024/25: ▲0.162 million
- 2025/26: ▲0.163 million
Location
Notes
- Passenger statistics from the Office of Rail and Road

Baillieston railway station is located in Caledonia Road on the southern boundary of the Baillieston area of Glasgow, Scotland, with the Broomhouse area on the other side of the tracks. It is on the Whifflet Line (a branch of the more extensive Argyle Line), 8 miles (13 km) east of Glasgow Central. Train services are provided by ScotRail.

The line was built in the period 1864–1866 by the Caledonian Railway and was called the Rutherglen to Coatbridge branch. The new station opened by British Rail on 4 October 1993 under the financial management of the Strathclyde PTE.

== History ==
The original station, which was situated 1 km (1,100 yd) east of the present, was opened by the Caledonian Railway in January 1866 when passenger traffic started. The line became part of the London, Midland and Scottish Railway during the Grouping of 1923. The line then passed on to the Scottish Region of British Railways on nationalisation in 1948. The old station closed to passenger traffic in 1964.

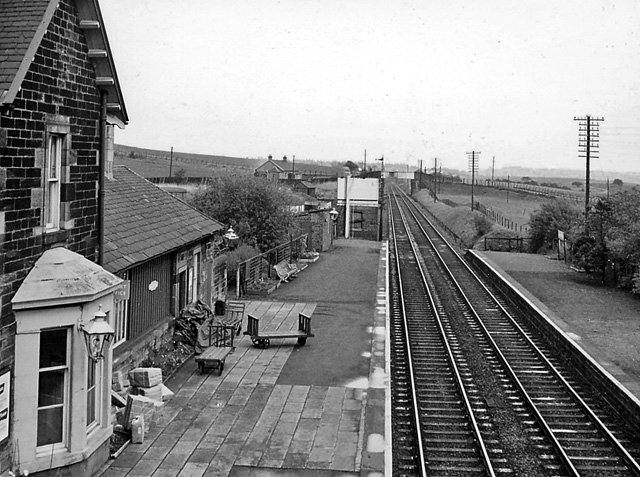
Baillieston station in 1961

== Services ==
A half-hourly service operates between Glasgow Central (Low Level) and Whifflet stations, on Mondays to Saturdays. Services run to/from Dalmuir, and one train per hour each way extends to/from Motherwell.

Sunday services formerly only ran for the month prior to Christmas and were extended to Shotts, but since the December 2014 timetable change and the start of EMU operation now run hourly each way all day throughout the year (to Balloch and Motherwell). Several freight trains also pass the halt every day.

Preceding station	National Rail	Following station
Bargeddie	ScotRail; Argyle Line	Mount Vernon
