= Bargeddie =

Village in North Lanarkshire, Scotland

Coordinates: 55.85255°N 4.07659°W

Bargeddie: Scottish Gaelic: Bàrr Geadaidh
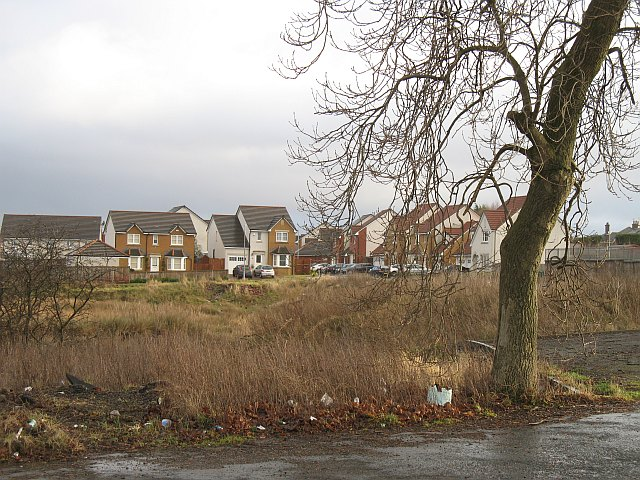
- A housing estate in Bargeddie

- Location within North Lanarkshire Bargeddie (North Lanarkshire)
- Population: 3,210 (2020)
- Council area: North Lanarkshire
- Lieutenancy area: Lanarkshire
- Country: Scotland
- Sovereign state: United Kingdom
- Post town: Glasgow
- Postcode district: G69
- Dialling code: 0141
- Police: Scotland
- Fire: Scottish
- Ambulance: Scottish
- UK Parliament: Coatbridge, Chryston and Bellshill
- Scottish Parliament: Coatbridge and Chryston

Bargeddie (/bɑːrˈɡɛdi/; Scottish Gaelic: Bàrr Geadaidh) is a village in North Lanarkshire, Scotland, just inside the suburban fringe of Glasgow, 8 miles (13 km) east of the city centre, and close to the junction of the M73 and M8 motorways. The nearest major town is Coatbridge, two miles (three kilometres) to the east.

== History ==
There was no village of Bargeddie before the 1930s when Lanark County Council built a housing estate at Dykehead. Before that the area consisted of a cluster of hamlets and villages such as Bartonshill, Braehead, and Dykehead, populated in the main by coal miners. In the 1950s, another housing estate was built around the site of Bargeddie House which was demolished after World War II. Bargeddie grew further as part of the overall Glasgow area expansion with the addition of the Drumpellier Lawns, Burnside View and The Fairways housing developments.

== Present day ==
Bargeddie is now populated by 3,210 people. The village has two primary schools; Bargeddie Primary School and St. Kevins Primary School.

The Safety Zone is a popular community project run by Elutheria Ltd, a group consisting of local volunteers. The centre offers activities for all ages from babies to elderly people and all stages in between. There are three shops in Bargeddie one at the front of the village, middle and back and a Community Centre which is locally known as "The Windsor" that also sits in Bargeddie. Just before coming to Coatbridge, there is a Showcase Complex which includes of Hollywood Bowl and Showcase Cinema.

== Transport ==
The town is served by Bargeddie railway station. There are also bus stops which allow villagers to travel to Glasgow and Coatbridge. Bargeddie is served by three bus routes, one of which goes to Glasgow city centre, the 2. There is also a bus that stops at Bargeddie that can take villagers to Edinburgh. As of 2016 there is a bus run by McGill's Bus Services, that takes local villagers around the village and up to Coatbridge and Airdrie.

== Sport ==
The most successful club within the village is Bargeddie Carpet Bowling Club, which has run on Tuesday evenings since 1981. The club was based in the Windsor Hall(now demolished), an old miners' welfare hall, now controlled by North Lanarkshire Council. The hall celebrated its 100th anniversary in 2008 with a party organised by Bargeddie Forward.

Former Scottish football player and Arsenal manager George Graham was born in Bargeddie. Football remains an important part of life in the area. Bargeddie United Amateur Football Club was well known in the Glasgow area but no longer has an adult team and has been without a home pitch since their previous one, Bargeddie Pavilion, was destroyed by a fire in 2010. The club has not had any success since Baldy Steven McGuinness' squad won the Lanarkshire League.

In 2009 "Bargeddie Colts" youth football team were reformed. By end of 2011 over 90 children between 5–12 years old were playing football in the "Monklands Soccer Sevens" leagues and the club had achieved SFA Quality Mark "Standard Award".

== Places of worship ==
- Bargeddie Parish Church is situated on Barton's Hill, a 10-minute walk from the village.
- United Free Church is located on Langmuir Road.
- Saint Kevin's Catholic Church is located on Mainhill Road.

== Notable people ==
- Jon Connolly goalkeeper for Motherwell FC
- Jimmy Hamilton (1901–1975), professional footballer, one cap for Scotland
- George Graham (born 1944), footballer and manager, 12 caps for Scotland

== See also ==
- List of places in Scotland

== Notes and references ==
- Rental Book Baronia de Glasgow 1513 - 1570
- RCAHMS image of Bargeddie Parish Church
- Canmore/RCAHMS image of Drumpark Brickworks, Bargeddie
- RAILSCOT images of Rutherglen and Coatbridge Railway
