= Radcliffe Black Lane railway station =

Former railway station in England

Radcliffe Black Lane

General information
- Location: Radcliffe, Bury; England
- Coordinates: 53.57558°N 2.33950°W
- Grid reference: SD776088
- Platforms: 2

Other information
- Status: Disused

History
- Original company: Liverpool & Bury Railway
- Pre-grouping: Lancashire and Yorkshire Railway
- Post-grouping: London, Midland and Scottish Railway

Key dates
- 20 November 1848: Opened as Black Lane
- 1 July 1933: Renamed Radcliffe Black Lane
- 5 October 1970: Closed
Location

Radcliffe Black Lane was a railway station in Radcliffe, Greater Manchester on the now closed Liverpool and Bury Railway between Bury and Bolton.

== History ==
The station opened on 20 November 1848, originally being named Black Lane. On 1 July 1933 it was renamed Radcliffe Black Lane, and it closed on 5 October 1970.

Preceding station	Disused railways	Following station
Bradley Fold	L&YR	Bury Knowsley Street
