= Whifflet Line =

Railway line in Glasgow, Scotland

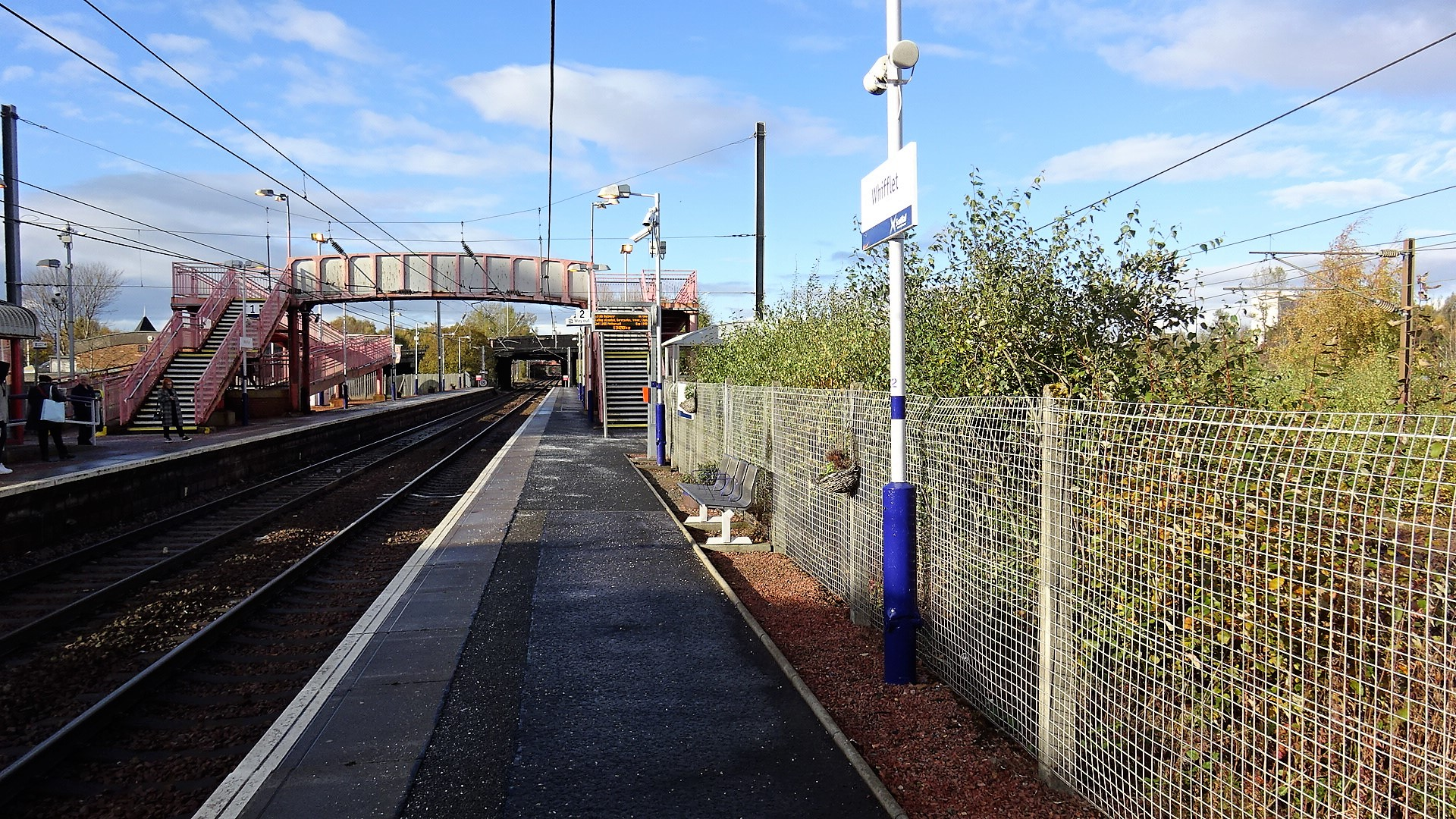
- Whifflet railway station

Overview
- Owner: Network Rail
- Locale: Glasgow; Scotland
- Termini: Glasgow Central; Motherwell
- Stations: 7

Service
- System: National Rail
- Operator(s): ScotRail
- Rolling stock: Class 318, Class 320, Class 334

Technical
- Track gauge: 4 ft 8 1/2 in (1,435 mm)
Route map
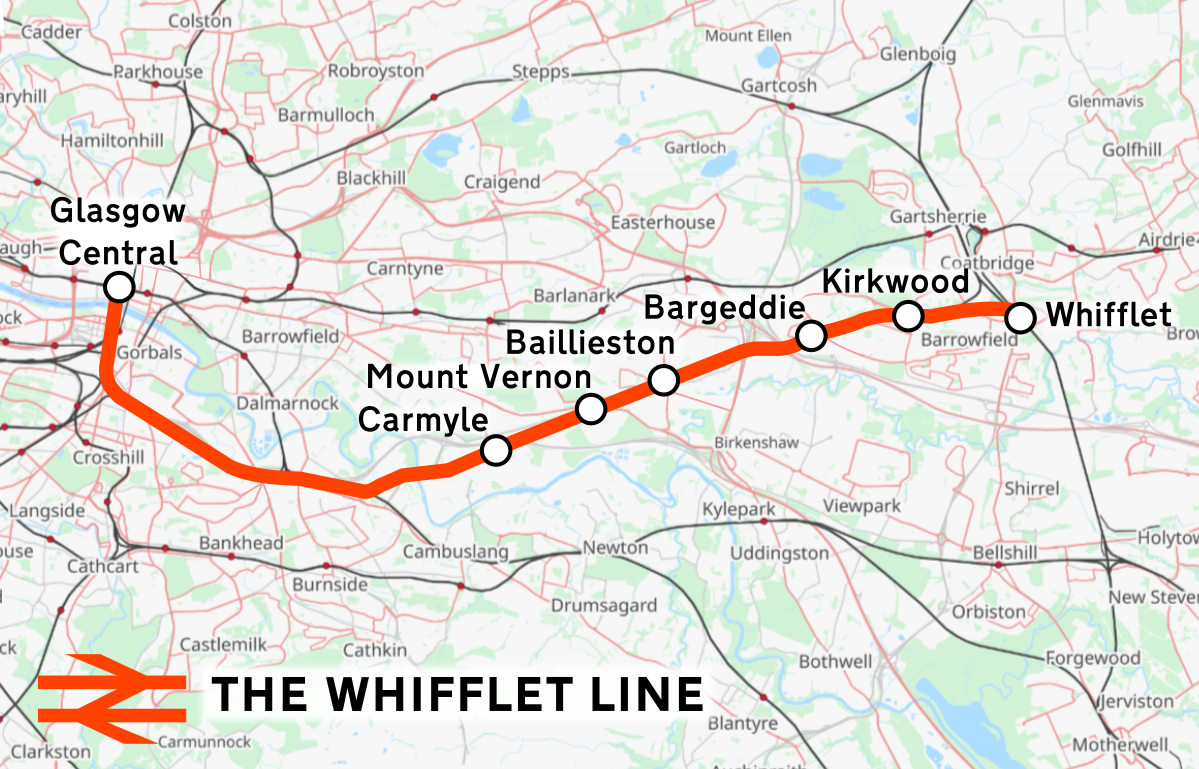
(Click to expand)

The Whifflet Line is one of the lines within the Strathclyde suburban rail network in Scotland.

== History ==
The line was built between 1863 and 1865 as the Rutherglen and Coatbridge Railway, part of the Caledonian Railway. It opened to goods traffic (mainly coal and iron) in September 1865 and to passengers in August 1866. It has been in continuous operation ever since. Stations in the first service on the line were at Carmyle, Broomhouse (now Mount Vernon), Baillieston, Langloan and Whifflet High Level (until 1964). Passenger services ceased in November 1966 following the Beeching Axe (latterly running to Coatbridge Central). Between 1972 and 1974 scheduled passenger trains between Glasgow Central and Perth used the route. For the following twenty years, the route was only used for freight and diverted passenger services. However the line was reopened by British Rail to scheduled passenger services with intermediate stations on 4 October 1993, running to the newly built station at Whifflet rather than Coatbridge Central as previously.

== Line description ==
The modern line currently serves seven stations. It connects parts of south east Glasgow, Bargeddie and Coatbridge to Glasgow city centre. Between Glasgow Central and Rutherglen, the line shares the same track as the West Coast Main Line before branching off in a north easterly direction towards Coatbridge.

== Services ==
The route is operated by ScotRail.

=== 1993 to 2002 ===
Following re-opening as a passenger line, service was provided by a mix of 1980s Class 156 and 1950s Class 101 DMUs. During their final years, the last of Class 101 DMUs were used, reduced from 3-car by having the centre trailer removed. In 2002, the remaining 101s were withdrawn from service on the Whifflet line, and more modern units took over the services.

=== 2009 service pattern ===
Trains operated at a half-hour frequency. All services were scheduled to run as two-car trains only, although four carriage services were technically possible. Services were operated using Class 158 DMUs and the occasional Class 156 DMU. Three trains operated on this route during the day, usually remaining dedicated on this service throughout the day.

=== From December 2014 ===
In late 2014, the Whifflet Line electrification was commissioned and from 14 December 2014 the service was incorporated into the Argyle Line, operated by EMUs. At the same time an all year round Sunday service commenced. Current Sunday Service is hourly from Balloch to Motherwell via Whifflet.

=== Anderston Tunnel Closure, 2022 ===
In February 2022, ScotRail announced a £32million improvement works for the Anderston Tunnel to improve reliability for passengers. As part of the improvement works, engineers completed a series of projects to repair and replace infrastructure on the line through central Glasgow.

As part of the works, Anderston Tunnel closed for a period of eight weeks. The line between Rutherglen and Exhibition Centre was closed throughout the works, and no trains ran. The works started on 13 March 2022 and ended on 8 May 2022.

During the period of closure, services were rerouted via Glasgow Central High Level.

== Line Developments ==
In 2006, Network Rail announced tentative proposals to electrify the Rutherglen - Whifflet section as part of a £1.4bn upgrade to Scotland's railways. The main benefits of this scheme were to provide an enhanced frequency for the Whifflet to central Glasgow routes and to provide an electric diversionary path for long distance WCML services. The new timetable came into operation on 14 December 2014, the Whifflet Line has been added to the Argyle Line system with services through Glasgow Central Low Level to the western suburbs.

== Sources ==
- Jowett, Alan (March 1989). Jowett's Railway Atlas of Great Britain and Ireland: From Pre-Grouping to the Present Day (1st ed.). Sparkford: Patrick Stephens Ltd. ISBN 978-1-85260-086-0. OCLC 22311137.
- Yonge, John (May 1987). Gerald Jacobs (ed.). British Rail Track Diagrams - Book 1: ScotRail (1st ed.). Exeter: Quail Map Company. ISBN 0-9006-0948-6.
- Yonge, John (February 1993). Gerald Jacobs (ed.). Railway Track Diagrams - Book 1: Scotland and the Isle of Man (2nd ed.). Exeter: Quail Map Company. ISBN 0-9006-0995-8.
- Yonge, John (April 1996). Gerald Jacobs (ed.). Railway Track Diagrams - Book 1: Scotland and the Isle of Man (3rd ed.). Exeter: Quail Map Company. ISBN 1-8983-1919-7.
- Yonge, John (2007). Gerald Jacobs (ed.). Railway Track Diagrams - Book 1: Scotland & Isle of Man (Quail Track Plans) (fifth ed.). Bradford on Avon: Trackmaps (formerly Quail Map Co). ISBN 978-0-9549866-3-6. OCLC 79435248.
- Page 25 - First ScotRail timetable for this route.
