= Auchenshuggle =

Area of Glasgow, Scotland

Coordinates: 55.842313°N 4.175801°W

Auchenshuggle: Scottish Gaelic: Achadh an t-Seagail; Scots: Auchenshoogle
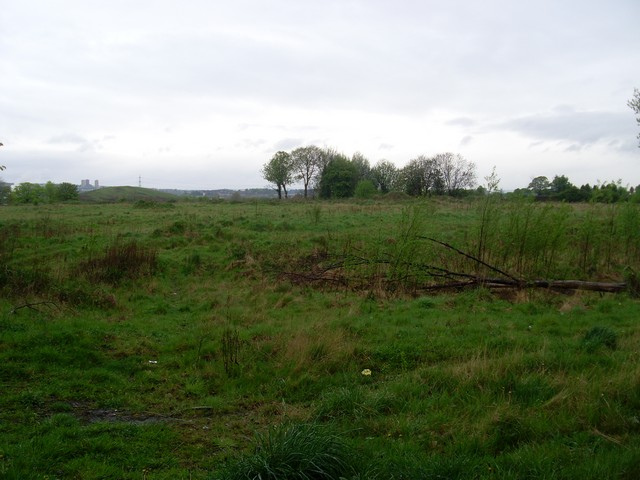
- Wasteland at Auchenshuggle, formerly a terminus for Glasgow's trams, 2009

- Location within the Glasgow City council area Location within Scotland
- OS grid reference: NS638627
- Council area: Glasgow City
- Lieutenancy area: Glasgow
- Country: Scotland
- Sovereign state: United Kingdom
- Post town: GLASGOW
- Postcode district: G32 8
- Dialling code: 0141
- Police: Scotland
- Fire: Scottish
- Ambulance: Scottish
- UK Parliament: Glasgow East
- Scottish Parliament: Glasgow Shettleston

Auchenshuggle (/ˌɒxənˈʃʊɡəl/ okh-ən-SHOOG-əl; Scottish Gaelic: Achadh an t-Seagail, lit. 'the rye field') is an area of Glasgow in Scotland, to the south of Tollcross.

It was the easternmost part of the Braidfauld (45th) Ward of the City of Glasgow, and has been in the larger Shettleston ward since 2007.

== The role of public transport in spreading the name ==
The quaint name was made famous throughout the city by Glasgow Corporation Tramways. Auchenshuggle was the eastern terminus of tram service number 9 and was duly carried on the destination boards of tramcars. Service No 9 ran between Auchenshuggle and Dalmuir West (a district of Clydebank). The service was extended from its previous terminus at Springfield Road in 1922.

The area is at the east end of Glasgow close to London Road, and it was often said that Glasgow Corporation Transport Department invented the name so that curious tourists and city dwellers would travel there thus increasing revenue. In fact, the terminus (at Braidfauld Street) was directly opposite a group of 19th century cottages, now replaced by 1960s council houses, named "Auchenshuggle Cottages".

Service No 9 was the final route on which trams were run in the city. The last regular tram ran on 1 September 1962. On 2, 3 and 4 September, a special tram service was operated between Auchenshuggle and Anderston Cross on which souvenir tickets were sold. This proved attractive to those who wished to take a final sentimental journey.

The route was taken by bus service No 64. There was also service No. 22 which operated between Auchenshuggle and Castlemilk via Shettleston Road, Duke Street and Rutherglen, however this service has been withdrawn.

No service currently [June 2015] uses Auchenshuggle terminus or even the destination on its signage, although it does still stop there. Also the link between Clydebank and Auchenshuggle on service 64 no longer exists, the 64 terminates in Glasgow City Centre and no longer serves Clydebank. Service 308 also uses Auchenshuggle as a stop.

There was a railway station at Auchenshuggle between the 1890s and the 1960s, but it was named Tollcross.

== Auchenshuggle Wood and Community Nature Park ==
The Auchenshuggle Wood lies to the south of London Road, and is now site of a community nature park, established in 1982. After the Glasgow Commonwealth Games in 2014, the park was designated a Commonwealth Woodland as part of the Games legacy project.

== Recent developments ==
As part of the northern extension of the M74 Motorway, a new Auchenshuggle Bridge over the River Clyde was completed and opened in 2011. Adjacent to the junction serving the area (2A) is a small retail park featuring fast food restaurants, car showroom, furniture shop, clothing retailer and a budget hotel with attached public house (Orion Way).
