= Rutherglen and Coatbridge Railway =

Former railway line in Scotland

The Rutherglen and Coatbridge Railway was a railway line in Scotland built by the Caledonian Railway to shorten the route from the Coatbridge area to Glasgow. It opened in 1865. It was later extended to Airdrie in 1886, competing with the rival North British Railway. Soon after a further extension was built from Airdrie to Calderbank and Newhouse.

The line closed to passengers in 1964, but the core section from Rutherglen to Coatbridge remained open for goods traffic.

It was reopened in 1993 as the Whifflet Line for local passenger trains and later electrified, and is in use at the present day.

== History ==
=== The coal railways ===
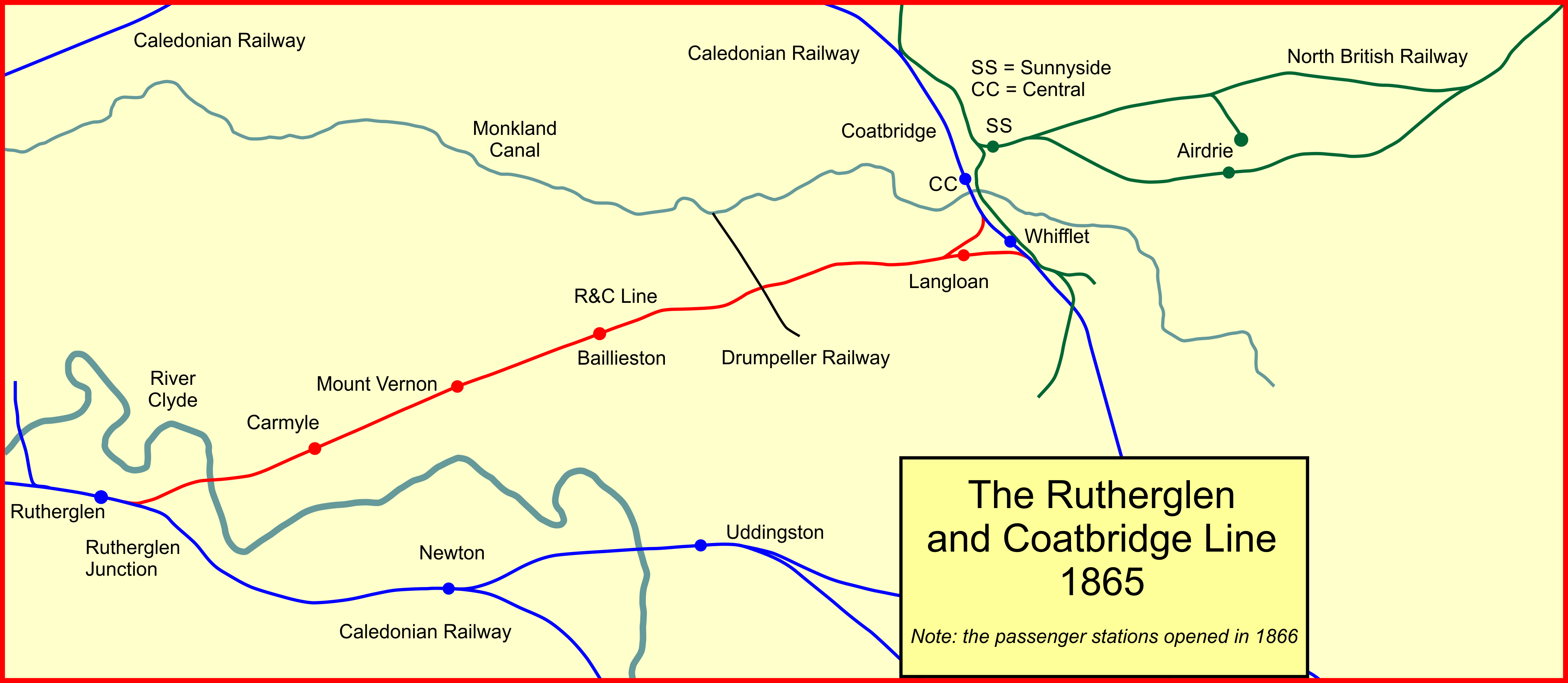
System map of the R&C line in 1865

The first railways in the Coatbridge area were the so-called coal railways: the Monkland and Kirkintilloch Railway (M&KR) of 1826, built primarily to convey coal from the Monklands pits south-east of Airdrie to Glasgow and the Forth and Clyde Canal, and its associated lines. The M&KR was itself by-passed by the Garnkirk and Glasgow Railway of 1831, with a Glasgow terminus at Townhead. These railways started as horse-operated lines with stone block sleepers and a non-standard local track gauge, clearly with no thought of developing a network.

The Monklands coal was abundant, and when black band ironstone was discovered nearby, and the hot blast furnace system of iron smelting was developed locally, and suddenly the Monklands, Airdrie and Coatbridge, was the centre of phenomenal growth in the iron industries.

The coal railways had been planned in an era when level routes were required for horse haulage, and the line through Coatbridge was south to north, reaching Glasgow, in the case of the Garnkirk line, by a wide northward sweep.

=== The Caledonian Railway ===
The Caledonian Railway was authorised in 1845; it was to be a main line railway from Glasgow and Edinburgh to Carlisle, making long-distance connections with the merging English railway network. It was capitalised at £1.5 million, a vast amount of money at the time, and the entry to Glasgow was to be made over the coal railways to avoid the cost of new construction there. The Caledonian arranged to lease and take over the Wishaw and Coltness Railway and the Glasgow, Garnkirk and Coatbridge Railway, successor to the Garnkirk and Glasgow line, and run to Glasgow over those lines. They had to be regauged to standard gauge and strengthened for main line train running. When the Caledonian Railway opened throughout in 1848 it reached Glasgow from Garriongill Junction via Wishaw and Motherwell, and then Whifflet and Coatbridge, then via Gartsherrie and Garnkirk to Townhead. The Glasgow terminus was soon altered to be at Buchanan Street, nearer the city centre.

While the Caledonian Railway Bill was going through the parliamentary process, another bill was in the system, for the Clydesdale Junction Railway. This was to run from Motherwell to a Glasgow terminus called South Side. It was some distance from the city centre but the route from Motherwell was much more direct than the Garnkirk line, and the Caledonian concluded a lease agreement with the Clydesdale company even before either company was authorised.

=== Exporting the product ===
Many iron works grew up adjacent to the Caledonian line in the Coatbridge area. Numerous new and extended pits were located to the existing line and many mineral branch lines were built to serve the growing industry. Short hauls of coal and iron to the iron works were necessary, but also hauls of the resultant iron and finished products, and also of coal and iron ore for export were critical. The berthing facilities for ships at Broomielaw in Glasgow were limited, although the General Terminus and Glasgow Harbour Railway, opened in 1848, improved matters considerably; nonetheless much material went to Ardrossan Harbour. Both these destinations required a route to the south side of the Clyde in Glasgow, and the north–south alignment of the Caledonian line in Coatbridge was a significant impediment. For the time being the Caledonian had other priorities.

=== The Rutherglen and Coatbridge line ===
Caledonian Railway (Rutherglen and Coatbridge Branches) Act 1861
- Act of Parliament
- Parliament of the United Kingdom
- Long title: An Act to enable the Caledonian Railway Company to make a Branch Railway from Rutherglen to Coatbridge, with a Branch to Whifflat; and for other Purposes.
- Citation: 24 & 25 Vict. c. ccii

Dates
- Royal assent: 1 August 1861

The Caledonian developed a plan for a line to run directly west from the Coatbridge area towards Glasgow, and this became the Rutherglen and Coatbridge line. It was authorised by the Caledonian Railway (Rutherglen and Coatbridge Branches) Act 1861 (24 & 25 Vict. c. ccii) on 1 August 1861 with capital of £240,000. The line crossed easy terrain, but it crossed the River Clyde a short distance east of Rutherglen Junction, where it converged with the former Clydesdale Junction main line. It forked in the Coatbridge area: a northward arm ran to Coatbridge station, and a southward fork led to Whifflat Junction. (Whifflat is spelt Whifflet nowadays.) Both junctions were on the Caledonian main line south of Coatbridge; there were a great number of pits and ironworks in the general area there; Dundyvan, Langloan and Summerlee ironworks were directly served. In addition several pits developed along the line of route from Carmyle eastwards.

The line opened on 20 September 1865 from Calder to Rutherglen Junction for goods and mineral traffic, and to passengers on 8 January 1866. It crossed the Drumpeller Railway (sometimes spelt Drumpellier), which was a 4 ft 6in gauge horse-operated railway, dedicated to conveying coal to the Monkland Canal. For the time being the Caledonian did not make any connection to it, but in June 1872 it took it over, by the Caledonian Railway and Forth and Clyde Navigation Companies Act 1867 (30 & 31 Vict. c. cvi) of 20 June 1867, and converted the gauge to standard. The Caledonian made a spur connection, west to south at Bargeddie station. (The necessity of conveying coal to the canal was obviously reduced and the pits' output travelled throughout by rail; the portion that served the canal was disused by 1896.

The junctions at Whifflet and Langloan created a focus of heavy industry and soon numerous iron works and associated metal working industries were established there.

=== Extension to Airdrie ===
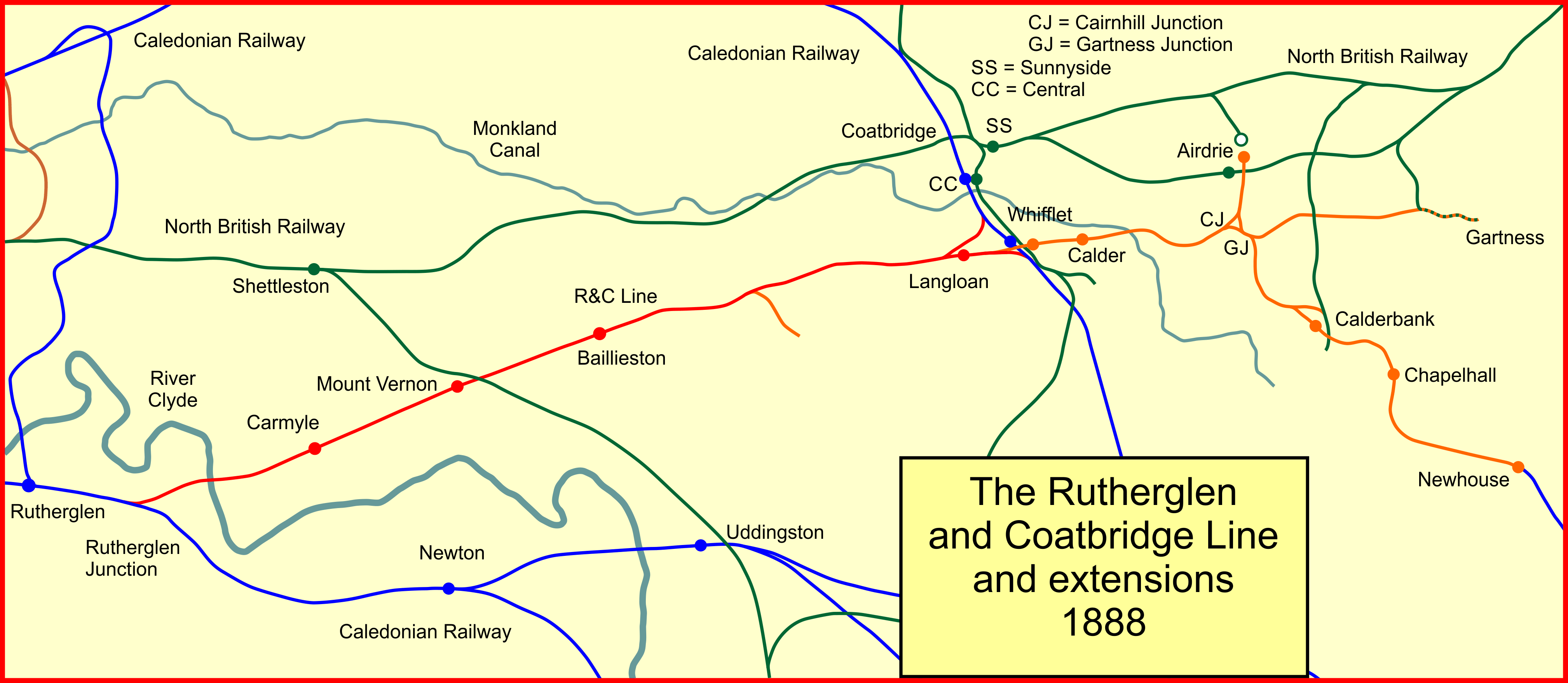
System map of the R&C line in 1888

Airdrie had preceded Coatbridge in the mineral industry, and was an important industrial community. It had been served by the North British Railway, but the people of Airdrie were pleased at the idea of competition when the Caledonian Railway extended to Rutherglen and Coatbridge line to their town. It opened on 19 April 1886 for goods traffic and on 1 June 1886 for passenger trains. It ran from Langloan Junction, where the earlier Coatbridge and Whifflet arms had diverged, crossing first over the north–south main line at Whifflet and then over the Monkland Canal by a high viaduct and bridge at Sheepford. It turned north to enter Airdrie, crossing the NBR line to a terminus on Graham Street. The competing lines encouraged an excellent passenger service from Airdrie to Glasgow on both routes.

The line was extended south from Airdrie to Chapelhall, serving also the Calderbank ironworks, opening on 1 September 1887. A triangular junction off the Airdrie line was formed.

A further extension of that line was made to Newhouse on 2 July 1888. (The line connected at a point just south of Newhouse had already been reached by a mineral line from Linridge (or Lanridge) Junction, served from the Bellside line. Numerous spurs to pits and factories were laid in, and a limited passenger service from Airdrie to Morningside was laid on.

=== Gartness branch ===
The Gartness Branch was built from Airdrie to a colliery at Gartness Colliery. The North British had already reached the locality by branch from the Monkland Railways line and the Caledonian reached it in 1887; the final mile of the branch was jointly owned and operated.

=== Glasgow Central Railway and the Lanarkshire and Ayrshire Railway ===
In the 1890s the Glasgow Central Railway was planned: it was to be an east–west inner city line through the centre of Glasgow. At its eastern end it connected to Rutherglen, but an extension ran from Bridgeton through Tollcross to Carmyle, joining the Rutherglen and Coatbridge line, leaving it again to the south to reach Newton. This part of the line opened in 1897.

This was followed by the construction of the Lanarkshire and Ayrshire Railway between Ardrossan Harbour and Newton via Cathcart, built chiefly to shorten the route for mineral traffic. It reached Newton in 1904, and a connection from the Tollcross direction at Westburn Junction to the Cathcart direction at Kirkhill Junction was made. It had two impressive viaducts, over the River Clyde and the West Coast Main Line respectively. The passenger service was always very limited, and it ceased on 17 June 1956. The line was used for carriage stabling for the Kirkhill line trains until it was completely closed in August 1966.

== Closures ==
The Rutherglen and Coatbridge line duplicated the North British line from Glasgow to Coatbridge and Airdrie, and passenger services were withdrawn from the branch to Whifflet (High Level) on 5 October 1964 when the Glasgow Central Railway (that ran through the Low Level lines) was closed. Trains had run via Carmyle and Bridgeton Cross. Services were thereafter diverted to run between Central High Level & Coatbridge Central, but these were in turn withdrawn on 7 November 1966. Some through working by long-distance trains (such as Glasgow Central to Perth) continued until 1974.

On 6 July 1964 the line east of Calder was closed completely.

The section from Airdrie to Newhouse closed to passengers on 1 December 1930.

== Partial reopening ==
The core Rutherglen and Coatbridge line, from Rutherglen Junction to Coatbridge and Whifflet, (and a short extension to the Calder tube works) remained open for freight trains, and on 4 October 1993 passenger trains resumed running on part of the line, funded by the Strathclyde Passenger Transport Executive. The new services ran from Glasgow Central High Level via Rutherglen, to a station at Whifflet, on the south-facing apex of the triangle there, with intermediate stations at Carmyle, Mount Vernon and Baillieston.

The line was later electrified (in September 2014) and the trains run from the Argyle line to Whifflet. Additional stations were later opened so that the calls from Rutherglen are now Carmyle, Mount Vernon, Baillieston, Bargeddie, Kirkwood and Whifflet. Services are operated by ScotRail.

== Topography ==
=== Down to 1964 ===
- Rutherglen Junction, later Rutherglen East Junction; divergence from Motherwell main line;
- Carmyle; station and converging junction from Tollcross; opened 8 January 1866; closed 4 October 1964;
- Carmyle Junction; diverging junction to Newton;
- Mount Vernon; opened 8 January 1866; closed 16 August 1943;
- Baillieston; opened 8 January 1866; closed 4 October 1964;
- Tannochside Junction; mineral lines diverge;
- Drumpeller Junction; mineral lines diverge;
- Drumpark; opened 1 May 1934; closed 4 October 1964;
- Langloan; opened 8 January 1866; closed 4 October 1964;
- Langloan Junction; divergence of Whifflet line;
- Coatbridge Junction; converges with line towards Coatbridge.

Whifflet spur:

- Langloan Junction;
- Whifflet Junction; converges with line towards Mossend.

Airdrie extension:

- Langloan Junction;
- Whifflet High Level; opened 1 June 1886; closed 1 January 1917; reopened 1 March 1919; renamed Whifflet Upper 1953; closed 5 October 1964;
- Calder; opened 1 June 1886; closed 1 January 1917; reopened 1 March 1919; closed 3 May 1943;
- Cairnhill Junction; divergence of Newhouse line;
- Airdrie South Junction; convergence of Newhouse line;
- Airdrie; opened 1 June 1886; on 1 January 1917 the service from Whifflet was suspended, only the service to Newhouse continuing; full service resumed 1 March 1919; closed 3 May 1943.

Newhouse line:

- Airdrie;
- Airdrie South Junction;
- Gartness Junction; convergence of line from Cairnhill Junction; divergence of mineral branch to Gartness;
- Calderbank Steel Works Junction;
- Calderbank; opened 1 September 1887; closed 1 December 1930;
- Chapelhall; opened 1 September 1887; closed 1 December 1930;
- Newhouse; end on junction for Morningside; opened 2 July 1888; closed 1 December 1930.

=== Modern route ===
- Rutherglen East Junction;
- Carmyle; opened 4 October 1993;
- Mount Vernon; opened 4 October 1993;
- Bailllieston; opened 4 October 1993; quarter-mile west of earlier station;
- Bargeddie; opened 4 October 1993 on site of former Drumpark station;
- Kirkwood; opened 4 October 1993;
- Langloan Junction; divergence of line towards Coatbridge;
- Whifflet Junction.

== Sources ==
- Awdry, Christopher (1990). Encyclopaedia of British Railway Companies. Sparkford: Patrick Stephens Ltd. ISBN 1-8526-0049-7. OCLC 19514063. CN 8983.
- Butt, R. V. J. (October 1995). The Directory of Railway Stations: details every public and private passenger station, halt, platform and stopping place, past and present (1st ed.). Sparkford: Patrick Stephens Ltd. ISBN 978-1-85260-508-7. OCLC 60251199. OL 11956311M.
- Jowett, Alan (March 1989). Jowett's Railway Atlas of Great Britain and Ireland: From Pre-Grouping to the Present Day (1st ed.). Sparkford: Patrick Stephens Ltd. ISBN 978-1-85260-086-0. OCLC 22311137.
