= Tibetan diaspora =

Tibetan people residing outside Tibet

Languages
- Tibetan

Religion
- Predominantly: Tibetan Buddhism; Minority: Islam • Christianity

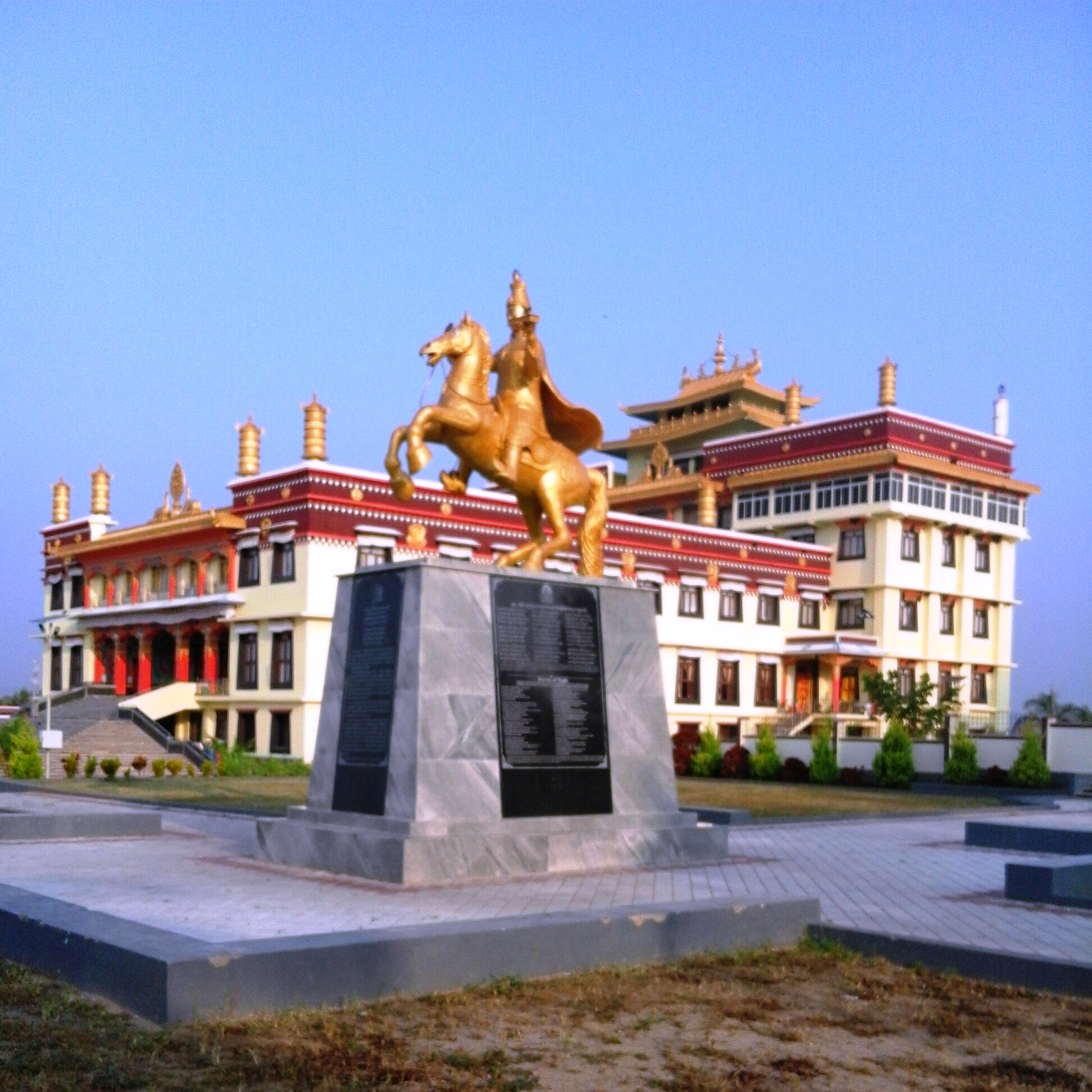
Tashi Lhunpo Monastery in Bylakuppe, India

The Tibetan diaspora are Tibetan people residing outside Tibet and mainland China. (Note: The term "Tibetan diaspora" generally does not refer to Tibetans living in other parts of mainland China.) The diaspora mostly consists of Tibetans exiled from Tibet, their land of origin, to other nation states to live as immigrants and refugees in communities. The diaspora of Tibetan people began in the early 1950s, peaked after the 1959 Tibetan uprising, and continues to exist.

Tibetan emigration has historically proceeded in waves, although the diaspora began growing when Tibetans began escaping from Kham in the early and mid 1950's, and moving to India. The internal migration of masses of Tibetans from Amdo and Kham to Lhasa and central Tibet also occurred at this time, before the 1959 Tibetan uprising in Lhasa. The first wave followed the March 1959 escape by the 14th Dalai Lama from Lhasa to Himachal Pradesh, India, before he eventually settled in Dharamsala. The second wave occurred in the 1980s, when China's Central Government partially eased its controls, including entry and egress from Tibet. A third wave began in 1996, after the kidnapping of the 11th Panchen Lama and a tightening of restrictions and government presence in Tibet.

Since the early 2010s the number of new arrivals joining the community in India has been in decline, and members of the diaspora have increasingly emigrated to new destinations. There are also reported to be substantial social tensions between first and second wave refugees, referred to as 'Shichak Tibetans' and third wave refugees referred to as 'Sanjor Tibetans'. The label 'Sanjor' is deemed a pejorative by the newcomer Tibetans.

Not all emigration from Tibet is permanent; some parents in Tibet sent their children to the communities in the diaspora to receive a traditional Tibetan Buddhist education. The 2009 census registered about 128,000 Tibetans in exile, with the most numerous part of the community living in India, Nepal and Bhutan. However, in 2005 and 2009, there were estimates of up to 150,000 living in exile.

== Origins and numbers ==
The Central Tibetan Administration (CTA) provides a Green Book - a kind of Tibetan identity certificate - to Tibetan refugees. Based on a CTA survey from 2009, 127,935 Tibetans were registered in the diaspora: in India 94,203; in Nepal 13,514; in Bhutan 1,298; and in rest of the world 18,920. However, their number is estimated at up to 150,000, as mentioned by both Edward J. Mills et al. in 2005 and by the 14th Dalai Lama in 2009.

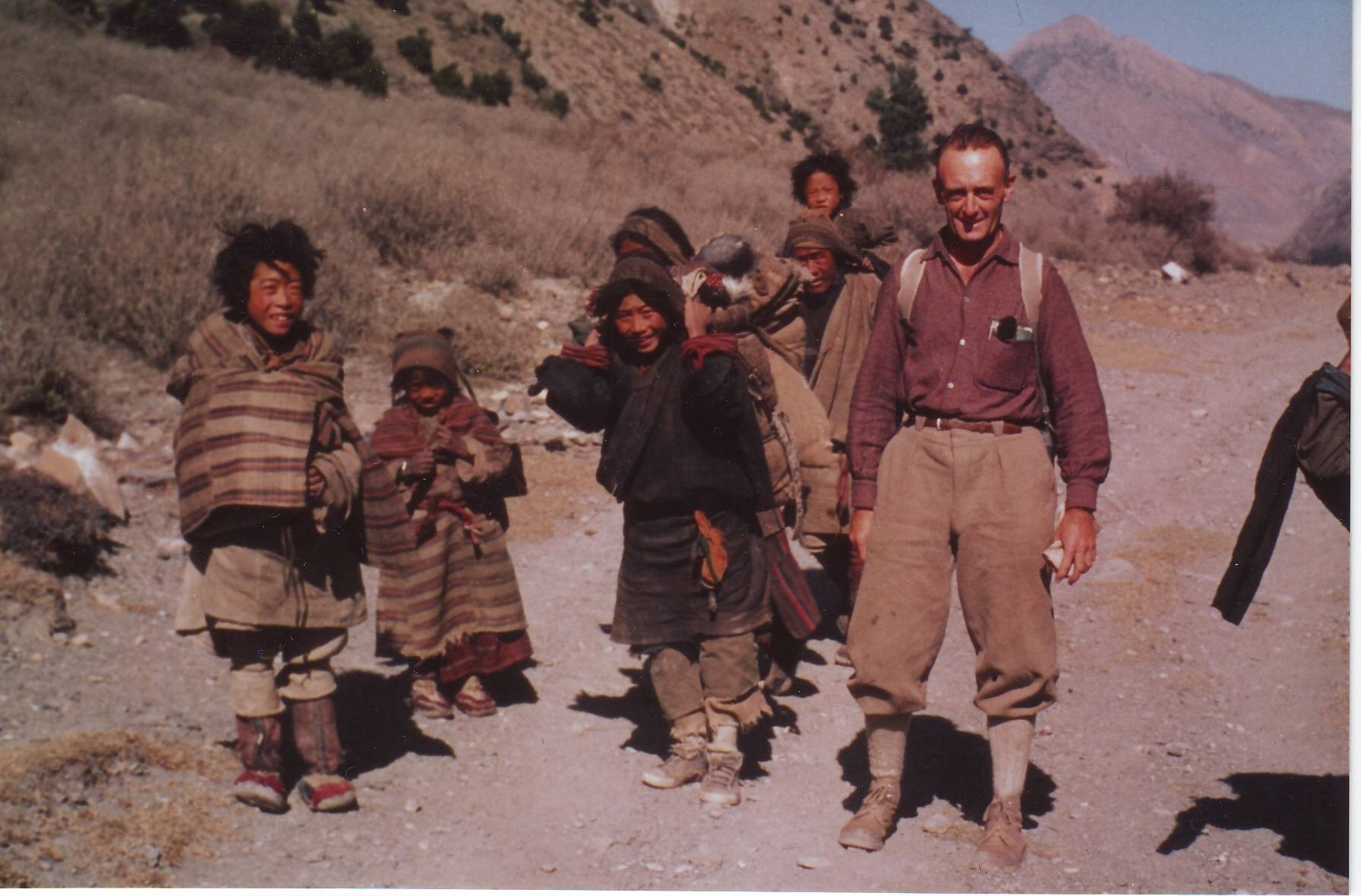
Rene de Milleville with Tibetan refugees in Gandaki Valley, near Jomosom, Nepal, October 1966. Note the head straps for carrying heavy loads. Most Tibetan refugees pass through Nepal to India, where The 14th Dalai Lama resides.

The larger of the other communities are in the United States, Canada (e.g. Toronto), the United Kingdom, Switzerland, Norway, France, Taiwan and Australia.

=== First wave ===
During the 1959 Tibetan uprising, the 14th Dalai Lama and some of his government fled to India. From 1959 to 1960, about 80,000 Tibetans followed the Dalai Lama to India through the Himalayas. Continued flights, estimated in the numbers of 1,000 to 2,500 a year, increased these numbers to 100,000. The movement of refugees during this time is sometimes referred to as an "exodus", as in a United Nations General Assembly resolution in 1961 that asserted that the presence of Tibetan refugees in neighboring countries was "evidence" of rights abuses in Tibet.

=== Second wave ===
After the opening of Tibet in the 1980s to trade and tourism, a second wave of Tibetan exodus took place due to increasing political repression. From 1986 to 1996, 25,000 Tibetans joined and increased their exiled community in India by 18%. This movement of refugees during this second wave is sometimes referred to as a "second exodus".

According to a leaked US diplomatic cable, from 1980 to November 2009, 87,096 Tibetans arrived in India and registered at the Dharamsala reception center, whereas 46,620 returned to Tibet after a pilgrimage in India. Most of those staying are children to attend Tibetan Children's Villages school.

=== Third wave: Sanjorwa era ===
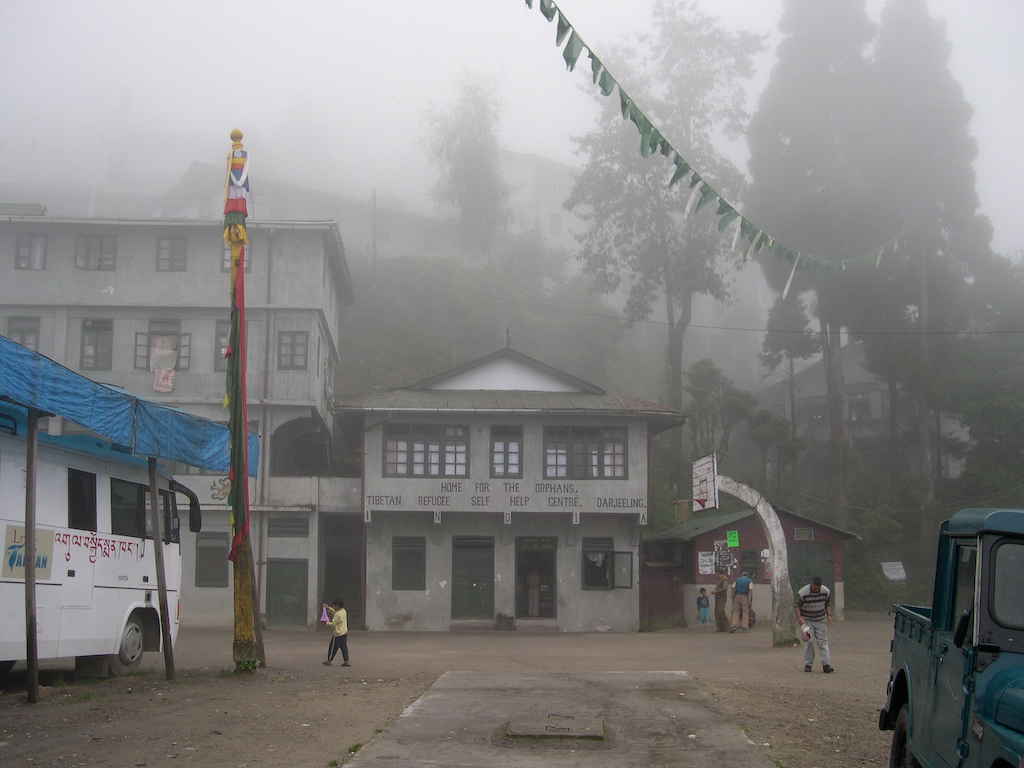
Tibetan Refugee Self-Help Centre's Hill Top Shop in Darjeeling, India taken in September 2004. It was established on 2 October 1959, the same year the Prime Minister Nehru gave refuge to The 14th Dalai Lama his Tibetan government-in-exile.

A large number of Tibetan refugees made their way into India in the 1990s after a long hiatus since 1979, and these new migrants earned the epithet ' Sanjor' or newcomer due to their fresh arrival status. A 2008 documentary directed by Richard Martini claimed that 3,000–4,500 Tibetans arrive at Dharamshala every year. Most new immigrants are children who are sent to Tibetan cultural schools. Many political activists, including monks, have also crossed over through Nepal to India. Significant cultural gaps exist between recent Tibetan emigrants (gsar 'byor pa, or "newcomer") and Indian-born Tibetans. The more established Tibetans in diaspora reject Tibetans from Tibet who recently defected Tibet, and who watch Chinese movies, sing Chinese music, and can speak Mandarin, are also well settled in the Tibetan community. The Dalai Lama encourages to learn multiple languages and can speak many languages himself.

Prejudicial attitude against third-wave Tibetan immigrants from 1959 immigrants exists in Tibetan diaspora world. Newcomers (post-1990s arrivals) are referred to as 'Sanjor' by the settled Tibetans, and face social discrimination in Tibetan settlements. The social relationship is tense, and inter-marriages are rare. Strong sense of tribalism exists between various emigre groups which has resulted in physical aggressions between monasteries in south India and first-wave immigrants in the region. Lobsang Sangay, former president of CTA has promised to create unity and mutual understanding between sanjors and shichaks, but Mcdonald notes no substantive conflict resolution effect had been made so far as of 2013.

=== 2010s onwards: Declining refugee arrivals, diversifed emigration ===
The number of Tibetan diaspora in India declined to 85,000 in 2019 from 150,000 in 2011, while immigration from China reduced from 3000 (2011) to 100 (2018) per year. Many Tibetan diaspora chose to emigrate to the United States, Canada, Germany, and Switzerland or return to China. Tibetan immigration destinations became increasingly diverse due to various factors, such as facing discrimination in India due to their refugee status, lack of job opportunities, or having difficulties accessing Indian social services.

In 2026, a CTA Minister reported that the numbers of emigrants arriving from Tibet to join the exile community in India had been "generally declining" since 2012, and by the end of September there had been only seven new arrivals from Tibet in the year so far.

== In India ==
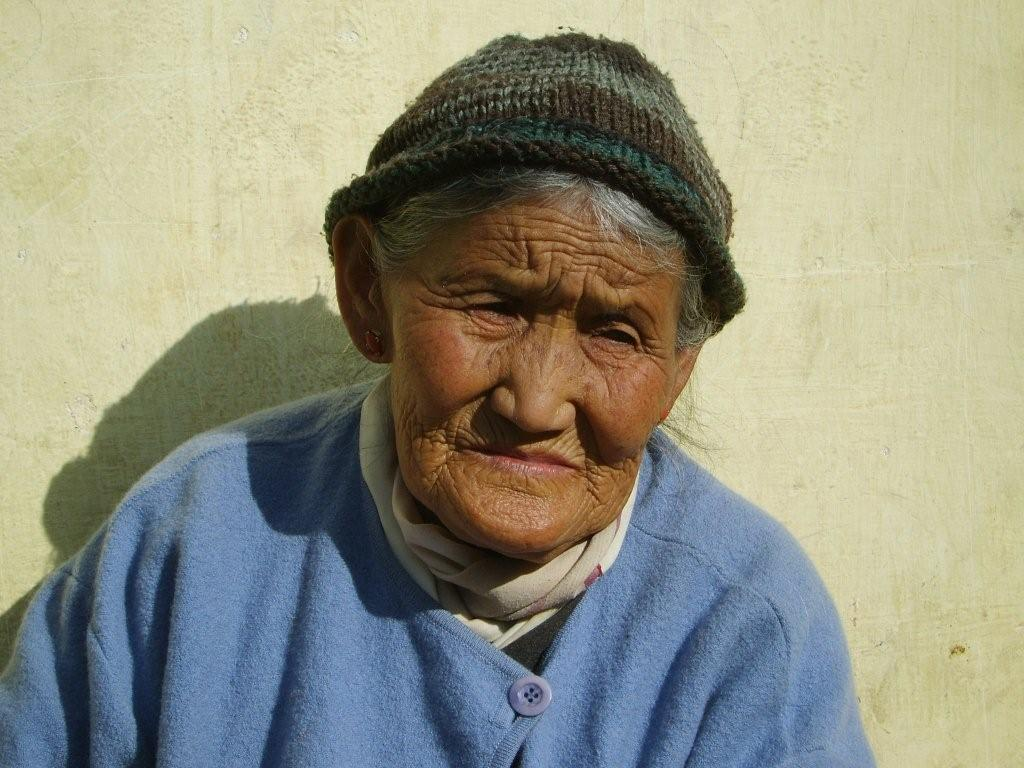
Tibetan woman in Indian Refugee Camp

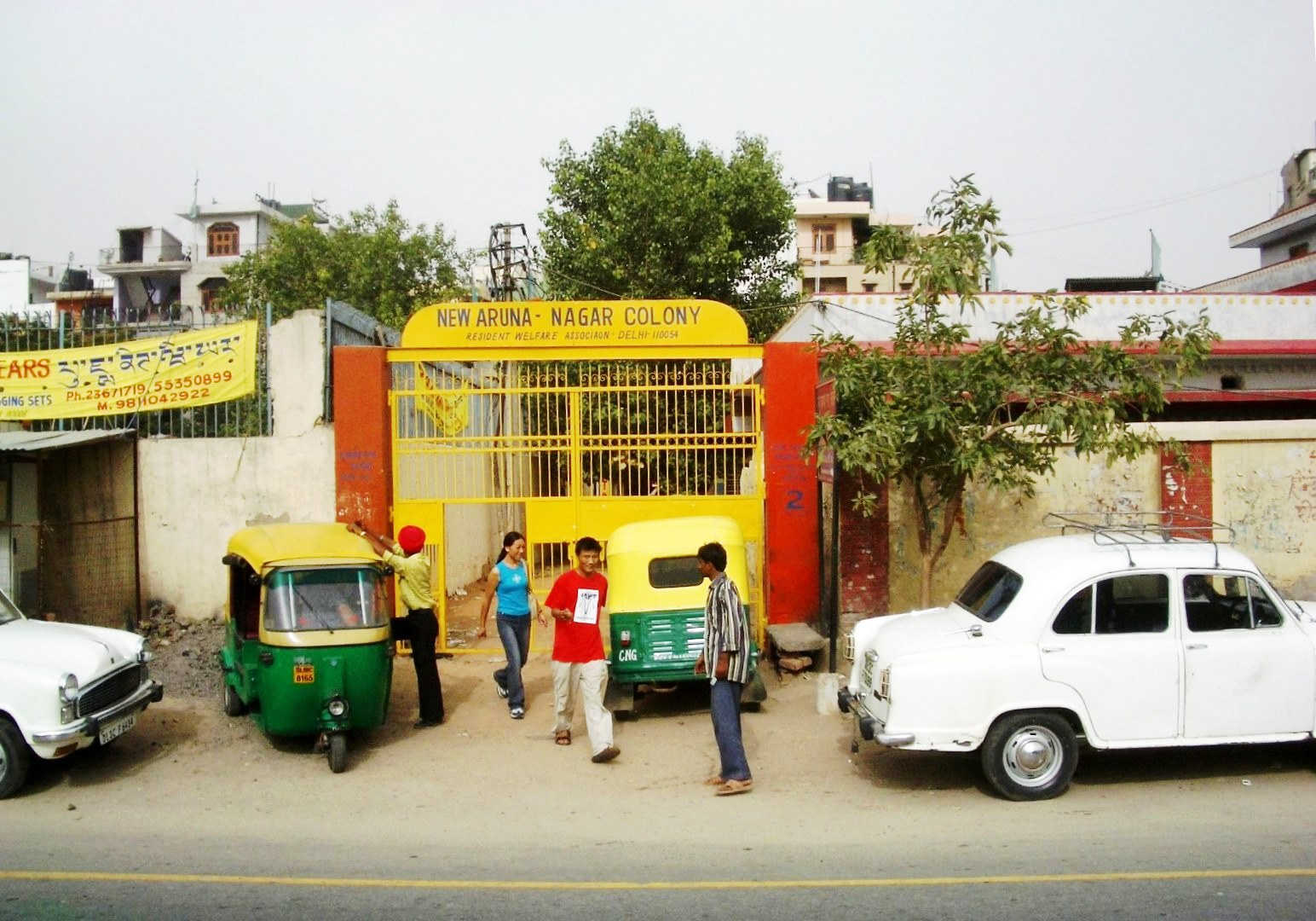
New Aruna-Nagar Tibetan settlement, Delhi

=== Organizations ===
In 1776, the first Tibetan Buddhist Temple in the plains of India, Bhot Bagan Moth was founded in Ghusuri by Puran Giri by the help of the third Panchen Lama.

The main organisation of the Tibetan diaspora is the Central Tibetan Administration of the 14th Dalai Lama based in the McLeod Ganj suburb of the city of Dharamsala in India. The CTA maintains Tibet Offices in 10 countries. These act as de facto embassies of the CTA offices of culture and information and effectively provide a kind of consular help to Tibetans. They are based in New Delhi, India; New York, USA; Geneva, Switzerland; Tokyo, Japan; London, UK; Canberra, Australia; Paris, France; Moscow, Russia; Pretoria, South Africa; and Taipei, Taiwan. The Tibetan diaspora NGOs deal with the cultural and social life of the diaspora, the preservation of cultural heritage, and the promotion of political Tibetan independence.

The first Tibetan non-governmental human rights organization to be established in exile in India was the Tibetan Centre for Human Rights and Democracy. TCHRD investigates and reports on human rights issues in Tibet and among Tibetan minorities throughout China.

=== Education ===
The Central Tibetan School Administration with a seat in New Delhi is an autonomous organization established in 1961 with the objective to establish, manage and assist schools in India for the education of Tibetan children living in India while preserving and promoting their culture and heritage. According to information on its own website, as of 2009 the Administration was running 71 schools in the areas of concentration of Tibetan population, with about 10,000 students on the roll from pre-primary to class XII, and with 554 teaching staff. According to the information on the website of the CTA, as of 2009.01.13. there were 28 CTSA schools whose enrollment was 9,991 students.

In 2009, The Tibetan Children's Villages established the first Tibetan higher college in exile in Bangalore (India) which was named "The Dalai Lama Institute for Higher Education". The goals of this college are to teach Tibetan language and Tibetan culture, as well as science, the arts, counseling and information technology.

=== Migration from settlements in India ===
Migration of young people from Tibetan settlements in India is a serious cause of concern as it threatens Tibetan identity and culture in exile with marginalization. According to Tenzin Lekshay, most exile settlements are guarded by elderly people, some established schools in the settlements are on the verge of closing for lack of pupils, and graduates are scattering to Indian cities because of the lack of employment opportunities in the community.

According to Nawang Thogmed, a CTA official, the most oft-cited problems for newly migrating Tibetans in India are the language barrier, their inability to adapt to consuming new food, and the warm climate, which makes Tibetan clothing uncomfortable. Some exiles also fear that their Tibetan culture is being diluted in India.

=== Struggles with Tibetan identity ===
In 1950, the People's Republic of China initiated the invasion of Tibet, leading to the occupation of the region by the Chinese People's Liberation Army. This set the stage for the largest Tibetan rebellion on May 10, 1959, now observed as Tibetan Uprising Day by present-day Tibetans. Although the rebellion was crushed by the People's Liberation Army, it resulted in the tragic loss of thousands of Tibetan lives and the forced exile of the 14th Dalai Lama, Tibet's political and religious leader. The Dalai Lama's departure prompted a massive migration of Tibetan citizens seeking asylum in India, resulting in the formation of the largest settlement of Tibetan refugees in India and the establishment of a nation in exile.

Initially marked by disorganization and harsh conditions due to the Tibetans' unfamiliarity with India's climate, the refugee camps underwent a transformative phase under the guidance of the Dalai Lama. Jawaharlal Nehru had an initial plan of dispersing the refugees among Indian citizens but at the behest of the Dalai Lama, agreed to settle the refugees in settlements. In 1960, the 14th Dalai Lama established the seat of the government in Dharamsala, persuading the Indian government to allocate uncultivated land for Tibetan refugees, a significant step in forming a government-in-exile. The first settlement, Bylakuppe in South India, demanded two years of labor and sacrifice to prepare the land for habitation. The Tibetan government was granted self-governance allowing over 30 settlements to be established across the Indian subcontinent, Bhutan, and Nepal, such as Bylakuppe, as self-reliant entities providing infrastructure and employment opportunities.

Despite admiration for the 14th Dalai Lama, the Indian government refrained from formally recognizing Tibetan leadership due to diplomatic relations with the People's Republic of China. Prime Minister Nehru, while advocating for Tibet's independence, maintained a delicate balance given his understanding, sympathy, and admiration for China. He rejected the suggestion of establishing an independent Tibet to prevent tension between India and China, considering Tibet's strategic and security importance to China.

The primary goal of the Tibetan government-in-exile was to safeguard Tibetan culture, religion, and language, provide education for the children, and maintain Tibetan identity in exile while advocating for freedom in Tibet. This raised questions about how assimilating into Indian society would affect Tibetan identity, prompting the Tibetan administration to prioritize cultural preservation over assimilation. The Tibetan diaspora has also undergone many waves of immigration and as more Tibetans are born outside of Tibet, the diaspora has experienced generational divides in political approaches to the freedom movement, with the first generation favoring the Dalai Lama's vision of autonomy and the second generation supporting total independence and more radical forms of political activism.

Despite residing in India, many Tibetans remain non-citizens, limiting their political, social, and economic rights. While the Indian government is eager to grant citizenship to Tibetans born in India, a significant number choose to maintain their "statelessness." Obtaining Indian citizenship requires surrendering a Tibetan’s right to live in the settlement and the benefits offered by the Tibetan administration, symbolized by the Registration Certificate. Despite being a document issued by Indian authorities, the Registration Certificate holds symbolic importance within the Tibetan community, serving as a unifying and belonging symbol and actively discouraging the pursuit of Indian citizenship.

Tenzin Tsundue, a Tibetan poet, author, and activist, emphasizes the struggle of statelessness in an interview for the Daily Star newspaper, expressing the daily challenges faced by Tibetans in exile as “living in limbo”. Despite the profound passion that Tibetans born in exile harbor for Tibet, Tsundue describes the harsh reality is that they have never set eyes on their homeland. The desire to belong and have ties to the land they passionately fight for is a recurring theme among Tibetans born in exile. Tsundue's poem, "Refugee," vividly captures this struggle, where he writes, "On your forehead / between your eyebrows / there is an R embossed / my teacher said. / I scratched and scrubbed / on my forehead I found / a brash of red pain. / I am born a refugee". This overall sentiment conveyed in the quote illustrates the internal conflict of being a refugee, grappling with the desire for a consolidated identity amidst the challenges of statelessness and the relentless pursuit of freedom for Tibet.

== In Bhutan ==
Few Tibetans settled in Bhutan after 1959, as the country was used mainly as a transit route to India. However, in 1961, following growing tensions between China and India, India sealed its northern border with Bhutan, prompting Bhutan to arrange an emergency meeting with the Government of India (GOI) and the CTA to deal with the Tibetans stuck in the country. The government of Bhutan agreed to take in 4000 settlers, although ordinary Bhutanese became increasingly resentful of the Tibetan immigrants because of their refusal to assimilate into Bhutanese culture. In 1974, 28 Tibetans, including the representative of the 14th Dalai Lama in Thimphu, were arrested and accused of a conspiracy to assassinate King Jigme Singye Wangchuck. When the CTA refused to provide evidence of their innocence, relations between Bhutan and Dharamshala soured, and in 1979, the Government of Bhutan announced that any Tibetan in the country that did not take Bhutanese citizenship would be repatriated back to China. Despite the CTA's opposition, 2300 Tibetans applied for the Bhutanese citizenship; most of the remainder re-settled in India.

== See also ==
- List of organizations of Tibetans in exile
- History of Tibet
- Tibet (1912–1951)
- History of Tibet (1950–present)
- 1959 Tibetan uprising
- Tibetan sovereignty debate
- Sinicization of Tibet
- Monument to the Peaceful Liberation of Tibet
- Sino-Tibetan War (1930–1932)
- Incorporation of Xinjiang into the People's Republic of China
- List of military occupations
