= George Bogle (diplomat) =

Scottish adventurer and diplomat

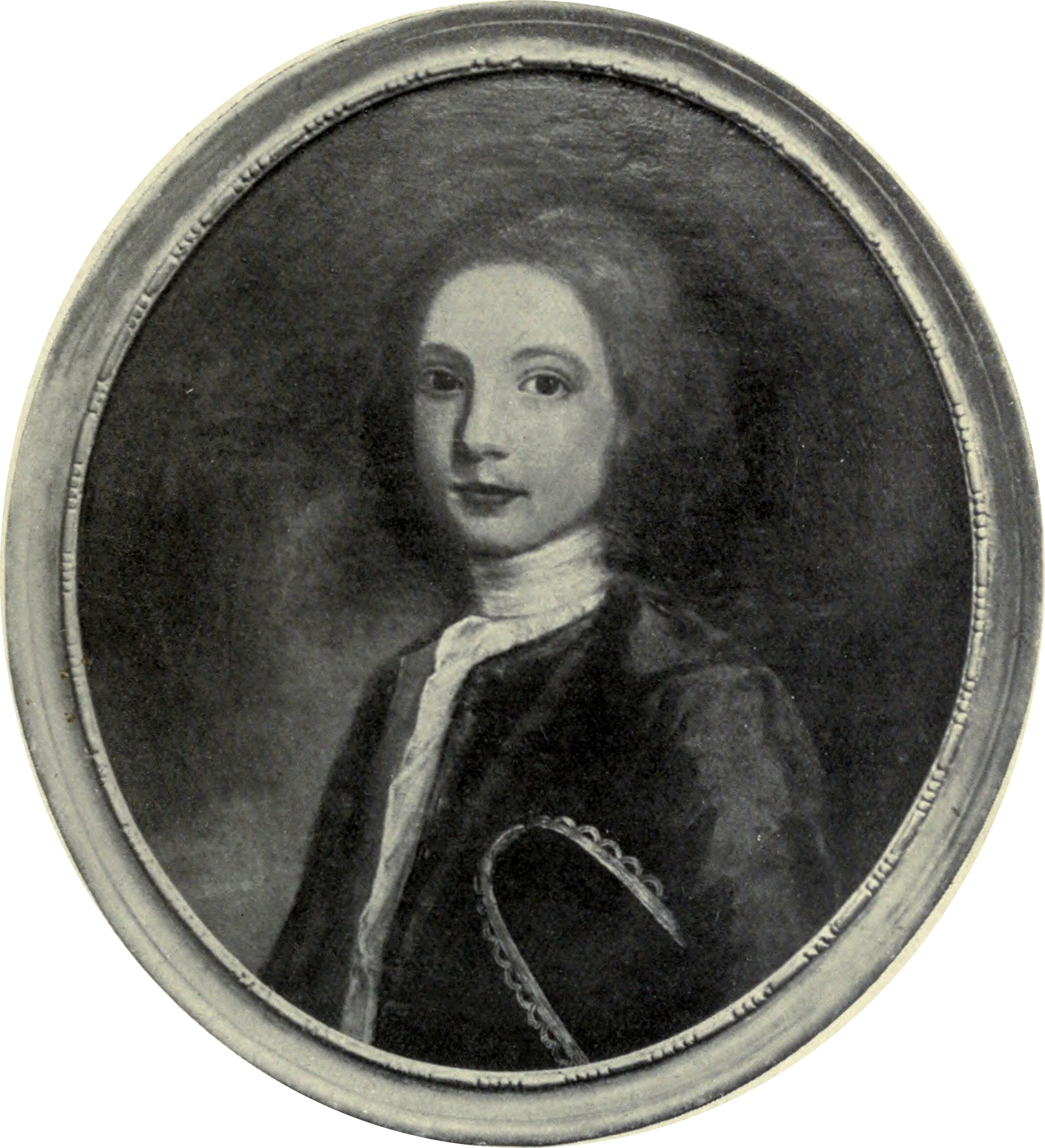
Portrait of George Bogle, late teens

George Bogle (26 November 1746 – 3 April 1781) was a Scottish adventurer and diplomat, the first to establish diplomatic relations with Tibet and to attempt recognition by the Chinese Qing dynasty. His mission is still used today as a reference point in debates between China and Tibetan independence activists.

== Family background ==
George Bogle was the third son of a wealthy Glasgow merchant, George Bogle of Daldowie, one of the Tobacco Lords and Anne Sinclair, a gentlewoman directly descended from James I and James II of Scotland. His father had extensive connections in the Scottish landed, commercial, and governmental elite, as well as trading contacts across the British Empire.

The Scots gentry to whom he belonged were, in turn, in the 18th century, a key feature in the British state. Their political allegiance was often managed through patronage. In particular, Henry Dundas was able to offer the younger sons of gentry opportunities in India. This was to be a significant feature in George's career.

== Education and early career ==
Born in 1746 at the family seat of Daldowie, on the right bank of the Clyde River as the youngest of seven surviving children and the youngest of three brothers, his elder brother John Bogle eventually came to own a plantation in Virginia. His other brother, Robert, after the failure of a business adventure in London (the importing house of "Bogle and Scott"), established a cotton plantation in Grenada. Both these brothers were intimately involved in the Transatlantic slave trade. His four sisters married into their gentry network of traders, lairds and lawyers. His mother died when he was thirteen. The following year he matriculated at Edinburgh University where he studied logic. He completed his education, when he was 18, at a private academy in Enfield, near London. Following this, he spent six months travelling in France. His brother Robert then took him on as a clerk in his London offices of Bogle and Scott where he spent four years as a cashier.

== India ==
Using his family network, he secured an appointment as a writer in the British East India Company (BEIC). In 1770, he landed in Calcutta, the centre of East India Company power in India. His extensive letters home, as well as his journal entries, show him to have been a lively, entertaining and perceptive writer. The comments of his colleagues and others show him to have been an agreeable, indeed playful – if sometimes riotous – companion. These qualities no doubt influenced Warren Hastings, the Governor-General of the BEIC, when he appointed him as his private secretary. His letters show that he was aware of being under suspicion of corruption, and had some misgivings about it – Hastings would soon be impeached for corruption – although Bogle was determined to make his fortune come what may.

== Envoy to Bhutan and Tibet ==
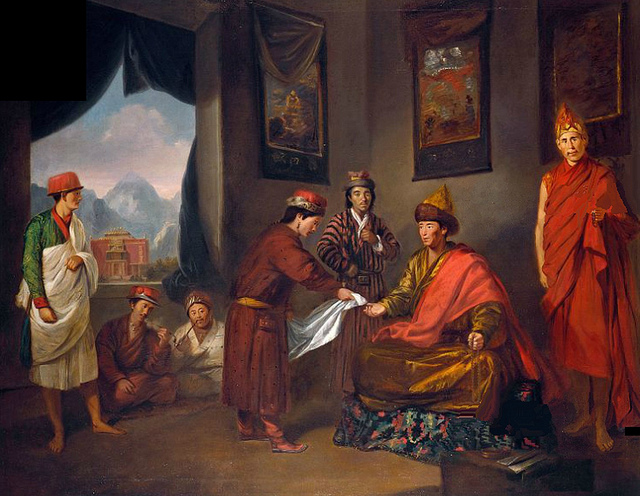
The Sixth Panchen Lama Receives George Bogle at Tashilhunpo, oil painting by Tilly Kettle, c. 1775.

In 1773, Hastings responded to an appeal for help from the Raja of the princely state of Cooch Behar to the north of Bengal, whose territory had been invaded by the Zhidar the Druk Desi of the Kingdom of Bhutan the previous year. Hastings agreed to help on the condition that Cooch Behar recognise British sovereignty. The Raja agreed and with the help of British troops they pushed the Bhutanese out of the Duars and into the foothills in 1773.

Zhidar, the Druk Desi, returned to face civil war at home. His opponent Jigme Senge, the regent for the seven-year-old Shabdrung (the Bhutanese equivalent of the Dalai Lama), had lent his support to popular discontent. Zhidar was unpopular for his corvee tax (he sought to rebuild a major dzong in one year, an unreasonable goal), as well as for his overtures to the Manchu Emperors which threatened Bhutanese independence. Zhidar was soon overthrown and forced to flee to Tibet, where he was imprisoned and a new Druk Desi, Kunga Rinchen, installed in his place. Meanwhile, the Sixth Panchen Lama, who had imprisoned Zhidar, interceded on behalf of the Bhutanese with a letter to Hastings, imploring him to cease hostilities in return for friendship. Hastings saw the opportunity to establish relations with both the Tibetans and the Bhutanese and wrote a letter to the Panchen Lama proposing "a general treaty of amity and commerce between Tibet and Bengal."

Hastings then lost no time in appointing Bogle to undertake a diplomatic and fact-finding mission "to chart the unknown territory beyond the northern borders of Bengal", with a view to opening up trade with Tibet and possibly establishing a back-door trade relationship with the Qing Empire who tightly controlled foreign trade at Canton under the Canton System.

Hastings instructions to Bogle, given on 18 May 1774, were as follows:

"I desire you will proceed to Lhasa ... The design of your mission is to open a mutual and equal communication of trade between the inhabitants of Bhutan [Tibet] and Bengal ... You will take with you samples, for a trial of such articles of commerce as may be sent from this country ... and you will dilligently inform yourself of the manufactures, productions, goods introduced by the intercourse with other countries which are to be procured in Bhutan ... The following will be also proper objects of your inquiry: the nature of the roads between the borders of Bengal and Lhasa and the neighbouring countries, their government, revenue and manners ... The period of your stay must be left to your discretion.

Bogle's expedition set out the same year and consisted of himself, an army surgeon named Alexander Hamilton, and Purangir Gosain (an agent of the Sixth Panchen Lama, the effective ruler of Tibet), as well as a retinue of servants. Despite warnings from the Qing government and the Panchen Lama that he was not allowed to enter Tibet, he made use of the recent political instability in Bhutan and tension between the Panchen Lama and the regent for the 7th Dalai Lama to win access to Tibet where he was brought before the Panchen Lama in Shigatse. Bogle made a favourable impression on the Sixth Panchen Lama and spent six months overwintering in his palaces learning what he could of Tibetan culture and politics. Bogle was struck by the experience, noting in his journal, 'When I look upon the time I have spent among the Hills it appears like a fairy dream.' It may have been the publication of accounts of his journey which established the myth of Tibet as Shangri-la. Bogle helped the Panchen Lama compose his still famous Geography of India.

Returning to India, Bogle fulfilled the Panchen Lama's request, Bhot Bagan Moth was established at Ghusuri in 1776 on the banks of the Ganges, not far from the East India Company headquarters, where Buddhist monks could return to their spiritual roots in India. Although the ultimate goal of establishing a trade route to China was not met, a long-lasting relationship was formed between the British and the Tibetans. The mission to Tibet was viewed as a success, and was commemorated by a 1775 portrait of Bogle being presented (in Tibetan gowns) to the Panchen Lama. This portrait, by Tilly Kettle, a British painter who worked in Calcutta, was reputedly presented by Hastings to King George III and it is now in the Royal Collection.

== Overtures to China ==
The hopes for a breakthrough in China rested on using the Lama as an intermediary with the Qianlong Emperor of the Manchu-led Qing Empire, an astute but aloof ruler who regarded all the world as tributaries. In 1780, Palden Yeshe visited Beijing where he came close to gaining a passport for Bogle. The Qianlong Emperor presented him with a golden urn for use in ceremonial lotteries and the goodwill seemed to suggest that a passport would be issued. However, Bogle was struck down by smallpox, and died that same year. (It was not until 1793 that a British envoy, Lord Macartney was, very sceptically, received by the Qianlong Emperor).

== Death ==
Bogle died, probably of cholera, on 3 April 1781 at age 34, and was buried in South Park Street Cemetery, Calcutta. He had never married, but left behind a son George, and two daughters, Martha and Mary. According to family lore, the girls' mother was Tibetan. The two girls were sent back to Daldowie House, where they were brought up by Bogle's family and eventually married Scotsmen.

== Legacy of Bogle’s mission ==
Bogle's diary and travel notes were found in his Ayrshire family archives and published as "Narratives of the mission of George Bogle to Tibet, and of the journey of Thomas Manning to Lhasa" (1876) by Sir Clements Markham. This edition provided a partial impetus for the Tibetan journeys of Sarat Chandra Das. Das translated and published parts of the Tibetan biography of the Third Panchen Lama, including descriptions of his friendship with Bogle. Some critics have ascribed Bogle and Das as major inspirations for Rudyard Kipling's novel Kim, shown by Kipling's use of the title "Teshoo Lama" (an alternate title of the Panchen Lama used by Bogle and other British sources of the time).

The Chinese government has used the Bogle mission on official websites to suggest that Britain recognised Chinese sovereignty over Tibet. They portray the meeting of the Panchen Lama as one where he kowtowed in submission to the Qianlong Emperor.

== Footnotes ==
Attribution

Henderson, Thomas Finlayson (1886). "Bogle, George" . In Stephen, Leslie (ed.). Dictionary of National Biography. Vol. 5. London: Smith, Elder & Co. p. 302.

== Bibliography ==
- Bernstein, Jeremy (2000). Dawning of the Raj The Life and Trials of Warren Hastings Chapter One, Ivan R Dee, Lanham MD USA ISBN 1-56663-281-1
- Bogle, George, Hamilton, Alexander, and Lamb, Alastair (2002). Bhutan and Tibet: the travels of George Bogle and Alexander Hamilton, 1774–1777. Hertingfordbury: Roxford Books.
- Markham, Clements R. (editor) (1876). Narratives of the Mission of George Bogle to Tibet, and of the Journey of Thomas Manning to Lhasa, edited, with notes, and introduction and lives of Mr Bogle and Mr Manning. London. Reprinted: New Delhi, Manjusri Pub. House, 1971.
- Stewart, Gordon T (2009). Journeys to Empire: Enlightenment, Imperialism and the British Encounter with Tibet, 1774–1904, Cambridge University Press, Cambridge ISBN 978-0-521-51502-3
- Teltscher, Kate. (2004). "Writing home and crossing cultures: George Bogle in Bengal and Tibet, 1770–1775." In: A New Imperial History: Culture, Identity and Modernity in Britain and the Empire, 1660–1840, edited by Kathleen Wilson, Cambridge University Press, Cambridge 2004. ISBN 0-521-00796-8
- Younghusband, Francis (1910). India and Tibet: a history of the relations which have subsisted between the two countries from the time of Warren Hastings to 1910; with a particular account of the mission to Lhasa of 1904. London: John Murray.
