= Neighbourhoods of Coatbridge =

Neighbourhoods in Coatbridge, Scotland

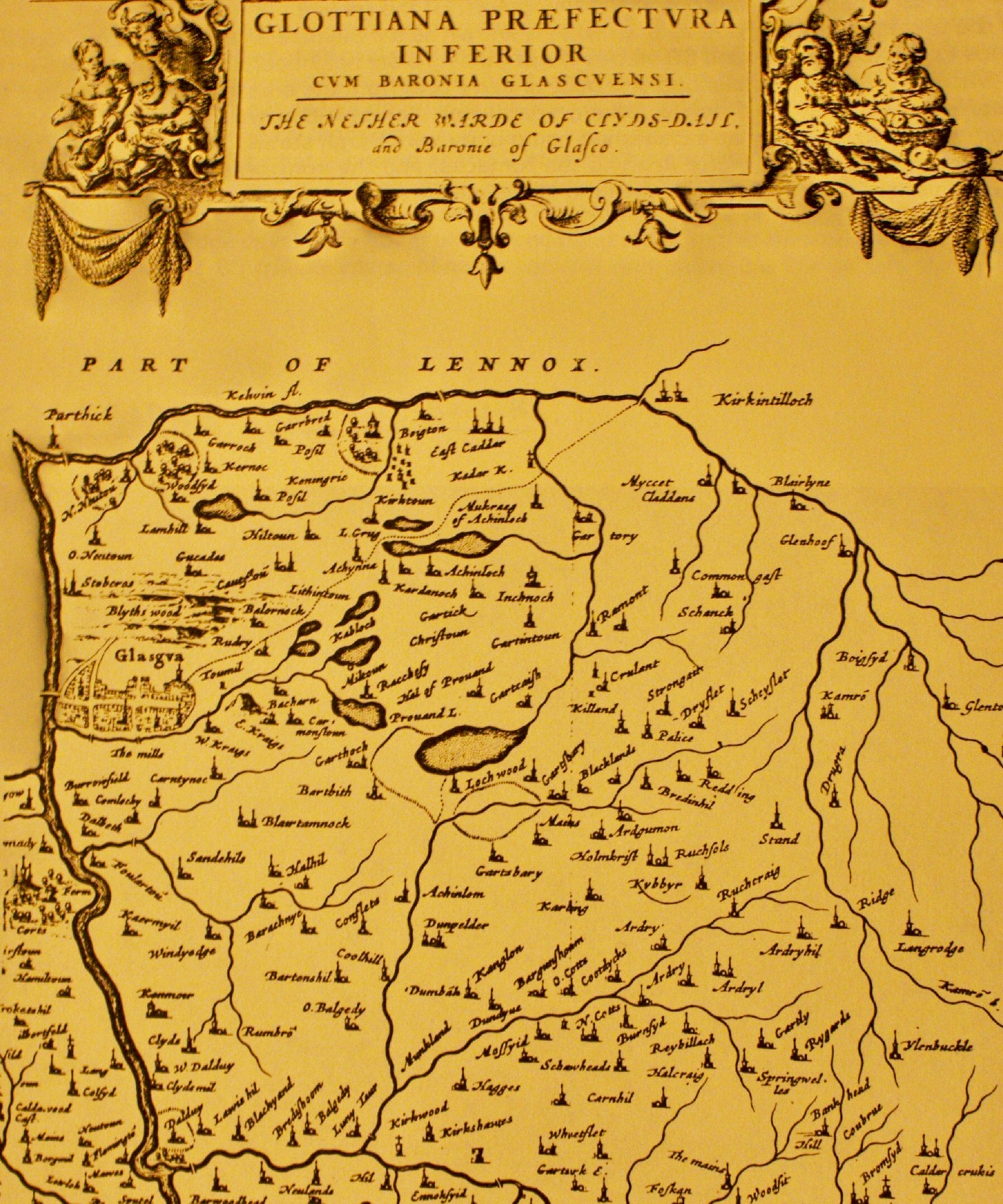
Pont's "Nether Warde of Clyds-dail" map c.1654 which depicts the hamlets of Kirkwood, Dunpelder, Wheatflet, Dunbath, Gartshary in the modern-day Coatbridge area. These all exist as modern-day neighbourhoods in Coatbridge.

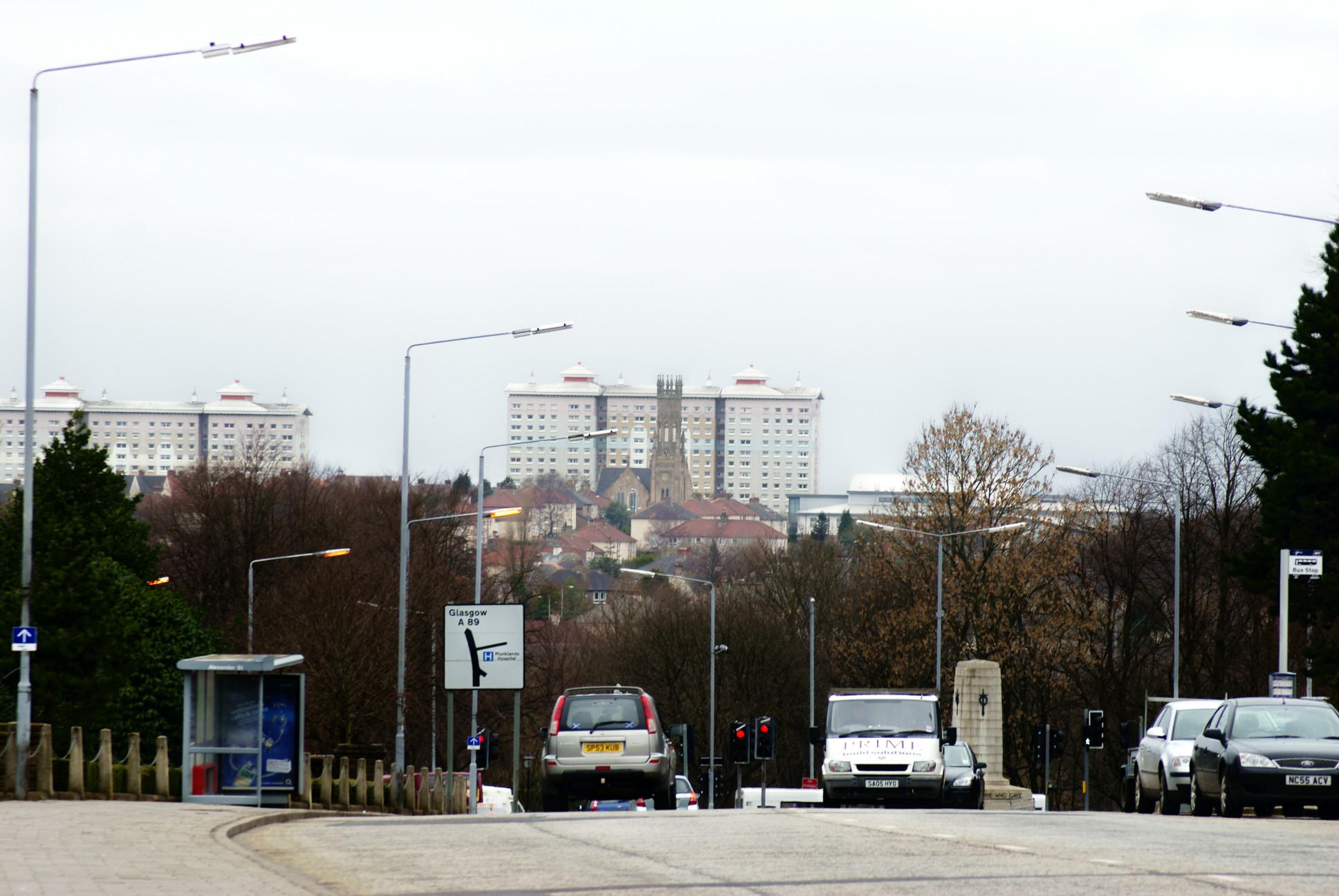
View of the Coatbridge winter skyline

Coatbridge is a town which grew out of a series of 18th-century hamlets on the road between Airdrie and Glasgow. During the 19th century these hamlets grew into the modern-day town of Coatbridge. A number of these hamlets constitute the neighbourhoods of Coatbridge. Overlaid on the older hamlets are modern-day council estates built as a part of programme of social housing construction in the 1930s and 1950s.

There are approximately 27 distinct neighbourhoods associated with Coatbridge. A number of these neighbourhoods overlap geographically.

Generally speaking, Coatbridge's neighbourhoods are working class in composition, although the sandstone buildings of the Drumpellier, Blairhill and Dunbeth areas are regarded as the more affluent areas of Coatbridge.

== List of neighbourhoods in Coatbridge ==
- South Coatbridge
  - Kirkwood
  - Kirkshaws
  - Whifflet
  - Carnbroe
  - Dundyvan
  - Sikeside
  - Rosehall
  - Shawhead
  - Greenend
  - Barrowfield
  - Old Monkland
  - Cuparhead
- North Coatbridge
  - Drumpellier
  - Townhead
  - Espieside
  - Gartsherrie
  - Greenhill
  - Parklands
  - Blairhill
  - Sunnyside
  - Cliftonville
  - Coatdyke
- Central Coatbridge
  - Dunbeth
  - Langloan
  - Summerlee
  - Victoria Park
  - Whitelaw
