= George Bogle of Daldowie =

Scottish merchant

George Bogle of Daldowie (1700–1784) was a Scottish merchant based in Glasgow who was one of the Tobacco Lords. As well as trading in tobacco he dealt in other Caribbean commodities, such as tan and sugar. He was an early partner in the Glasgow Tan Work, and in the Eastern Sugarhouse.

He was Rector of the University of Glasgow three times between 1738 and 1750 and was the father of the young adventurer, George Bogle, private secretary to Warren Hastings, who led the first attempted British embassy from India to Tibet and the Emperor of China in 1774.

== The Bogles ==
George Bogle, Junior, came from an ambitious family which had farmed, rented, tenanted then owned land in the west of Scotland for at least 200 years. They are well documented in the land rolls of the Archbishopric of Glasgow, who owned much of the land to the east of Glasgow. There is a curate, Patrick Bogle, of the "church of Caddir" mentioned in 1509. In 1510,"Thomas Bogyl" of Chedylstoun is mentioned. In 1555, "Isobell Bogyl" is mentioned in relation to "Daldowy Wester" and in 1569, "Wylzem Bogylle" is referred to as having "the lands of Carmyl, callet "Bogylis Hole". After the Reformation the Bogyle seem to have taken over their lands from the church. In 1690, an Act of the Scottish Parliament recorded the return of lands to "Tomas Bogle of Boglehole", after forfeiture (presumably having chosen the wrong side during the Civil Wars).

A George Bogle, senior, died in 1707, and was buried at the east end of Glasgow Cathedral. This was the year of the Parliamentary Union between Scotland and England which opened up both England and English overseas possessions to ambitious Scottish merchants, from which the Bogles profited greatly.

After George Senior, the family divided into three branches – the Shettleston branch, the Daldowie branch and the Carmyle, or Bogleshole branch. Each has a confusing fondness for certain first names — particularly Robert and George — but had (mostly) good fortune in trade and marriages to Scotland's land, commercial and legal elites.

== The Bogles of Daldowie ==
The lands of Easter Daldowie lie 5 miles east of Glasgow between the North Calder Water and the River Clyde . George Senior's father, Robert Bogle, was a considerable Glasgow merchant, having been Dean of Guild twice (in 1661 and 1667). George Senior's son, another Robert, was Dean of Guild in 1728. He purchased Easter Daldowie in 1724. Robert died in 1734 and the George Bogle of this article took possession of Daldowie (and also lands at Whiteinch).

A house is marked at Daldowie on Timothy Pont's manuscript of 1596, published in 1654 at Amsterdam but this was not suitable for a man of George Senior's status. By 1745 he had erected in its stead a magnificent mansion (later much extended). In that year, Bonnie Prince Charlie was in Glasgow with his army and on Christmas Day sent a George (like most of the local gentry, reluctant to support this rebellion) a demand for hay, oats and straw for his horses "under pain of military execution". The Highlanders who came to collect the supplies, also stole some horses and abused George's servants. George complained to the Prince, and received from him, on the 29th, a warrant "to protect and defend the estate, house and horses of George Bogle, Jnr, of Daldowie". Later, the family went to Bothwell Bridge to see the Prince and his army pass. George's elder daughter described Charles as "a fine looking young man, with long fair hair".

George Bogle of Daldowie married Anne Sinclair (connected to an influential Lord of Session – and, distantly, to Oliver Cromwell) – in 1731, by whom he had three sons and four daughters. The youngest son was a third George Bogle, (born 1747) who used family connections, and the influence of Henry Dundas, to get a position as private secretary to Warren Hastings of the British East India Company. This latter George Bogle was asked by Warren Hastings to lead an expedition from Calcutta to Tibet in an effort to get the Lama to persuade the Chinese Emperor to establish ties with Britain. He established good relations with the Lamas and even had two daughters, Martha and Mary, by a princess of Tibet, one of the Lama's daughters. These two daughters were later sent to Scotland to be educated. Bogle's diary was later sent by Warren Hastings to Dr Samuel Johnson in London to be published. He died, young and unmarried, in Calcutta in 1781.

Academic offices
| Preceded by Colin Campbell of Blythswood | Rector of the University of Glasgow; 1738–1740 | Succeeded by John Graham of Dugalston |
| Preceded by John Orr of Barrowfield | Rector of the University of Glasgow; 1743–1746 | Succeeded by John Maxwell of Pollock |
| Preceded by John Maxwell of Pollock | Rector of the University of Glasgow; 1748–1750 | Succeeded by John Maxwell of Pollock |
