= Daldowie Dovecot =

Coordinates: 55°50′27″N 4°07′44″W

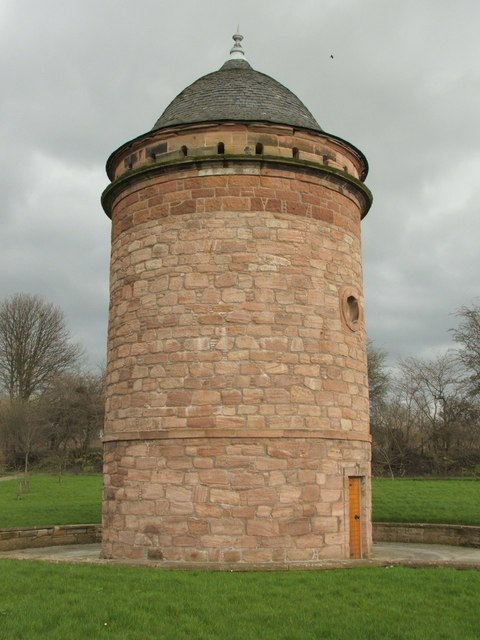
Daldowie dovecote at Hamilton Road (2005)

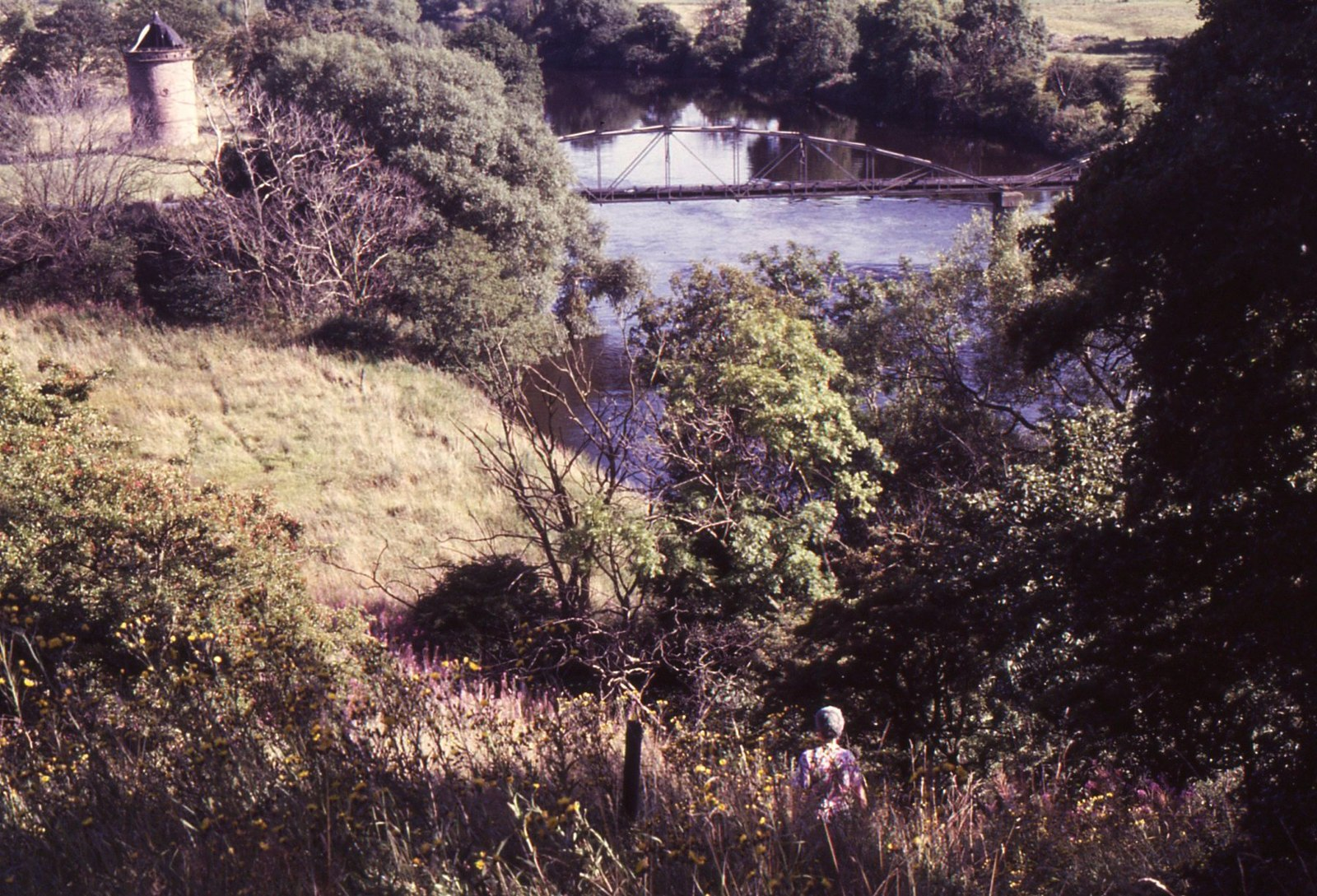
The 'doocot' at its original site at Daldowie overlooking the River Clyde (1987)

The Daldowie Dovecot is a Category A listed dovecote in Glasgow, Scotland. It was built in the mid-18th century on the north bank of the River Clyde, in the grounds of the former Daldowie House estate. It stood isolated for several decades within the grounds of Daldowie Sewage Works, and was dismantled and re-erected in its present location on the A74 Hamilton Road (south of Mount Vernon) in 2000, at a cost of £500,000.
