= Calderbank =

Coordinates: 55°50′35″N 3°58′06″W

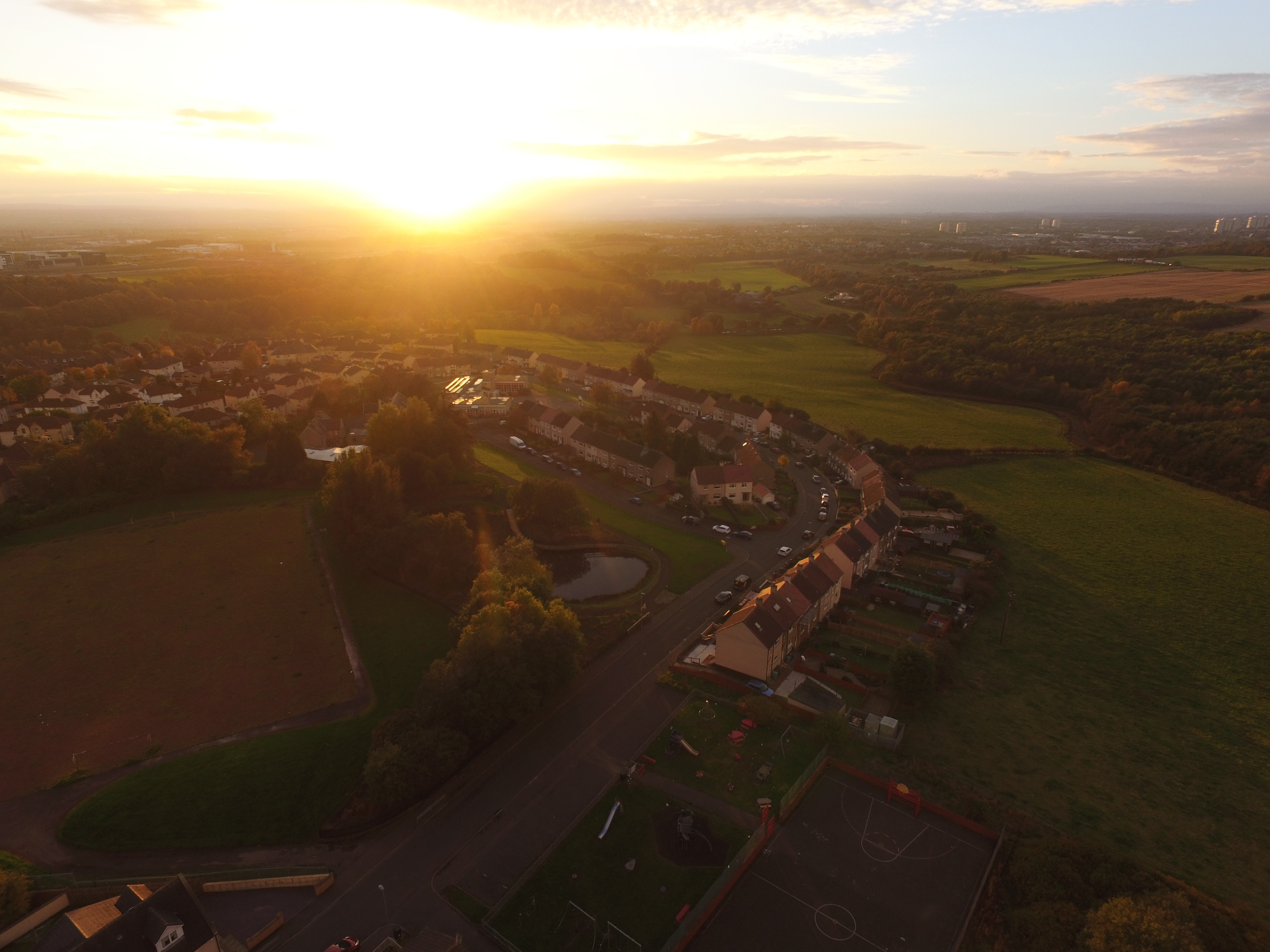
- Calderbank at sunset.

- Location within North Lanarkshire
- Population: 1,560 (2020)
- Council area: North Lanarkshire
- Country: Scotland
- Sovereign state: United Kingdom
- Post town: AIRDRIE
- Postcode district: ML6
- Dialling code: 01236
- Police: Scotland
- Fire: Scottish
- Ambulance: Scottish

Calderbank is a village outside the town of Airdrie, North Lanarkshire, Scotland. It lies east of the M73, on the west bank of the North Calder Water. The village lies 13 miles (21 km) east of Glasgow city centre and around 34 miles (55 km) west of Edinburgh. Other nearby towns include: Airdrie (2.5 miles (4.0 km)), Coatbridge (4 miles (6.4 km)), Bellshill (4 miles (6.4 km)) and Motherwell (5 miles (8.0 km)). It has a population of about 1,560 (2020)

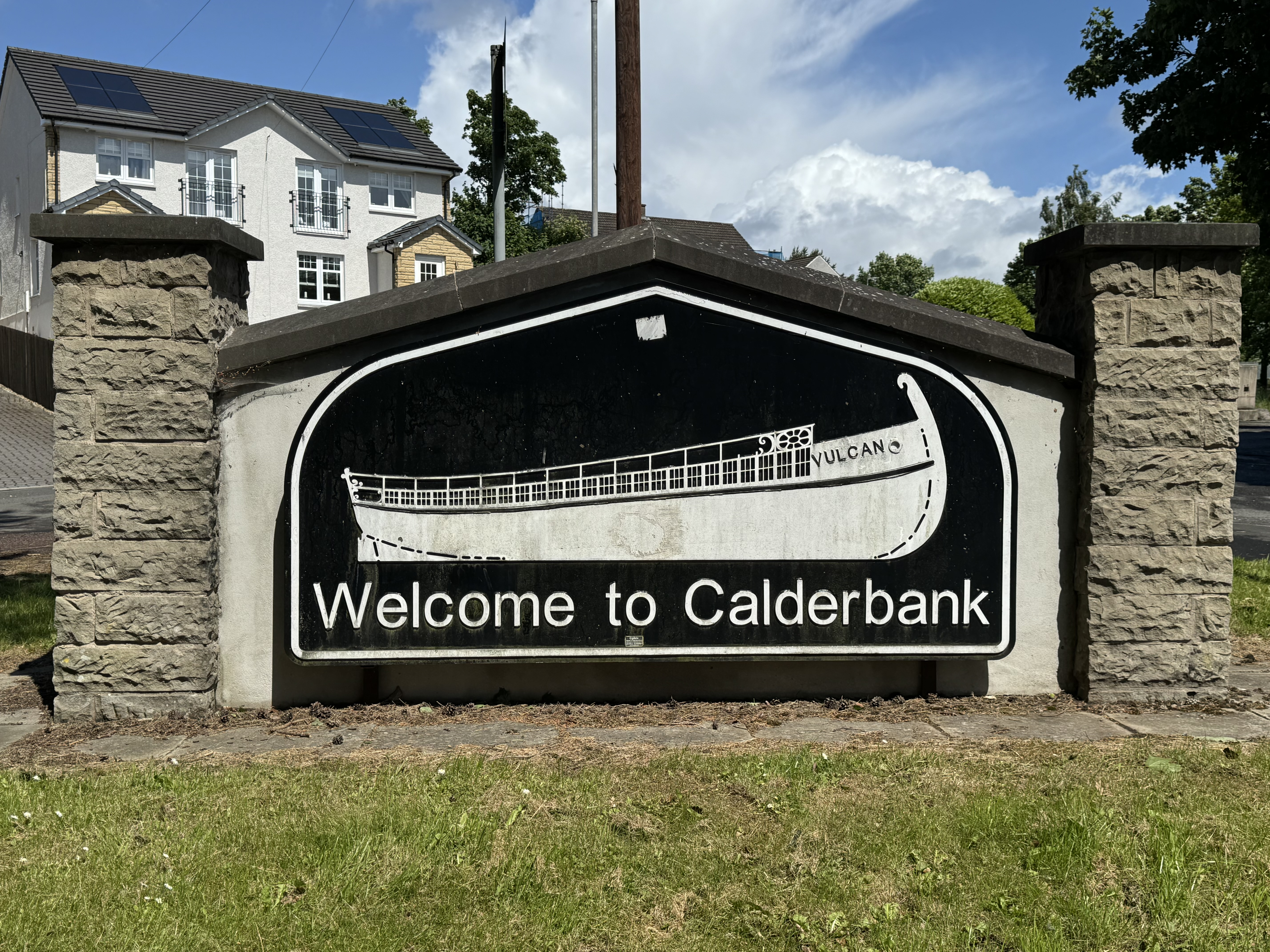
‘Welcome to Calderbank’ depicting the Vulcan.

The village has two small convenience shops; a post office; a fish and chip shop; Kebab shop; Ice Cream shop; a pub; bowls club and community centre. The village has a primary school for ages 4-11 years old. Notable figures in Calderbank include Mohammed Jamil (1954-2024), nicknamed “Charlie” by locals, who served the village for 39 years as the beloved shopkeeper.

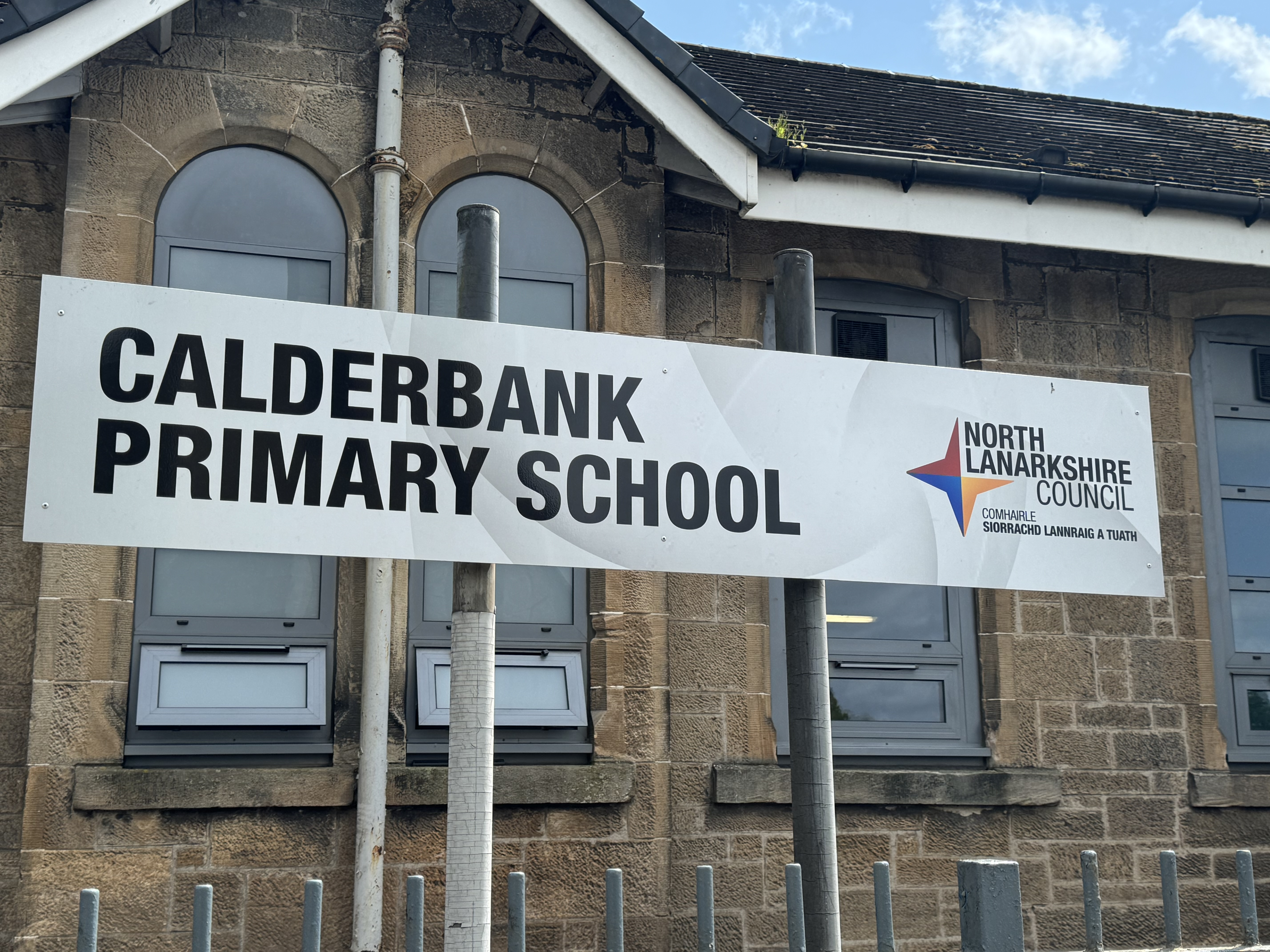
Primary School in the Village of Calderbank

The village also has a church, which has no churchyard.

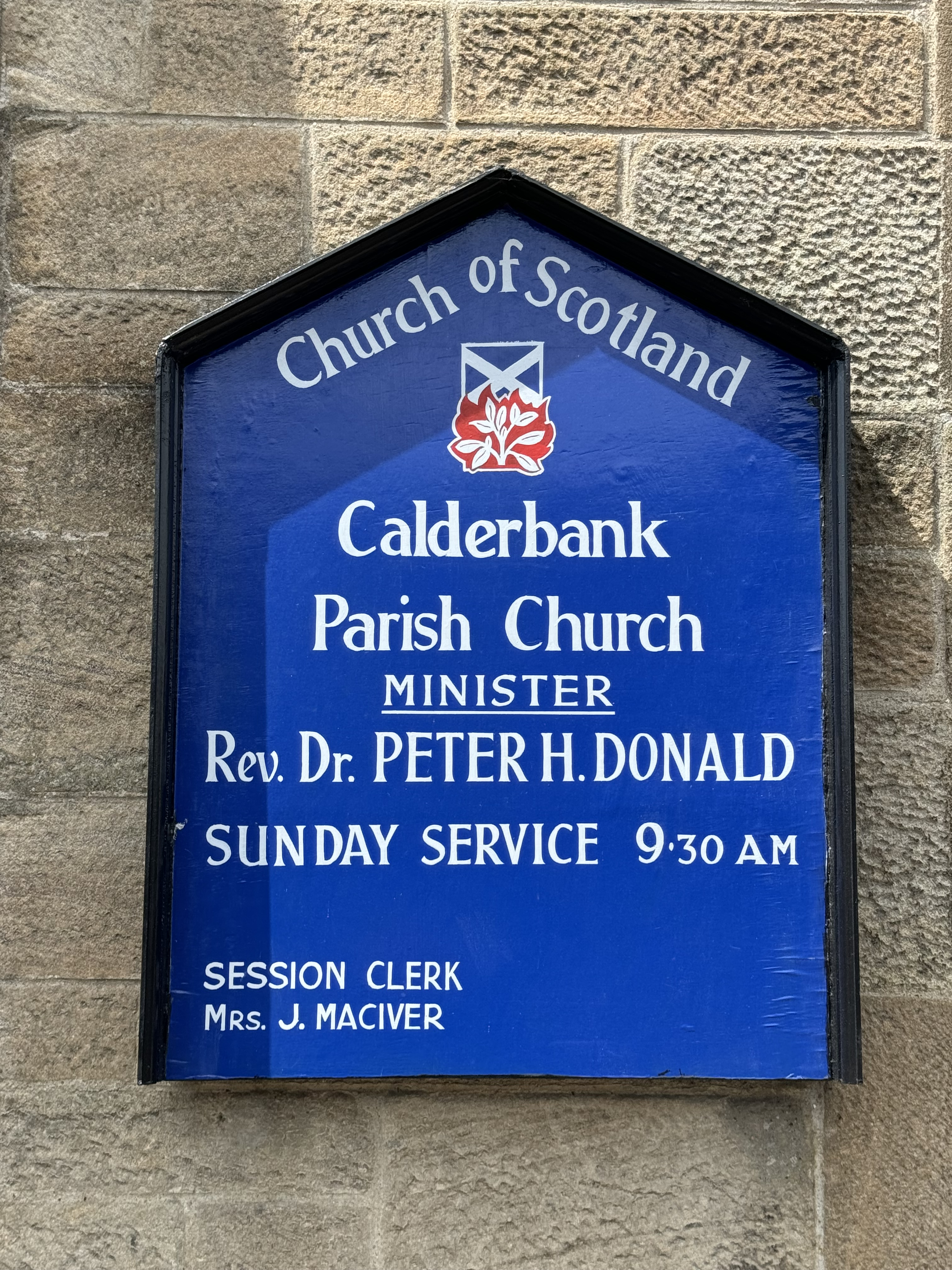
Calderbank Village Church

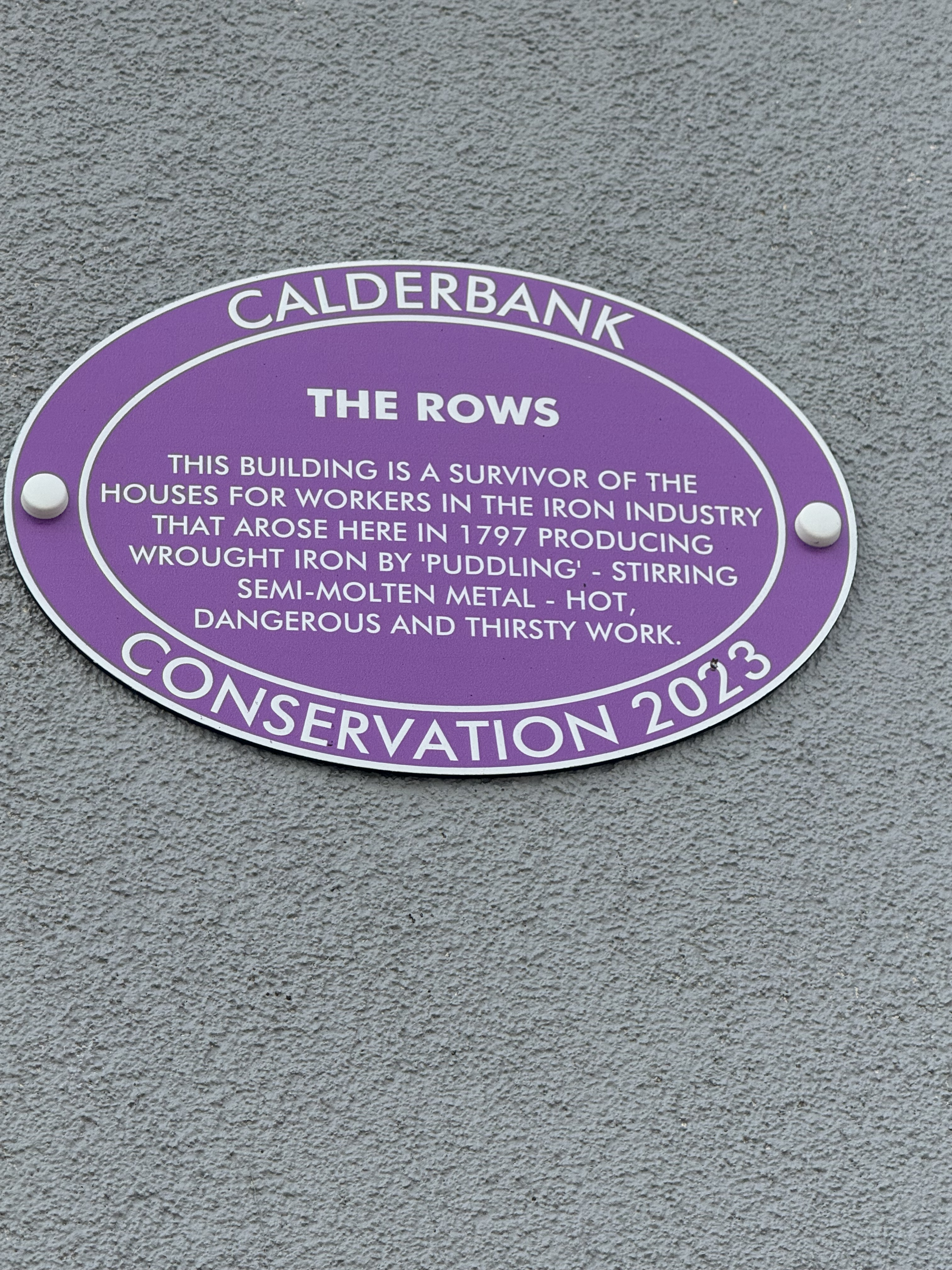
House for workers sign

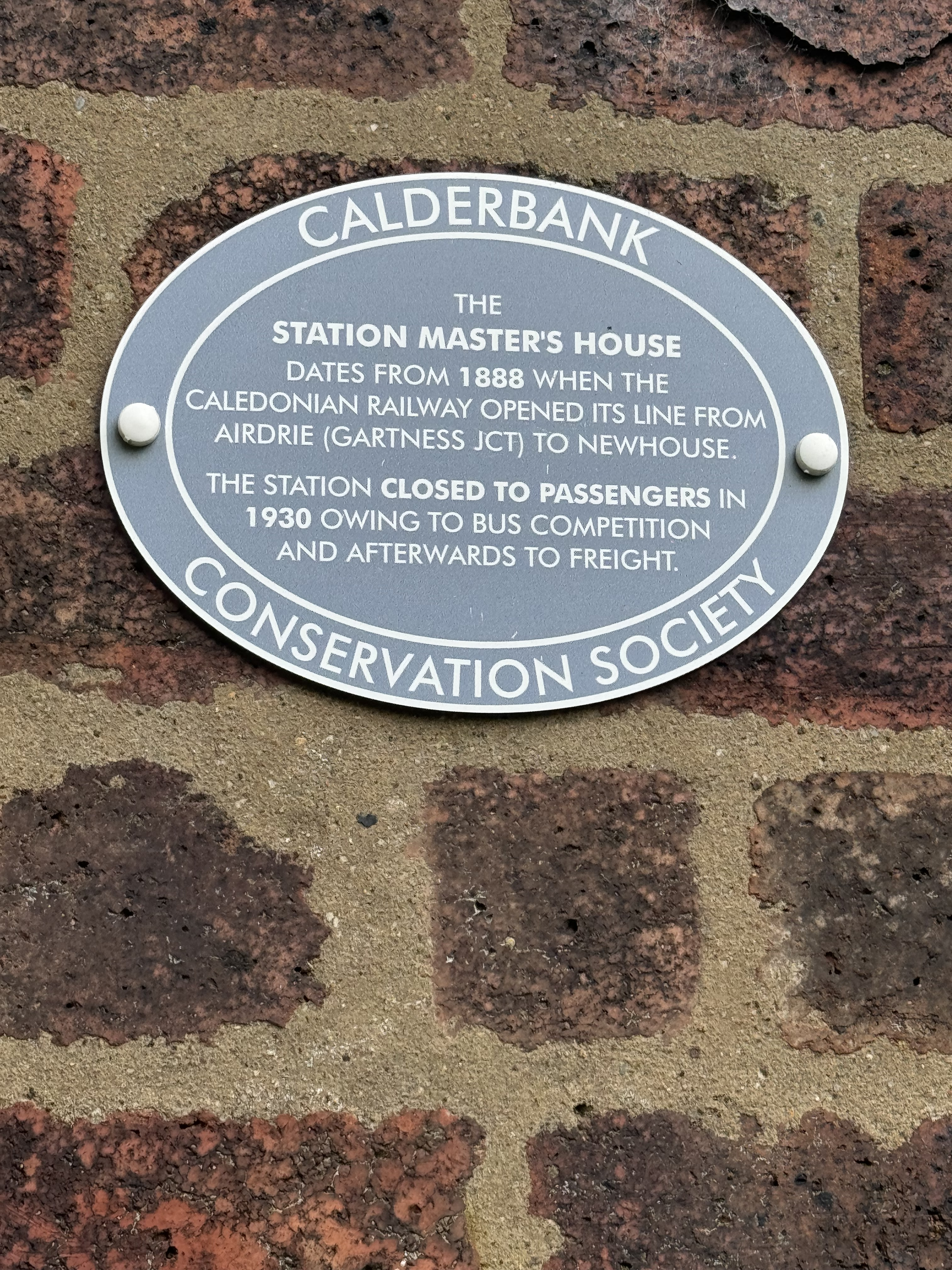
Station Masters house

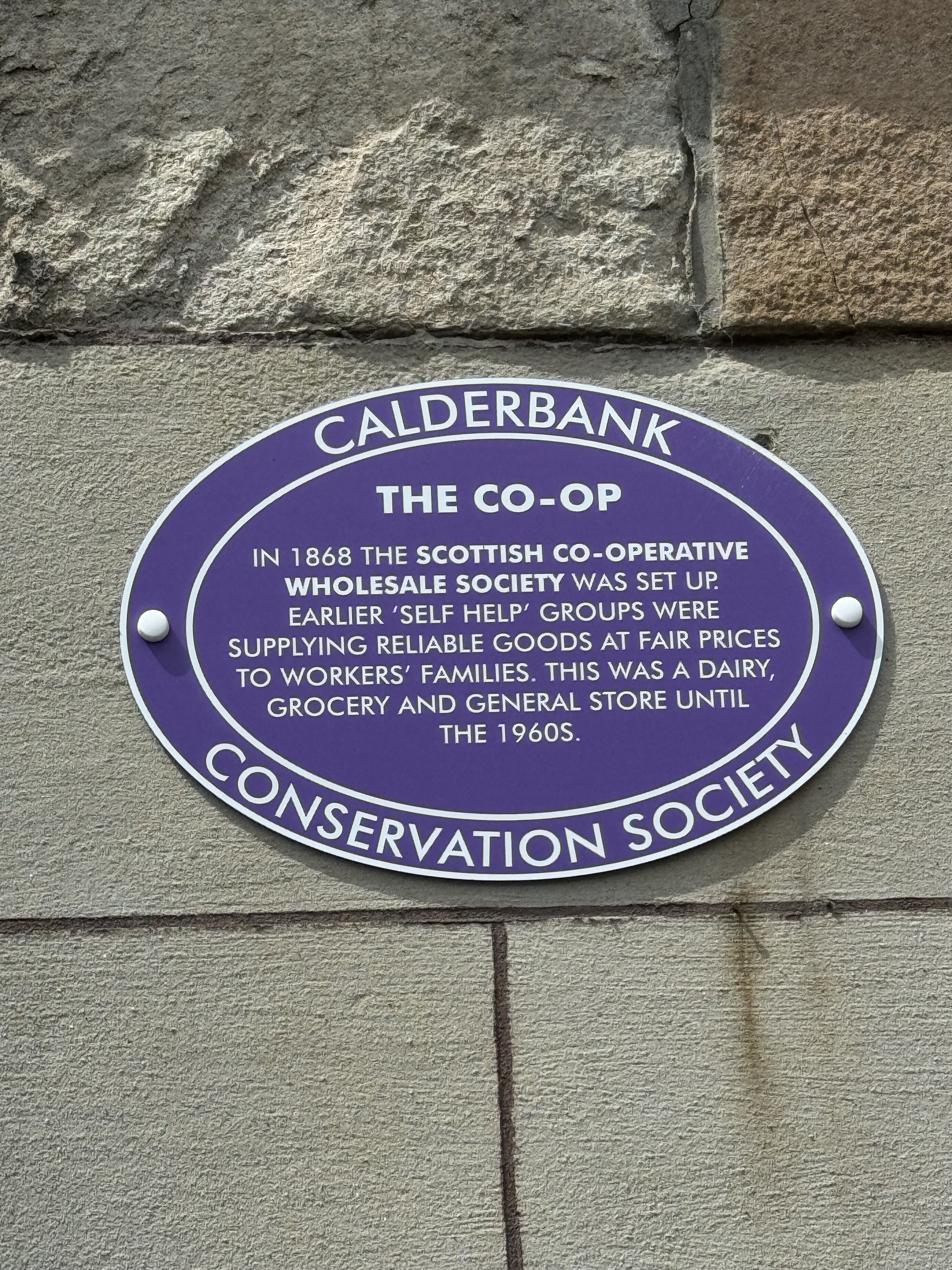
The Co-Operative Wholesale Society

== Etymology ==
The village's name is of a doubtful etymology. The first part of the name refers to the North Calder Water, the small river that flows through the village: however the second element is unknown. Some sources suggest the second element is from Old English benc "bench". A record of the name from 1182 as Celdrebec suggests this.

== History ==
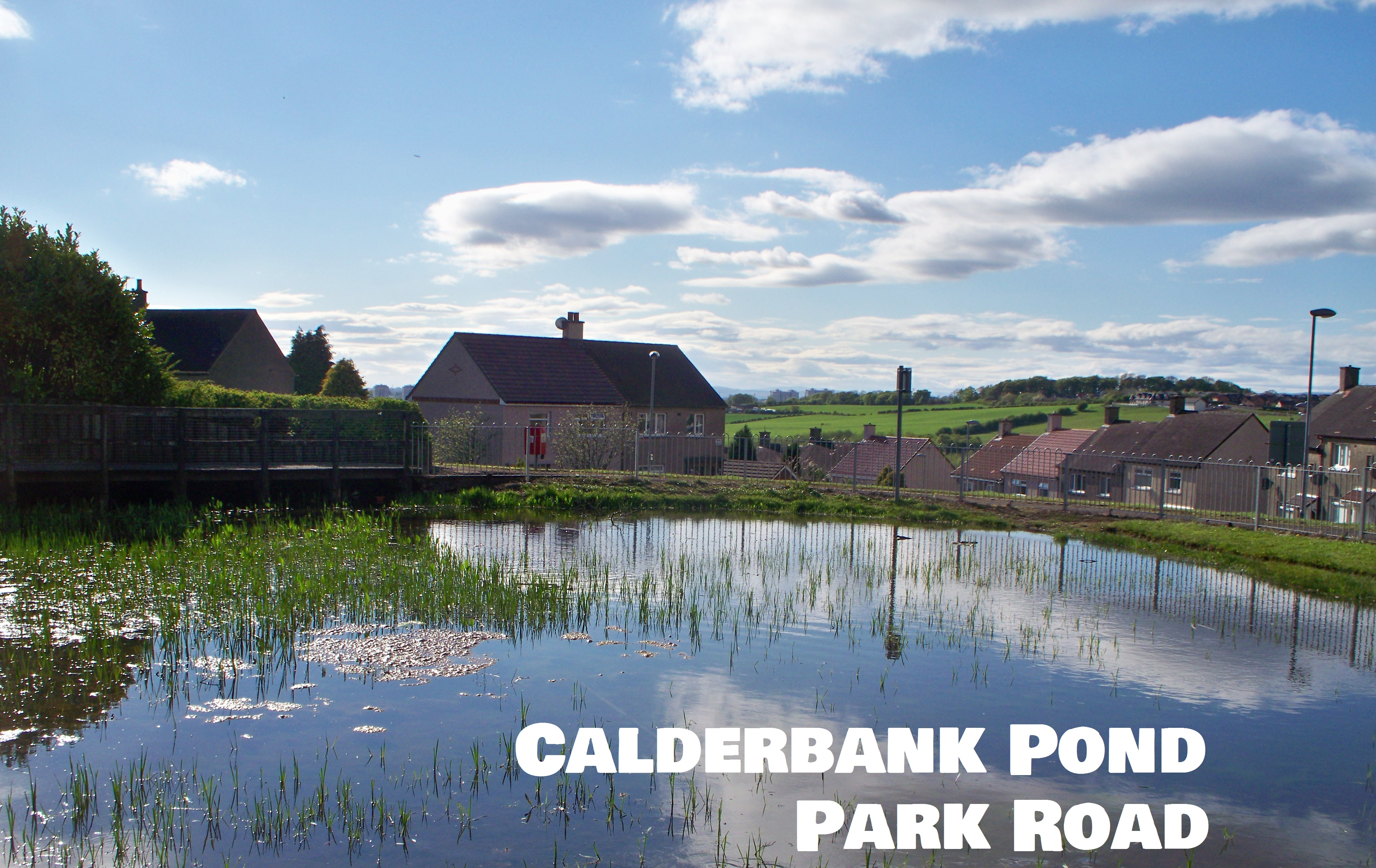
Calderbank pond (Park Road)

The village is famous for being the birthplace of the Vulcan, the world's first iron boat, which sailed from Calderbanks Iron Works to the River Clyde and plied the Scottish canals first with passengers and then with cargoes of iron and coal.

The Vulcan is depicted on the ‘Welcome to Calderbank’ sign as you enter the village.

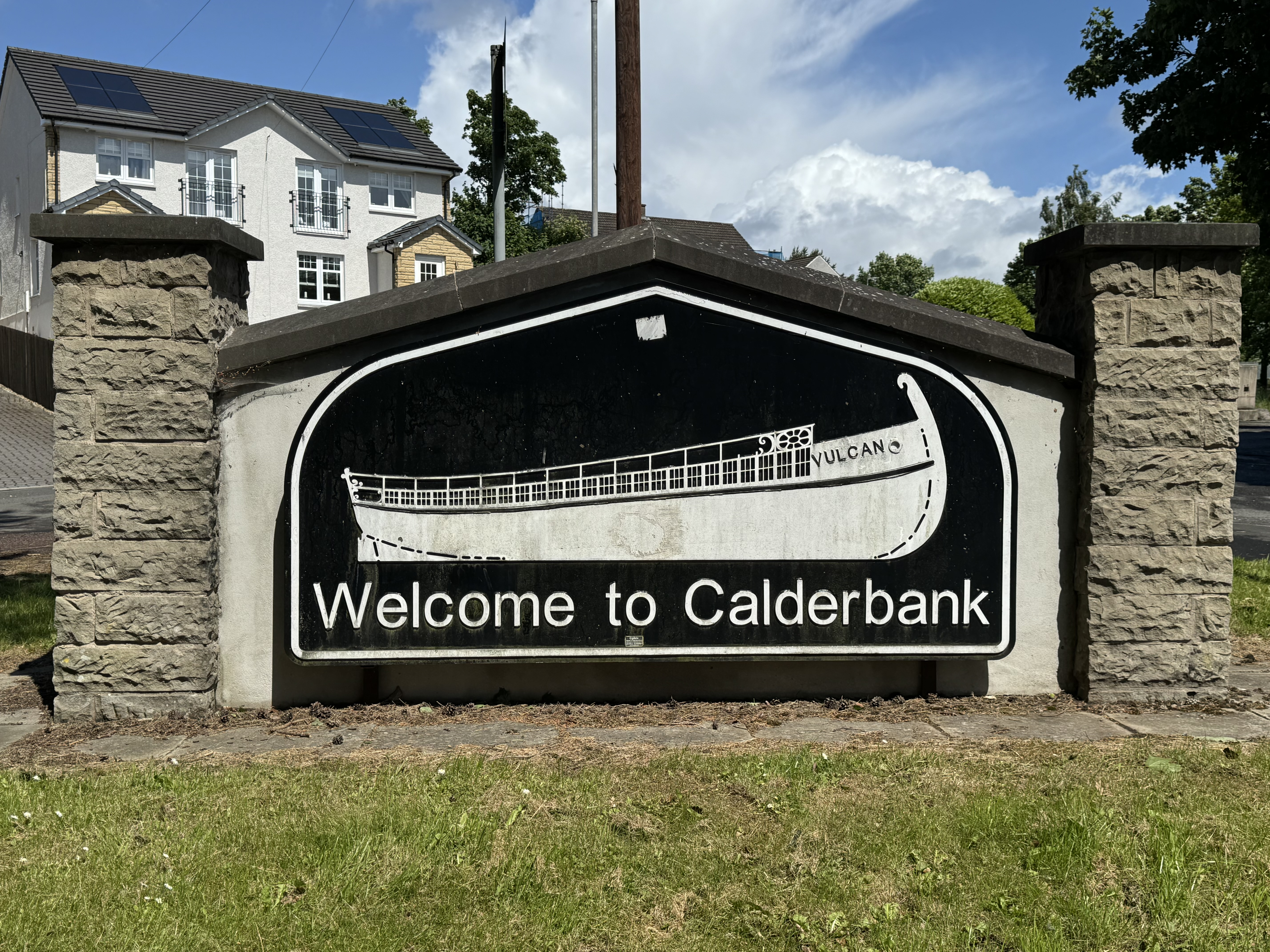
Calderbank welcome sign

Iron from the Calderbanks works was used to build the Queen Mary cruise liner. The Monkland Canal was extended to the west of the village in the late 18th century and was used as a route to transport coal to Port Dundas in Glasgow 12 miles (19.3 km) away. This part of the canal has been preserved between the village and Sikeside on the outskirts of Coatbridge. And other parts of the canal can be seen in Coatbridge town centre and Drumpelier country park, however much of the canal was covered in the 1950s and 1960s by the M8 motorway which actually runs with the meanders of what was the canal (yet under the motorway large pipes still run water which feed the Forth and Clyde canal today).

Calderbank was the site of early Christian settlement, by monks from Newbattle Abbey in the Borders. This gave the local area the name of Monklands.

Many local residents of Calderbank fought in the First World War 1914-1918. They are commemorated on the village war memorial. Individuals include Helen McKenzie; a nurse and only female resident of Calderbank to be killed in the First World War. Her name is present on the war memorial in the village. Also included are Francis Murray and George Murray; aged 15 and 16 who lied about their age in order to serve their country in the First World War. Both names are present on the war memorial in the village.

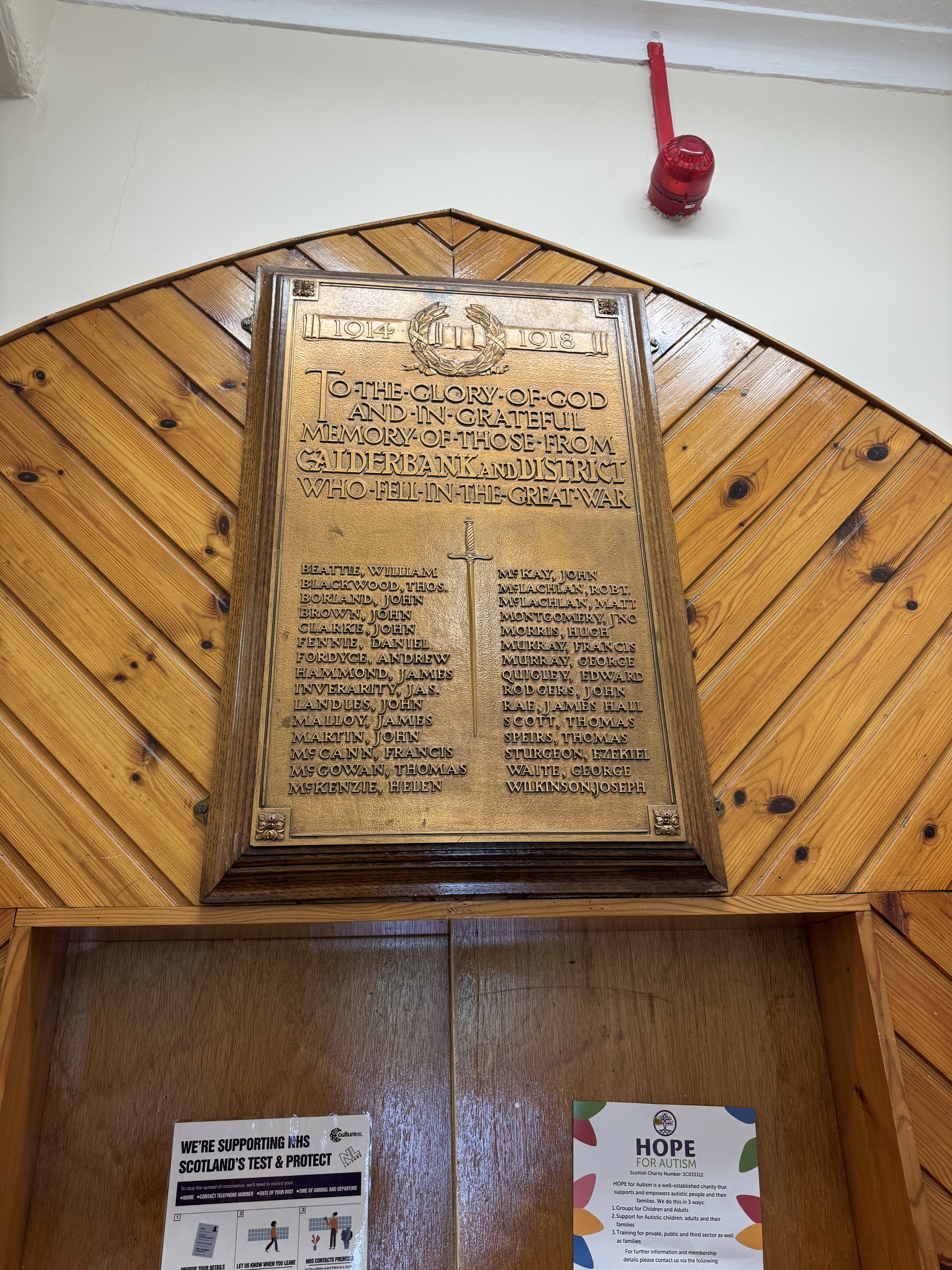
Calderbank memorial in the community centre

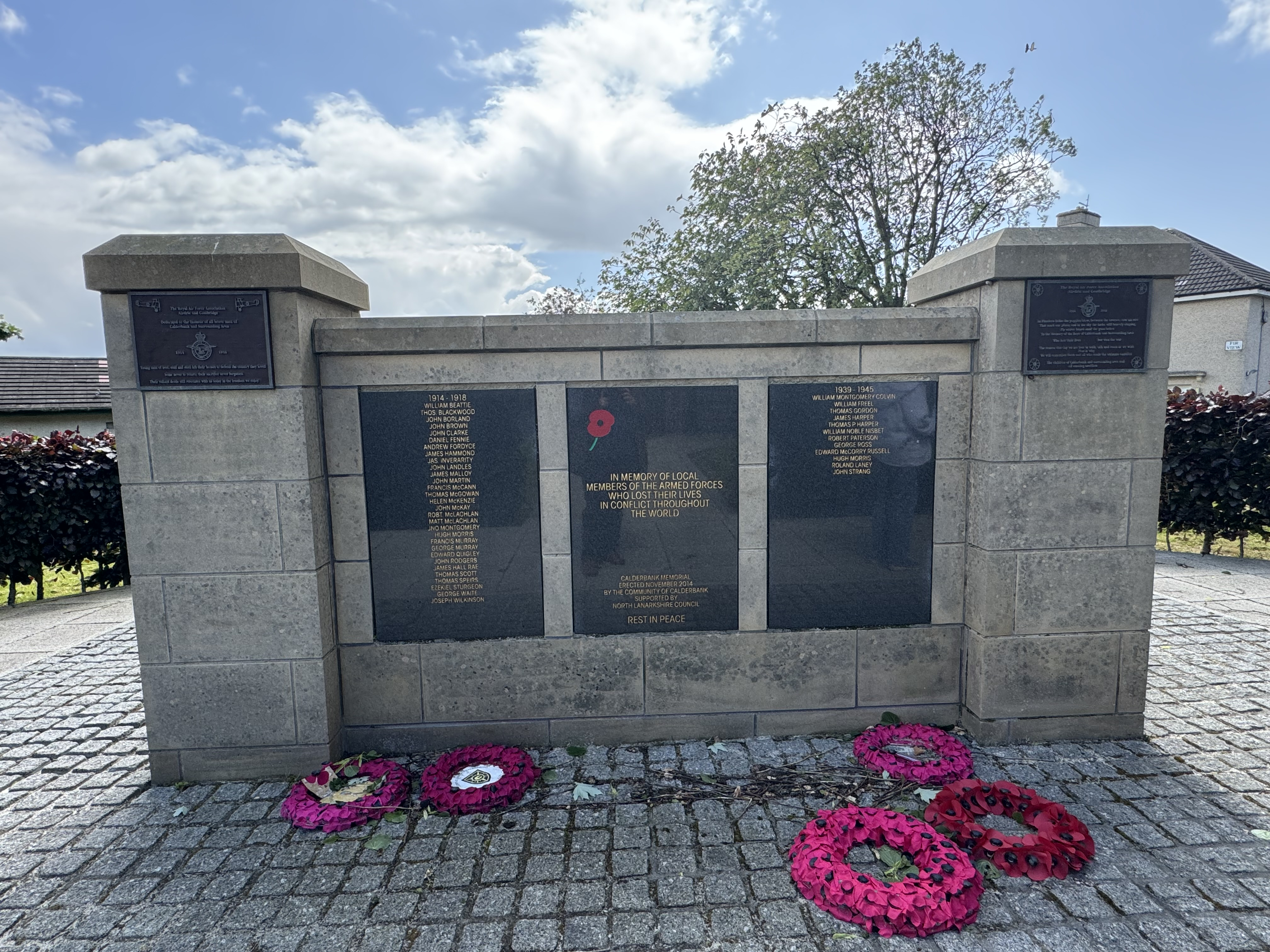
Calderbank war memorial

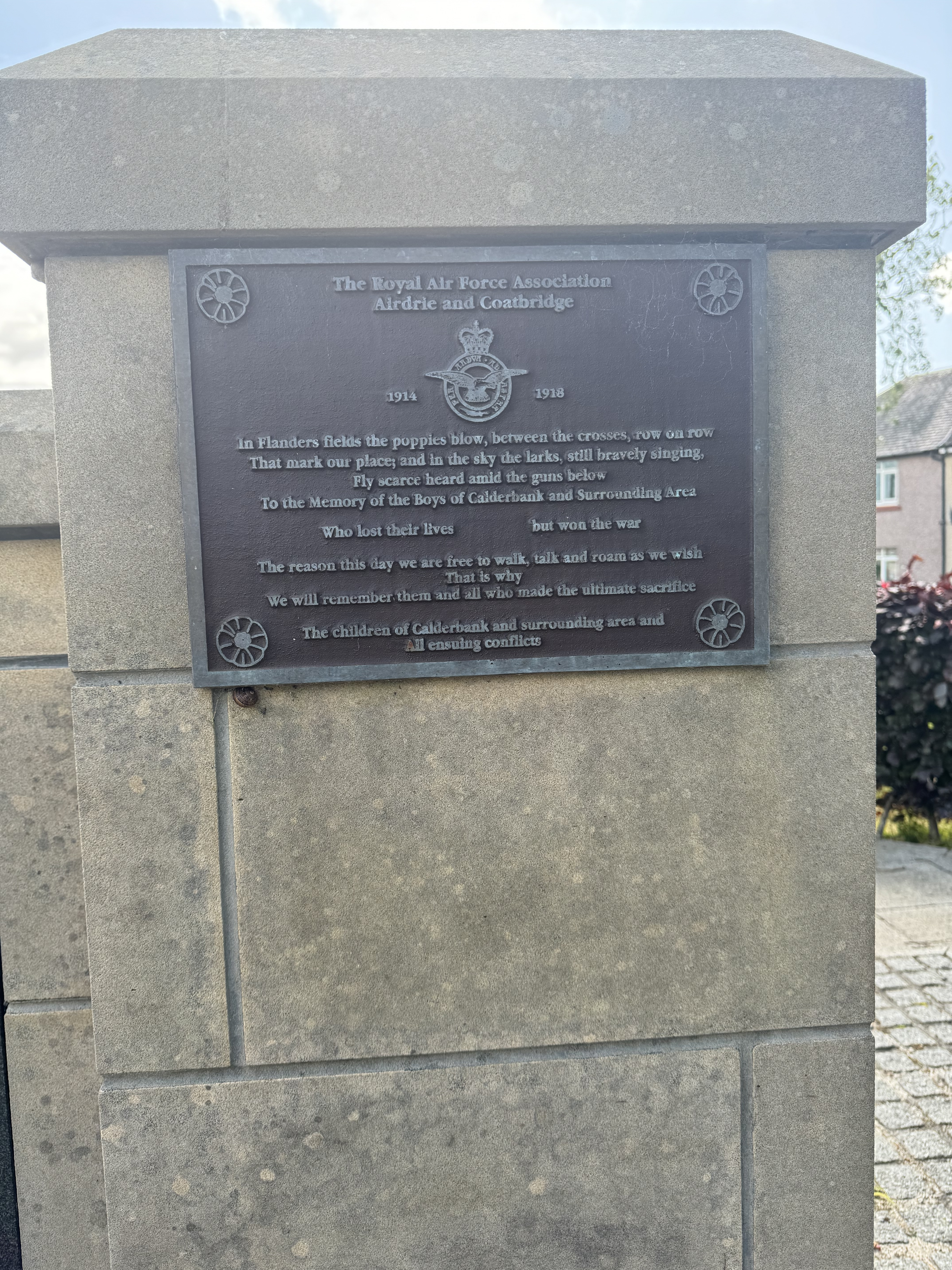
Calderbank war memorial

== Bibliography ==
Calderbank: an industrial and social history
