= Daldowie =

Area of Glasgow, Scotland

Coordinates: 55°49′56″N 4°06′47″W

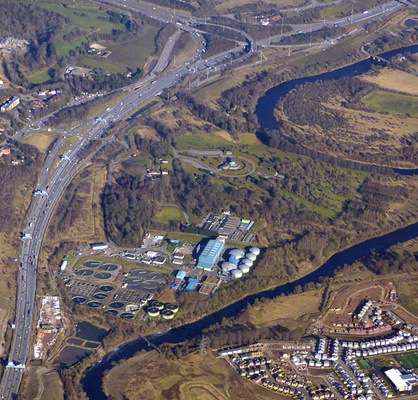
Aerial view of Daldowie, showing WWT works and crematorium – modern housing at Newton on the opposite bank of the Clyde (2018)

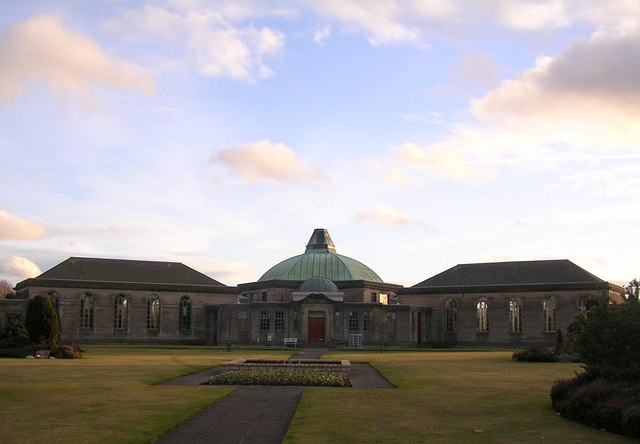
Daldowie Crematorium

The lands of Daldowie in Glasgow, Scotland lie astride the River Clyde on the south and the North Calder Water to the east (marking the boundary with South Lanarkshire), and stretch to the present area of Broomhouse in the north (on the opposite side of the M74 motorway, with both areas served by Junction 3A).

== Daldowie Crematorium and House ==
Daldowie Crematorium was constructed in 1952 by Lanarkshire County Council and opened in 1955, on the grounds of the historic Daldowie House – home of the Stewarts of Minto and George Bogle of Daldowie. His son, George Bogle the younger made an expedition to Tibet as the first British envoy to China. An elegant house was built in the 1730s and extended in the 1830s by a local ironmaster, John Dixon; of which only the dovecote survived. It was one of a string of estates strung out along the River Clyde from Dalmarnock–, through Westthorn and Dalbeth to Easterhill, which went from being country seats in the 18th century, through an exploitation of their iron and coal deposits in the 19th century, to the commercial and residential uses which predominate today; aside from the crematorium and its garden grounds, the area is now dominated by a waste water treatment works, including a waste-to-fuel facility which produces biomass briquettes from the sewage solids.

== See also ==
- Daldowie Dovecot
