= Carnbroe =

Neighbourhood in Coatbridge, Scotland

Coordinates: 55.847°N 4.002°W

Carnbroe is a neighbourhood in Coatbridge, North Lanarkshire, Scotland.

The village is situated by the North Calder Water and was formerly the site of an ironworks.
