= North Calder Water =

River in Scotland

Coordinates: 55°49′53″N 4°06′36″W

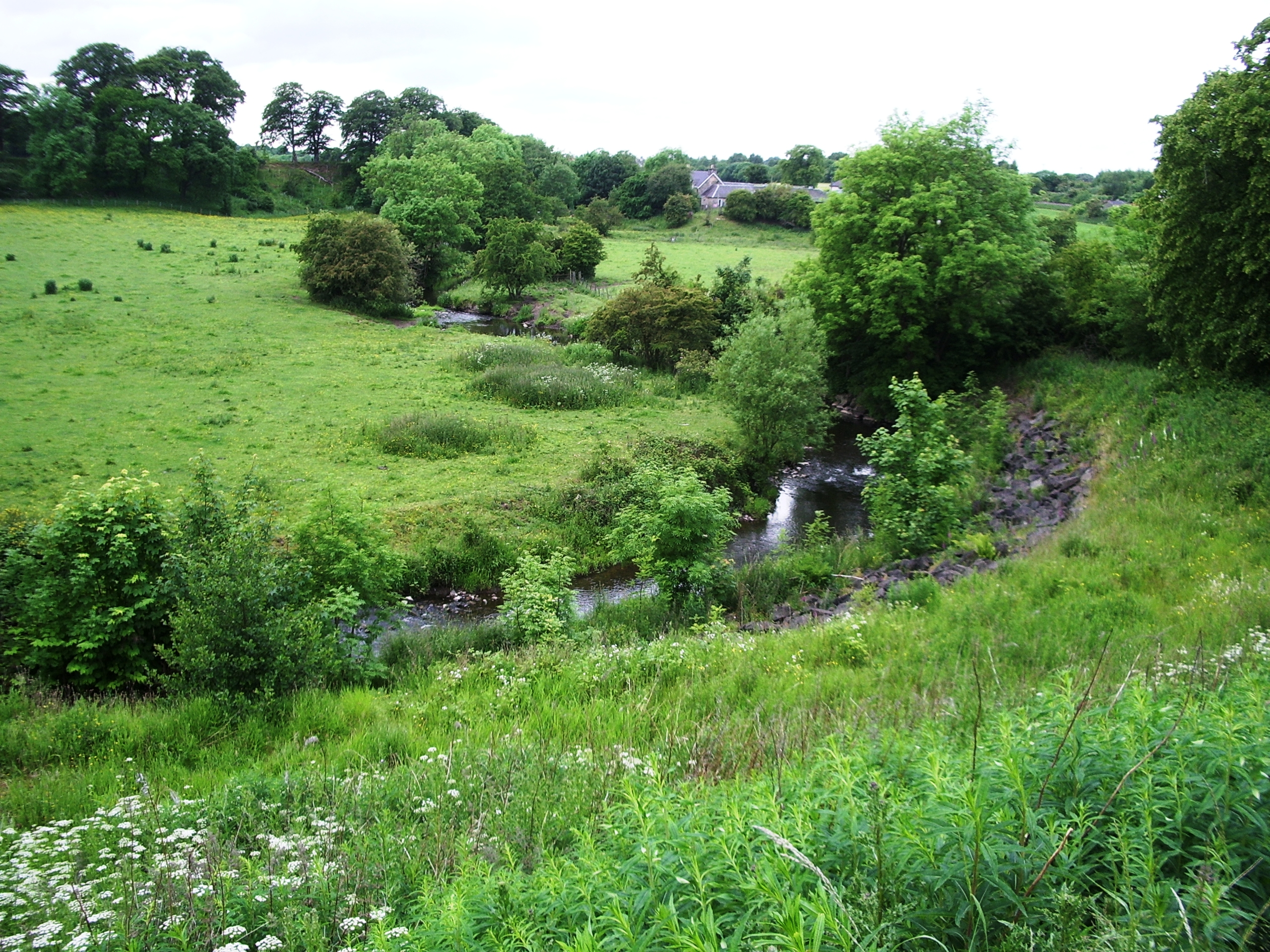
North Calder Water as seen from the Monkland Canal tow path

The North Calder Water is a river in North Lanarkshire, Scotland. It flows for 12 miles (19 km) from the Black Loch (in the Falkirk council area) via the Hillend Reservoir, Caldercruix, Plains, Airdrie, Calderbank, the Carnbroe, Sikeside and Shawhead areas of Coatbridge and Viewpark to the River Clyde at Daldowie, south-east of Glasgow. For the last two miles (three kilometres) of its course, it forms part of the boundary between North Lanarkshire (near to Birkenshaw) and Glasgow (near to Broomhouse). The name Calder is thought to be Brythonic and to mean 'hard cold flowing' water.

In addition to Caldercruix and Calderbank settlements, the river is referenced in man-made features near its course, including Caldervale High School in Airdrie, Calderbraes Golf Club near Birkenshaw, Calderview Community Centre in Coatbridge, and the former Calderbank House and Calderpark Zoo at Broomhouse.

== See also ==
- South Calder Water, also flows through North Lanarkshire to the Clyde from near Shotts to Strathclyde Park
- Rotten Calder, flows through South Lanarkshire from near Eaglesham to Newton, its mouth on the south bank almost opposite that of the North Calder
