= Bhot Bagan Moth =

Tibetan Buddhist Temple in West Bengal

Coordinates: 22.6147°N 88.3577°E

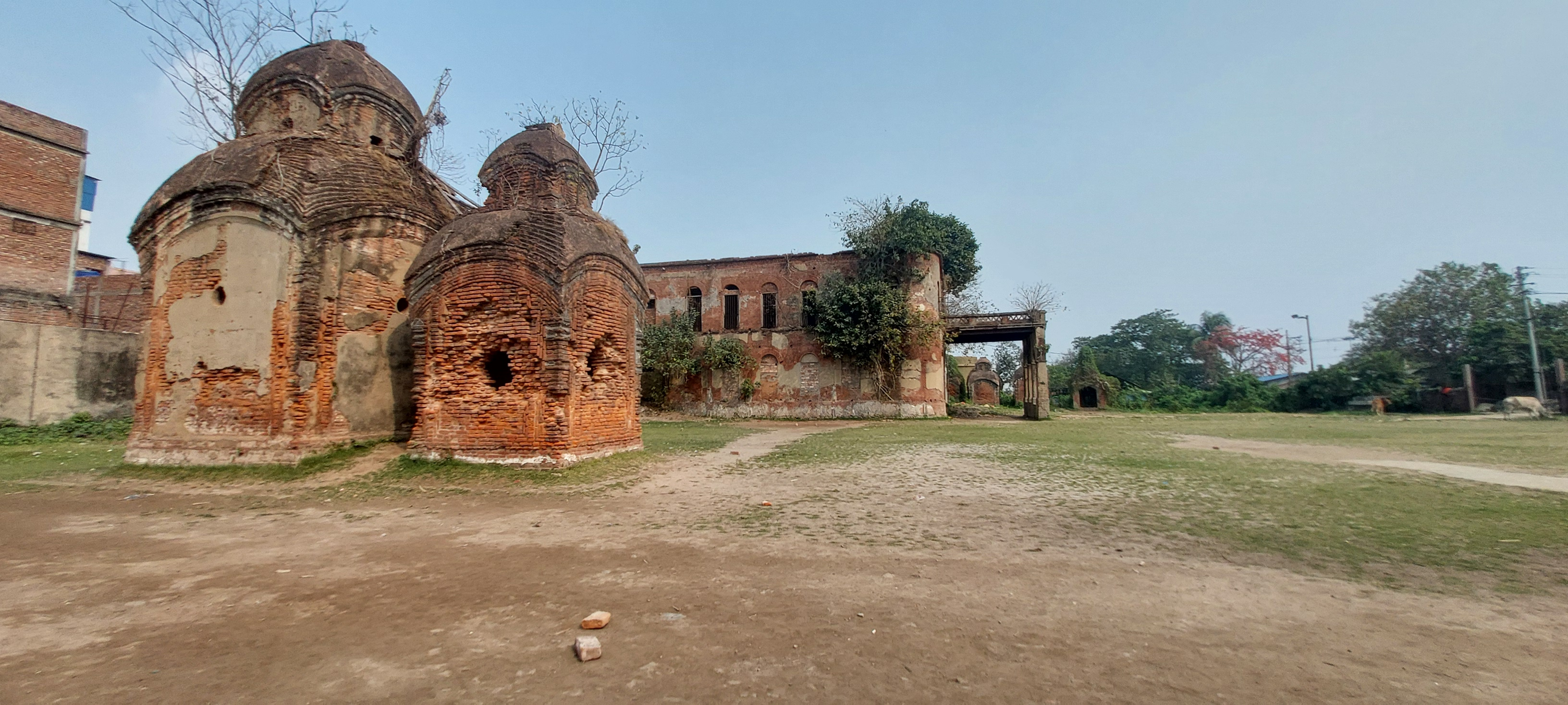
Bhot Bagan Math at Ghusuri

Bhot Bagan Moth popularly known as Mahakal Math is a Tibetan Buddhist Temple located at Ghusuri, Howrah district in the Indian state of West Bengal. It is the first Tibetan Buddhist Temple in the plains of India. The Moth is a unique monastery with rare combination of Shaiva and Tibetan Buddhist culture.

== History ==
The third Panchen Lama wanted to restore the connections between Tibet and India, he asked English representative George Bogle to make arrangements. Bogle reported the issue to the then Governor General of Bengal Warren Hastings. Hastings donated huge lands to Puran Giri (1743–1795), the representative of Panchen Lama and the Moth was founded in 1776. Puran Giri, the famous Dashnami Saint later worshipped Shaivas, Hindu Buddhist mixed religious rituals in the Moth. In 1795, Moth was attacked by armed dacoit and Puran Giri was killed to resist them. Since 1905, the Moth became abandoned and presently the Moth complex is under the supervision of the West Bengal Heritage Commission. The Moth complex includes number of brick built dilapidated temples and Vaishnava Mahanta Graveyard.
