= Ghusuri =

Locality in Howrah, West Bengal, India

- Neighbourhood
- Location in West Bengal, India Ghusuri (West Bengal) Ghusuri (India)
- Country: India
- State: West Bengal
- Division: Presidency
- District: Howrah
- City: Howrah
- Metro Station: Howrah(under construction)

Government
  - Type: Municipal Corporation
  - Body: Howrah Municipal Corporation
- Elevation: 13 m (43 ft)

Languages
  - official: Bengali, English
- Time zone: UTC5:30 (IST)
- PIN: 711107
- Telephone code: +91 33
- Vehicle registration: WB
- HMC wards: 1, 2, 3, 4
- Lok Sabha constituency: Howrah
- Vidhan Sabha constituency: Howrah Uttar

Ghusuri is a neighbourhood in Howrah of Howrah district in the Indian state of West Bengal. It is a part of the area covered by Kolkata Metropolitan Development Authority (KMDA). Bhot Bagan Moth, Indian oldest Tibetan Buddhist monastery outside the Himalayas situated at Ghusuri. Ghusuri is under the jurisdiction of Malipanchghara Police Station of Howrah City Police.

== Location ==
Ghusuri is situated on the west bank of Hooghly River. It lies on the east of Liluah, between Salkia and Belur.

== Transport ==
State Highway 6 (West Bengal)/ Grand Trunk Road passes through the west side of Ghusuri. Jogendranath Mukherjee Road runs along the eastern part of Ghusuri.

=== Bus ===
==== Private Bus ====
- 51 Pardankuni - Howrah Station
- 54 Bally Khal – Esplanade
- 56 Ruiya Purbapara - Howrah Station

==== Mini Bus ====
- 1A Satyabala – Ruby Hospital
- 10 Bally Khal – Khidirpur
- 11 Belur Math – Esplanade
- 25 Malipanchghara – Sealdah/Rajabazar

==== CSTC Bus ====
- S32A Belgharia (Rathtala) - Howrah Station

=== Train ===
Liluah railway station is the nearest railway station.
