= St Peter's Cemetery, Dalbeth =

Victorian cemetery in Glasgow, Scotland

Coordinates: 55.84020°N 4.18556°W

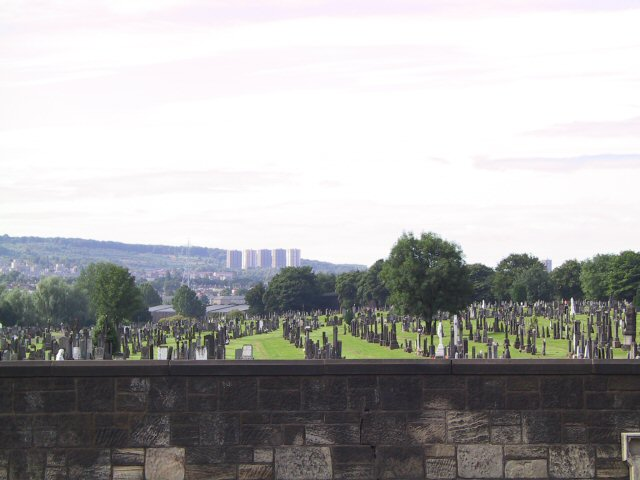
- Interactive map of St Peter's Cemetery, Dalbeth

Details
- Established: 1863; 163 years ago
- Location: Glasgow
- Country: Scotland

St Peter's is a Victorian cemetery in the Dalbeth district of Glasgow, Scotland. The burial ground lies on the northern banks of the River Clyde, and has traditionally served the local Catholic population of nearby suburbs, such as Tollcross, Shettleston, and Parkhead.

== Background ==
The land now occupied by St Peter's formerly constituted a portion of the territory that was governed by the Bishops of Glasgow, whose estates were collectively referred to as the Barony of Glasgow. Dalbeth itself was endowed to the Barony by charter in 1242, when Alexander II granted rights of Free Forest to William, Bishop of Glasgow of the lands around Glasgow, including "Conclud, Schedinistun, Ballayn, Badermonoc, Possele and Kenmore, Garvach, Neutun, Leys, Ramnishoren, and those of the burgh." In 1450, a new charter was issued by James II that "erected the city, the barony of Glasgow, and the lands known as Bishops' Forest into a regality." Elevation of the lands to the status of regality essentially conferred upon the Bishops of Glasgow the privilege of operating "a state within a state." The power of the see was bolstered in 1492, when Pope Innocent VIII elevated Glasgow from Bishopric to Archbishopric, making Robert Blackadder the first Archbishop of Glasgow.

The coming of the Scottish Reformation had significant implications for Dalbeth, and other lands that had been under the dominion of the Catholic Church. The Papal Jurisdiction Act of 1560 stripped the Archbishopric of its authority, and the Annexation Act of 1587 resulted in lands that had been under Archbishopric control being forfeited to the Crown and gentry. Consequently, the lands of Dalbeth were divided between the Luke (or Louk), Gray, and Wardrop (or Woddrop) families, with the estate eventually falling primarily under the possession of the Wardrops by the end of the 16th century. The Wardrops ultimately passed the estate to Thomas Hopkirk in around 1754, and Hopkirk's descendants continued in ownership of the house, and surrounding lands, until the death of his grandson in 1841.

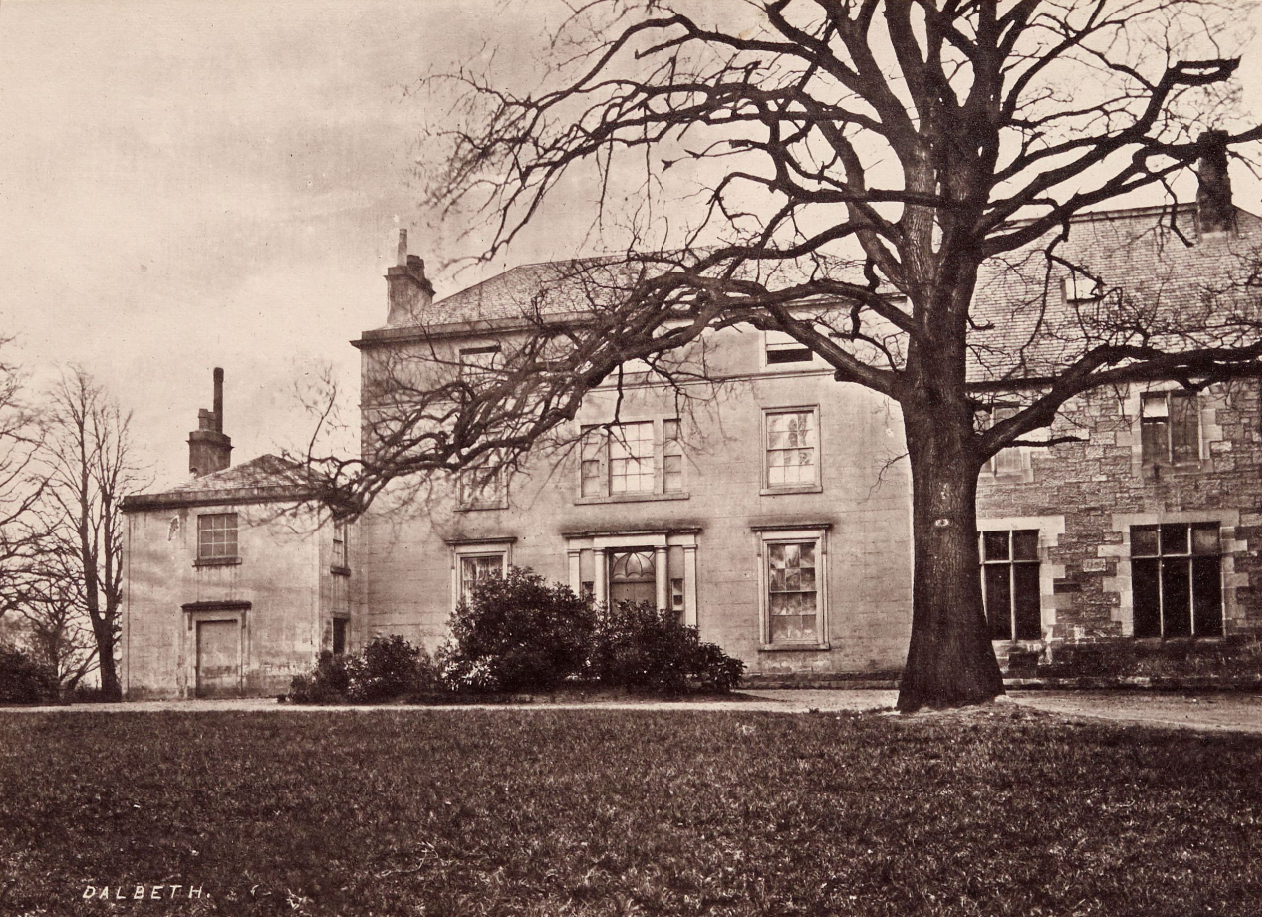
Thomas Annan photograph of Dalbeth House (taken 1870)

The Catholic Emancipation Act of 1829 lifted most of the remaining restrictions on the Catholic Church in Scotland, and in 1846, on the encouragement of Fr. Peter Forbes, the Dalbeth estate was purchased by the Church "for the purpose of establishing a Catholic college." This restored the Dalbeth estate to the Catholic Church for the first time since 1587, and a convent under the auspices of the Congregation of Our Lady of Charity of the Good Shepherd was consequently founded in March 1851. Despite original intentions to institute a college at the site, the erstwhile mansion house was ultimately repurposed as the Dalbeth Refuge for Penitent Women; a Magdalene instiution, equipped to house up to 30 'penitents'. It has been noted that the refuge, "operated in a similar fashion and closely resembled a penitentiary", but admission was, in fact, on a voluntary basis.

By 1856, a reformatory school for Catholic girls was also founded at the location, by a Mrs. Lockwood, who would go on to establish St. Joseph's Reformatory for Roman Catholic Girls, Limerick in 1859. An inspection of the Dalbeth reformatory in 1857 found that "the school had made very fair progress"; the number of girls had increased considerably, Mrs. Newson had succeeded Mrs. Lockwood as lady superior, and "the establishment [was] still but recent, but so far [had] worked successfully."

In 1868, the premises were enlarged to accommodate 150 inmates. In contrast with the occupants of the refuge, the children of the reformatory were broadly accommodated under detention. Indeed, in 1885, of the 52 girls enrolled, only one was present "on voluntary list." By this time, a laundry had been constructed on the site, and the total population of women and girls exceeded 200. By 1892, however, the number of girls under detention had fallen to 41, and it was decided to transfer them to other reformatories (principally Arno's Court in Bristol), and use the premises at Dalbeth as an industrial school, instead. In 1933, the institution was rebranded the Dalbeth Approved School for Roman Catholic Girls (or simply Dalbeth Girls School). During the First World War, the convent was used to accommodate Belgian refugees.

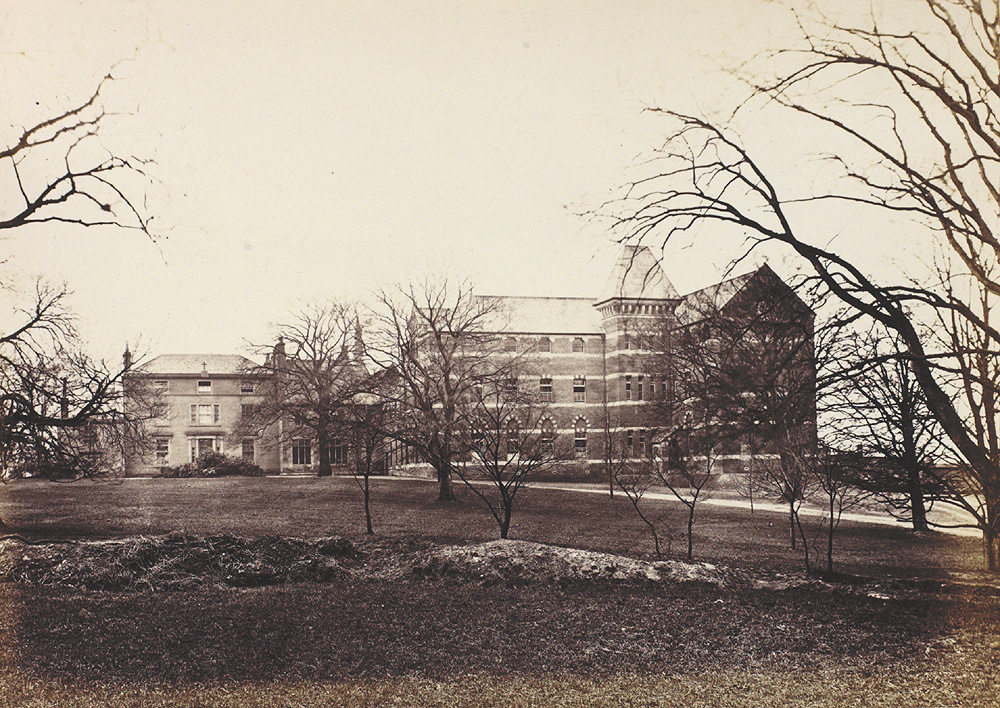
Former Dalbeth House and adjoining Convent of the Good Shepherd

The Congregation of Our Lady of Charity of the Good Shepherd vacated Dalbeth for Renfrewshire in 1949, and the school was relocated to Bishopton in 1953, where it subsequently came under the scrutiny of the Scottish Child Abuse Inquiry. In 1975, St Peter's church, which had been built for the convent in 1902, was closed, along with the affiliated primary school. In 1996, most buildings on the site, including the erstwhile church and primary school (which had occupied the former reformatory buildings), were demolished and the ground they occupied opened up for additional burial plots. The rectory remains, and part of Dalbeth House may be preserved within the structure of the cemetery's administration building.

== History ==
Prior to the foundation of St Peter's Cemetery, in 1863, an earlier burial ground existed on the eastern portion of the lands belonging to the Congregation of Our Lady of Charity of the Good Shepherd. While often grouped with St Peter's, this area is properly Old Dalbeth Cemetery, and had been in the convent's use from their arrival in 1851, and possibly by the Hopkirk family from the early 19th century.

To accommodate the increased operations of the Sisters of the Good Shepherd, as well as the rapid growth of the local Irish Catholic population, the western portion of the convent's lands were laid out for use as a much expanded burial ground in 1863. By 1888, the practice of pit burial at St Peter's had elicited the concern of the Barony Parochial Board's medical authorities. Following an inspection of the cemetery, one Dr. Christie was critical of the process:

[...] The burial outs at present in use are 12 feet deep, 7½ feet long, and 6 feet wide. The pit is dug into from 4 to 6 feet of the original stiff clay soil, the upper portion being made-up soil. A layer of coffins is placed on the bottom, and sprinkled over with a little earth, then another layer of coffins, and so on, until the pit is filled to about 3 feet from the surface, when it is covered over with stiff clay. Each pit, when full, will contain about 36 adult bodies, and about the same number of children, making about 70 in all. The pit system has been in vogue since 1863, when the cemetery was opened, but at first and for several years the pits were much smaller than those now in use [...] Seventy coffins disposed of within the space mentioned, and covered with three feet of clay, is a nuisance within the meaning of the [Public Health (Scotland) Act, 1867], and as such a nuisance exists at Dalbeth.

In response to the report, the Archbishop of Glasgow responded that:

[...] while willing and anxious to meet every proper and reasonable requirement, [he] cannot see that there is any evidence that the methods hitherto adopted have created, or are likely to create, a nuisance. He refers to the exceptionally good health enjoyed by the inmates and attendants of the reformatories on each side of the cemetery, the low death-rate, and the favourable reports of Her Majesty's inspectors as supporting this view, and expresses the opinion that the offensive odours complained of arise from the Tollcross Burn. He, therefore, thinks it a hardship that Dalbeth Cemetery should have been singled out for animadversion, and the managers of it alone called on to alter their method of interment.

In addition to the many memorials commemorating prominent members of Glasgow's Irish community, with whom St Peter's is principally associated, the cemetery is also home to many of the city's Italian and Polish deceased. Notably, an enclave of the grounds is dedicated to Polish veterans of the Second World War, and their families. This section includes the Polish Naval Association Memorial; erected in 1970, and restored in 2026, it "consists of three separate granite stones, each bearing the names of deceased members of the Polish Naval Association in Glasgow." A memorial to Glasgow's Belgian refugees, some of whom had been housed at Dalbeth's convent during the First World War, had been planned for installation at the cemetery, but did not reach completion.

== Notable memorials ==
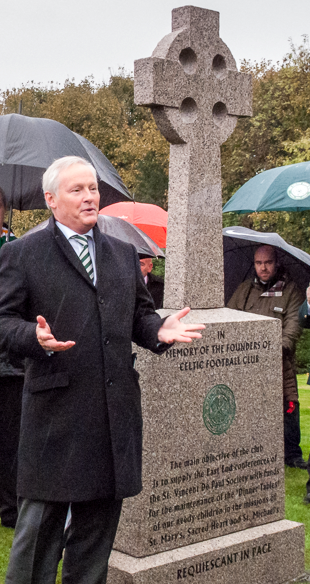
Ian Bankier speaking at the Celtic Founding Fathers Memorial, 2 November 2013

Name	Description	Year
Blantyre Mining Disaster Memorial	Memorial to the Catholic miners killed in the Blantyre Pit Explosion of 22 October 1877, many of whom are buried at Dalbeth.	1878
Polish Naval Association Memorial	Memorial commissioned by Boleslaw Lassa, President of the Polish Naval Association.	1970
Memorial to Founding Fathers of Celtic Football Club	Cross dedicated to the founders of Celtic F.C., commissioned by the Celtic Graves Society and blessed by the Archbishop of Glasgow.	2013

== Other burials of note ==
- Canon Michael Condon, notable Roman Catholic priest and historian
- Alice Coogan (née Byrne), Cumann na mBan revolutionary and sister of Catherine Rooney (née Byrne)
- Patrick Dollan, Lord Provost of Glasgow
- John Gray, Roman Catholic bishop
- George Green, cinema pioneer
- John Maguire, Archbishop of Glasgow
- James McGhee, Provincial Secretary of the Ancient Order of Hibernians
- Hugh McInnes, Victoria Cross recipient
- James Ward, Roman Catholic bishop
- John Wheatley, socialist politician
- Founders of Celtic F.C., including: John Conway, John Glass, John O'Hara, John McKillop, William McKillop, David Meikleham, Joseph Shaughnessy
- Celtic F.C. footballers, including: Barney Battles, John Bonnar, John James Campbell, Dan Doyle, Michael Dunbar, Davie Hamilton, John McAlindon, Jimmy McGrory, Michael McKeown, Sandy McMahon, Jimmy McMenemy, Jerry Reynolds

== War graves ==
St Peter's cemetery holds graves of 287 Commonwealth service personnel, including 118 from World War I and 155 from World War II, that are registered and maintained by the Commonwealth War Graves Commission.

== See also ==
- Category:Burials at St Peter's Cemetery, Dalbeth
- Glasnevin Cemetery
- Milltown Cemetery
