= James McGhee (Hibernian) =

Irish nationalist

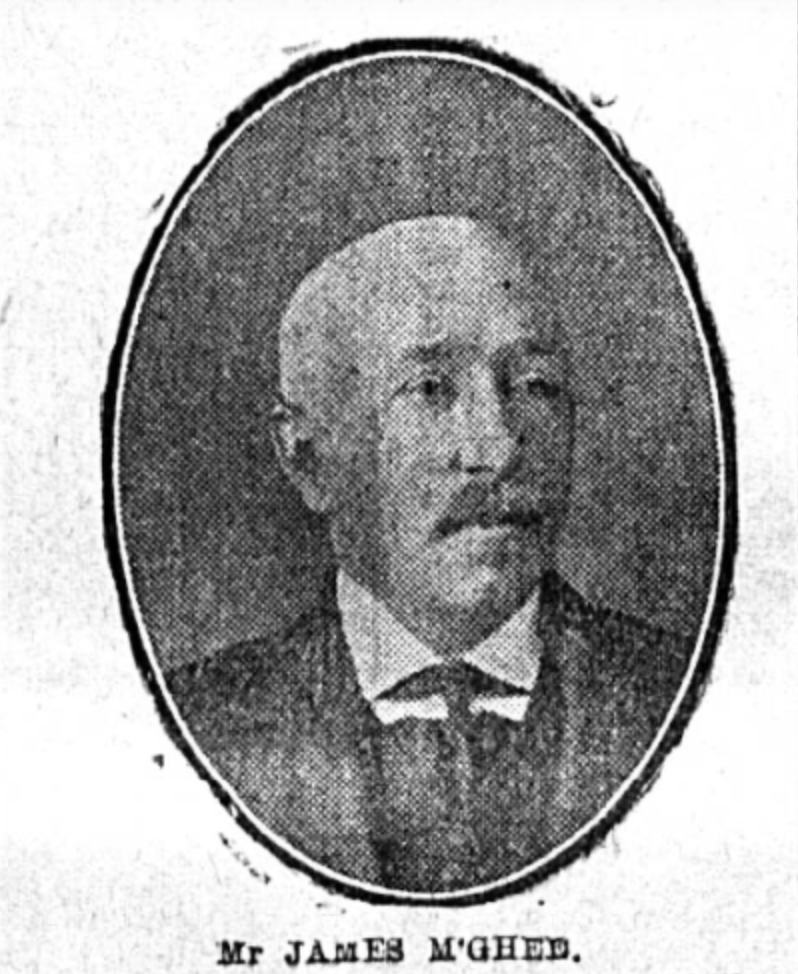
- McGhee in 1917

Provincial Secretary of the Ancient Order of Hibernians

Personal details
- Born: 28 January 1861 Tollcross, Lanarkshire, Scotland
- Died: 13 September 1921 (aged 60) Dennistoun, Lanarkshire, Scotland
- Resting place: St Peter's Cemetery, Dalbeth, Glasgow, Scotland
- Occupation: Provincial secretary of the A.O.H.

James McGhee (1861–1921) was a prominent Glaswegian Irish nationalist, and Provincial Secretary of the Ancient Order of Hibernians (A.O.H.) for Scotland. A "popular figure in Irish and Catholic circles in the Eastern suburbs of Glasgow", McGhee was also an office-holding member of the Home Rule Association, the Land League, the United Irish League and the Irish National Foresters.

== Early life and career ==
James McGhee was born in Tollcross in 1861 to Irish immigrant parents; James McGhee, a coal pit labourer "hailing from Fermanagh", and Jane Lafferty, "from Donegal."

A 1903 edition of the Glasgow Observer reported that McGhee "served his apprenticeship with the old Home Rule Association, which existed in Shettleston, in the days of his youth."

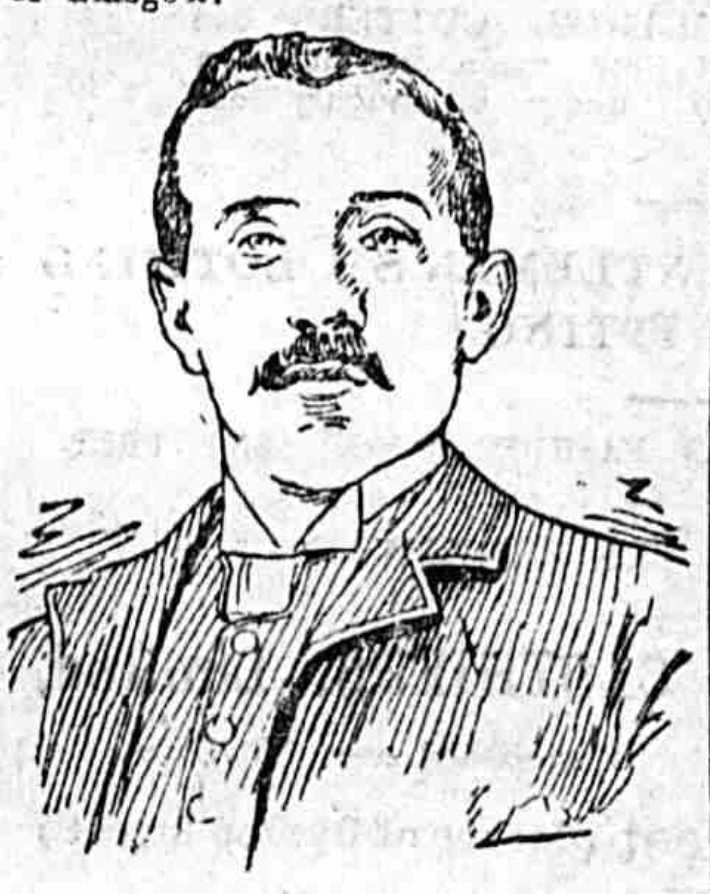
Sketch of James McGhee, "a Popular Nationalist."

As a young man, James McGhee initially found work in local coal pits, and later pursued a career as a spirit salesman. It was, however, through his involvement in the Irish Catholic fraternities of Glasgow that McGhee achieved his status as a public figure.

Following the supersession of the Home Rule Association by the Irish National Land League, McGhee "took an active part in the formation of the (Shettleston-based) 'Exile' Branch" of the League. Due to lack of sufficient local support, the Branch relocated its meeting-place to nearby Tollcross.

The Glasgow Observer noted that, as of 1903, the 'Exile' Branch had "existed through all the vicissitudes of the Irish movement", by which point it had become affiliated with the United Irish League (U.I.L.). McGhee had acted as president of the 'Exile' Branch for seven years, and had been secretary for three. The article further stated that, at the time of writing, McGhee was incumbent president of the 'Archbishop Walsh' Branch of the U.I.L.; the "resuscitation of which [was] largely due to his efforts, and for which he [was] a tireless member."

In addition, McGhee was an active member of the Irish National Foresters (I.N.F.). He was among the first members of Parkhead's 'Father Beyaert' Branch, and served as Chief Ranger in 'St Joseph's' Branch, Tollcross. For the latter, McGhee was instrumental in the formation of a Ladies' and Junior I.N.F. Branch for the district.

From around 1896, McGhee volunteered as a collector for St Michael's Parish, Parkhead. Regarding his efforts, it was reported that for him "to be a member of any society was to be an active member" and that he was "a valuable asset to the Irish community of [Glasgow's] eastern district."

== Ancient Order of Hibernians ==
James McGhee's family had a history of involvement with the A.O.H. His uncle, John McGhee, who was among the first Catholic parishioners of Shettleston, was a "lifelong member of the Order."

McGhee first held office in the society in 1904, when he was appointed secretary of the Lanark County Board. Soon after, McGhee assumed duties as secretary to the 'Rory Oge O'More Funeral District'.

By 1909, McGhee had begun to argue the case for a Ladies' Auxiliary Branch of the A.O.H. in Scotland; "would to God we had 80,000 of our sister Hibs here, for in a generation we would have youthful minds [taught] the true precepts of the Order, and likewise cherishing them in the True Faith, and by this means we would become a real power for faith, purity and nationality." The women's division, devised in the United States a year previous, went on to take off in Scotland by 1914. McGhee's advocation for the inclusion of women in the society proved vital. By 1917, seven out of nine of his male staff were called up for military service, and female labour was relied upon "with excellent results."

Despite its status as a devoutly Catholic fraternity, the A.O.H. suffered a schism with the Church between 1882 and 1910, during which years it was officially banned by the Catholic Church in Scotland. After the lifting of the ban, James McGhee "urged the officers and members to admit nothing but practical Catholics to their ranks" in effort to maintain favour with the local clergy.

In his capacity as Provincial Secretary for the A.O.H., McGhee was responsible for the expansion of the organisation's Scottish support-base, which was "not very large" at the time of his joining in 1904. In 1917, McGhee was honoured for his efforts; by "dint of [his] perseverance there were 19,404 members on the roll and 194 divisions."

=== Irish Flag Day ===
During the years of the First World War, James McGhee acted as organiser of Glasgow's Irish Flag Day celebrations, which took place annually on Saint Patrick's Day weekend. In 1915, the event had the object of raising funds for Belgians affected by war. By 1918, its scope had broadened to include:

1. The Limbless Soldiers of all Classes and Creeds at Erskine House.
2. The Soldiers' and Sailors' Help Fund under the patronage of the Lord Provost of Glasgow.
3. The Widows, Orphans and Dependents of members of the A.O.H. who have lost their lives in this Great War.

Through the sale of 2.75 million Irish flags and the participation of "over 150 local and parish convenors [...] in Glasgow and the West of Scotland, Dundee, Edinburgh and the East," the 1915 Irish Flag Day raised £5,560 for its cause. In addition to raising funds for "suffering Belgium", the event had "raised hopes that such a display had done a great deal to soften or dispose of racial prejudices and perpetuate neighbourly feeling between the Irish and Scotch in Scotland.”

By contrast, the 1918 Flag Day, although reported a "thorough success" by the Glasgow Observer, was met with sectarian opposition:

Mr McGhee states that the total receipts to date are about £2000. Considering the ill-mannered and ungenerous outbreak of opposition and misrepresentation and the splenetic prejudice – the outcome of ignorance – against the green flag, the £2000 total is excellent. Let us hope that, despite boycott and bigotry, the Irish Flag will continue to wave.

In explicit rebuttal to sectarian objections against 1918's Irish Flag Day, McGhee wrote:

Sir,-In answer to your correspondent of the 5th inst. regarding the Irish Flag Day, if he would look at the advertisement columns in your paper he would know the objects of the Irish Flag Day. Every sane citizen of Glasgow, Scottish or Irish, is conversant with the objects of the Irish Flag Day. He mentions the trouble the Sinn Feiners are giving to the Scottish and English soldiers in Ireland. The organisers of the Irish Flag Day have no connection with the Sinn Feiners, and if he knew anything at all about Irish history he would have known this. "Scotland for Ever" also states that on the last Irish Flag Day a very disloyal flag was sold in the streets for some charity. Let me inform him that the same green flag adorns the walls of the British House of Commons, and if it was disloyal it would not be there.

He seems to be ignorant of the history of the A.O.H., who are organising the flag day. Every school child knows the history of the A.O.H., not only in Scotland, but all over the United Kingdom. Last year's green flag was not sold for charity. I would not, as the organiser of the Irish Flag Day, term it a charity. It was for the Irish interned prisoners in Germany. Your correspondent seems to be ignorant of this fact also. Let me inform him that 6000 of the A.O.H. members in Scotland have joined the colours and are doing their bit. I do not know of any other benefit society that can show the same figures out of a membership of 20,000.-I am, etc., JAMES M'GHEE, Hon. Secy.

== Death and burial ==
James McGhee was "daily and nightly attending and speaking at meetings of the A.O.H., opening branches" or otherwise working until August 1921, when he suffered a "severe attack of illness." While it was widely believed that he was on track to recovery, McGhee died on the morning of 13 September 1921, the result of cerebral haemorrhage and cardiac failure. He left a widow, Martha (née Mochan), and three children by his first wife, Annie (née Tracey).

Of McGhee's death, the Weekly Freeman reported:

His loss to the order in Scotland is incalculable. To his worth and work in large measure is due the splendid position presently occupied by the A.O.H. in this country. In his death Ireland has lost a worthy and faithful son. In small space it would be impossible to do justice to his work for Ireland and for the society to which he devoted all his energy, all his ability, and all his strength.

James McGhee's funeral took place at St Anne's Church on 17 September 1921, and was followed by interment at Dalbeth Cemetery. McGhee's remains were borne to the grave by John Dillon Nugent, M.P. (General Secretary, A.O.H.), J. Nugent, John Currie (District President, A.O.H.), Daniel McClory (District Vice President, A.O.H.).

At the solemn Requiem Mass for the repose of his soul, which was celebrated in St. Anne's Church on Saturday morning, there were present officials and members of almost every branch of the Order in Scotland, while Mr. J. D. Nugent, M.O., Mr. James Stafford, and other leading officials travelled from Ireland to be present at the Mass and the funeral. His edifying death, comforted by all the consolations of the Holy Church, was a fitting prelude to the enormously large funeral in Dalbeth Cemetery. The fervent prayers at the graveside of that huge concourse of sorrowing friends was a fitting tribute to the dead patriot.
