= Glasgow Botanic Gardens =

Botanica garden in Glasgow, Scotland

Coordinates: 55.87930°N 4.29066°W

- Location: Glasgow, Scotland
- Key people: Thomas Hopkirk (Founder); William Hooker (Developer); John Kibble (Architect of historic glasshouse)
- Website: The Friends of Glasgow Botanic Gardens

Inventory of Gardens and Designed Landscapes in Scotland
- Official name: Glasgow Botanic Gardens
- Designated: 1 July 1987
- Reference no.: GDL00190

Glasgow Botanic Gardens is a botanical garden located in the West End of Glasgow, Scotland. It features several glasshouses, the most notable of which is the Kibble Palace.

The Gardens has a wide variety of temperate and tropical flora, a herb garden, a chronological bed with plants arranged according to their introduction to Scotland, the UK's national collection of tree ferns, and a world rose garden officially opened in 2003 by Princess Tomohito of Mikasa.

The River Kelvin runs along the north side of the Gardens and continues through Kelvingrove Park, the Kelvin walkway providing an uninterrupted walking route between the two green spaces.

The Botanic Gardens was awarded a Green Flag Award in 2011.

== History ==
In 1817 about eight acres (three hectares) of land were laid out at Sandyford, near Sauchiehall Street, Glasgow, and run by the Royal Botanic Institution of Glasgow (founded by Thomas Hopkirk of Dalbeth and Prof James Jeffray Professor of Botany at Glasgow University), and were intended to supply the University of Glasgow. William Hooker was regius professor of botany at Glasgow University, and contributed to the development of the Botanic Gardens before his appointment to the directorship of Kew Gardens in London. The Gardens moved to its current location in 1842. The gardens were originally used for concerts and other events, and in 1891 the gardens were incorporated into the Parks and Gardens of the Glasgow Corporation.

The site was once served by a railway line, and Botanic Gardens Railway Station remains today in a derelict state as a remarkable example of a disused station. It is hidden behind some trees and a metal fence blocks access to the platforms. Kirklee railway station also lies just inside the gardens.

== Kibble Palace ==
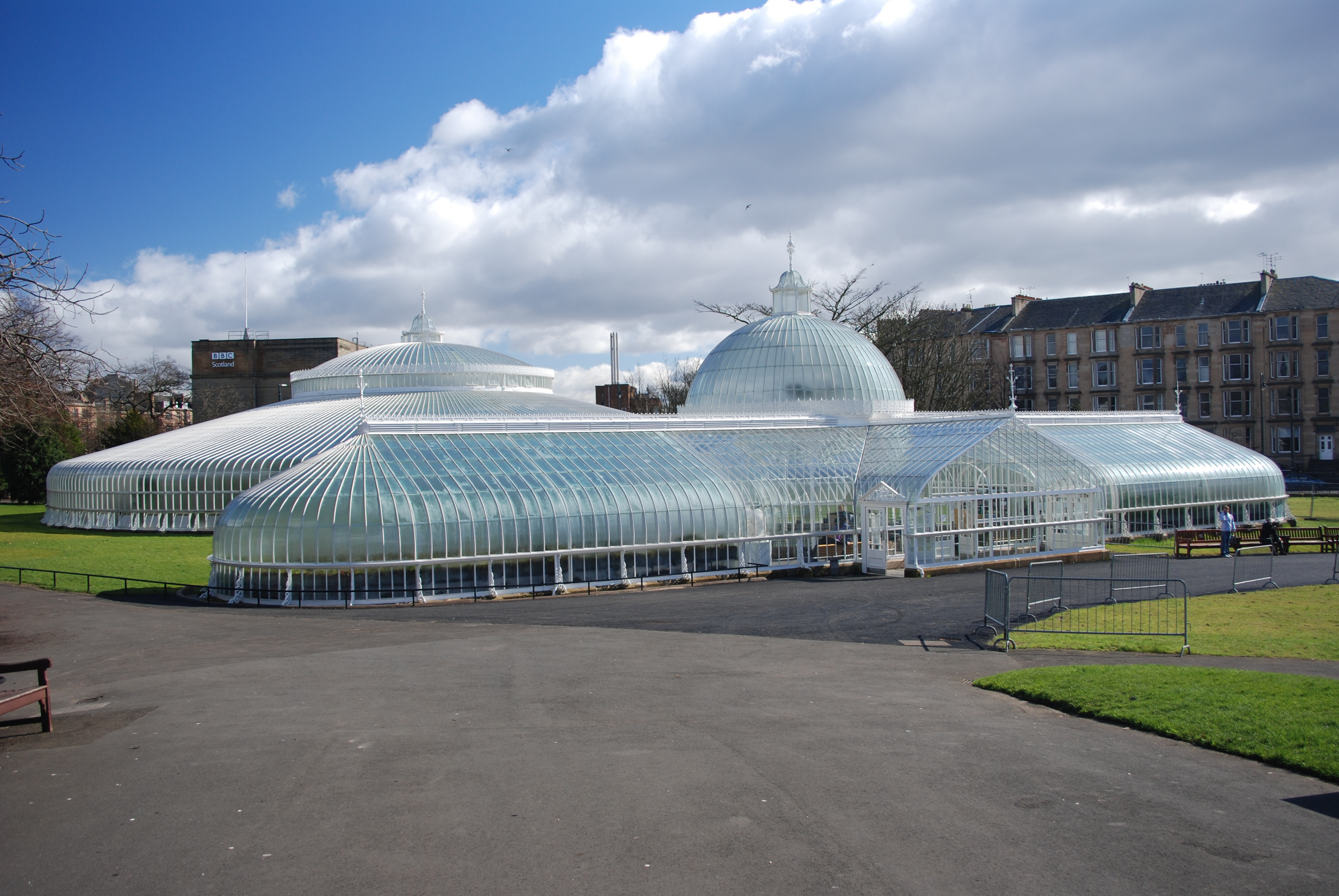
The Kibble Palace exterior.

The Kibble Palace is a 19th-century wrought iron and cast-iron-framed glasshouse, covering 2137 m^{2}. Originally designed for John Kibble by architects James Boucher and James Cousland for his home at Coulport on Loch Long in the 1860s, the components were cast by Walter Macfarlane at his Saracen Foundry in Possilpark. Eventually brought up the River Clyde by barge to the Botanic Gardens, it was fully erected at its current location in 1873 by Boyd of Paisley.

The building structure is of curved wrought iron and glass supported by cast-iron beams resting on ornate columns, surmounted on masonry foundations. It was initially used as an exhibition and concert venue, before being used for growing plants from the 1880s. Benjamin Disraeli and William Ewart Gladstone were both installed as rectors of the University of Glasgow in the palace, in 1873 and 1879 respectively – its last use as a public events venue, before becoming wholly used for the cultivation of temperate plants. The main plant group is the collection of New Zealand and Australian tree ferns, some of which have lived here for 120 years and which now form the national tree fern collection.

In the 1920s a statue was added in the palace to "King Robert of Sicily", a figure from the works of the American poet Henry Wadsworth Longfellow. This is by the Scottish sculptor George Henry Paulin.

In 2004 a £7 million restoration programme was initiated to repair severe corrosion of the ironwork. £3.4M of the cost came from the National Lottery Heritage Fund and other grants support including from Glasgow City Council and Historic Environment Scotland. The restoration involved the careful dismantling of the palace, and the removal of the parts to Shepley Engineers in Shafton, South Yorkshire for specialised repair and conservation. Their workshop had already dealt with glasshouses from Dublin and Liverpool and removal permitted the reconstruction of the strengthened plinth. To enable this the plant collection was removed completely for the first time ever, and the ironwork was re-assembled over a re-arranged internal floor layout, giving the palace a prolonged life. It re-opened to the public in November 2006.

The building contains a large collection of orchids, carnivorous plants and tree ferns.

=== Sculptures in Kibble Palace ===
- King Robert of Sicily (a hero created by Longfellow) by George Henry Paulin (1927)
- Cain by Edwin Roscoe Mellins (1899)
- Eve by Scipione Tadolini (c. 1870)
- Ruth by Giovanni Ciniselli (1880)
- The Sisters of Bethany by John Warrington Wood (about 1871)
- The Elf by William Goscombe John (1899)
- Stepping Stones by William Hamo Thornycroft (1878)
- The Nubian Slave by Antonio Rossetti (c. 1880)
sculptures in the Glasgow Botanic Gardens

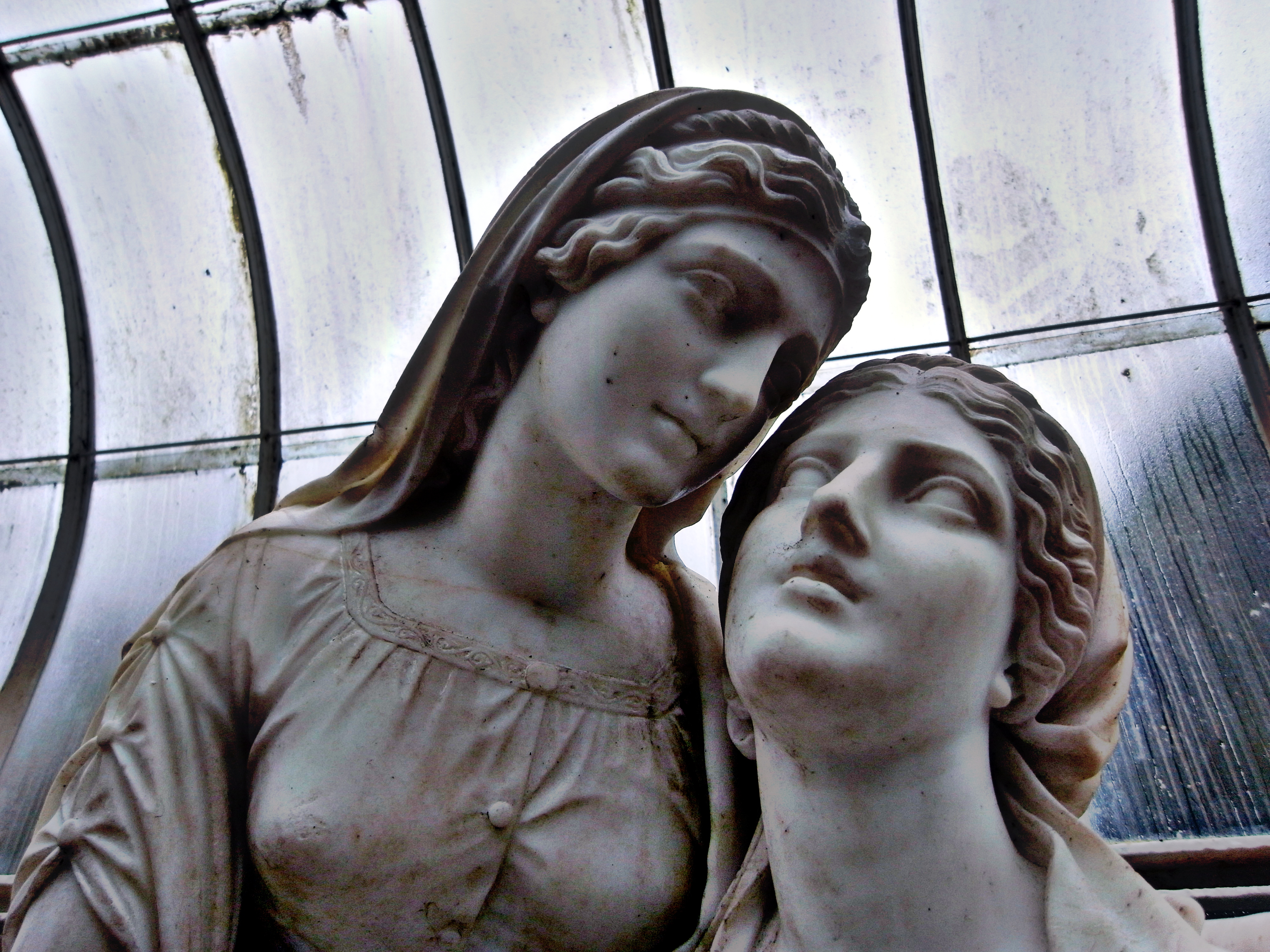
The Sisters of Bethany

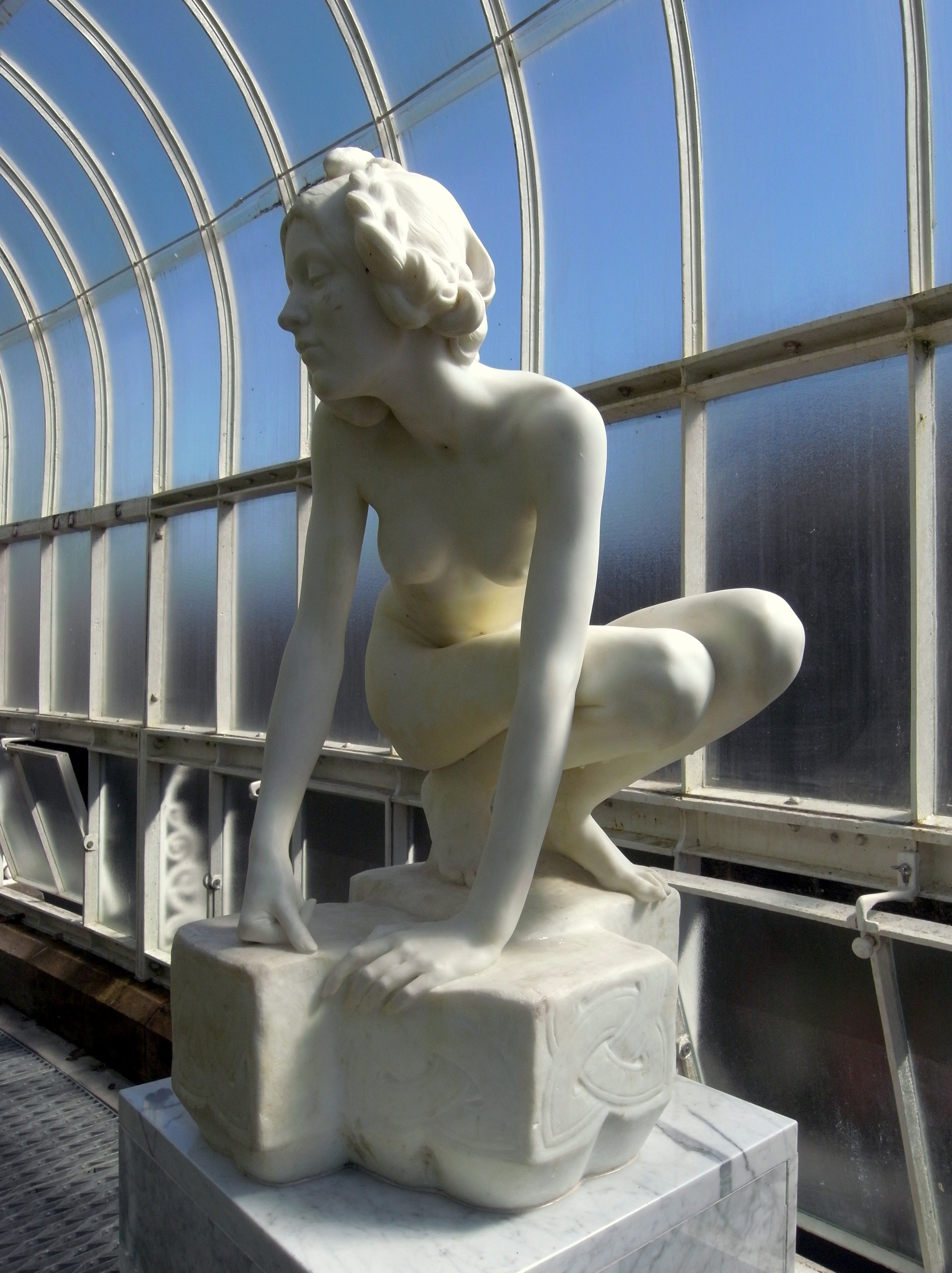
The Elf

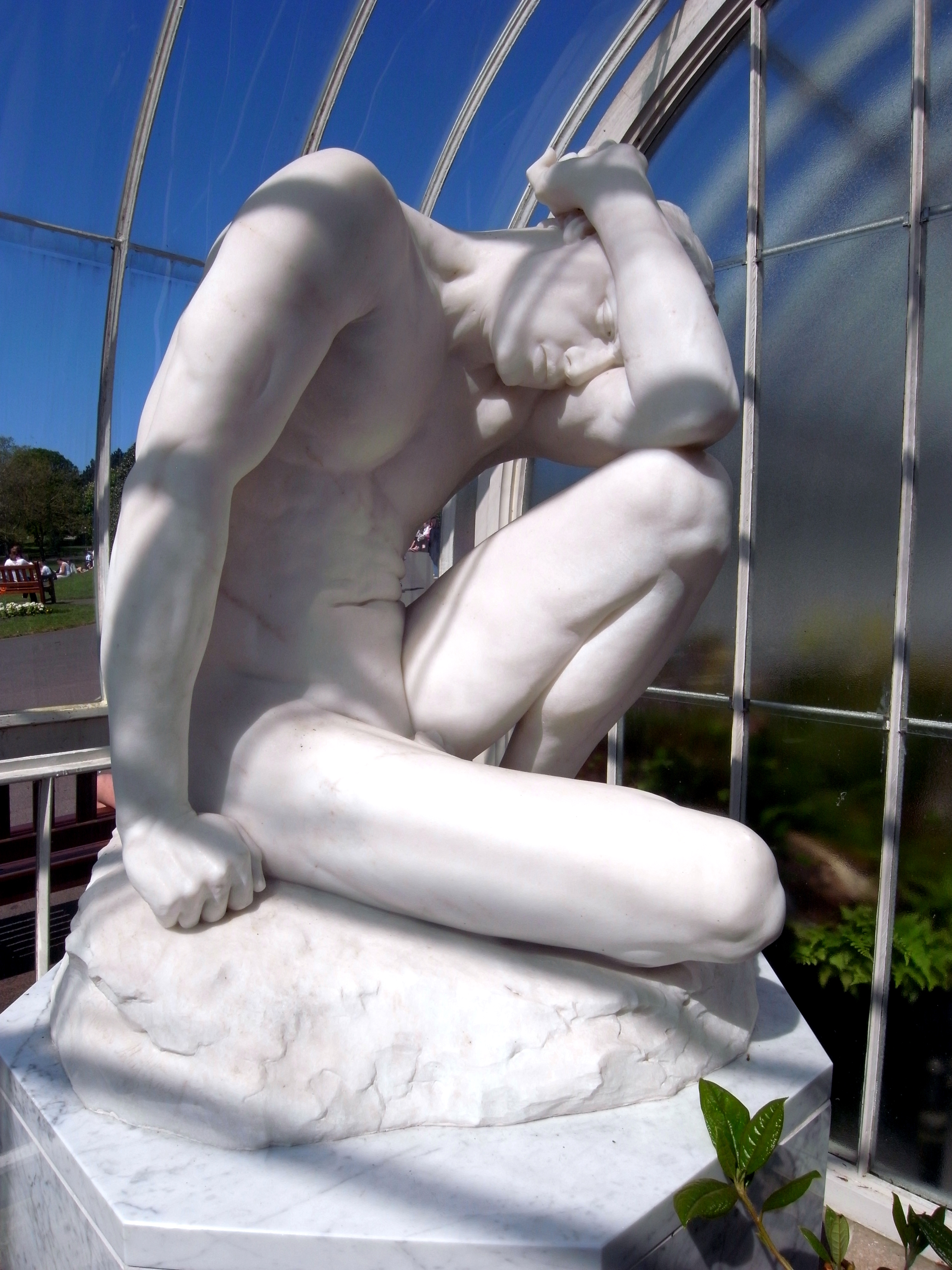
Cain

== Library ==
The Gardens has a small but long-established research library. It contains over 2,600 items in its main books collection, over 150 in its special collections, a range of botanical periodicals, and a run of Curtis's Botanical Magazine (1787–present).

The library is not a public library but a reference collection for those working directly with the Gardens, and for botanical or horticultural students and researchers.

== Gallery ==
Glasgow Botanic Gardens

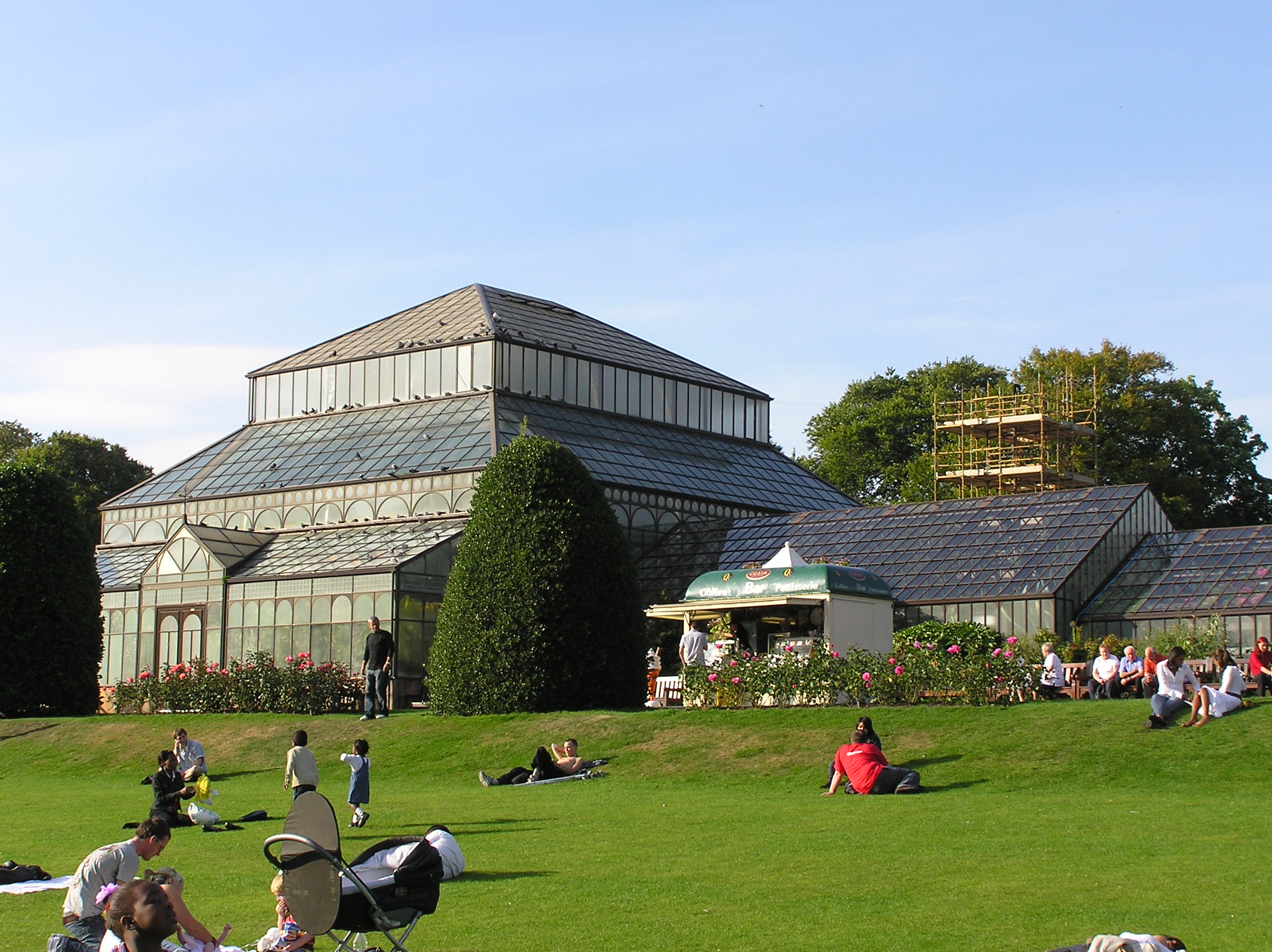
The main hothouses in 2005

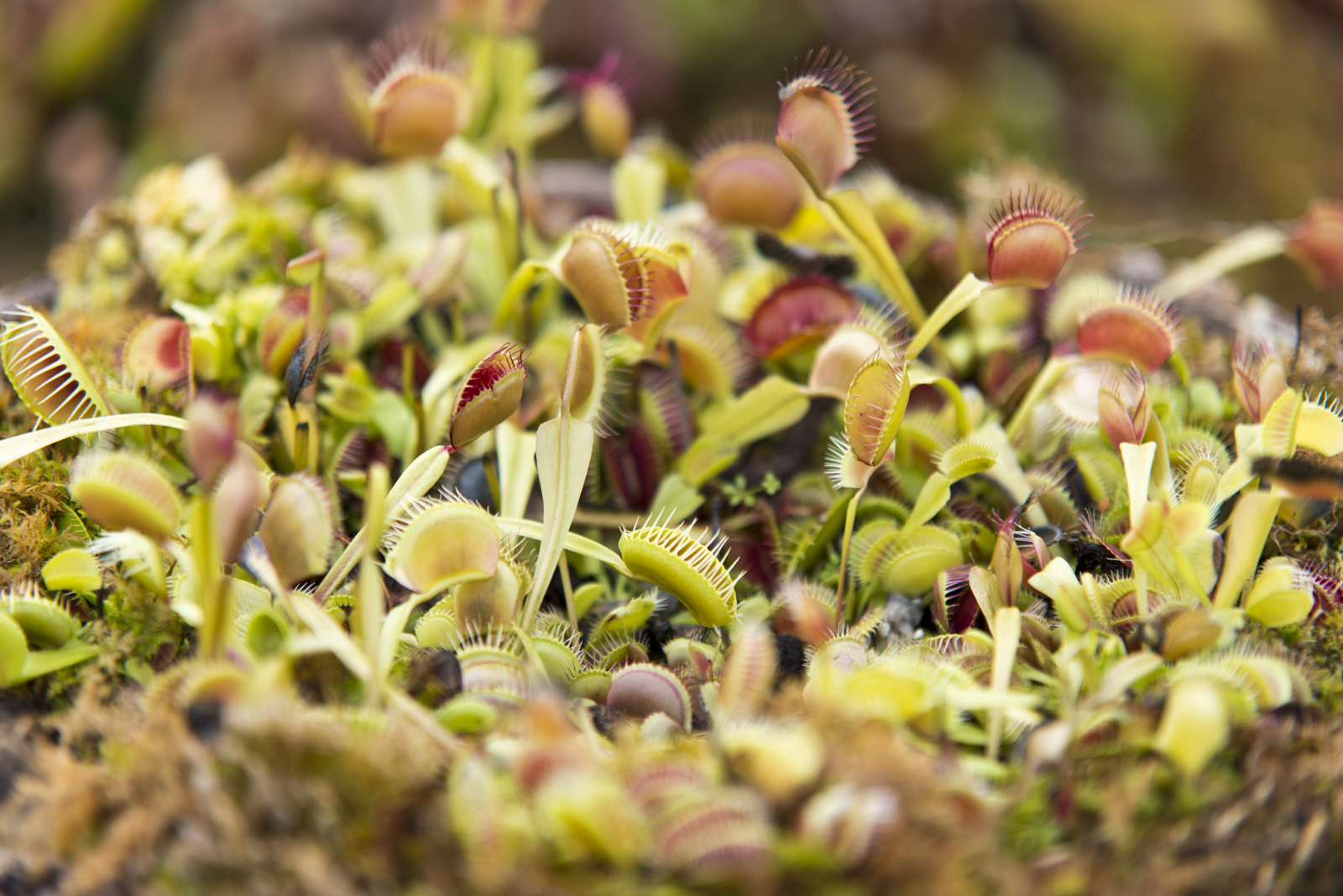
Venus flytraps in the carnivorous plants gallery

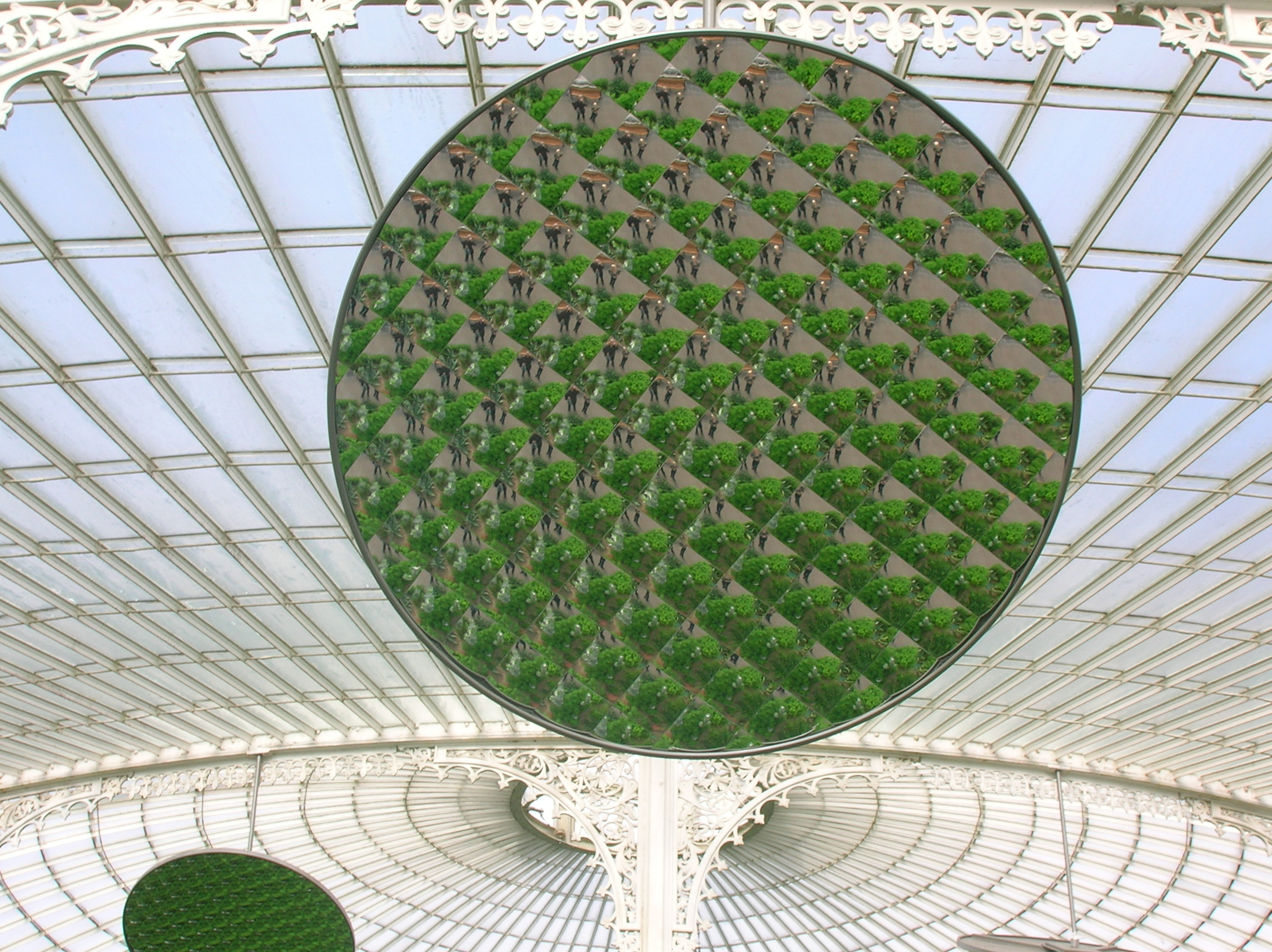
A reflective multi-facet mirror in the restored Kibble Palace

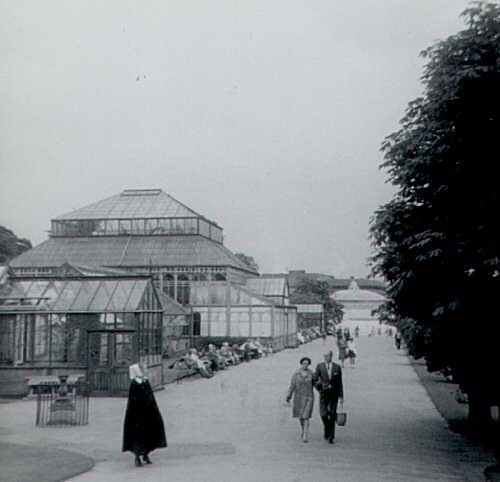
The Gardens in August 1966

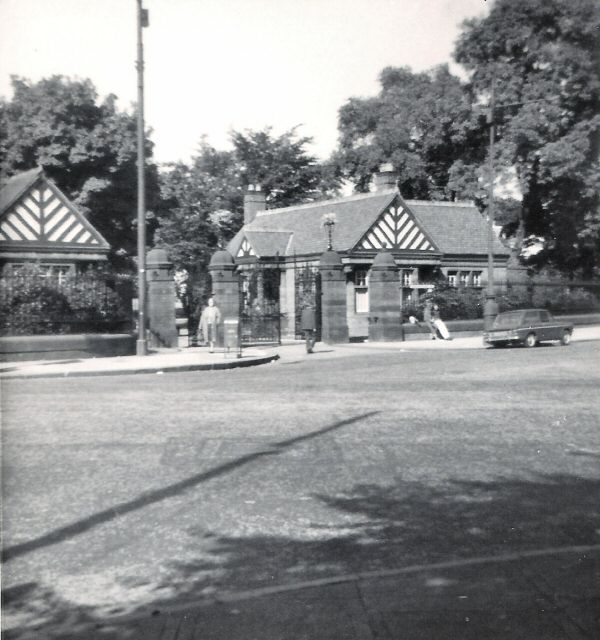
Entrance to the gardens, 1966

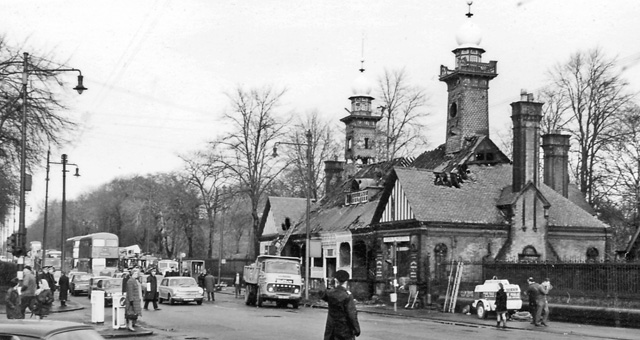
Botanic Gardens railway station, 1970

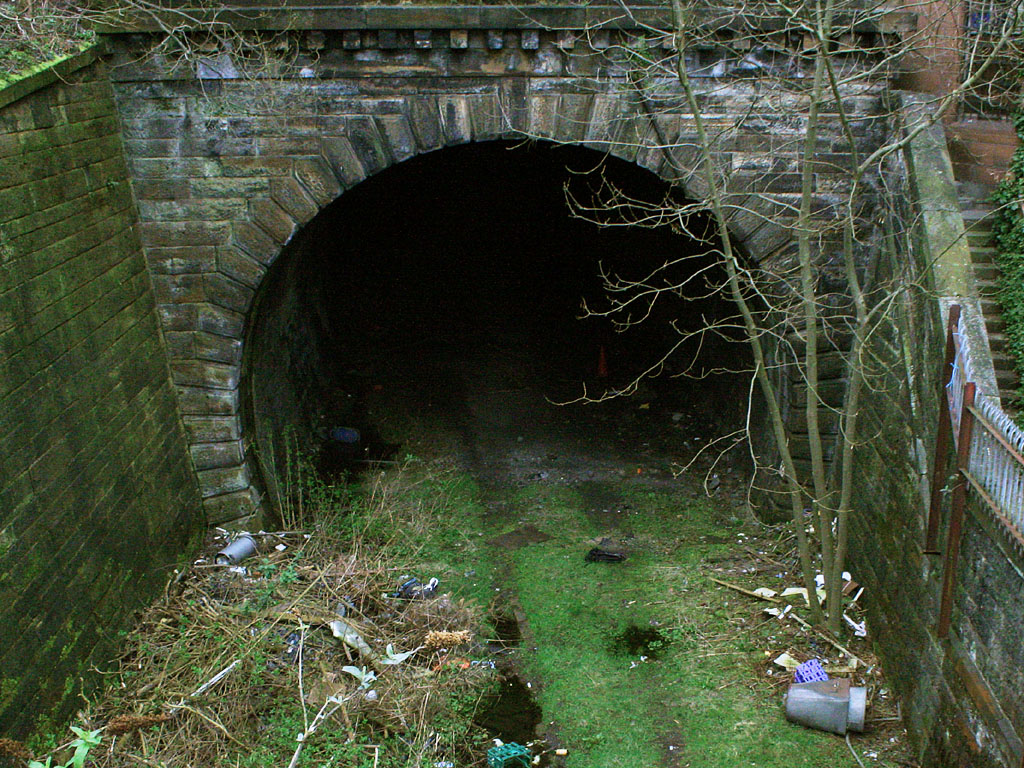
The disused railway station tunnel

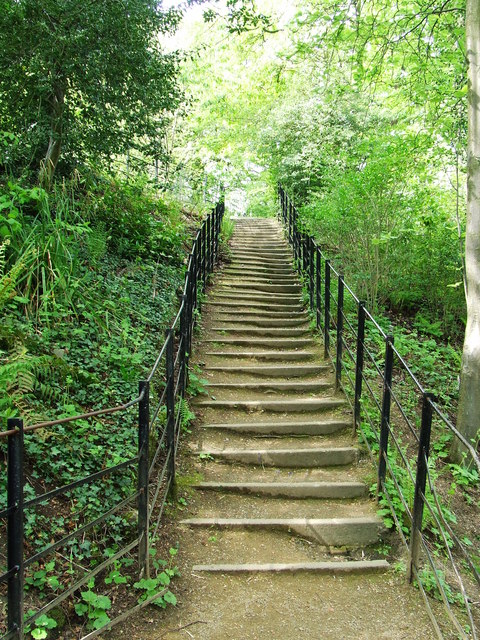
Steps running down to the River Kelvin

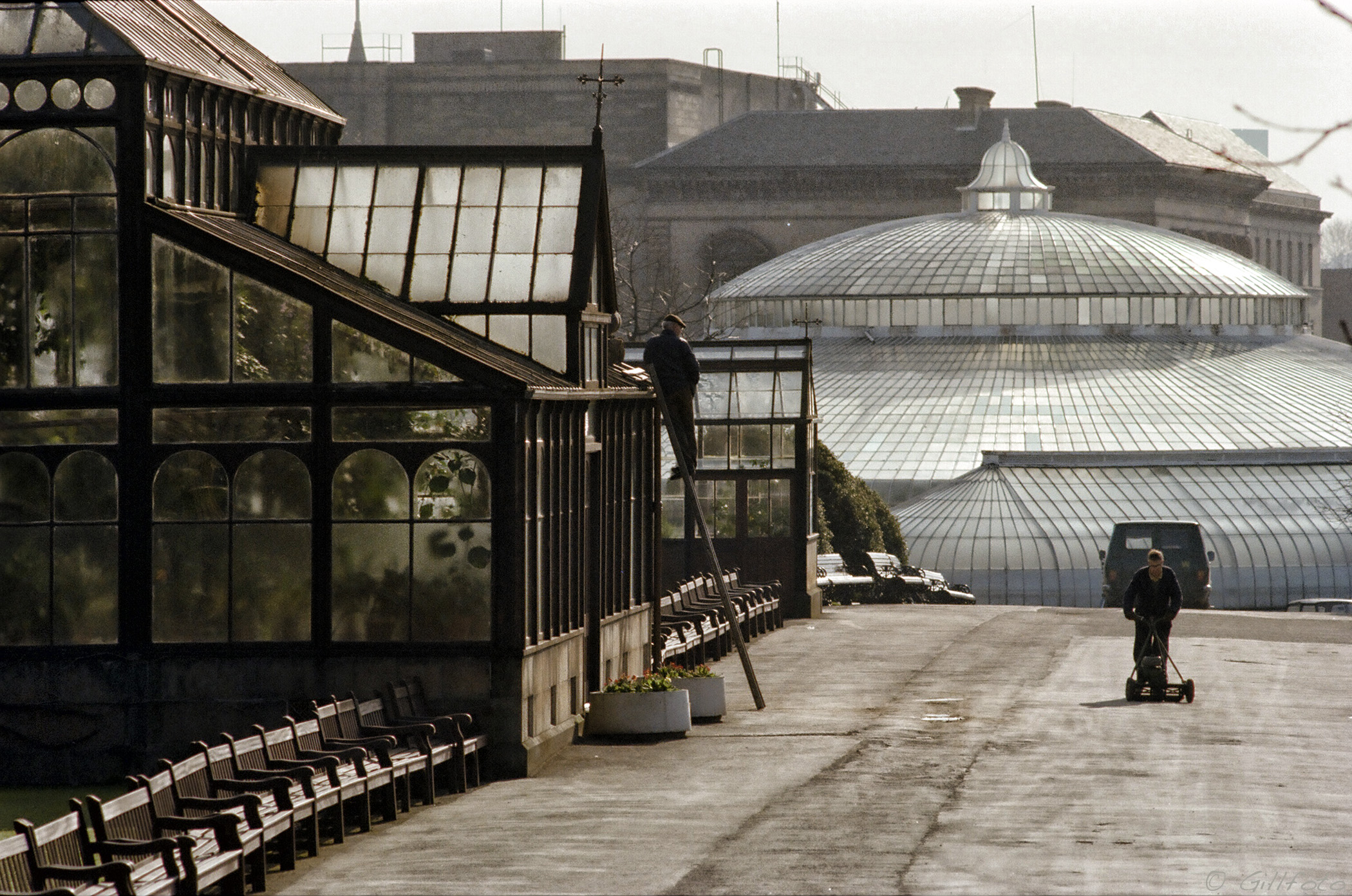
The Gardens (c. 1975).

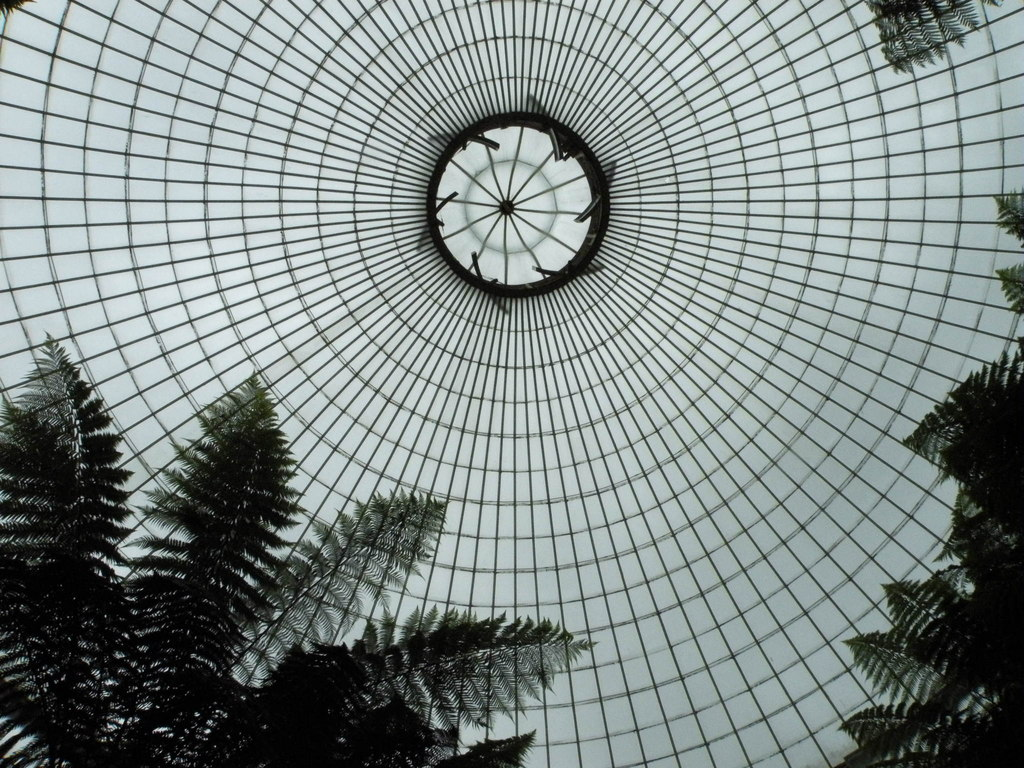
Ceiling of the Kibble Palace
