= Hugh McInnes =

Recipient of the Victoria Cross

- Born: October 1815; Glasgow, Scotland
- Died: 7 December 1879 (aged 64); Glasgow
- Burial place: St Peter's RC Cemetery, London Road, Glasgow
- Military career
- Allegiance: United Kingdom
- Branch: Bengal Army
- Rank: Gunner
- Units: Bengal Artillery
- Conflicts: Indian Mutiny
- Awards: Victoria Cross

Hugh McInnes VC (October 1815 – 7 December 1879) was a Scottish recipient of the Victoria Cross.

== Details ==
McInnes was about 42 years old, and a gunner in the Bengal Artillery, Bengal Army during the Indian Mutiny when the following deeds took place at the Relief of Lucknow for which he was awarded the VC:

Elected respectively, under the 13th clause of the Royal Warrant of 29 January 1856, by the Officers and non-commissioned officers generally, and by the private soldiers of each troop or battery, for conspicuous gallantry at the relief of Lucknow, from the 14th to 22 November 1857.
