= Braidfauld =

Area of Glasgow, Scotland

Coordinates: 55.840160°N 4.179191°W

- Location within the Glasgow City council area Location within Scotland
- OS grid reference: NS633632
- Council area: Glasgow City
- Lieutenancy area: Glasgow
- Country: Scotland
- Sovereign state: United Kingdom
- Post town: Glasgow
- Postcode district: G32 8
- Dialling code: 0141
- Police: Scotland
- Fire: Scottish
- Ambulance: Scottish
- UK Parliament: Glasgow East
- Scottish Parliament: Glasgow Shettleston

Braidfauld is a small area of Glasgow, Scotland which is in the East End of the city slightly north of the River Clyde and south of the Tollcross area. It was also the name of the 45th ward of Glasgow City Council, prior to the re-organisation into multi-member wards in 2007.

Braidfauld ward, extending from Parkhead to Sandyhills, was an artificial creation and few residents recognised the name other than as a sub-district of the area, feeling more affinity (depending on where they lived) with neighbouring areas such as Lilybank, Parkhead and Tollcross. It is now within the larger Shettleston ward.

== Origins of name ==
The neighbourhood is named after Braidfauld Farm, which is mentioned on local maps until the 1930s, at the junction of London Road with the now Braidfauld Avenue. "Braid" is Old Scots for the top of a slope. A "fauld" was the poorer part of the village fields left fallow until manured by grazing sheep or cattle. "Braidfauld" was the "fallow land at the top of the slope". Similarly, "Maukinfauld" was the "fallow land pestered by hares" ("maulkens" in Scots). Braidfauld Street ran to a farm of that name, as Maukinfauld Road, in the middle of the district, ran to the farm after which it is named.

== History ==
=== Auchenshuggle ===
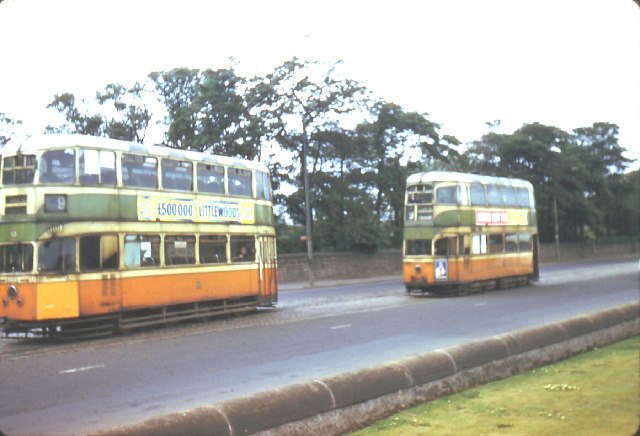
Trams at Auchenshuggle terminus in June 1962

Braidfauld Street was the terminus of the Number 9 tram, opposite the Auchenshuggle woods. Auchenshuggle was a hamlet slightly to the north east, and was part of the Easterhill Estate, which ran down to the River Clyde. Easterhill House, erected as a country retreat by Glasgow merchants in the 19th century has been demolished. Other farms underlying modern Braidfauld were Braidfauld and Maukinfauld farms and Newbank House (all mentioned on an 1865 map). Lilybank is not mentioned on any earlier map and is named after the a boiler works already existing there, John Thomson (Wilson Boilers), whose original works were in Lilybank Road, near Eglington Toll.

=== Dalbeth ===
Beyond the woods is the site of the Dalbeth Estate. The estate was primarily a country retreat, but the owners worked the freestone and coal underneath. It is even said some local gold was found while, in the shallows of the Clyde large mussel-like bi-valves often provided serviceable pearls. Here Thomas Hopkirk established the prize collection of rare plants which became the basis of the Glasgow Botanic Gardens in the West-end.

Later, in 1850, Dalbeth returned (after 300 years) to the possession of the Roman Catholic Church. The Congregation of Our Lady of Charity of the Good Shepherd established a Magdalene Asylum, where unmarried mothers could work out their penitence. In 1865, they established a Girls' Reformatory. A Boy's Reformatory was established later, slightly further west, in Westthorn Mills. A Church designed by Peter Paul Pugin (1851–1904), (brother of E.W. Pugin) in typical ornate style, with three naves, was opened in 1902. A Polish Education Centre was established during the Second World War, so that soldiers in the Free Polish Army could complete their (Polish) secondary education there (from a newspaper clipping of April 1944). It became the Parish Church in 1948 and the Reformatory buildings became the Good Shepherd R.C. Primary School. The Church and school were closed in 1975 and in 1996 demolished, along with the Primary School/Reformatory Buildings. The land is now used as an extension to Dalbeth Cemetery.

Like the other great houses erected by Glasgow merchants, Dalbeth House has disappeared, as has the 19th-century convent, though the administration building of the cemetery may incorporate parts of both. The sisters' cemetery is still there, slightly to the side of the much larger St Peter's Cemetery, Dalbeth, which included a Jews' Cemetery in the 19th century. There are distinctive Polish and Italian parts of the cemetery, and many locally famous Catholics (including John Wheatley) are buried there.

=== Govancroft Pottery 1911–1981 ===
Across London Road, at the corner of Potter Street, was the substantial Govancroft Pottery. At one point this had (according to the Pottery Society), "a monopoly of (ceramic) jam jars" which it exported throughout the world. Latterly, it produced distinctive thistle shaped ware. A quick search on the website indicates that there is still a substantial trade among collectors for them. The pottery was closed in 1981. A set of modern houses has taken their place, called "The Potteries".

=== Westthorn ===
Further west again (close by the Glasgow Celtic supporters' club) is what remains of Westthorn Park (the allotments only, the cycle track and football fields having been removed). The beauty of the sylvan, meandering Clyde at Westthorn was described rapturously in the First Statistical Account of Scotland (1791–1799) and again in Rambles Around Glasgow of 1835. It still feels very surprisingly remote and is still beautiful. Westthorn was the site of riots in the early 19th century. Thomas Harvie became the new owner of Westthorn House and estate. He tried to cut off a right of way (from Dalmarnock to Carmyle) in 1819. The riots were put down by the military (the Enniskillen Dragoons) under the direction of the Sheriff. However, the locals, supported by a fund raised by Glasgow democrats, took Harvie to court - all the way to the House of Lords - and eventually won their case. Mr Harvie owned a distillery in Port Dundas. Nowadays the site of Westthorn House is occupied by a bottling plant for John Dewar and Sons.

== Buildings ==
=== 18th century ===
The east end of Glasgow was initially the preferred choice area of Glasgow's tobacco merchants and they built several country estates in the Braidfauld and surrounding area. None of these buildings survives, all having been demolished and the estates turned into housing. The estates included Easterhill House, Dalbeth House, Westthorn House and Belvidere House - each was photographed in the late 19th century by Thomas Annan. The buildings at the entrance to 1920 London Road are the remains of the lodge house for Dalbeth House.

The Farm Shop in Cuthelton Street was part of the 18th-century farm in that area.

=== 19th century ===
The administration building for St Peter's Cemetery, Dalbeth was part of the 19th-century Convent of the Good Shepherd and may incorporate part of the original Dalbeth House. Eastwards of the entrance to the driveway is a much remodelled 19th-century cottage, set back from the road at the entrance to the Nuns' Cemetery.

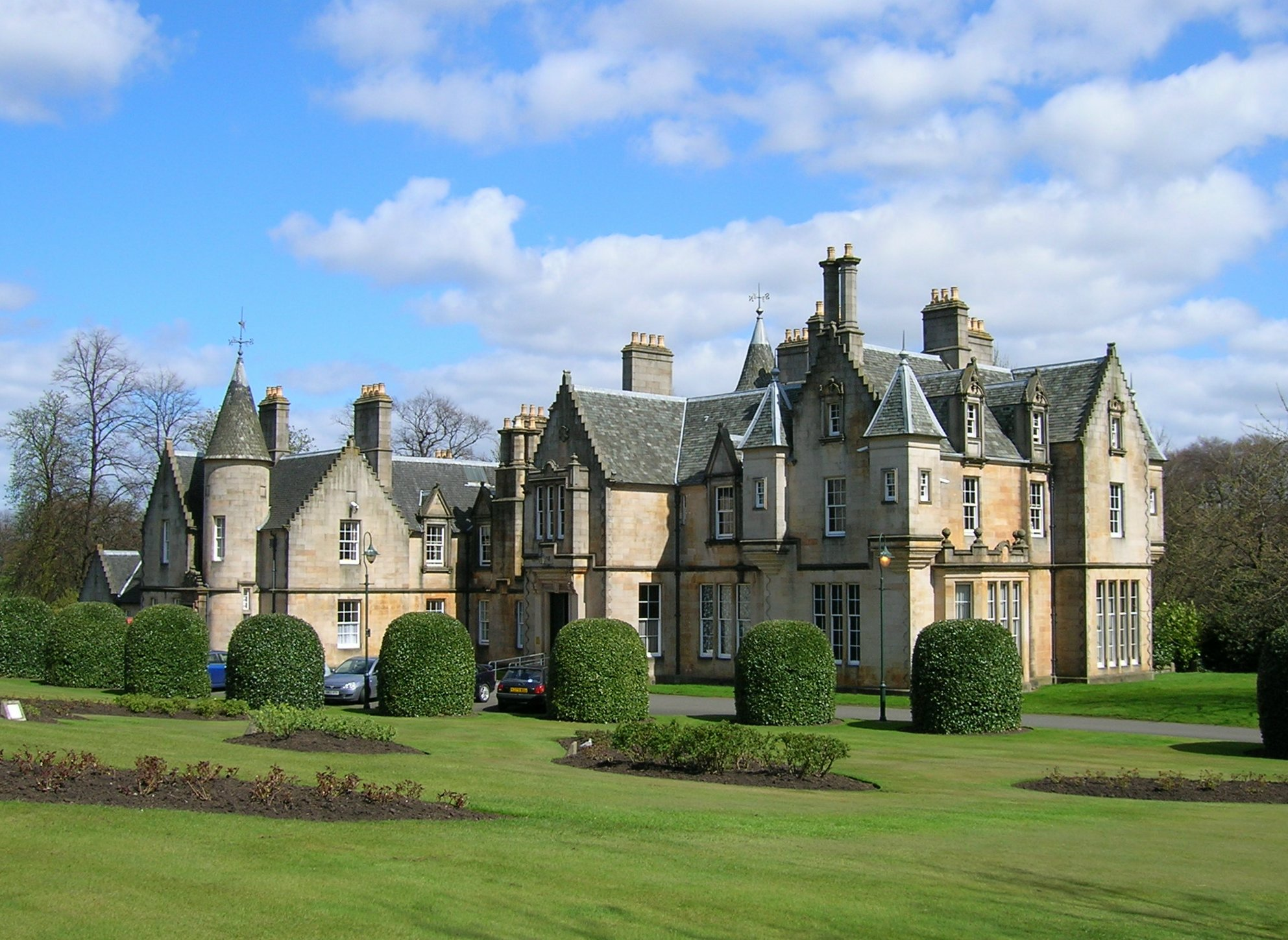
Tollcross House, 1848

One-half mile (800 metres) westwards on London Road, opposite the entrance to the former Belvidere Hospital, is a much re-modelled two storey family house, possibly related to the original farm. It is of locally quarried sandstone and is probably of about the middle of the 19th century. All that remains of the ruins of Belvidere Hospital is the imposing, Administration Building, in classical style and of the same grey sandstone.

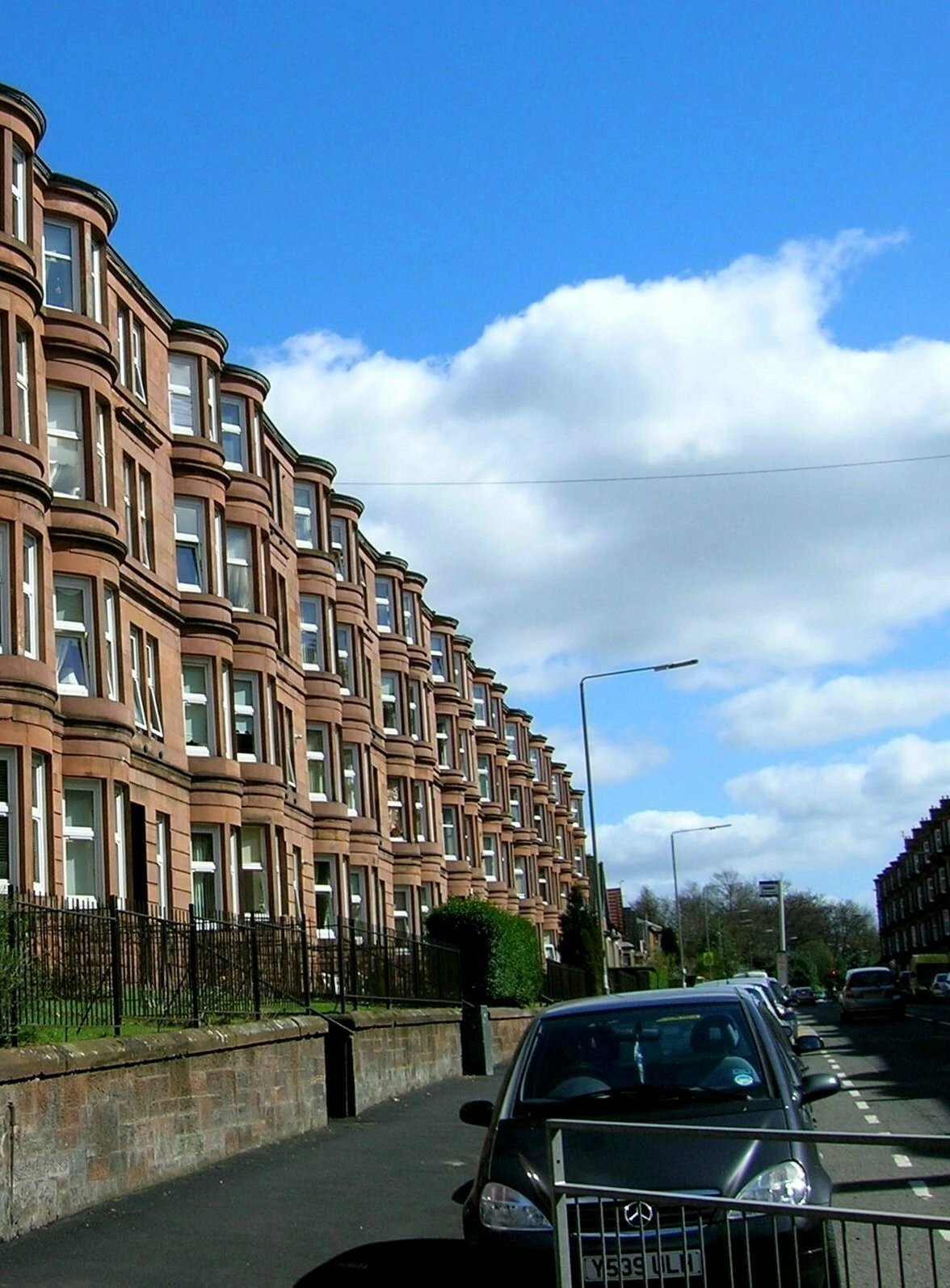
Red sandstone flats in Tollcross Road

Overlooking Tollcross Road, and set in its original grounds, is Tollcross House, built in 1848. It was built (of gray ashlar) for one of the partners of Clyde Iron Works, James Dunlop. The architect was David Bryce who also designed Fettes College in Edinburgh and Balfour Castle in Orkney which shares with Tollross House the Scots Baronial style of crowstepped gables, circular towers with conical caps, massed chimneys and mullioned windows. The family gave up living there as tenements invaded the surrounding area. The grounds became Tollcross Park in 1897 and the buildings became a Children's Museum, housing the locally famous “Who killed Cock Robin?” display of stuffed birds, small mammals and insects. It also had the last deer shot in the park -"Bobbie" - stuffed and on display. The building was turned into flats in 1998, and the display moved to the Forge shopping mall one mile (1.5 kilometres) away.

With the coming of railways, sandstone could be easily transported over long distances and buildings began to be built of an attractive red sandstone, usually quarried at Lockerbie. A two-storey family house in the middle of the drive to St Peter's Cemetery at 1920 London Road is of red brick, rather than sandstone. More imposing is the line of four-storey red sandstone tenement flats, known as the Deer Park flats, built at the turn of the century along Tollcross Road, opposite Tollcross Park and running towards Parkhead Cross. These tenements have repeating, rounded, bow windows. (At the juncture with Maukinfauld Road, shops and a pub formed the ground floor. There is also a small shop built into the middle of the tenements opposite the main park gates).

=== 20th century ===
Between Maukinfauld Road and Braidfauld Street is a post-World War II development of low-rise houses, many semi-detached or short terraces. A range of low-rise "maisonette"-type houses, some in closes, some short terraces, were built in Glenisla Street in the 1960s. They are brick built and roof-tiled.

In the 1980s, the council began releasing land for private development (something it had previously declined to do). Eastwards along the railway, new houses were erected in the 1990s as was a development known as The Potteries (on the site of the old Govancroft Pottery). On Tollcross Road, east of the Deer Park tenements, flats in an extensive, super-modern block was built in 2005.

=== Industrial and commercial ===
The only major industrial or commercial buildings are the United Biscuits factory in Clydeford Drive and a range of hangar-type developments along the London Road in the old Westthorn estate, mostly concerned with bottling or storing whiskey (Allied Distillers and John Dewar & Sons Ltd).

== Famous residents ==
- Thomas Hopkirk (1785–1841) assembled a huge collection of plants at his estate in Dalbeth and published a comprehensive Flora - one of the first. He was one of the founders of what was to become the Glasgow Botanic Gardens. He donated his collection of plants to start it off. There is a Hopkirk Laboratory in Glasgow University named after him.
- John Quinton Pringle (1864–1925) was born in Dennistoun, Glasgow and later lived in Maukinfauld Road, Tollcross. After leaving school at twelve and serving an apprenticeship as an optician, he set up his own business in his early 30s. From 1865, he attended evening classes in Glasgow School of Art. He painted comparatively few works, and most were small scale and were of his relatives, friends and the local area. He did not exhibit a lot during his lifetime. One of his paintings in the Kelvingrove Art Galleries is of the view from his flat in Maukinfauld Road - across open countryside to St Margaret's Church, Braifauld Street, with a train steaming up the line from Parkhead Station to Tollcross. His work can be seen at Kelvingrove, at the National Gallery of Scotland in Edinburgh, the Tate Britain in London, and as part of the Government Art Collection (GAC). Many can be viewed on-line.
- John Wheatley (1869–1930), MP, represented the Glasgow Shettleston constituency in the House of Commons. He was Minister for Health in 1924, in Ramsay MacDonald's first Labour Government, when he passed the Housing Act mentioned above. He is buried in St Peter's Cemetery Dalbeth.
- Jack House (1906–1991) was a locally renowned journalist, historian and novelist. He was born in 13 Deerpark Gardens, on Tollcross Road, opposite the park, though he moved to Dennistoun when he was two.
- Susan Baird (1949–2009) represented Braidfauld from 1974 and was Lord Provost of Glasgow between 1988 and 1992. She lives in the constituency.
- Kay Carmichael Social activist who lived on benefits in the area for a short time to find out about the conditions.

== Bibliography ==
- Burt, John ‘Working Class Housing in Glasgow’ in S D Chapman (ed) ‘The History of Working Class Housing’ David and Charles 1971.
- Corporation of Glasgow ‘Short Account of the Municipal Undertakings of the City of Glasgow.’ 1938
- Corporation of Glasgow Housing Department ‘Review of Operations 1919 - 1937’ (1937)
- Damer, Seàn & Hartstone, Linda ‘A Social History of Glasgow Housing 1919 to 1965’ Appendix III Articles, from Déviance et Société Vol 15 No 3 pp 293–299 1991
- Damer, Seàn ‘From Moorpark to "Wine Alley"- the rise and fall of a Glasgow housing scheme.’ Edinburgh Education and Society Series, Edinburgh 1989. ISBN 0-85224-622-6/ 0 85224 657 9 pbk
- Gibb, Andrew ‘The Development of Public Sector Housing in Glasgow’ (University of Glasgow, 1982)
- Gibb, Andrew ‘Glasgow: the making of a city’ (1983)
- Jury, A. G., Housing Centenary: A Review of Municipal Housing in Glasgow from 1866 to 1966,(Glasgow, 1966).
- McLellan, D (ed) ‘No Mean City to Miles Better’ (1988)
- Mooney, Gerry ‘Living in the periphery: housing, industrial change and the state’ (1988 - unpublished PhD thesis, University of Glasgow; copy Mitchell Library Glagow ref f363.50941443 MOO).
- Niven, D ‘The Development of Public Housing in Scotland’ Croom Helm (London 1979)
- Pacione, Michael ‘Housing Policies in Glasgow since 1880’ Geographical Review Vol. 69 No.1 (Copy in Mitchell Library Glasgow ref GC f 363.5094 1443 PAC H)
- Pacione, M., Glasgow, The Socio-Spatial Development of the city,(Chichester, 1995).
- Smith, John G and Mitchell, John O ‘The Old Country Houses of the Old Glasgow Gentry’ 2nd ed 1878)
- Strathclyde Regional Archivist ‘Housing in 20th Century Glasgow: Documents 1914-1990s’ from Housing in Glasgow - plans, studies and datasets.
- Williamson, Elizabeth, Ritches, Anne & Higgs, Malcolm ‘The Buildings of Scotland: Glasgow’ Penguin Books in association with the National Trust for Scotland 1990
- Worsdall, Frank ‘The Tenement - a way of life. A social, historical and architectural study of housing in Glasgow’ W & R Chambers Ltd, Edinburgh 1979 ISBN 0-550-20352-4

=== Other resources ===
- BBC Scotland/ Carmichael, Kay - three-part documentary on the Lilybank scheme, Glasgow 1977 (BBC archives)
