= Thomas Hopkirk =

Scottish botanist and lithographer

Thomas Hopkirk (1785–1841) was a Scottish botanist and lithographer.

== The Hopkirks ==
He was descended from a gentry family who came from Hopekirk, near Hawick, by way of Dalkeith in Midlothian, to Dalbeth in Glasgow. His grandfather, also Thomas (1716–1781 ) had been a wealthy Glasgow merchant – a "Tobacco Lord" or "Virginia Don" – who had diversified into coal mining, brewing and banking. He had lived originally in a tenement in the High Street of Glasgow, called "Hopkirk's Land". David Dale rented the shop premises on the ground floor, where he operated as the first Glasgow agent of the Royal Bank of Scotland. Thomas then moved to a fine house at the corner of Argyle Street and Dunlop Street, which became the Buck's Head Hotel. (This was demolished in 1865; the later department store still displays the Buck on its roof.)

=== James Hopkirk (1749–1838), Thomas's father ===
In 1754, Thomas senior bought the lands of Dalbeth, which then included "Wester Dalbeth" (now Westthorn and Belvidere) and the "Newlands of Dalbeth" (now Newlands). As well as exploiting the coals of that area, he occupied a mansion house, described in Queen Anne's time as " a pleasant and convenient seat". Thomas Senior's son, James Hopkirk, ( 1739–1835 ) was also a successful Glasgow merchant (Chairman of the Chamber of Commerce in 1808. He wrote A Statistical Account of the Barony Parish of Glasgow when he was in his 76th year. This contains many fine line drawings of locations in Glasgow, some the only ones surviving. However he did not publish this. He developed the coal seams at Dalbeth and formed many lucrative partnerships, especially with Robert Finlay. In 1809 he replaced his father's building with a substantial house and it was here that Thomas Hopkirk, the botanist and lithographer, was born on 4 July 1785 . His mother, Christian Glassford, was the daughter of another famous Glasgow merchant, after whom "Glassford Street" is named. James was granted a coat of arms by the Lord Lyon King of Arms in 1815 and was recognised as the Chief of the name of Hopkirks in Scotland. The motto on the arms was "SPERO PROCEDERE" (that is, " I hope to progress").

== Thomas's education and first publication ==
After schooling in Glasgow, the young Thomas enrolled at the University of Glasgow in 1800. In 1813 he published one of the earliest Flora in Britain – Flora Glottiana: a catalogue of the indigenous plants on the banks of the River Clyde, and in the neighbourhood of the City of Glasgow. This catalogues plants found along both banks of the Clyde "from its Falls (at Lanark).. to its juncture with the sea (at Bowling)". He deals with over 1000 plants, most of which he had found himself. "..no plant is inserted that I have not myself found, without giving the authority for it." He claims to have used the system of Dr Smith's Flora Britannica (2 vols 1800). Dr Smith was the founder of the Linnean Society, whose members' help is mentioned in the book, so the system is really the standard Linnaean system of the time. He gives Latin names and flowering times but no illustration or description. He does, however, give a brief description of habitat and, reading the catalogue, you get a vivid sense of Hopkirk wading along the river, or peering into ditches or odd places in search of his plants. He seems to have enjoyed it hugely. "For beauty, richness, and variety, the district of Clydesdale can scarcely perhaps be equalled." One typical catalogue entry reads (with a misprint) "CIRCOEA (corrected to CIRCAEA) Flor. Brit. 13 lutetiana c. Common Enchanter's Nightshade. Perennial. June, July. In shady places and woods, occasionally. In the woods of Cambuslang. Plantations between Easterhill and Clyde Iron Works."

He amassed an extensive collection in his garden in Dalbeth, of which he published a full list. He became a Justice of the Peace for Lanarkshire and was elected a Fellow of the Linnean Society in 1812 .

== Royal Botanic Institution of Glasgow ==
In 1816 he joined with others to form a society, later including William Jackson Hooker, Regius Professor of Botany at the University of Glasgow, with the intention of displaying botanical specimens, including his Dalbeth collection. About 8 acres (3.2 ha) of land were laid out in 1817 at Sandyford, near Sauchiehall Street, Glasgow. In 1817, the Royal Botanic Institution of Glasgow was formed by royal charter and the Glasgow Botanic Gardens set up. As the City expanded westwards, the gardens had to move and in 1842, they were opened by the banks of the River Kelvin in the west-end of the city, where they remain to this day.

== Flora Anomoia and Darwin ==
In 1817 he published Flora Anomoia – a general view of the anomalies in the vegetable kingdom, describing "the anomalies which take place amongst vegetables. It lists the variations under Anomalies of the Root, Stem and Branches, Leaf, and Flower. He notes such unusual developments as an oblong turnip, the different kinds of Holly leaf, a bluebell with 20 stamens, and so on. Lithographic illustrations were by his co-worker James Hardie.

He was known to Charles Darwin, who quoted from Hopkirk's publications in his The Variation of Animals and Plants Under Domestication. (John Murray, London 1868), especially with regard to Convolvulus tricolor.

== Lithography ==
Partly as a consequence of his botanical publications, he became interested in lithography. He helped prepare the lithographic plates for The Glasgow Looking Glass, of which he became editor in 1825.

== Later life and death ==
In 1835, the University of Glasgow made him honorary Doctor of Laws. In 1837, he published the popular gardening book, called The Juvenile Calendar of a Natural History of the Year. He moved to Ireland, where he helped in geological surveys for the Irish Ordnance Survey. He presumably married there, but we know little about his wife, who died before him, or their daughter. He died in Belfast on 24 August 1841 and is buried there in Clifton Cemetery.

Glasgow University named the Hopkirk Laboratory for taxonomic biology after him. There is also a Hopkirk Building in Glasgow Botanic Gardens.

Thomas's dedication on Flora Glottiana in the Mitchell Library Glasgow

== Bibliography ==
- Dictionary of National Biography (Oxford, 2004) ISBN 0-19-861395-4
- Hopkirk, Thomas Flora Glottiana; a catalogue of the indigenous plants on the banks of the River Clyde, and in the neighbourhood of the City of Glasgow. 8 vols Glasgow 1813
- Hopkirk, Thomas. (1817) updated by Martin Cragg-Barber in Flora anomoia updated Chippenham : That Plant's Odd, 1999.
- Mackenzie, Peter. Old Reminiscences of Glasgow. Glasgow, 1890 ii, 33
- Turner, Robert. Thomas Hopkirk of Dalbeth: a sketch of his life and botanical work. Transactions of the Natural History Society of Glasgow. 27 January 1885
- Biographical note on James Hopkirk. By David Murray. In A Statistical Account of the Barony Parish of Glasgow, with the principal transactions of the Heritors for the last forty years, 1827, manuscript by James Hopkirk. Line drawings by unknown artist.
