= Tollcross, Glasgow =

Area of Glasgow, Scotland

Coordinates: 55.8437°N 4.1719°W

Tollcross: Scottish Gaelic: Toll na Croise
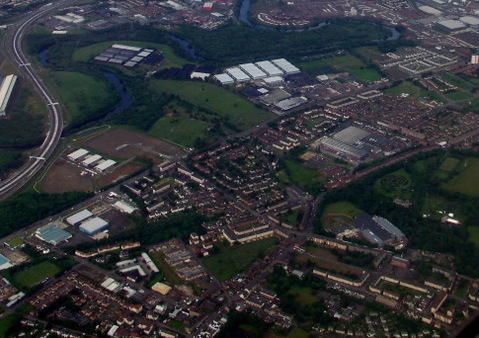
- Aerial view of Tollcross from the north-east (2012)

- Location within Glasgow
- OS grid reference: NS641633
- Council area: Glasgow City Council
- Lieutenancy area: Glasgow
- Country: Scotland
- Sovereign state: United Kingdom
- Post town: GLASGOW
- Postcode district: G32
- Dialling code: 0141
- Police: Scotland
- Fire: Scottish
- Ambulance: Scottish
- UK Parliament: Glasgow East
- Scottish Parliament: Glasgow Shettleston

Tollcross (t-oal-cross) (Scottish Gaelic: Toll na Croise) is an area north of the River Clyde in Glasgow and has a popular park, opened in 1897, which is famed for its international rose trials. It lies approximately a mile east of the neighbouring suburb of Parkhead, and just north of Braidfauld and south of Shettleston. Tollcross was incorporated into the City of Glasgow in 1912.

== History ==
During the industrial age the area was a major centre of employment, largely because of the Fullarton steel works (now occupied by housing). McVitie's biscuit factory was one of the main employers in the area before its closure in 2022: its facility had been active in the area since the 1920s.

Many residents of the Lilybank housing estate would consider themselves residents of Tollcross, but they, like the biscuit factory, were officially placed within the separate Braidfauld Ward of Glasgow City Council until its reorganisation in 2007; since then, Maukinfauld Road has been the local administrative boundary, with land to the west in the Calton ward and land to the east in Shettleston ward along with the rest of Tollcross.

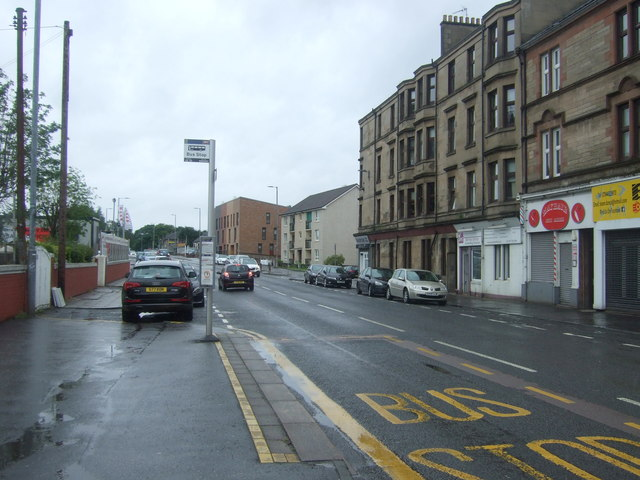
Tollcross Road

Part of the Tollcross area was formerly known as Egypt, and is still marked so on a number of maps; the name is believed to have been derived from a farm that existed at one time in the vicinity, operated by a former soldier who had been stationed in Egypt. The farm was owned by the Gordon family in the 1920s before being sold to the Hamilton family.

The poet William Miller, author of "Wee Willie Winkie", is buried in Tollcross.

In June 2011, pupils from St. Aidan's and St. Joan of Arc School combined into a new school located on Fullarton Avenue. They voted to call the new school Cardinal Winning, after Thomas Winning, the late Archbishop of Glasgow who died in 2001; the new school opened on 21 June 2011.

Just south of the school is Fullarton Park, home to the local football club Vale of Clyde, and the Tollcross Bowling Club adjacent to a modern retail park on London Road.

== Tollcross Park and Winter Gardens ==
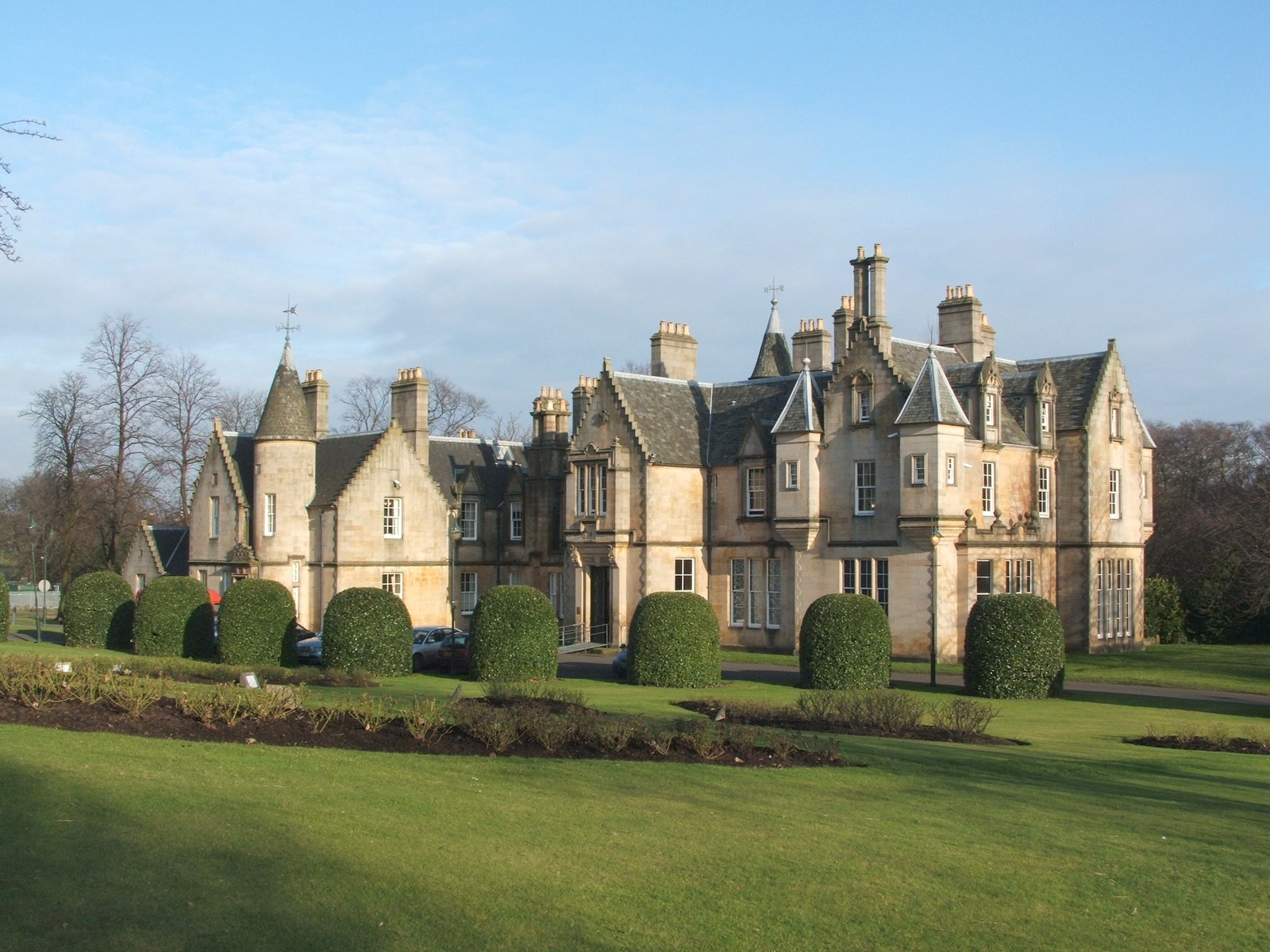
Tollcross House

Tollcross House was built in 1848 for James Dunlop, who was one of the owners of the Clyde Iron Works. David Bryce and William Burn were the architects and the building replaced a substantial house that the original owners of the estate, the Corbets, had occupied. In 1897 the house, now within the centre of the public park, became a Children's Museum; it was converted into flats in 1989, and then into accommodation for the elderly in 2003.

Tollcross Park occupies an area of 37 hectares (91 acres) between Shettleston and Tollcross. It opened in 1897, having been purchased by Glasgow Corporation from the Dunlop family. In 2008, Tollcross was voted the best park in Scotland; its features include a children's farm based around the former main lodge building at its eastern side, the rose garden in the southern section (set out in 1986, which holds annual cultivation trials), playing fields in the north part and a secret garden area.

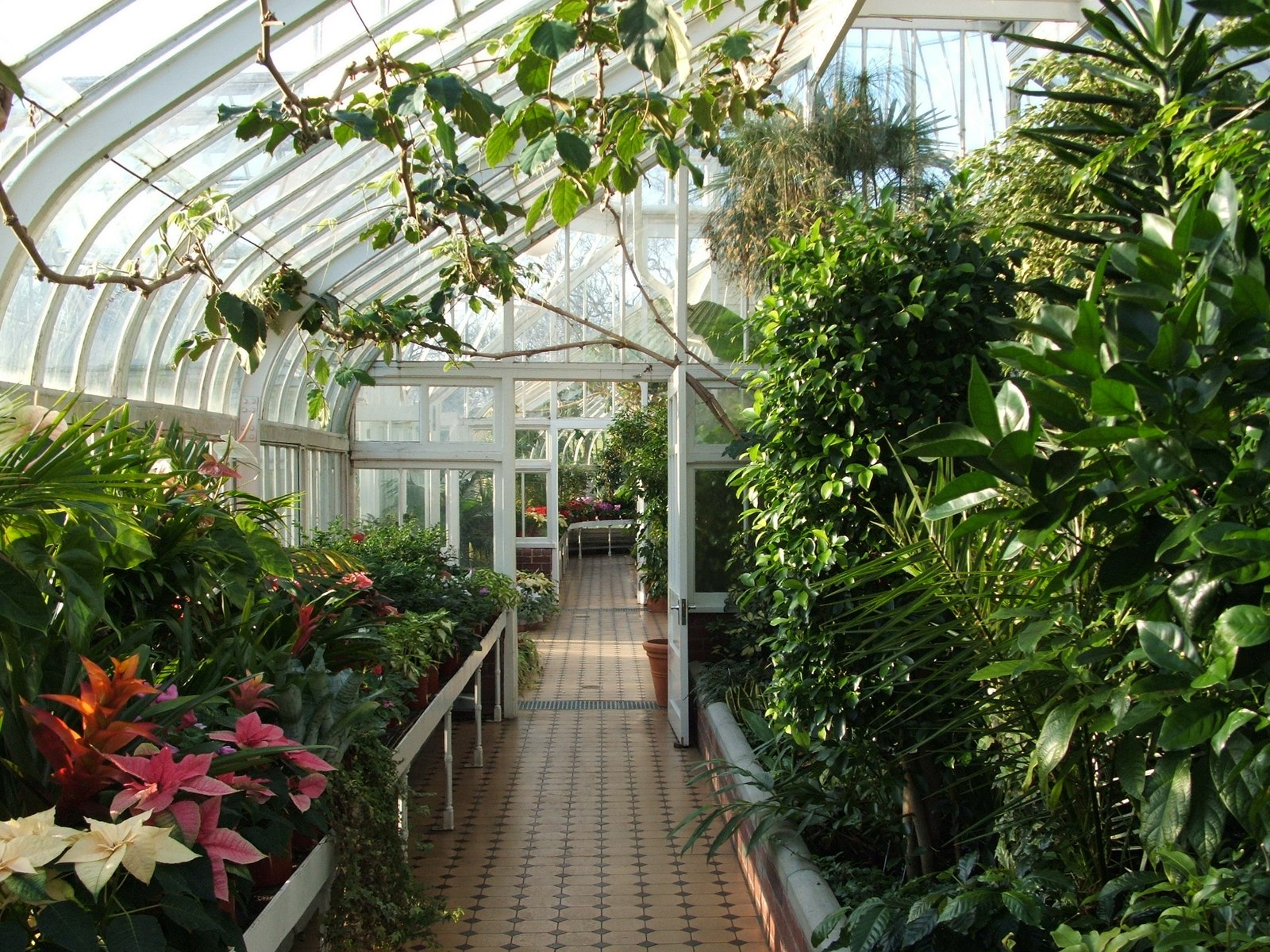
The interior of Tollcross Winter Garden in 2006.

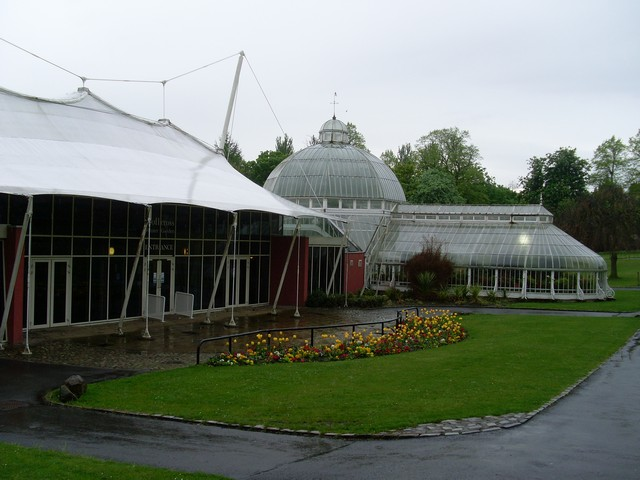
The Winter Gardens complex in 2009 prior to storm damage.

The Tollcross conservatories were originally erected in 1870 at Redholm in Ardrossan, North Ayrshire. Baillie A.G. MacDonald of Redholm gifted them to the Glasgow Corporation in 1898 as a gesture to commemorate his links with the area. They were carefully dismantled and re-erected at their present-day site. The Tollcross cast-iron Victorian conservatory (NS 63659 63721), is a B-Listed structure, known as the 'Winter Gardens'. It is Latin-cross shaped in layout, has two semicircular ends and is crowned with a dome. The scrolled cast iron buttresses are a notable feature.

The conservatory suffered storm damage in December 2010 and January 2011. The conservatory and associated building have been closed since that time. The Winter Gardens are on the 'register of buildings at risk in Scotland'.

The Winter Gardens underwent a £1.9 million refurbishment between 1998 and 2000 carried out by a partnership of the Heritage Lottery Fund, Historic Environment Scotland and Glasgow City Council. A tent-like extension was built to house a cafe and toilets, and after being closed for fourteen years the Winter Gardens were reopened in November 2000.

In 1997, the East End Leisure Centre opened in Tollcross Park, with an Olympic-sized swimming pool which is used by the City of Glasgow Swim Team. It was renamed the Tollcross International Swimming Centre and renovated to serve as the swimming venue of the 2014 Commonwealth Games held in the city.

A "Secret Garden", accessible through a hidden gate, is located near the Winter Gardens. It was built as a quiet, secluded area within the park.

The park contains several memorials to influential figures in the community, in the form of benches, QR codes and headstones.

== Notable people ==
- Jack House (1906-1991) Journalist and author
- Tom Leslie (1884–1961), footballer
