= A723 road =

Road in Scotland

Coordinates: 55.77805°N 4.02343°W

A723

Route information
- Length: 13.2 mi (21.2 km)

Major junctions
- Southwest end: Strathaven
- Northeast end: Holytown

Location
- Country: United Kingdom
- Constituent country: Scotland

Road network
- Roads in the United Kingdom; Motorways; A and B road zones
← A722	→ A724

The A723 road in Scotland runs through South Lanarkshire and North Lanarkshire, serving as a main route within Strathaven, Hamilton and Motherwell, facilitating access to the M74 motorway and M8 motorway for the communities south-east of Glasgow.

== Route ==
=== Strathaven and Hamilton ===
At its southern end, the A723 begins in the market town of Strathaven in South Lanarkshire, at a junction with the A71 (running between Ayrshire and Edinburgh). As Townhead Street it runs north-east, close to Strathaven Academy and just north of the historic heart of the community the Common Green. Turning north as Glasgow Road, the A723 turns east as Commercial Road but the northbound continuation becomes the A726, another route of regional importance which heads north to East Kilbride. The A723 soon also turns north and heads through the fields of Avondale.

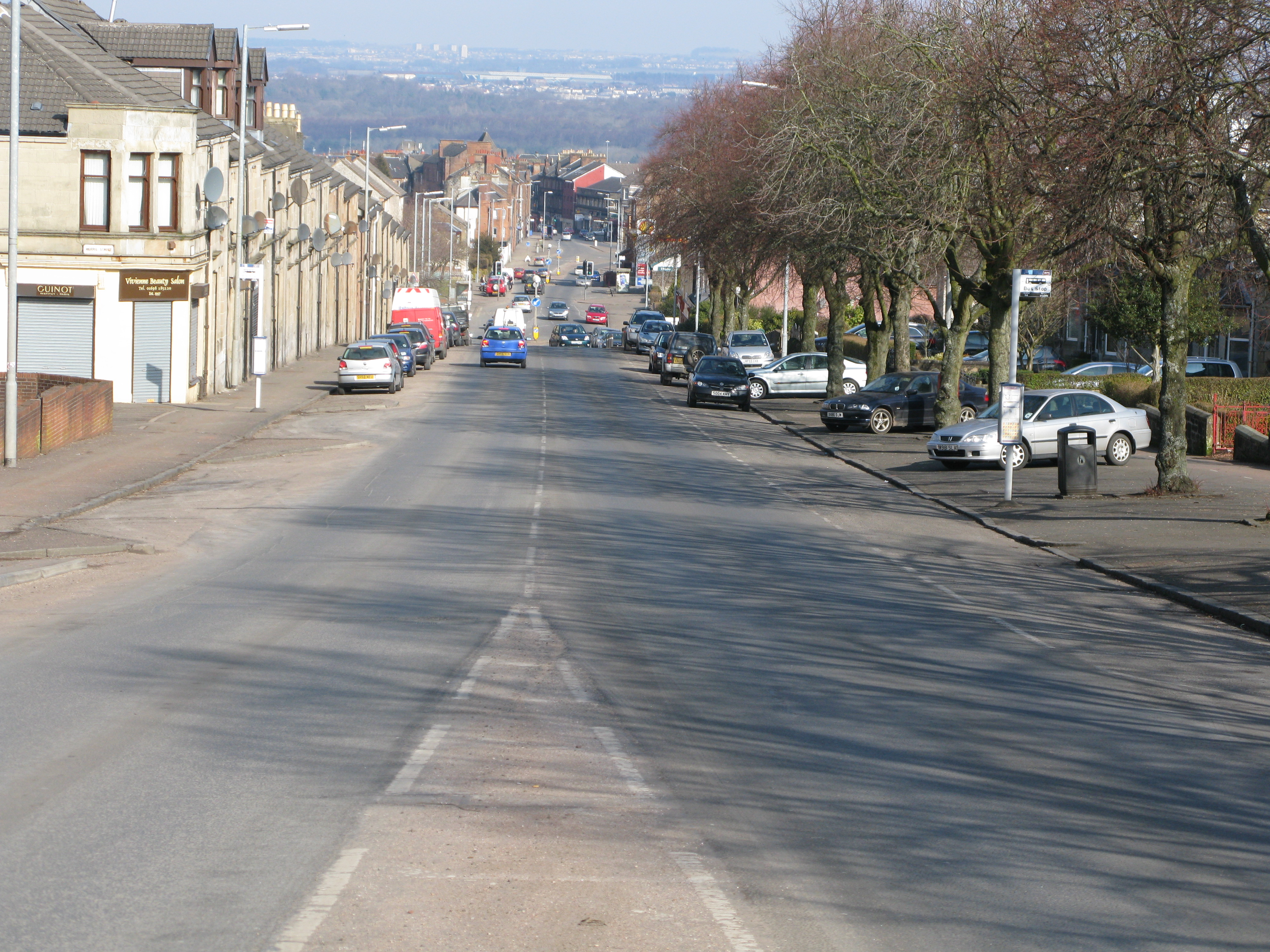
Heading north and downhill on Low Waters Road

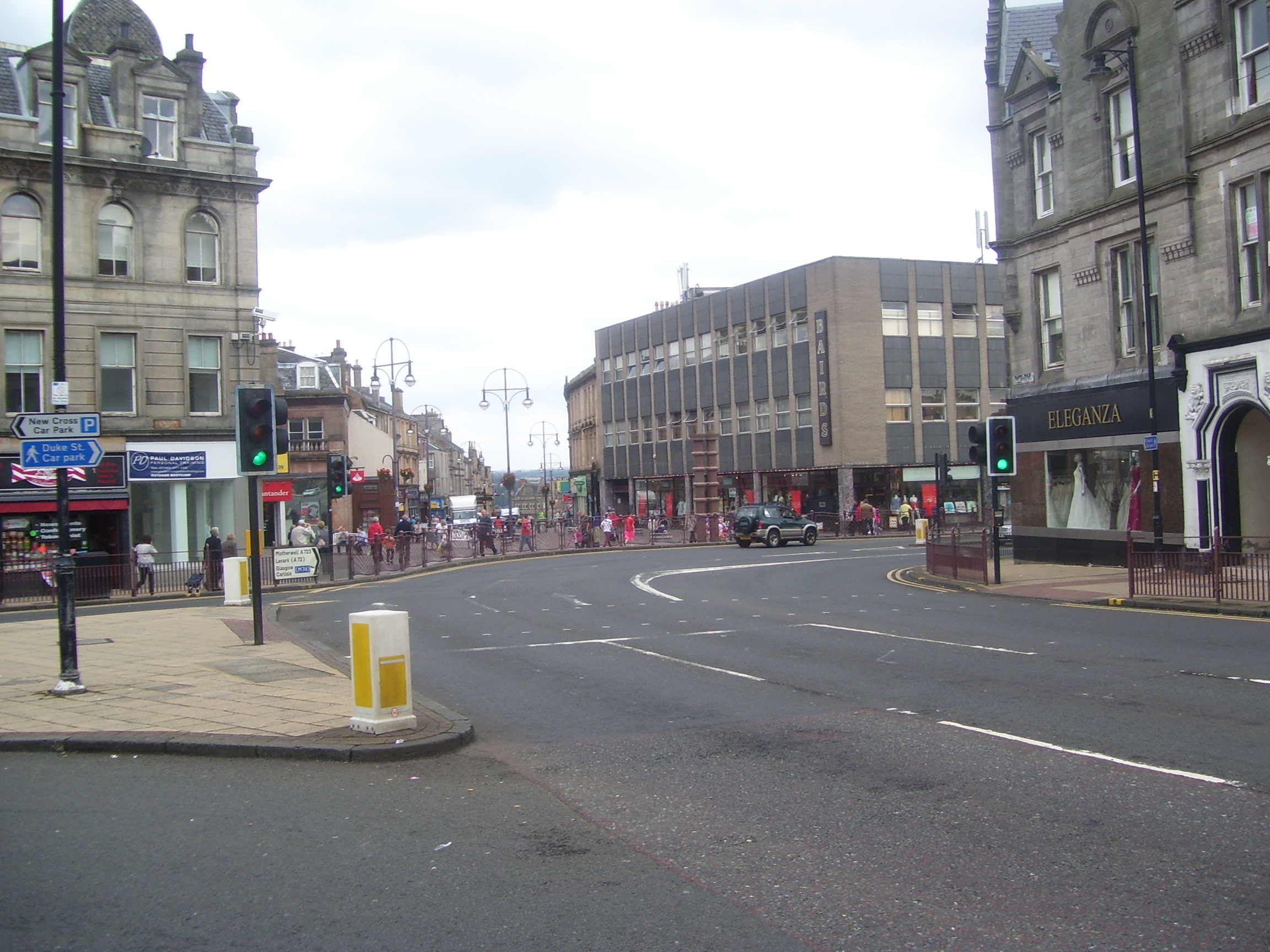
Looking north as the A723 turns east at Hamilton 'Top Cross'

After a rural section of around 4 miles (6.4 km) it reaches the southern periphery of Hamilton, the county town of Lanarkshire, where modern housing developments have gradually spread over fields in the early 21st century. Known as Strathaven Road, Low Waters Road, Portland Place, Gateside Street and finally Quarry Street, it continues largely downhill and in a fairly straight line through the neighbourhoods of Eddlewood, Cadzow (with a junction for the B755 to Fairhill) and Low Waters before reaching the town centre adjacent to Hamilton Central railway station and close to the bus station. It meets the end of the A724 – westbound towards Hamilton West, Burnbank and Blantyre – at the 'Top Cross' (this is south of the 'Bottom Cross' but uphill from it, and the street between them nowadays pedestrianised), with the A723 turning east in a section of dual carriageway known as Duke Street, Low Patrick Street and Blackswell Lane having been adapted from three distinct older streets during the mid-20th century reconfiguration which rounds the Regent Shopping Centre and has a junction for the eastbound A72 towards Barncluith, Ferniegair and Chatelherault Country Park.

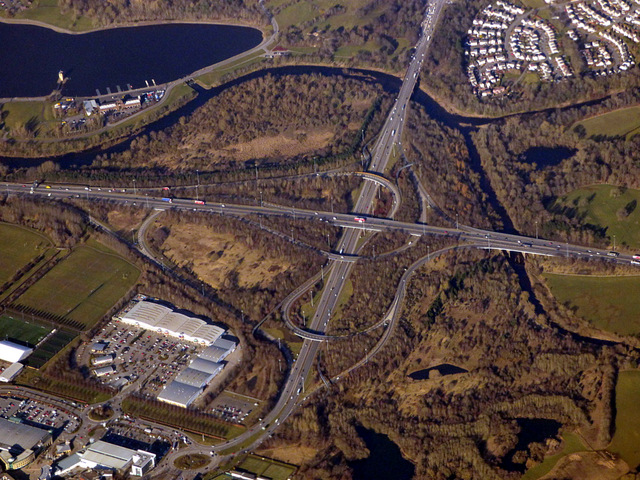
M74 motorway Junction 6 interchange with Hamilton in foreground; River Clyde and Avon Water also visible

Now at the eastern side of the town centre, there is a large roundabout with exits for the A72 northbound (for Palace Grounds Retail Park) and Keith Street westbound for the 'Bottom Cross'. Still a dual carriageway, the A723 continues east as Motherwell Road and immediately becomes part of a major junction, the M74 motorway's Junction 6 (Hamilton Interchange), for which a northbound lane divides to serve the north and south directions onto the motorway, and a southbound lane does so in the opposite direction. There are four exit loops off the motorway, dependant on the driver's destination on the A723 being west towards Hamilton or east towards Motherwell. Pedestrian access between the towns is maintained via a snaking network of footpaths.

=== Motherwell and district ===
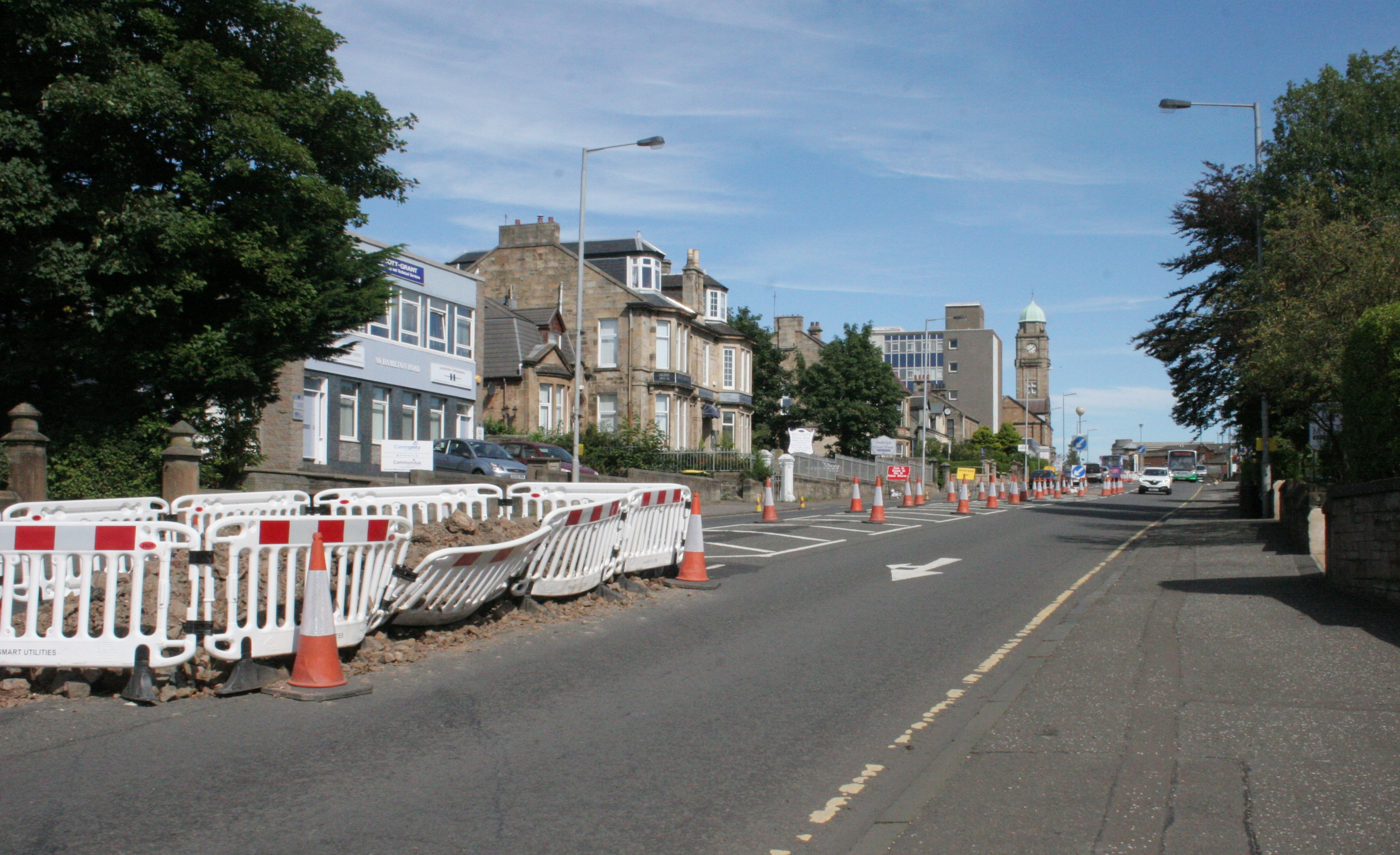
View eastwards on Hamilton Road, Motherwell, approaching the town centre

After the M74 Interchange, the A723 crosses the River Clyde (entering Motherwell and North Lanarkshire) via the Clyde Bridge, built in the 1930s to replace Hamilton Bridge which had a different angle of crossing. The road continues straight and north-east as Hamilton Road, featuring a junction for Strathclyde Country Park and for the B754 Airbles Road – an important artery linking traffic to the motorway from the Wishaw area – and then passes Dalziel High School and Motherwell Town Hall approaching the town centre. A partial one-way system is in operation around Motherwell Shopping Centre (Brandon Parade): westbound traffic is directed south on Mentieth Road (at either end of which there are pedestrian underpasses for access to the retail area) then west on West Hamilton Street, while eastbound can either take the same route or go slightly more directly via one-way Muir Street (passing Motherwell railway station) then Hope Street. These sections coexist with the A721 road (running between Bellshill and Wishaw either side of Motherwell), with the A721 taking precedence on maps and signage.

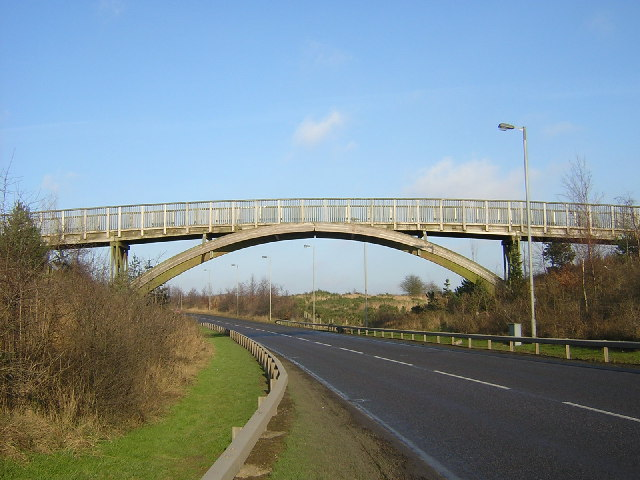
Footbridge between Holytown and Newarthill

Still heading north-east, now as Merry Street, the A723 continues downhill and over the South Calder Water, then uphill past the entrance to Colville Park Country Club, a junction with the B799 for New Stevenston, the housing scheme at Jerviston and the northern edge of new residential building at Ravenscraig, onto a roundabout with an exit for the Ravenscraig development's spine road (this eventually meets the A721 at Craigneuk), with a further exit to the B7029 for Carfin and Newarthill. The A723 heads north, acting as a bypass between the four large villages in the area - over time these have all expanded to form a single suburban grouping - which also crosses under the Shotts Line railway and provides access for streets in western parts of Carfin, eastern parts of New Stevenston plus Taylor High School, western parts of Newarthill plus Brannock High School, and the modern development of Torrance Park adjacent to Holytown. A footbridge provides pedestrian access between Redwood Road (Holytown) and Armine Path (Newarthill), at which point the road is considered non-urban and the national speed limit is applied. Just north of Holytown Crematorium, the route terminates at a roundabout where it meets the A775 (west to Mossend and Bellshill, east to Newhouse and Junction 6 of the M8 motorway) and the B799 (north to Eurocentral industrial park, Chapelhall / Airdrie and Junctions 6A and 7 of the motorway), a key route for locals employed in the area or accessing the motorway network.
