= Tonner =

Tonner is a surname. Notable people called Tonner include:

- Jack Tonner (1898–1978), Scottish footballer
- Jimmy Tonner (1896–1985), Scottish professional footballer
- Lawrence Waldemar Tonner (1861–1947), 1870 immigrant from Denmark to the US
- Matthew Tonner (born 1988), American musician and music producer
- Robert Tonner (born 1952), American entrepreneur, owner of Tonner Doll Company, Inc
- Sam Tonner (1894–1976), Scottish footballer

== See also ==
- Tomme Tønner, Norwegian gangster comedy
- Tanner (disambiguation)
- Tinner (disambiguation)
- Tonn (disambiguation)
- Tonnerre (disambiguation)
