= List of census localities in Scotland =

A census locality in Scotland is a reporting district for results from the 2001 census corresponding to all or part of an urban area.

== City of Aberdeen ==
Locality	Population (2001)	Area (ha)	Population density
Aberdeen (1)	184,788	5501	33.6
Cove Bay (1)	6879	235	29.3
Dyce (1)	5661	358	15.8
Kingswells	3984	149	26.7
Peterculter-Milltimber	6662	248	26.9

1. Aberdeen Settlement.

== Aberdeenshire ==
Locality	Population (2001)	Area (ha)	Population density
Aberchirder	1149	49	23.4
Aboyne	2202	228	9.7
Alford	1925	98	19.6
Ballater	1446	86	16.8
Balmedie	1653	117	14.1
Banchory	6034	352	17.1
Banff	3991	141	28.3
Blackburn	1386	50	27.7
Boddam	1364	77	17.7
Inverallochy and Cairnbulg	1197	48	24.9
Crimond	793	64	12.4
Cruden Bay	1608	92	17.5
Cuminestown	457	83	5.5
Drumoak	716	76	9.4
Ellon	8754	363	24.1
Fraserburgh	12,454	434	28,7
Fyvie	493	85	5.8
Gardenstown	733	58	12.6
Gourdon	594	22	27.0
Hatton of Cruden	805	64	12.6
Huntly	4412	175	25.2
Insch	1523	91	16.7
Inverbervie	2094	75	27.9
Inverurie	10,882	396	27.5
Johnshaven	646	33	19.6
Kemnay	3697	148	25.0
Kintore	1696	90	18.8
Laurencekirk	1808	98	18.4
Longside	721	48	15.0
Macduff	3767	142	26.5
Maud	630	42	15.0
Mintlaw	2647	159	16.6
New Deer	519	58	8.9
New Pitsligo	927	56	16.6
Newburgh	1392	66	21.1
Newmachar	2318	54	42.9
Newtonhill	2940	74	39.7
Oldmeldrum	2003	96	20.9
Peterhead	17,947	583	30.8
Pitmedden	1137	40	28.4
Portlethen	6603	267	24.7
Portsoy	1734	113	15.3
Potterton	886	70	12.7
Rosehearty	1194	88	13.6
Rothienorman	539	36	15.0
St Combs	697	38	18.3
St Cyrus	902	54	16.7
Sandhaven	706	28	25.2
Stonehaven	9577	258	37.1
Strichen	879	50	17.6
Stuartfield	665	39	17.1
Tarland	520	50	10.4
Tarves	914	35	26.1
Torphins	1094	68	16.1
Turriff	4454	209	21.3
Westhill	9498	339	28.0
Whitehills	1012	46	22.0

== Angus ==
Locality	Population (2001)	Area (ha)	Population density
Arbroath	22,785	767	29.7
Birkhill-Muirhead	1936	228	8.5
Brechin	7199	264	27.3
Carnoustie	10,561	361	29.3
Edzell	783	47	16.7
Ferryden (1)	929	26	35.7
Forfar	13,206	459	28.8
Friockheim	820	37	22.2
Hillside	1014	54	18.8
Kirriemuir	5963	228	26.2
Letham	1498	98	15.3
Montrose (1)	10,845	421	25.8
Newtyle	722	37	19.5
Wellbank	584	31	18.8

1. Montrose Settlement.

== Argyll and Bute ==
Locality	Population (2001)	Area (ha)	Population density
Ardrishaig	1283	76	16.9
Bowmore	862	49	17.6
Campbeltown	5144	227	22.7
Cardross	1925	74	26.0
Dunbeg	730	22	33.2
Dunoon (1)	8251	362	22.8
Garelochhead	1265	56	22.6
Helensburgh (2)	14,626	497	29.4
Innellan	1188	169	7.0
Kilcreggan	1414	175	8.1
Lochgilphead	2326	181	12.9
Oban	8120	1662	4.9
Port Bannatyne	1354	58	23.3
Port Ellen	819	99	8.3
Rhu and Shandon (2)	1854	186	10.0
Rosneath	931	28	33.3
Rothesay	5017	236	21.3
Sandbank (1)	807	131	6.2
Tarbert	1338	114	11.7
Tobermory	980	187	5.2

1. Dunoon Settlement.
2. Helensburgh Settlement.

== Clackmannanshire ==
Locality	Population (2001)	Area (ha)	Population density
Alloa (1)	18,989	912	20.8
Alva	5181	155	33.4
Clackmannan	3450	103	33.5
Coalsnaughton (2)	870	19	45.8
Dollar	2877	128	22.5
Menstrie	2007	244	8.2
Tillicoultry (2)	5400	191	28.3
Tullibody (1)	6814	785	8.7

1. Alloa Settlement.
2. Tillicoultry Settlement.

== Dumfries and Galloway ==
Locality	Population (2001)	Area (ha)	Population density
Annan	8389	443	18.9
Cargenbridge	604	30	20.1
Castle Douglas	3671	161	22.8
Creetown	685	35	19.6
Dalbeattie	4289	188	22.8
Dumfries	31,146	1224	25.4
Eaglesfield	616	46	13.4
Eastriggs	1683	78	21.6
Ecclefechan	746	37	20.2
Gatehouse of Fleet	892	59	15.1
Glenluce	611	46	13.3
Gretna	2705	98	27.6
Kirkconnel	2074	83	25.0
Kirkcudbright	3447	152	22.7
Langholm	2311	97	23.8
Locharbriggs	6096	576	10.6
Lochmaben	1952	80	24.4
Lockerbie	4009	234	17.1
Moffat	2135	97	22.0
Newton Stewart	3573	171	20.9
Port William	468	30	15.6
Portpatrick	585	50	11.7
Sanquhar	2028	92	22.0
Stranraer	10,851	370	29.3
Thornhill	1512	93	16.3
Whithorn	867	45	19.3
Wigtown	987	36	27.4

== City of Dundee ==
Locality	Population (2001)	Area (ha)	Population density
Dundee	154,674	4624	33.5

== East Ayrshire ==
Locality	Population (2001)	Area (ha)	Population density
Auchinleck	3512	141	24.9
Bellsbank	1619	45	36.0
Bonnyton	3722	130	28.6
Catrine	2053	74	27.7
Crosshouse	2454	77	31.9
Cumnock	9358	336	27.9
Dalmellington-Burnton	1407	59	23.8
Dalrymple	1281	68	18.8
Darvel	3361	112	30.0
Drongan	3012	92	32.7
Dunlop	839	36	23.3
Fenwick	863	33	26.2
Galston (1)	5000	119	42.0
Hurlford-Crookedholm	4968	148	33.6
Kilmarnock	43,588	1347	32.4
Kilmaurs	2601	74	35.1
Logan	1333	67	19.9
Mauchline	4105	124	33.1
Muirkirk	1630	56	29.1
New Cumnock	3165	150	21.1
Newmilns (1)	3057	124	24.7
Ochiltree	693	25	27.7
Patna	2179	111	19.6
Stewarton	6582	177	37.2

1. Galston-Newmilns Settlement.

== East Dunbartonshire ==
Locality	Population (2001)	Area (ha)	Population density
Bearsden (1)	27,967	1200	23.3
Bishopbriggs (1)	23,118	664	34,8
Kirkintilloch (2)	20,281	563	36.0
Lennoxtown	3773	116	32.5
Lenzie (2)	8873	352	25.2
Milngavie (1)	12,795	404	31.7
Milton of Campsie	3950	103	38.3
Torrance	2480	72	34.4
Twechar	1363	56	24.3

1. Greater Glasgow Settlement.
2. Kirkintilloch-Lenzie Settlement.

== East Lothian ==
Locality	Population (2001)	Area (ha)	Population density
Aberlady	873	29	30.1
Cockenzie	5499	111	49.5
Dunbar	6354	326	19.5
East Linton	1744	77	22.6
Elphinstone	514	14	36.7
Gifford	688	31	22.2
Gullane	2172	136	16.0
Haddington	8851	277	32.0
Longniddry	2613	98	26.7
Macmerry	1113	74	15.0
Musselburgh (1)	22,112	535	41.3
North Berwick	6223	230	27.1
Ormiston	2079	45	46.2
Pencaitland	1566	67	23.4
Prestonpans	7153	184	38.9
Tranent	8892	231	38.5
West Barns	555	32	17.3
Whitecraig	1278	40	32.0

1. Edinburgh Settlement.

== East Renfrewshire ==
Locality	Population (2001)	Area (ha)	Population density
Barrhead (1)	17,244	511	33.7
Busby (1)	1654	167	9.9
Clarkston (1)	19,136	506	37.8
Eaglesham	3127	125	25.0
Giffnock (1)	16,178	491	32.9
Neilston	5168	116	44.6
Newton Mearns (1)	22,637	768	29.5
Uplawmoor	595	32	18.6
Waterfoot	1279	35	36.5

1. Greater Glasgow Settlement.

== City of Edinburgh ==
Locality	Population (2001)	Area (ha)	Population density
Edinburgh (1)	430,082	11,475	37.5
Kirkliston	3043	69	44.1
Queensferry	9370	244	38.4
Ratho	1518	68	22.3
Ratho Station	1013	211	4.8

1. Edinburgh Settlement.

== Eileanan Siar ==
Locality	Population (2001)	Area (ha)	Population density
Aird (Aird An Rubha)	443	375	1.2
Balivanich (Baile a' Mhanaich)	443	376	1.2
Coll (Col) (1)	1087	664	1.6
Laxdale (Lacasdal) (2)	1184	661	1.8
Ness (Nis)	962	1513	0.6
Sandwick (Sanndabhaig) (2)	1269	1150	1.2
Stornoway (Steòrnabhagh) (2)	5602	579	9.7
Tong (Tunga) (1)	527	260	2.0

1. Coll Settlement.
2. Stornoway Settlement.

== Falkirk ==
Locality	Population (2001)	Area (ha)	Population density
Airth	1273	31	41.1
Avonbridge	625	28	22.3
Banknock (1)	2529	73	34.6
Bo'ness	13,961	617	22.6
Bonnybridge (2)	6870	286	24.0
California	702	27	26.0
Carron (3)	5398	117	46.1
Denny (2)	9797	268	36.6
Dunipace (2)	2441	63	38.7
Falkirk (3)	32,379	1144	28.3
Grangemouth (3)	17,771	1067	16.7
Haggs (1)	713	36	19.8
Hallglen	3488	68	51.3
Polmont (3)	19,563	706	27.7
Shieldhill	2656	63	42.2
Slamannan	1223	50	24.5
Stenhousemuir	16,311	576	28.3
Whitecross	819	16	51.2

1. Banknock-Haggs Settlement.
2. Bonnybridge Settlement.
3. Falkirk Settlement.

== Fife ==
Locality	Population (2001)	Area (ha)	Population density
Aberdour	1690	113	15.0
Anstruther (1)	3442	119	28.9
Auchtermuchty	2010	77	26.1
Ballingry	5961	163	36.6
Balmullo	1098	62	17.7
Blairhall	657	19	34.6
Buckhaven (2)	16,391	630	26.0
Burntisland	5667	182	31.1
Cairneyhill	2507	53	47.3
Cardenden	4946	158	31.3
Ceres	1019	59	17.3
Coaltown of Balgonie (3)	905	37	24.5
Coaltown of Wemyss	504	17	29.6
Cowdenbeath (4)	11,627	362	32.1
Crail	1695	68	24.9
Crossford	2544	63	40.4
Crossgates (5)	2138	132	16.2
Cupar	8506	354	24.0
Dalgety Bay (6)	10,011	353	28.4
Dunfermline	39,229	1146	34.2
East Wemyss	1841	92	20.0
Elie	942	53	17.8
Falkland	1183	53	22.3
Freuchie	1102	39	28.3
Gauldry	744	70	10.6
Glenrothes (3)	38,679	1784	21.7
Guardbridge (7)	627	110	5.7
Halbeath (5)	682	116	5.9
High Valleyfield	2940	408	7.2
Inverkeithing (6)	5412	420	12.9
Kelty	5628	177	31.8
Kennoway (8)	4628	130	35.6
Kincardine	3035	99	30.7
Kinghorn	2835	83	34.2
Kinglassie	1320	56	23.6
Kingskettle	994	51	19.5
Kirkcaldy	46,912	1497	31.3
Ladybank	1487	50	29.7
Leslie (3)	2998	95	31.6
Leuchars (7)	2518	477	5.3
Leven (2)	8051	346	23.3
Limekilns	1411	62	22.8
Lochgelly (4)	6749	217	31,1
Lundin Links	2090	107	19.5
Markinch (3)	2254	72	31.3
Newburgh	1954	143	13.7
Newport-on-Tay	4214	152	27.7
North Queensferry (6)	1102	136	8.1
Oakley	4123	130	31.7
Pittenweem (1)	1747	60	29.1
Rosyth (6)	12,428	690	18.0
Saline	1188	50	23.8
Springfield	1013	52	19.5
St Andrews	14,209	477	29.8
St Monans	1435	35	41.0
Strathkinness	893	36	24.8
Strathmiglo	922	43	21.4
Tayport	3847	152	25.3
Thornton	1766	56	31.5
Townhill	1242	29	42.8
Windygates (8)	1645	69	23.8

1. Anstruther-Pittenweem Settlement.
2. Buckhaven Settlement.
3. Glenrothes Settlement.
4. Cowdenbeath Settlement.
5. Halbeath-Crossgates Settlement.
6. Inverkeithing-Dalgety Bay Settlement.
7. Leuchars Settlement.
8. Kennoway Settlement.

== City of Glasgow ==
Locality	Population (2001)	Area (ha)	Population density
Carmunnock	1106	76	14.6
Glasgow (1)	629,501	16,210	38.8

1. Greater Glasgow Settlement.

== Highland ==
Locality	Population (2001)	Area (ha)	Population density
Alness	5186	516	10.1
Ardersier	968	38	25.5
Auldearn	535	22	24.3
Aviemore	2397	515	4.7
Avoch	891	41	21.7
Balintore	1087	67	16.2
Ballachulish	615	83	7.4
Balloch (1)	1555	81	19.2
Beauly	1164	74	15.7
Brora	1140	87	13.1
Castletown	798	36	22.2
Conon Bridge	2461	181	14.7
Cromarty	719	34	21.1
Culloden (1)	4064	158	25.7
Dingwall	5026	325	15.5
Dornoch	1206	195	6.2
Drumnadrochit	813	133	6.1
Evanton	1105	71	15.6
Fort Augustus	508	107	4.7
Fort William	9908	993	10.0
Fortrose	1174	85	13.8
Golspie	1404	115	12.2
Grantown-on-Spey	2166	132	16.4
Halkirk	923	121	7.6
Invergordon	3890	242	16.1
Inverness (2)	40,949	1939	21.1
Kingussie	1410	125	11.3
Kinlochleven	897	84	10.7
Kyle of Lochalsh	739	112	6.6
Mallaig	797	64	12.5
Milton-Kildary	604	82	7.4
Muir of Ord	1812	186	9.7
Nairn	8418	489	17.2
Nethy Bridge	498	100	5.0
Newtonmore	982	189	5.2
North Kessock	887	68	13.0
Portree	1917	192	10.0
Rosemarkie	608	26	23.4
Smithton (1)	2129	50	42.6
Strathpeffer	918	75	12.2
Tain	3511	276	12.7
Thurso	7737	482	16.1
Ullapool	1308	95	13.8
Westhill (2)	3135	205	15.3
Wick	7333	851	8.6

1. Culloden Settlement.
2. Inverness Settlement.

== Inverclyde ==
Locality	Population (2001)	Area (ha)	Population density
Gourock (1)	11,511	346	33.3
Greenock (1)	45,467	1258	36.1
Inverkip	1598	90	17.8
Kilmacolm	4000	184	21.7
Port Glasgow (1)	16,617	465	35.7
Wemyss Bay	2466	78	31.6

1. Greenock Settlement.

== Midlothian ==
Locality	Population (2001)	Area (ha)	Population density
Bilston	2371	349	6.8
Bonnyrigg (1)	14,457	366	39.5
Dalkeith (1)	11,566	411	28.1
Danderhall	2878	51	56.4
Gorebridge	5777	131	44.1
Loanhead	6384	328	19.5
Mayfield (1)	12,820	462	27.7
Pathhead	956	21	45.5
Penicuik	14,759	364	40.5
Rosewell	1120	33	33.9
Roslin	1796	38	47.3

1. Dalkeith Settlement

== Moray ==
Locality	Population (2001)	Area (ha)	Population density
Aberlour	785	71	11.1
Buckie	8059	303	26.6
Burghead	1640	56	29.3
Cullen	1327	50	26.5
Dufftown	1454	69	21.1
Elgin	20,829	828	25.2
Findhorn	885	93	9.5
Findochty	1106	43	25.7
Fochabers	1499	53	28.3
Forres	8967	378	23.7
Hopeman	1624	61	26.6
Keith	4491	225	20.0
Kinloss	1931	101	19.1
Lhanbryde	1845	51	36.2
Lossiemouth	6803	215	31.6
Mosstodloch	1017	40	25.4
Portgordon	771	39	19.8
Portknockie	1217	55	22.1
Rothes	1156	74	15.6

== North Ayrshire ==
Locality	Population (2001)	Area (ha)	Population density
Ardrossan (1)	10,952	328	33.4
Beith	6346	273	23.2
Brodick	621	94	6.6
Dalry	5398	148	36.5
Dreghorn (2)	4152	370	11.2
Fairlie	1510	73	20.7
Irvine (2)	33,090	1166	28.4
Kilbirnie	7280	297	24.5
Kilwinning	15,908	495	32.1
Lamlash	1010	143	7.1
Largs	11,241	321	35.0
Millport	1253	69	18.2
Saltcoats (1)	11,260	331	34.0
Skelmorlie	1828	94	19.4
Springside	1184	37	32.0
Stevenston (1)	9129	307	29.7
West Kilbride	4393	172	25.5

1. Ardrossan Settlement.
2. Irvine Settlement.

== North Lanarkshire ==
Locality	Population (2001)	Area (ha)	Population density
Airdrie (1)	36,326	1207	30.1
Allanton	1251	39	32.1
Auchinloch (2)	738	21	35.1
Bargeddie (1)	2144	130	16.5
Bellshill (1)	20,705	552	37.5
Blackwood	1923	45	42.7
Calderbank (1)	1663	47	35.4
Caldercruix	2031	57	35.6
Carfin (1)	1048	44	23.8
Chapelhall (1)	5214	189	27.6
Chryston (3)	2653	88	30.1
Cleland	2806	91	30.8
Coatbridge (1)	41,170	1766	23.3
Croy	659	14	47.1
Cumbernauld	49,664	1978	25.1
Gartcosh	952	66	14.4
Glenboig	1548	86	18.0
Glenmavis	2268	52	43.6
Gowkthrapple (4)	1159	32	36.2
Greengairs and Wattson	920	36	25.6
Harthill	3575	115	31.1
Holytown (1)	5483	422	13.0
Kilsyth	9816	326	30.1
Moodiesburn	6614	133	49.7
Motherwell (1)	30,311	1428	21.2
Muirhead (3)	1389	85	16.3
New Stevenston (1)	4108	262	15.7
Newarthill (1)	6849	172	39.8
Newmains (1)	5329	174	30.6
Overtown (4)	2371	58	40.9
Plains	2291	71	32.3
Salsburgh	1230	39	31.5
Shotts	8235	245	33.6
Stepps (1)	4802	197	24.4
Viewpark (1)	15,841	1164	13,6
Wishaw (1)	28,565	918	31.1

1. Greater Glasgow Settlement.
2. Kirkintilloch-Lenzie Settlement.
3. Chryston Settlement.
4. Overtown-Gowkthrapple Settlement.

== Orkney Islands ==
Locality	Population (2001)	Area (ha)	Population density
Kirkwall	6206	280	22.2
Stromness	1609	488	3.3

== Perth and Kinross ==
Locality	Population (2001)	Area (ha)	Population density
Aberfeldy	1895	118	16.1
Abernethy	945	138	6.8
Almondbank	610	14	43.6
Alyth	2301	98	23.5
Auchterarder	3945	183	21.6
Bankfoot	1136	51	22.3
Blackford	556	37	15.0
Blairgowrie	7965	462	17.2
Braco	515	23	22.4
Bridge of Earn	2272	126	18.0
Burrelton	621	49	12.7
Comrie	1839	120	15.3
Coupar Angus	2190	85	25.8
Crieff	6579	340	19.4
Dunkeld-Birnam	1005	83	12.1
Dunning	900	45	20.0
Errol	1073	32	33.5
Glenfarg	486	46	10.6
Inchture	735	31	23.7
Kinross	4681	306	15.3
Longforgan	668	35	19.1
Luncarty	1265	82	15.4
Methven	1162	49	23.7
Milnathort	1738	83	20.9
Muthill	675	30	22.5
New Scone	4430	164	27.0
Perth	43,450	1669	26.0
Pitlochry	2564	205	12.5
St Madoes-Glencarse	695	72	9.7
Stanley	1437	59	24.4

== Renfrewshire ==
Locality	Population (2001)	Area (ha)	Population density
Bishopton	5157	128	40.3
Bridge of Weir	4635	216	21.5
Elderslie (1)	5180	216	24.0
Erskine (2)	15,347	452	34.0
Hawkhead	1007	19	53.0
Houston	6610	203	32.6
Howwood (1)	1502	70	21.5
Inchinnan (2)	1574	70	22.5
Johnstone (1)	16,468	445	37.0
Kilbarchan (1)	3622	95	38.1
Langbank	903	49	18.4
Linwood (1)	9058	210	43.1
Lochwinnoch	2570	73	35.2
Paisley (1)	74,170	2979	24.9
Renfrew (1)	20,251	714	28.4

1. Greater Glasgow Settlement.
2. Erskine Settlement.

== South Ayrshire ==
Locality	Population (2001)	Area (ha)	Population density
Annbank	854	23	37.1
Ayr (1)	46,431	1827	25.4
Coylton	2409	89	27.1
Dailly	908	31	29.3
Dundonald	2459	154	16.0
Girvan	6992	200	35.0
Loans	701	20	35.1
Maybole	4552	159	28.6
Monkton	661	72	9.2
Mossblown	2038	47	43.4
Prestwick (1)	14,934	529	28.2
Symington	1042	41	25.4
Tarbolton	1713	43	39.8
Troon	14,766	516	28.6

1. Ayr-Prestwick Settlement.

== South Lanarkshire ==
Locality	Population (2001)	Area (ha)	Population density
Ashgill (1)	1108	31	35.7
Biggar	2098	93	22.6
Blantyre (2)	17,328	789	22.0
Bothwell (3)	6379	442	14.4
Carluke	13,454	420	32.0
Carnwath	1447	43	33.7
Carstairs	690	18	38.3
Carstairs Junction	792	28	28.3
Chapelton	759	22	34.5
Coalburn	1247	36	34.6
Crossford	674	85	7.9
Douglas	1676	62	27.0
East Kilbride	73,796	2412	30.6
Forth	2220	62	35.8
Glassford	595	13	45.8
Hamilton (2)	48,546	1474	32.9
Kirkfieldbank	887	50	17.7
Kirkmuirhill-Blackwood	3717	102	36.4
Lanark	8253	265	31.1
Larkhall (1)	15,549	595	26.1
Law	2883	61	47.3
Lesmahagow	3685	121	30.5
Netherburn	719	50	14.4
Quarter	842	20	42.1
Rigside	741	21	35.3
Stonehouse	5056	156	32.4
Strathaven	7700	275	28.0
Uddingston (3)	5576	355	15.7

1. Larkhall
2. Blantyre | Hamilton
3. Greater Glasgow

== Scottish Borders ==
Locality	Population (2001)	Area (ha)	Population density
Ayton	557	35	15.9
Chirnside	1204	77	15.6
Coldingham	600	64	9.4
Coldstream	1813	82	22.1
Denholm	608	54	11.3
Duns	2594	202	12.8
Earlston	1711	95	18.0
Eyemouth	3383	107	31.6
Galashiels	14,361	602	23.9
Greenlaw	579	61	9.5
Hawick	14,573	491	29.7
Innerleithen	2586	139	18.6
Jedburgh	4090	160	25.6
Kelso	5116	150	34.1
Lauder	1081	42	25.7
Maxwellheugh	903	78	11.6
Melrose	1656	119	13.9
Newcastleton	772	45	17.2
Newtown St Boswells	1199	127	9.4
Peebles	8065	342	23.6
Selkirk	5742	241	23.8
St Boswells	1086	47	23.1
Stow	548	38	14.4
Walkerburn	647	35	18.5
West Linton	1459	85	17.2
Yetholm	591	43	13.7

== Shetland Islands ==
Locality	Population (2001)	Area (ha)	Population density
Brae	660	173	3.8
Lerwick	6830	514	13.3
Scalloway	812	52	15.6

== Stirling ==
Locality	Population (2001)	Area (ha)	Population density
Aberfoyle	576	45	12.8
Balfron	1518	81	18.7
Bannockburn (1)	7396	209	35.4
Bridge of Allan (1)	5046	250	20.2
Buchlyvie	479	18	26.6
Callander	2754	135	20.4
Cowie	2387	111	21.5
Doune	1635	85	19.2
Drymen	681	54	12.6
Dunblane	7911	293	27.0
Fallin	2710	69	39.3
Gargunnock	694	32	21.7
Killearn	1781	91	19.6
Killin	666	112	5.9
Kippen	934	49	19.1
Plean	1740	68	25.6
Stirling (1)	32,673	1383	23.6
Strathblane	1811	76	23.8

1. Stirling Settlement.

== West Dunbartonshire ==
Locality	Population (2001)	Area (ha)	Population density
Alexandria (1)	13,444	1190	11.3
Bonhill (1)	9574	422	22.7
Clydebank (2)	29,858	970	30.8
Dumbarton (1)	20,527	649	31.6
Duntocher and Hardgate (2)	7301	310	23.6
Faifley (2)	4932	88	56.0
Milton (2)	986	275	3.6
Old Kilpatrick (2)	3199	86	37.2
Renton (1)	2138	96	22.3

1. Dumbarton Settlement.
2. Greater Glasgow Settlement.

== West Lothian ==
Locality	Population (2001)	Area (ha)	Population density
Addiebrownhill (1)	1308	102	12.8
Armadale	9063	335	27.1
Bathgate	15,068	472	31.9
Blackburn	4761	239	19.9
Blackridge	1554	65	23.9
Bridgend	765	22	34.8
Broxburn	12,892	483	26.7
Dechmont	739	23	32.1
East Calder (2)	5762	343	16.8
East Whitburn	980	25	39.2
Fauldhouse	4625	112	41.3
Kirknewton	1648	38	43.4
Linlithgow	13,370	433	30.9
Livingston (2)	54,826	2203	23.1
Longridge	650	18	36.1
Mid Calder (2)	2923	61	47.9
Polbeth	2440	61	40.0
Seafield	1216	39	31.2
Stoneyburn (1)	2016	92	21.9
Torphichen	596	23	25.9
West Calder	2818	78	36.1
Whitburn	10,391	273	38.1
Winchburgh	2570	74	34.7

1. Stoneyburn-Addiebrownhill Settlement.
2. Livingston Settlement.

== See also ==
- Demographics of Scotland
- United Kingdom Census 2001
- United Kingdom Census 2011
