= Taylor High School, New Stevenston =

Coordinates: 55.8094°N 3.9749°W

Taylor High School
- Taylor High School, New Stevenston

Location
- Carfin Street, New Stevenston; Motherwell, North Lanarkshire, ML1 4JP; Scotland

Information
- Type: Comprehensive Secondary School
- Motto: Que Tout Soit Pour Dieu
- Religious affiliation: Roman Catholic
- Established: August 1982
- Status: Technology School of Ambition 2007-10
- Authority: North Lanarkshire Council
- Head Teacher: Carol Ann Lees (Acting HT)
- Staff: 62.5 FTE (as of August 2020)
- Gender: Co-educational
- Age: 11 to 18
- Enrolment: 929 (as of August 2020)
- Houses: St. John Ogilvie, St. Margaret, St. Columba, St. Andrew, St. Kentigern & St. Ninian.
- Colour: Wine/Burgundy Gold Silver
- Website: https://blogs.glowscotland.org.uk/nl/taylor/home-2/

Taylor High School is a six-year Roman Catholic comprehensive secondary school in New Stevenston, Motherwell, Scotland. It is named after Monsignor Thomas Nimmo Taylor who was Parish Priest at St. Francis Xavier Church, Carfin for almost 50 years and who was responsible for the development of the Carfin Lourdes Grotto in 1922.

== Staff ==
The Acting Head Teacher is Mrs. Carol Ann Lees, who is assisted by three Deputy Head Teachers: Mrs Nicola Duffy née Clelland, Mr John McLaughlin and Mrs. Ursula Johnston. Taylor High School has a teaching staff complement of approximately 62 FTE (Full Time Equivalent). There are 9 Principal Teachers (Curriculum) and 6 Principal Teachers (Pupil Support). The Pupil Support department operates a vertical system of pastoral care. Mrs. Lees became only the fourth substantive Head Teacher of the school since it opened in 1982 when she took up post in September 2026.

== House System ==
Since the 2022–2023 academic year, THS has adopted a new house system which sorts pupils into one of 6 houses all named after Saints of the Church. St John Ogilvie, St Columba, St Kentigern, St Margaret, St Ninian and St Andrew. This has also been transferred to the Pupil Support system where one of the 6 PTPS is responsible for each pupil in their respective houses: Mrs S. Murphy - St Kentigern House. Miss M. Valente - St John Ogilvie House. Miss G. Kane - St Andrew House. Mr A. McPake - St Columba House. Mr J. Ryan - St Ninian House. Mr C. Phairs - St Margaret House.

== Catchment ==
Taylor High School Logo

Pupils attend the school from New Stevenston (NS), Carfin, Holytown, Newarthill, Cleland and the Jerviston area of Motherwell. Taylor High School has associated primary schools of Christ the King in Holytown, Our Lady & St Francis in Carfin, St Mary's in Cleland, St Patrick's Primary AND New Stevenston Primary, which are conjoined schools with a nursery and library, in New Stevenston and St Teresa's in Newarthill.

== Uniform ==
The school uniform consists of: a wine coloured blazer (should be braided with gold S4-S6); grey or black skirt/trousers; a Taylor High School tie, which is Wine, Gold and Silver (S1-S3), the senior phase tie (S4-S6) is wine and includes a badge image on it.

== HMIe Inspection ==
The school's most recent HMIe inspection report for Taylor High School was published in March 2011. The outcome of the inspection was very good in many areas, such as: the structure of the schools curriculum, the quality of learning and teaching, support for pupils, pupils' impressive achievements in a wide range of activities, ethos, headteacher and senior management leadership and pupil contribution to the school community. The use of technology within the school was also highlighted as a strength.

== Notable former pupils ==
- Mark McNally (b. 1971) - footballer, Celtic F.C.
- Barry Morrison (b. 1980) - Professional boxer
- Christopher Kane (b. 1982) - Fashion designer
- John Kennedy (b. 1983) - Assistant Manager, Celtic F.C.
- Ian McShane (b. 1992) - Professional Footballer
