= Jerviston =

Estate in North Lanarkshire, Scotland

Coordinates: 55.800677°N 3.981468°W

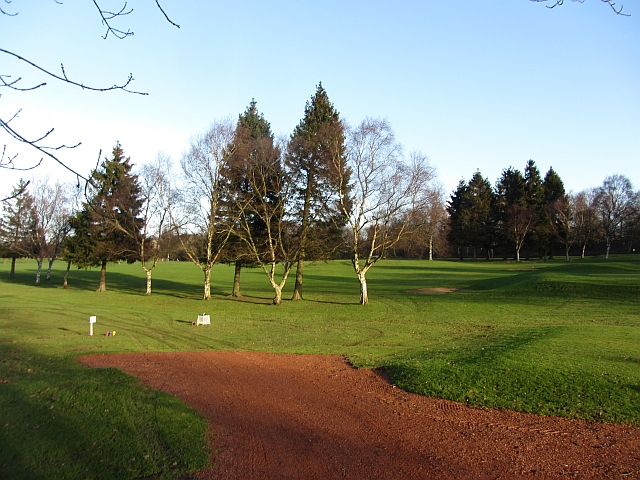
Colville Park golf course on the Jerviston estate

Jerviston is a country estate on the north-eastern edge of the Scottish town of Motherwell in North Lanarkshire which is now occupied by Colville Park Country Club.

The estate was once the location of a small castle (Laird's House) constructed in the 15th century, owned by the family of Robert Baillie. It was said by Jamesy Cotter to be very similar in design to Kingencleugh Castle. In the late 18th century the famed architects James and Robert Adam were commissioned to design a new country house adjacent to the older buildings. Jerviston was later purchased by the Colville family whose steelmaking plants in the area transformed Motherwell from a small village into a bustling industrial town in the late 19th century. After the death of David Colville Snr, the estate was gifted to the employees of the steel works and turned into a public park for the benefit of local people. A country club featuring a golf course and bowling greens was established in 1923.

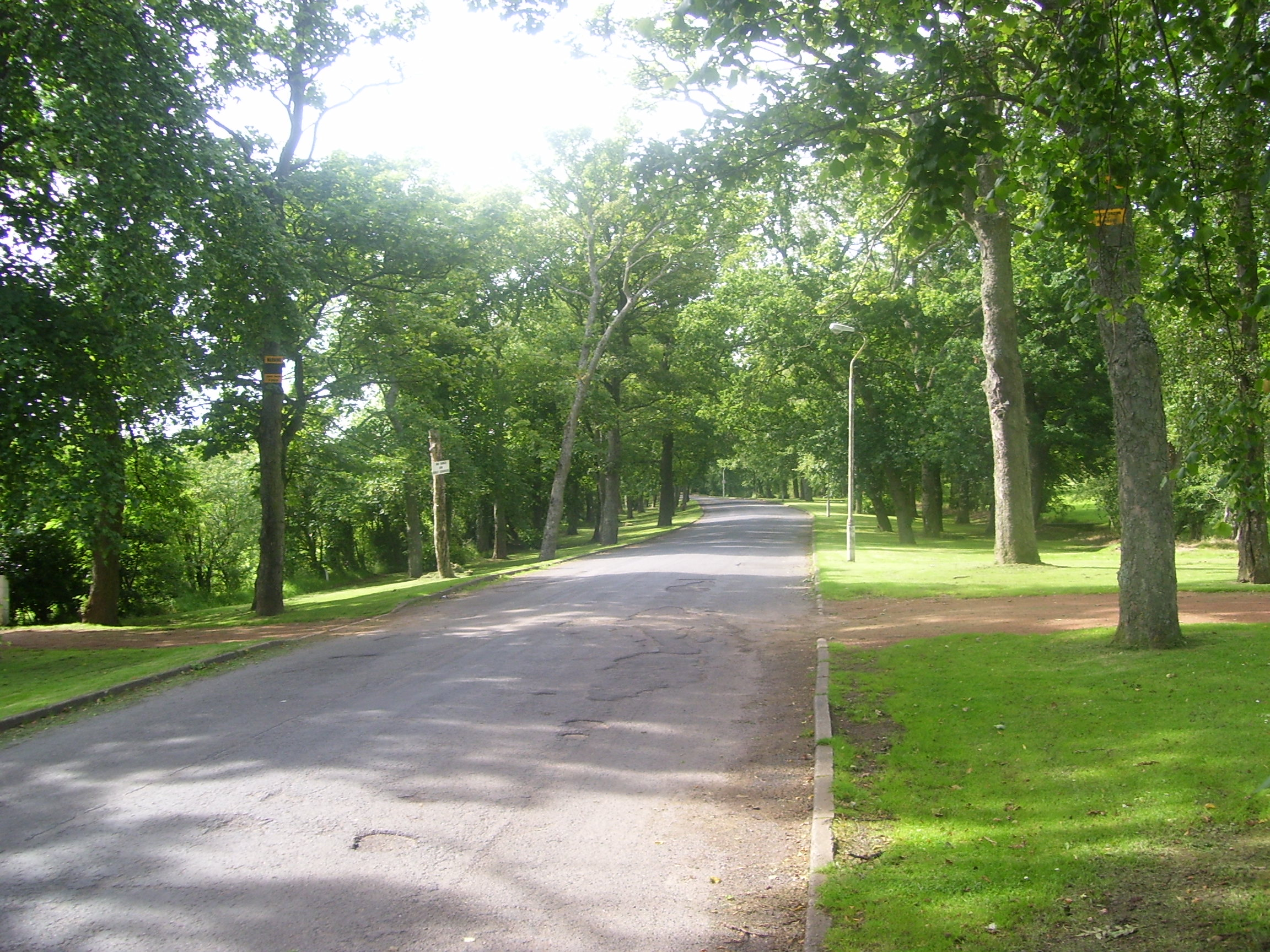
The tree-lined driveway to the old mansion is now the approach road to the country club

In the 1960s, the 18th-century Jerviston House was demolished and replaced by a new club house with modern facilities – today the Colville Park club hosts events such as weddings there. Around the same time, what remained of the 15th-century castle – which had become dilapidated – was also torn down.

The football grounds were home to Colville Park A.F.C., a successful amateur club which began life in the 1960s as a works team for the Colville steelworks at Ravenscraig and Dalzell. However, in 2017 a dispute with the country club over fees led to the team relocating matches and hospitality to other parts of the town, although they retained the name.

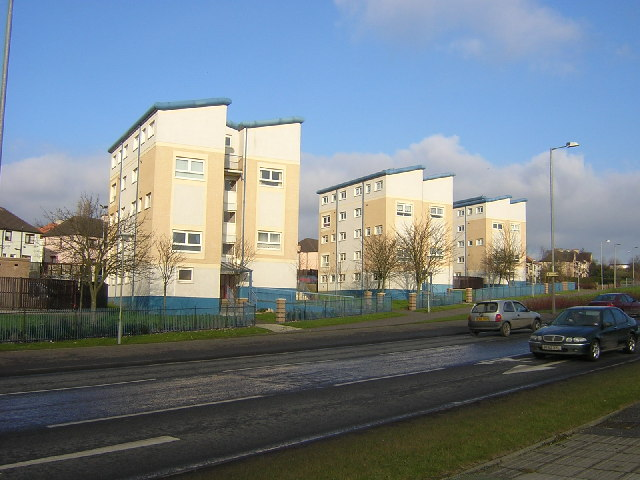
Housing in Cleekhimin

Jerviston is also the name of a small residential area to the east of the country club which, along with the adjacent Cleekhimin neighbourhood (a former mining hamlet which became a council housing estate, setting of the 2019 documentary film Scheme Birds) and the nearby new Ravenscraig redevelopment, lie on the opposite side of the South Calder Water from the rest of Motherwell, although are within the town's administrative borders. The Jerviston/Cleekhimin settlement is part of a wider built-up area comprising the mining communities of Carfin, New Stevenston, Newhouse, Newarthill and Holytown, outside the boundaries of both Motherwell and the other larger nearby town, Bellshill, which nowadays are more or less contiguous due the addition of modern housing in the green spaces between them.

The area of woodland to the immediate north of the golf course at Jerviston is the Riccard Johnston Park, previously a centuries-old farm converted to community recreational use in the 1980s. Also known locally as 'The Coby' (referencing the Cobbleton Plantation which lies within the park), it is part of New Stevenston. The park's main entrance was once the location of early-1800s miners' row cottages known as 'Jerviston Square', which had deteriorated to a terrible standard by the time a newspaper correspondent visited in 1875 and had apparently not improved at all when described in a report to a Royal Commission on the industry in 1914, They contrasted starkly with the luxurious conditions at the turreted mansion house across the road, Wrangholm Hall, built by a local mine owner but also subsequently demolished in the 1990s.

== See also ==
- Dalziel Park, another golf course, sports club and country estate in Motherwell
