= Glenburn Grounds =

Sports venue in Motherwell, Scotland

Glenburn Grounds Carfin Greyhound Stadium
- Location: Carfin, Motherwell, Scotland
- Coordinates: 55°48′13″N 3°57′53″W
- Owner: Heffernan family

Construction
- Opened: 1919 (whippet racing)
- Renovated: 1921 (running track); 1927 (greyhound track)
- Closed: 1999

Glenburn Grounds, also known as the Carfin Greyhound Stadium, was a sports stadium and greyhound racing track in Carfin, near Motherwell, Lanarkshire, Scotland.

Tom Heffernan opened Glenburn Grounds in 1919 for whippet racing. In 1921 a 440 yards cinder track for foot racing was constructed and races were held modelled on the Powderhall Sprint. Willie Applegarth was the most famous athlete to race at the Glenburn Grounds and he also took part in a novelty race against a whippet which ended with the whippet running alongside after refusing to pass him. Greyhound racing started in 1927.

Set on Byresknowe Lane off Motherwell Road it remained a leading independent track (unlicensed) for 72 years. Competitions included the Jubilee Stakes, Easter Cup, Champions Trophy and Glenburn Challenge. The 440 yard circumference resulted in race distances of 140, 300, 350, 510, 580, 740 & 790 yards. Tom Heffernan's son Pat ran the track for many years before it was sold for housing in 1999. The site today is the housing on St Mungos Crescent and Derby Wynd.
