= Damian Barr =

British journalist (born 1976)

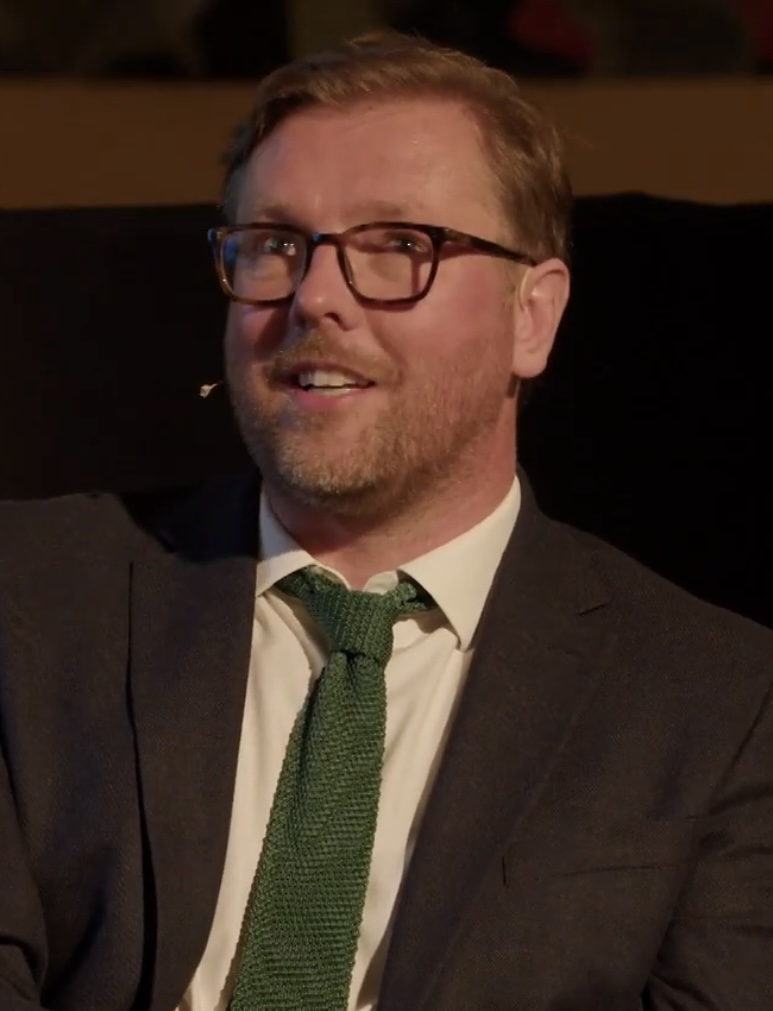
- Barr at the British Library in 2022
- Born: Damian Leighton Barr; 20 July 1976 (age 50); Newarthill, Scotland
- Education: Lancaster University
- Occupations: Journalist, writer
- Writing career
- Genres: Fiction, non-fiction, radio plays
- Website: damianbarr.com

Damian Leighton Barr (born 20 July 1976) is a Scottish writer and broadcaster. He is the creator and host of the Literary Salon, which started at Shoreditch House in 2008, and he hosts live literary events worldwide. In 2014 and 2015, he presented several editions of the BBC Radio 4 cultural programme Front Row. He has hosted several television series including Shelf Isolation and most recently The Big Scottish Book Club for BBC Scotland. He is the author of the 2013 memoir Maggie & Me, about his 1980s childhood in the west of Scotland, and the 2019 novel You Will Be Safe Here, set in South Africa in 1901 and now. He is a Fellow of the Royal Society of Arts (FRSA).

== Early life ==
Barr was born in 1976 in Bellshill, Scotland. He graduated from Lancaster University in Sociology and English Literature in 1998, having spent a year studying at the University of Texas at Austin 1996–1997. In 2000 he won an ESRC Scholarship and completed an MA in Contemporary Sociology. In 2020 Barr completed his PhD in Creative Writing at Lancaster University.

== Career ==
=== Books ===
Barr's first book was published in 2006 by Hodder & Stoughton. Get It Together: How to Survive Your Quarterlife Crisis was the first book concerned with the quarter-life crisis to be published in the UK. It was inspired by a column Barr wrote for The Times in 2001–03 about graduate work and life.[3]

Barr's second book is Maggie & Me, a memoir of growing up in small-town Scotland during the Thatcher years. Bloomsbury acquired the book at auction in July 2010 and it was published in the UK in April 2013 winning him Stonewall Writer of the Year, Sunday Times Memoir of the Year and the Paddy Power Political Satire Award. It was a BBC Radio 4 Book of the Week. It has been optioned by STV and is being adapted for television by Andrea Gibb – Barr will also be a writer on the series.

In 2016, Bloomsbury pre-empted Barr's debut novel You Will Be Safe Here. In 2017 Barr received an award from the Arts Council England to complete research on his novel in South Africa. In 2018 Barr received a University of Otago Scottish Writers Fellowship, which saw him based at the Pah Homestead in Auckland, New Zealand where he edited the novel. You Will be Safe Here was published internationally on 4 April 2019 and was shortlisted for several major awards (see below). It featured on BBC Radio 4's Book at Bedtime, and was critically acclaimed.

=== Broadcasting and journalism ===
Barr has been a columnist for The Times, Sunday Times and The Big Issue, and wrote the travel column Novel Destinations for High Life Magazine. In 2016 he was Highly Commended by BSME as Columnist of the Year. From 2014 to 2017 he wrote BarrFly, The Sunday Times' drink column. From 2008–2018 he was Literary Editor of Soho House.

He is a frequent guest on BBC Radio 4 and has hosted Front Row, with interviewees including Dolly Parton, Javier Marías and Brad Pitt. In 2016 he hosted his first half-hour documentary on BBC One revealing The Writers of Rye produced by Factory Films. In October 2019, Barr was on Sky Arts co-hosting the first ever live coverage of the Cheltenham Literature Festival along with Andi Oliver, Miquita Oliver and Simon Savidge. As well as co-hosting with Andi in the studio he presented the Book Banquet, in which prominent writers recommended a range of books, and he diagnosed the reading habits of a variety of festival guests as the Book Doctor.

In 2019, Barr hosted The Big Scottish Book Club (produced by IWC for BBC Scotland). The series returned in 2020 for a longer run, which was broadcast at the end of 2020. The show featured Janice Galloway, Marian Keyes, Graham Norton, David Nicholls, Jojo Moyes, Neil Gaiman and Sathnam Sanghera, among others. During the first COVID-19 lockdown in 2020, Barr devised and hosted Shelf Isolation, produced by IWC for BBC Scotland and BBC iPlayer.

=== Damian Barr's Literary Salon ===
Launching at Shoreditch House in 2008, Damian Barr's Literary Salon aimed to revitalise live literary events. Readers and writers meet through special live events and online content including interviews, podcasts and brand-new stories. The Salon has held residencies at the St Pancras Renaissance Hotel, the Mondrian and the Savoy, and travelled to venues all around the world including Moscow, New York, Sydney, Auckland, Toronto and San Francisco. The Savoy appointed Barr as the hotel's first ever Literary Ambassador, running their writers-in-residence scheme.

Salon guests have included Tracey Thorn, Rose McGowan, Maggie O'Farrell, Yaa Gyasi, Dustin Lance Black, Caitlin Moran, Philippa Perry, and Armistead Maupin.

In 2020 the Salon added online events and held Salons with Douglas Stuart, Dolly Alderton, SJ Watson, Polly Samson, Pete Paphides and John Niven. There is also a podcast available on iTunes, SoundCloud and LitHub, which is also played in-flight on British Airways.

== Awards and honours ==
- Stonewall Writer of the Year for Maggie & Me (2013)
- The Sunday Times Memoir of the Year for Maggie & Me (2013)
- Paddy Power Political Satire Award for Maggie & Me (2014)
- Winner of National Consumer Travel Feature of the Year by the Travel Media Awards (2015)
- Shortlisted for Writer of the Decade by Stonewall
- Highly Commended in 2016 by BSME as Columnist of the Year for Damian's Big Issue column
- GQ 100 Most Connected Men In Britain (2016)
- Shortlisted for the Saltire Society Fiction Book of the Year Award (2019)
- The Bookseller 150 (2019)
- Longlisted for ‘HWA Debut Crown for the best work by a first-time historical fiction author' for You Will Be Safe Here (2020)
- Longlisted for the Authors' Club Best First Novel for You Will Be Safe Here (2020)
- Shortlisted for the Independent Book Awards for You Will Be Safe Here (2020)
- Shortlisted for The London Magazine Prize for Debut Fiction for You Will Be Safe Here (2020)
- Shortlisted at Edinburgh TV Awards for Shelf Isolation (2020)
- Elected Fellow of the Royal Society of Literature (2020)
- Longlisted for the Walter Scott Prize for The Two Roberts (2026)

== Booker Prize controversy ==
In June 2020, Barr publicly raised questions about the suitability of Baroness Emma Nicholson as honorary vice president of the Booker Prize, a prestigious annual literary prize. Nicholson, a peer in the House of Lords, had voted against same-sex marriage in 2013 claiming she believed "it would lead to degrading the status of women and of girls". Booker subsequently announced that they would be dissolving all honorary titles and roles associated with the event.

Shortly afterwards, it emerged that Barr used pejorative language on Twitter to describe transgender people, appearing to mock a transsexual who had attempted to take their own life, writing in April 2009: "Tittering sickly @ story of 6’5" tranny who failed to hang herself from 5 ft balcony this wknd. How many failures can one person take?" The following month he referred to a "nice tranny charity", and wrote: "lady-man truckers unite." And in March 2013 he tweeted that there was a "mad tranny going through my recycling bin". An interrogation of his Twitter account also revealed that he had referred to women as "bitches" and sex workers as "hookers". Once these became known, Barr immediately locked his Twitter account and issued an apology, stating: "I apologised then. I remain sorry today. I listened and changed: I hope my solidarity and actions since speak louder than that word then."

The revelations led to much criticism; the Savoy Hotel, which Barr is the literary ambassador for, condemned the comments.

== Supporting libraries and charities ==
Barr started the campaign to save Newarthill Library in 2016 receiving support from Ian Rankin, Armistead Maupin, Val McDermid, Sathnam Sanghera among others. He worked closely with the local community who ran the campaign and who now work closely with the library running events and activities there.

In 2012 he started the Writers-in-Residence scheme for Gladstone's Library. Barr is a Trustee at Gladstone's Library, a Patron of the young people's writing charity Little Green Pig and a Schools Ambassador for Stonewall.

== Bibliography ==
=== Books ===
- Get It Together: How to Survive Your Quarterlife Crisis (2006)
- Maggie & Me (2013)
- You Will Be Safe Here (2019)
- The Two Roberts (2025)

=== Anthology appearances ===
- Imagine A Country (2020)
- Common People: An Anthology of Working-Class Writers (2019)
- Others (2019)
- Speak My Language, and Other Stories: An Anthology of Gay Fiction (2015)
- Out There (2014)

== Personal life ==
Barr lives in Brighton with his husband.
