= Tinner =

Tinner may refer to:

- A tinsmith
- A person involved in tin mining who came under the jurisdiction of the former Stannary Courts and Parliaments
- A person who applies a coating of tin to iron, copper, or brass
- Tinner (surname)

== See also ==
- The Tinners, a regiment formed by Nicholas Slanning during the English Civil War
- Tinners rabbits, another name for the three hares motif, and a dance by the same name
- Tinner's fluid, a common name for zinc chloride when used as a flux
