= Matt Balunas =

Scottish footballer

Personal information
- Full name: Matthew Balunas
- Date of birth: 7 January 1918
- Place of birth: Holytown, Scotland
- Date of death: 1 February 2006 (aged 88)
- Place of death: Bellshill, Scotland
- Position: Right back

Senior career*
Years	Team	Apps	(Gls)
–	Newarthill Hearts		
1944–1955	Third Lanark	220	(0)
1955–1956	Stranraer		
- * Club domestic league appearances and goals

Matthew Balunas (7 January 1918 – 1 February 2006) was a Scottish footballer who played as a right back.

A member of North Lanarkshire's Lithuanian immigrant community, Balunas spent almost his entire senior career (which only began in his mid 20s due to World War II) with Third Lanark, winning two Glasgow Merchants Charity Cups and featuring on the losing side in four Glasgow Cup finals. He was considered to be a reliable, uncomplicated and defensive-minded player.
