= Leigh Nicol =

Scottish footballer

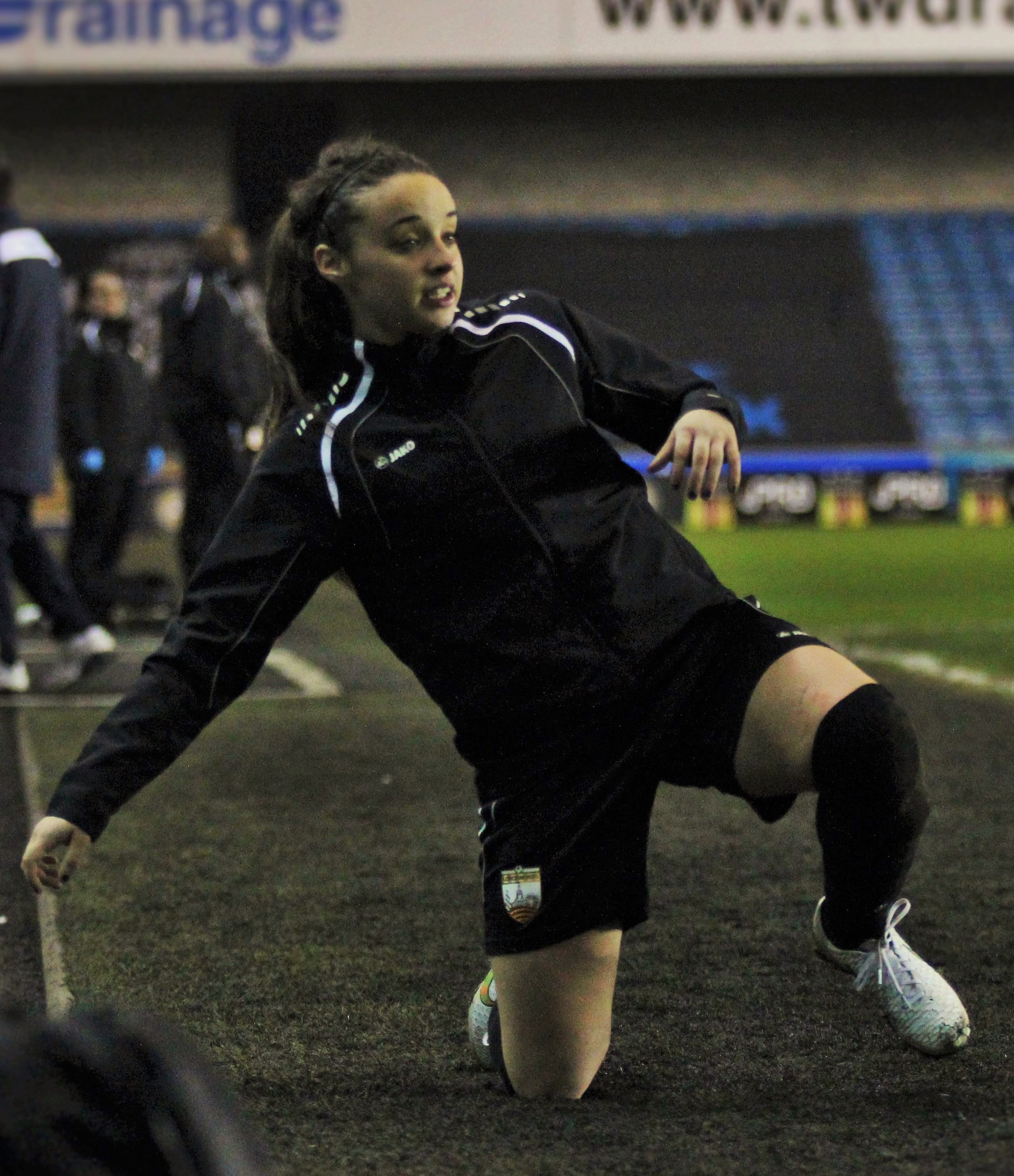
- Nicol with London Bees, 2015

Personal information
- Full name: Leigh Caitlyn Nicol
- Date of birth: 26 September 1995 (age 31)
- Place of birth: Bellshill, Scotland
- Position: Midfielder

Youth career
- Motherwell
- 2009–2012: Celtic
- 2013: Arsenal

Senior career*
Years	Team	Apps	(Gls)
2014	Reading Women	4	(0)
2015	London Bees	9	(1)
2016–2018	Millwall Lionesses	28	(1)
2018–2020	Charlton Athletic	7	(0)
2020–2023	Crystal Palace	14	(0)

International career
2009	Scotland U16	1	(0)
2010–2012	Scotland U17	6	(1)
2012–2014	Scotland U19	4	(0)
- * Club domestic league appearances and goals

Leigh Caitlyn Nicol (born 26 September 1995) is a Scottish retired footballer who last played for Crystal Palace in the English FA Women's Championship.

== Club career ==
Raised in Newarthill, Nicol started her footballing career at Motherwell Girls where she was captain of her age group from 2006 to 2008. She then moved onto Celtic's Academy where she captained the club's under-15, under-17 and reserve sides. With Celtic Nicol also won the SWF Scottish U17 Cup title in 2011.

She then moved to London in 2012 to secure a place at Arsenal's prestigious academy where she could continue her education whilst training and playing for the club's reserve side.

An opportunity to play first team football opened up when former Arsenal Ladies player Jayne Ludlow became manager of FA WSL 2 club Reading Women. This move led to Nicol and a number of other Arsenal reserve players joining Reading in 2014. Nicol had some success playing first team football for Reading but after one season she left at the beginning of 2015 to join London Bees to get more first team opportunities.

In February 2016 Nicol announced that she had signed for Millwall Lionesses. She went on to win the club's Player of the Year award in 2017.

Nicol announced her retirement from professional football in August 2023.

== International career ==
Nicol represented Scotland at under-16 level in a Challenge Match against Wales in November 2009. She also went on to play seven times for the under-17s and got on the scoresheet in a 5–0 win over Wales in April 2012. Her international career continued and she also went on to make a number of appearances at under-19 level; notable matches she was involved in at this level were a 7–3 win over Italy and a 14–1 victory against Georgia.

== Personal life ==
Her grandfather Jimmy Welsh was a footballer who played for Airdrieonians in the 1950s.

In 2021, Nicol spoke of her struggle to maintain her mental health following an incident of phone hacking two years earlier in which personal videos were circulated online.

== Honours ==
Celtic

- SWF Scottish Youth Cup: 2011

Individual

- Celtic Reserves Players Player of The Year: 2012
- Millwall Player of the Year: 2017
