= Scheme Birds =

- Film poster
- Directed by: Ellen Fiske, Ellinor Hallin
- Written by: Ellen Fiske, Ellinor Hallin
- Produced by: Mario Adamson, Ruth Reid
- Cinematography: Ellinor Hallin
- Edited by: Hanna Lejonqvist
- Music by: Charlie Jefferson
- Production companies: Sisyfos Film, Scottish Gid Films
- Release date: 5 May 2019 (Tribeca)
- Running time: 90 minutes
- Countries: Sweden; United Kingdom
- Language: English

Scheme Birds is a 2019 Swedish-British documentary film written and directed by Ellen Fiske and Ellinor Hallin. It focuses on a teenage girl living in poverty-stricken area in Scotland.

== Synopsis ==
Scheme Birds is a documentary centred on a working-class teenage girl, Gemma, living in Jerviston (Motherwell, Scotland). Her mother was a drug addict and abandoned her at birth, and she lives in grim circumstances. The title derives from the purpose-built public housing scheme where she lives in Motherwell.

== Production ==
The film was written and directed by Ellen Fiske and Ellinor Hallin, in their feature film debut as directors. It was produced by Mario Adamson and Ruth Reid through Sisyfos Film and Scottish Gid Films. Hanna Lejonqvist edited the film and Ellinor Hallin was responsible for the cinematography.

== Release and accolades ==
The film premiered at the 2019 Tribeca Film Festival, where it won the Best Feature Documentary award and the Best New Documentary Director award.
