= Jack Tonner =

English footballer

Personal information
- Full name: John Tonner
- Date of birth: 20 February 1898
- Place of birth: Holytown, Scotland
- Date of death: 1978 (aged 79–80)
- Position: Inside forward

Senior career*
Years	Team	Apps	(Gls)
1918–1919	Dunfermline Athletic		
1919–1926	Clapton Orient	143	(35)
1926–1927	Fulham	28	(13)
1927–1928	Crystal Palace	24	(7)
1928	Thames		
Total		195	(55)
- * Club domestic league appearances and goals

John Tonner (20 February 1898 – 1978) was a Scottish footballer who played in the Football League for Bristol City, Crystal Palace and Clapton Orient. His brothers Jimmy and Sam were also professional footballers.
