= Carfin Grotto =

Catholic shrine in Scotland

Coordinates: 55.8056°N 3.9553°W

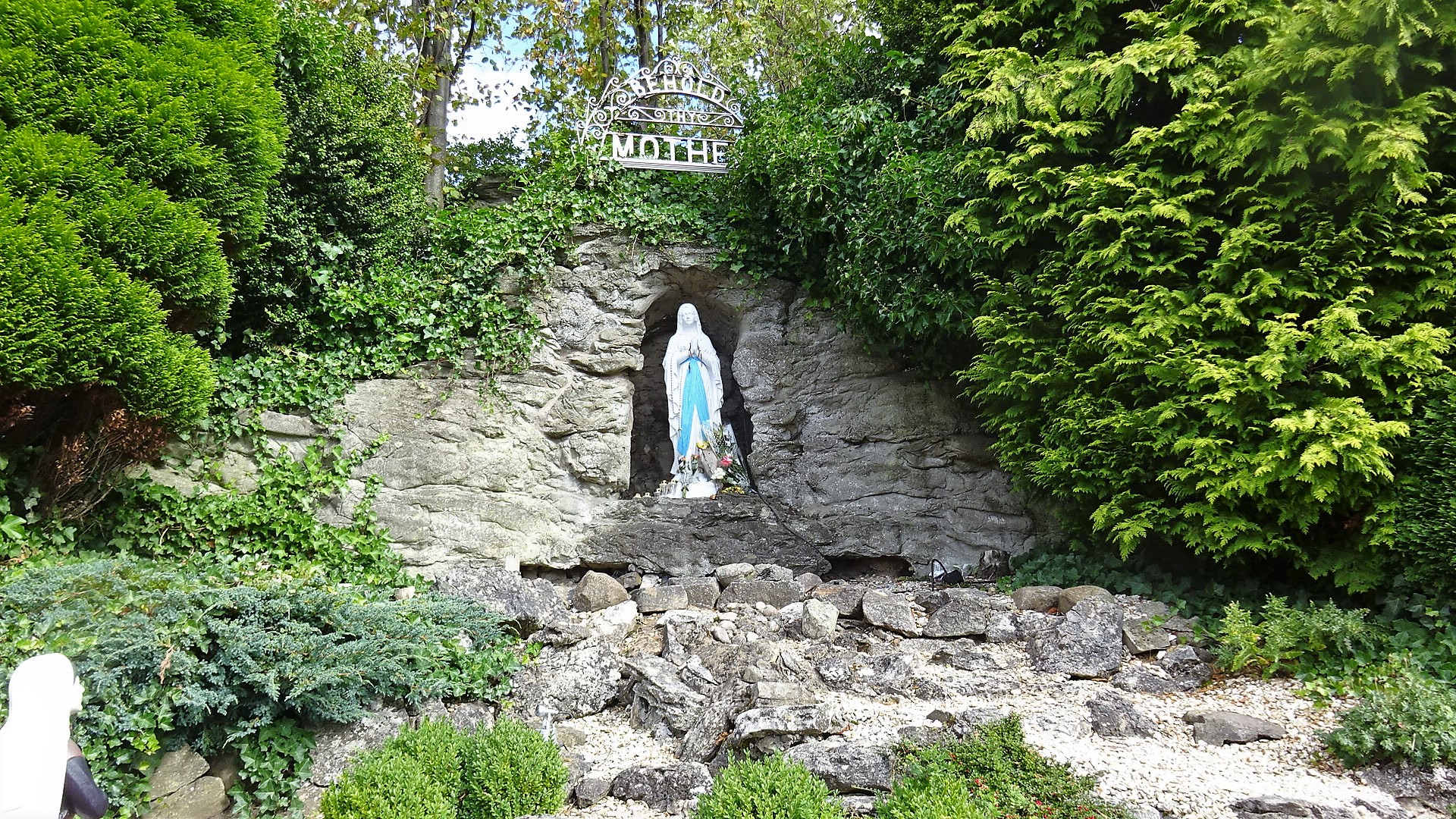
The Shrine to Our Lady of Lourdes and Saint Bernadette, Carfin Grotto

Carfin Lourdes Grotto is a Catholic shrine in Scotland dedicated to Our Lady of Lourdes and created in the early twentieth century. The "Carfin Grotto", as the shrine is locally termed, was the brainchild of Canon Thomas N. Taylor (died 1963), parish priest of St. Francis Xavier's Parish in the small, mining village of Carfin, which lies two miles east of Motherwell, in the central south of Scotland.

Following a trip to France's principal Marian shrine at Lourdes, Taylor's vision was to build a religious memorial in honour of the Virgin Mary based on the template of the Grotto of Massabielle. To realize this vision became his life's work.

Since its opening in the early 1920s, the Grotto has attracted pilgrims in the hundreds of thousands and its environs have been modified and enhanced with rich Catholic symbols and buildings. The grotto shrine offers a pilgrimage season with Sunday processions, rosaries, outdoor Masses and dedicated feast day events which run annually from early May until late September.

== Early days ==
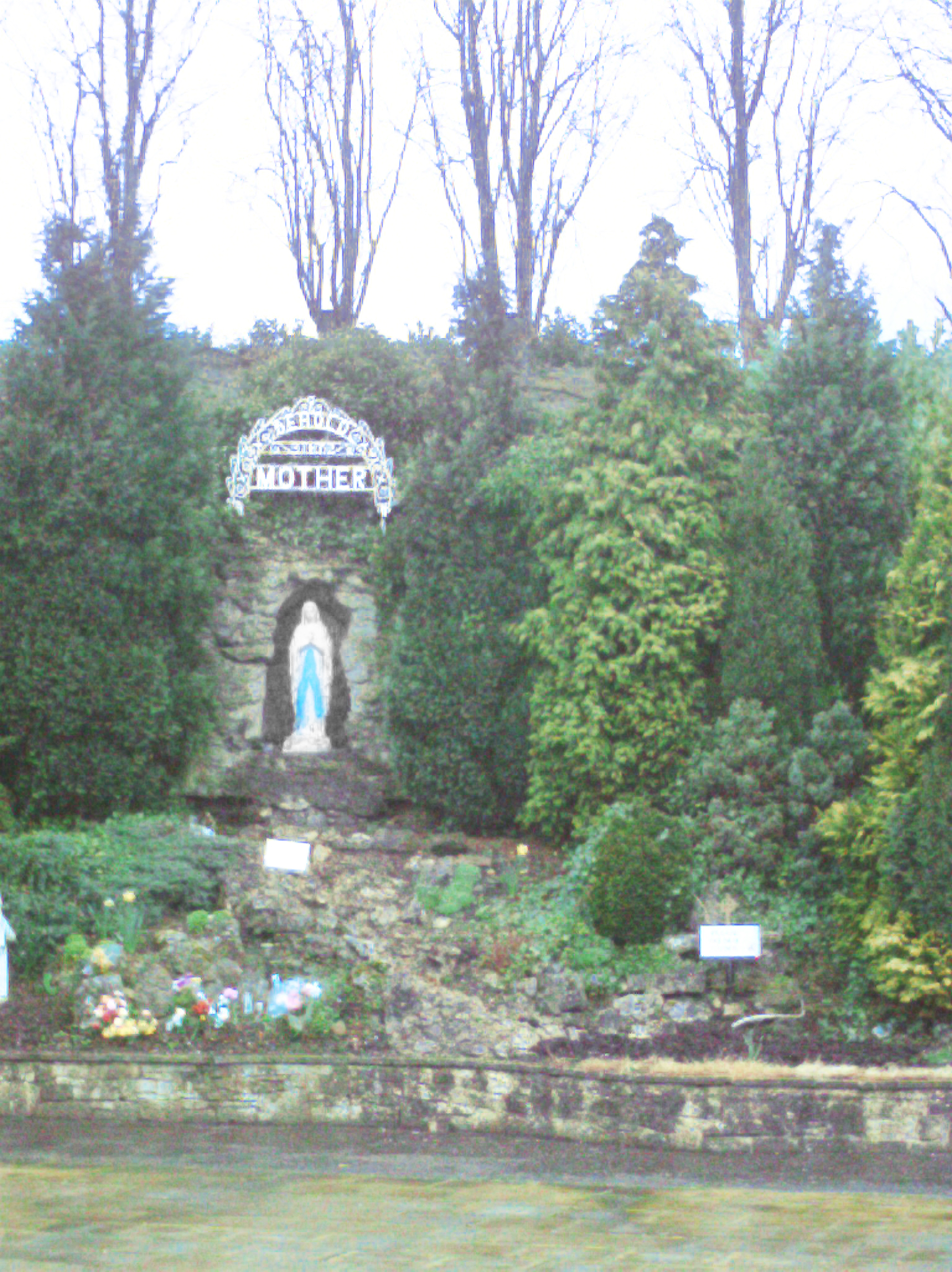
Statue of Mary at Carfin

Work on the Carfin version of the Lourdes Grotto began in the early 1920s. The shrine was built, by hand, by local parishioners on a site opposite the St. Francis Xavier's parish Church. Many of the builders were coal miners from Carfin and neighbouring villages out of work during the 1921 Coal Miners' Strike. It is said that Fr. Taylor was aware of the need to keep these workers occupied to minimise the effects of unemployment on their morale. Fr. Taylor inspired hard work and dedication from his workers.

Starting with a bare field in 1920, a frantic period of endeavour driven by the faith and zeal of the volunteers resulted in the shrine being largely complete within two years. It officially opened in 1922. The Grotto's central scene depicted Our Lady's appearance to Saint Bernadette in a bricked, terraced garden which included an altar for outdoor Mass, when the West of Scotland weather allowed. Canon Taylor's book of the shrine's first thirty years records over 300 volunteers working on the grotto in its first two decades. He also records a single pilgrimage of over fifty thousand pilgrims in 1924.

== Growth and development of the shrine ==
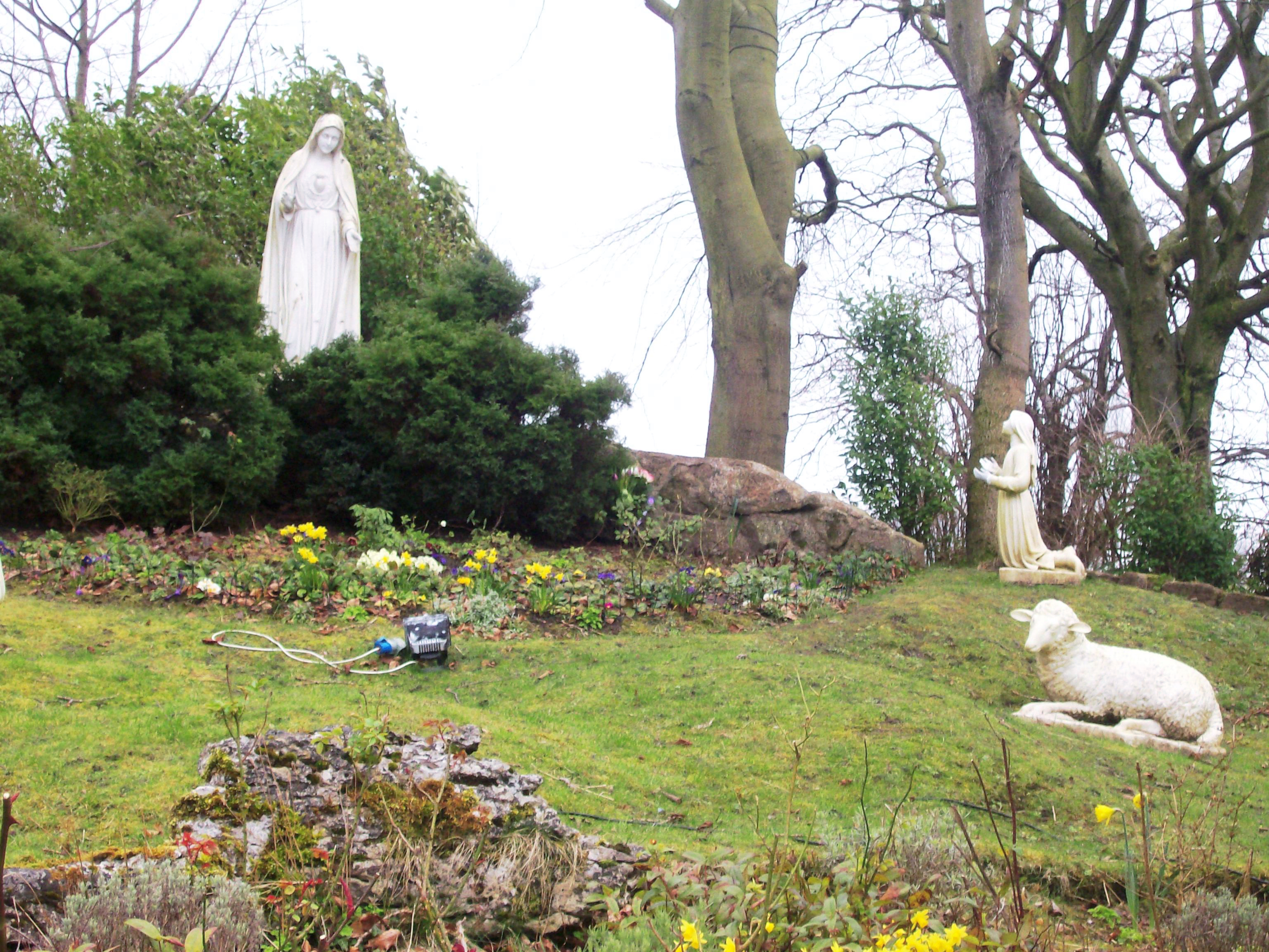
Shrine of Our Lady of Fatima

The shrine opened in late 1922 and it quickly became a pilgrimage site for Catholics from across Scotland and the rest of the world. Services were held for the Polish and Lithuanian communities that had settled in Scotland. Hundreds of thousands of pilgrims of different faiths have visited Carfin.

The shrine expanded beyond a single field to many acres between 1922 and the 1960s. The Grotto later added a Glass Chapel situated on a raised "Headland" above the main pilgrim walkway. The Grotto grounds house many life-size depictions of Christ, Our Blessed Lady and many saints. It also contains a life-size representation of Jesus' life with Mary and Joseph in their Loretto house and carpentry shop, which is depicted in a cave, a Reliquary, as well as a sunken garden. Many statues and artifacts were added to the central Lourdes Grotto scene. Other depictions include the Way of the Cross, a large number of statues of saints, and a statue honouring Our Lady, Star of the Sea, complete with miniature lakes.

On Sunday afternoons at 3 pm, between May and October, Rosary processions are held, usually attended by thousands of visitors. The rosary is led by the parish priest, a tradition started by Fr. Taylor and carried on by his successor, Fr. George Mullen (later Canon George Mullen). The priest would stand on the parapet of the Glass Chapel, from which there was a clear view of the Grotto and of the procession along the shrine's gravel paths. Each Sunday procession culminated in Benediction of the Blessed Sacrament in the upper Glass Chapel. Many local people remember the discomfort of kneeling in the gravel as children, at the moment of adoration in the Benediction service.

== St. Thérèse of Lisieux ==
In addition to his devotion to Our Lady of Lourdes, Canon Taylor also admired Saint Thérèse of Lisieux, the "Little Flower". This admiration began when he learned of Lisieux's young Sister Therese's life during his frequent visits to France in the early 1900s where devotion to the Carmelite nun rose rapidly following her death in 1897. One catalyst for this growth was the posthumous publication of St. Thérèse's autobiography, Story of A Soul. In the Summer of 1901, the Canon was urged by a priest friend, Father Bernard Lynch, to read the new English translation of the young French nun's inspirational autobiography by Michael Daziwicki, a polish professor. The Canon was so moved by the young nun's life story that he contacted the enclosed Carmel convent in Lisieux and built a strong bond with the Prioiress, Mother Mary of Gonazaga, and with St. Therese's three surviving sisters who were also Carmelite nuns in the Lisieux convent, with a view to helping promote the life story of this extraordinary young woman. Quickly, Canon Taylor became an acknowledged expert on the life and work of St. Thérèse and, beginning in 1902, published regular articles in Catholic newspapers of the day of to engender broader awareness of the young Carmelite nun of Lisieux throughout the United Kingdom. Thanks to the Canon's efforts, her enclosed life of devotion to Jesus and her "little way" to God attracted considerable admiration in Scotland, England and Ireland following his publications. Canon Taylor believed that St. Thérèse, a future Doctor of the Church, would become an important figure early in the new century. He also spoke to the Vatican Committee which considered St. Thérèse's cause for canonization and was present in Rome in 1925 soon before little Thérèse was proclaimed a Saint of the Church.

So, as a measure of his devotion to the Little Flower, the Canon added a statue of St. Thérèse directly across from that of Our Lady of Lourdes. The shrine's statue to St. Thérèse was erected within weeks of her beatification in Rome by Pope Pius XI on 29 April 1923, an event which the Canon attended. The decision to erect the statue was controversial. Some pilgrims expressed the view that this "new" Saint's statue should not stand in such proximity to that of the Blessed Mother. The Canon took the unusual step of collecting these opinions and sending copies to the Superior of the Carmelite convent in France where St. Thérèse had lived her vocational life. The Mother Superior's advice was that the statue should remain in its location, and she predicted that the Carfin Lourdes Grotto would enjoy large numbers of pilgrims as a result.

St. Thérèse of Lisieux is the secondary patroness of the Grotto after Our Lady.

In August of 2019 the relics of Bernadette of Lourdes were brought to Scotland specifically the chapel and grotto, where 30,000 people came to visit the relics. Students from Taylor High School, New Stevenston carried the relics from St Theresa's church into the vehicle in which they were taken to Carfin, and then from the vehicle into St Xavier's church.

== National and international pilgrims ==
By the time of Canon Taylor's death in 1963, the Carfin Lourdes Grotto enjoyed a high national profile and attracted tens of thousands of pilgrims annually. Among the many seasonal pilgrimages to the shrine, each May, First Communicants from surrounding diocesan parishes visited for procession, with lines of white-dressed girls and school-blazered boys. As the region is rich in Irish immigrants, local Hibernian groups attended the shrine annually on procession. Lithuanian and Polish groups also attended the shrine on annual pilgrimage.

== New additions ==
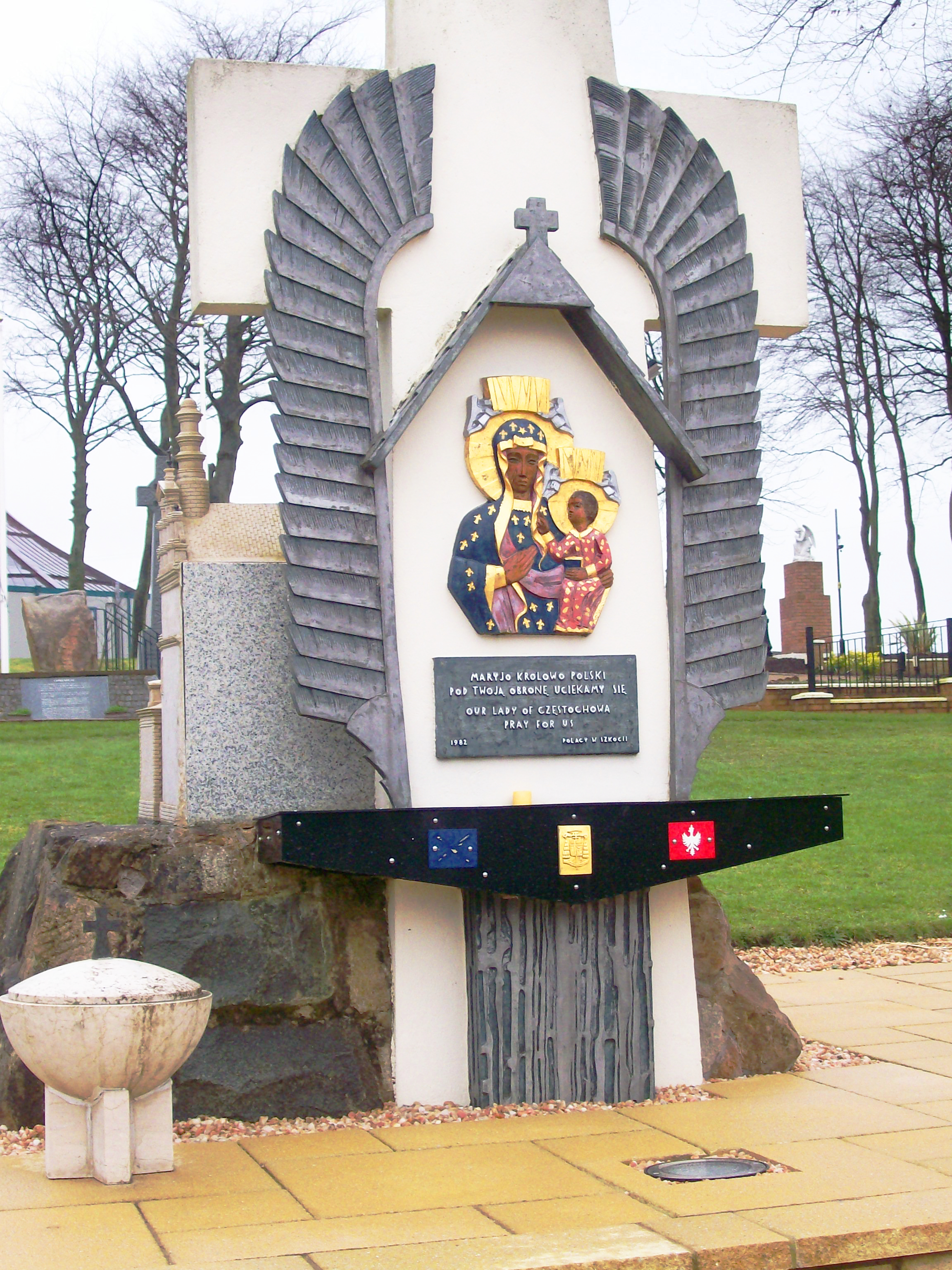
Memorial to Black Madonna of Częstochowa

Following the 1988 Glasgow Garden Festival, the glass chapel used at the event was relocated to Carfin Grotto, where it was placed near the arena of Our Lady, Star of the Sea in the lower garden area of the grotto. This building, the grotto's second Glass Chapel, was subsequently dedicated in June 1989 to the victims of the Lockerbie Disaster. Daily Mass is now celebrated in this glass chapel, now named Our Lady, Maid of the Seas after the ill-fated aircraft from Pan Am Flight 103, which crashed near the Scottish town of Lockerbie on 21 December 1988.

More recently, the Reliquary opened within the Grotto grounds and features many religious artifacts used throughout the years at various processions and celebrations.

Most recently, a new Pilgrimage Centre opened in 1997, featuring an exhibition of the history of different faiths and beliefs, as well as displaying various religious artifacts. The centre also features a café and shop. In 2019 the diocese announced plans to close the pilgrimage centre, prompting a petition opposing the decision. This was discussed on BBC Radio 4's Sunday programme on 18 August 2019. Since 2021, and as of March 2026, the website states that the pilgrimage centre is currently closed but renovations are underway to reopen it.

== See also ==
- Catholic Church in Scotland
