= Brannock High School =

Coordinates: 55°48′38.58″N 3°57′33.96″W

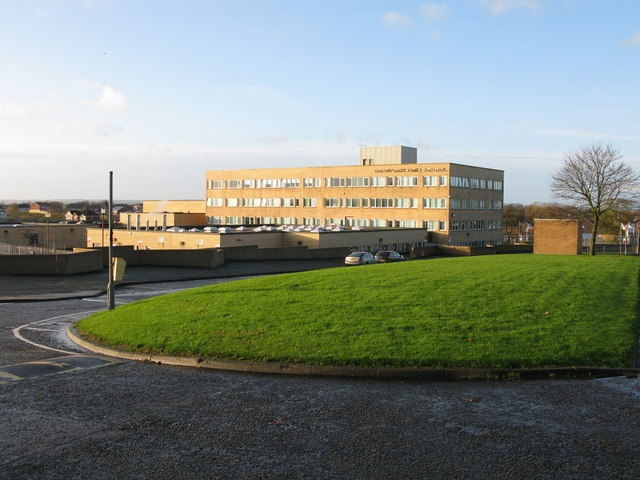
- Brannock High Main Building

Location
- Loanhead Road; Newarthill, Motherwell, ML1 5AY; Scotland

Information
- Type: Secondary School
- Motto: Concordia
- Established: 18 August 1982
- Headteacher: Kevin McConnachie
- Enrolment: 630
- Houses: Isle of Arran, Isle of Bute & Isle of Lewis
- Colours: Light Blue, Navy Blue, Gold and Black
- Website: https://blogs.glowscotland.org.uk/nl/brannock/

Brannock High School is a non-denominational, co-educational comprehensive secondary school in Newarthill, North Lanarkshire, Scotland. It is situated on Loanhead Road. It guides learners throughout Scotland's national curriculum and supports learners with various needs of help, like the PSE base to help students through councilling or Support For Learning to aid pupils who struggle in various subjects.

== Feeder schools ==
The school catchment area takes in Carfin, Holytown, New Stevenston and Newarthill, in which the associated primary schools are Holytown Primary School, Keir Hardie Memorial Primary School, New Stevenston Primary School and Newarthill Primary School. A number of pupils from the Bellshill area also attend.

== Language and Communication Support Centre ==
There is a Language and Communication Support Centre based within the school for young people with ASD. The LCSC also has various assistants in class for ASD pupils.

== Brannock High School Parent Council ==
Brannock High School has a Parent Council, which was set up to partially support the intentions of the Scottish Schools (Parental Involvement) Act 2006

( https://brannockhs.parentcouncil.scot )
