= Jimmy Tonner =

Scottish footballer

Personal information
- Full name: James Edward Tonner
- Date of birth: 31 March 1896
- Place of birth: Bridgeton, Scotland
- Date of death: 1985 (aged 88–89)
- Height: 5 ft 8 in (1.73 m)
- Position: Wing half

Senior career*
Years	Team	Apps	(Gls)
- Dunfermline Athletic
1919–1920	Clapton Orient	12	(0)
- Lochgelly United
- Bo'ness
1924–1926	Burnley	37	(2)
- Hamilton Academical
- * Club domestic league appearances and goals

James Edward Tonner (31 March 1896 – 1985) was a Scottish professional footballer who played as a winger. His brothers Jack and Sam were also professional footballers.
