= Tonnerre =

Tonnerre (English: Thunder) is a French word meaning "thunder". It may refer to:

== Places ==
=== Canada ===
- Rivière-au-Tonnerre, Quebec, a municipality of the Minganie Regional County Municipality
- Tonnerre River (Normandin River), a tributary of the Normandin River
- Tonnerre River (Minganie), a tributary of the Gulf of Saint Lawrence

=== France ===
- Mont-Tonnerre, former French department
- Tonnerre, Yonne, French commune of Yonne
  - County of Tonnerre, medieval county based in Tonnerre, Yonne

== Other uses ==
- Tonnerre (film), a 2013 French film
- Boisrond-Tonnerre (1776–1806), Haitian writer and historian
- French ship Tonnerre (L9014), an amphibious assault helicopter carrier of the French Navy

== See also ==
- Lightning rod (French: paratonnerre), a device that protects a building or structure from lightning
