= Newhouse, North Lanarkshire =

Coordinates: 55°49′55″N 3°55′41″W

Newhouse
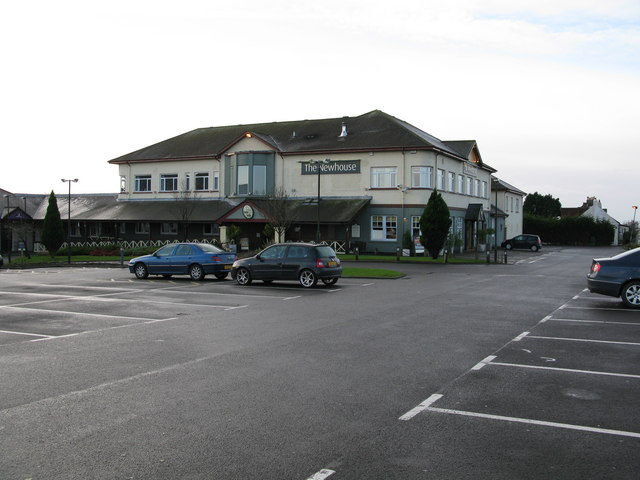
- Formerly known as the Newhouse Hotel prior to extensive modernisation, The Newhouse pub has been a landmark for many years, particularly well-known when the old A8 passed through Newhouse

- Location within North Lanarkshire
- OS grid reference: NS790612
- Council area: North Lanarkshire
- Lieutenancy area: Lanarkshire
- Country: Scotland
- Sovereign state: United Kingdom
- Post town: MOTHERWELL
- Postcode district: ML1
- Dialling code: 01698
- Police: Scotland
- Fire: Scottish
- Ambulance: Scottish
- UK Parliament: Airdrie and Shotts
- Scottish Parliament: Uddingston and Bellshill

Newhouse is a hamlet and major road interchange located in North Lanarkshire, Scotland, sited immediately east of the Eurocentral industrial park, south of Chapelhall, two miles (three kilometres) west of the village of Salsburgh, 1 3/4 mi (2.8 km) east of Holytown and about 4 mi (6 km) north east of Motherwell.

It consists of four small houses, a Premier Inn hotel and Beefeater restaurant, a BP petrol station under the name "Peggy White's Ltd", and a garden centre. It also has a large industrial park which is a regional base for several multinational companies including Terex and Honeywell, as well as the Newhouse Research Site and the Scottish distribution centre for the Co-operative Food Group.

It was formerly a terminus for a railway line from Airdrie, and had several coal mines. Since the decline of the industry in the area, the mines have closed down, along with most of the inhabitants having left.

It was also a historic crossing place for north–south and east–west traffic, being on the two former trunk routes of the A8 (between Glasgow and Edinburgh) and the A73 (from Cumbernauld and the north of Scotland to Carlisle and into England). The road junction on which the hamlet is situated remains very busy and is prone to traffic congestion at peak times, since it is where the current A73 (now detrunked and supplanted by the M74), A775 and B7066 meet, just south of the M8 motorway (Junction 6 accessed from the A73 is named Newhouse – it now only provides a westbound offramp and eastbound onramp, with the opposite provided by nearby Junction 6a Chapelhall, accessed via the realigned A8).

It is notorious for its bad weather, as it is one of the highest points on the M8. The height also enables it to command a view over most of the Clyde Valley and Campsie Fells.

Keir Hardie, the founder of the Labour Party and one of the first two Labour MPs elected to the UK Parliament was born in a cottage on the western edge of Newhouse. This cottage still exists on Legbrannock Avenue leading to Newarthill, now surrounded by the Newhouse Industrial Estate.
