= Sam Tonner =

English footballer

Personal information
- Full name: Samuel Tonner
- Date of birth: 10 August 1894
- Place of birth: Dunfermline, Scotland
- Date of death: 1976 (aged 81–82)
- Position: Full-back

Senior career*
Years	Team	Apps	(Gls)
1913–1914	Inverkeithing		
1914–1915	Dunfermline Athletic		
1919–1925	Clapton Orient	186	(13)
1925–1926	Bristol City	6	(1)
1926–1927	Crystal Palace	2	(0)
1927	Armadale		
Total		194	(14)
- * Club domestic league appearances and goals

Samuel Tonner (10 August 1894 – 1976) was a Scottish footballer who played in the Football League for Bristol City, Crystal Palace, and Clapton Orient. His brothers Jack and Jimmy were also professional footballers.
