= Tinner (surname) =

Tinner is a surname. Notable people with the surname include:

- Beat Tinner, Swiss politician
- Friedrich Tinner, Swiss engineer
- René Tinner, Swiss recording engineer and producer
- Urs Tinner, Swiss engineer and former undercover CIA agent
