= New Stevenston =

Village in North Lanarkshire, Scotland

Coordinates: 55.815247°N 3.976134°W

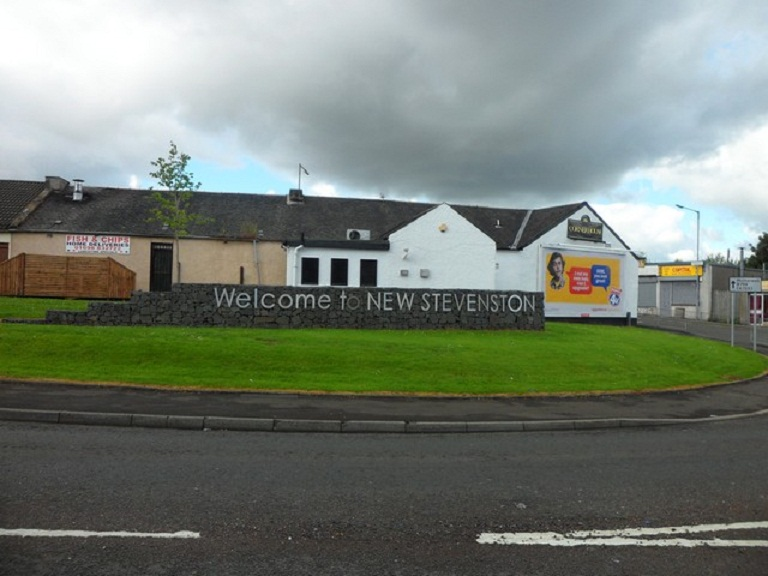
- New Stevenston Welcome sign.

- Location within North Lanarkshire
- Area: 1.72 km^{2} (0.66 sq mi)
- Population: 6,070 (2020)
  - Density: 3,529/km^{2} (9,140/sq mi)
- OS grid reference: NS 7627 5976
- Council area: North Lanarkshire
- Lieutenancy area: Lanarkshire
- Country: Scotland
- Sovereign state: United Kingdom
- Post town: Motherwell
- Postcode district: ML1 4
- Dialling code: 01698
- Police: Scotland
- Fire: Scottish
- Ambulance: Scottish
- UK Parliament: Motherwell and Wishaw
- Scottish Parliament: Uddingston and Bellshill

New Stevenston is a village situated between Motherwell and Bellshill in North Lanarkshire, Scotland. Most local amenities are shared with the adjacent villages of Carfin, Holytown and Newarthill which have a combined population of around 20,000 across the four localities.

== History ==
The settlement first formed as part of the parish of Holytown when substantial coal workings were being exploited during the 19th century. The village prospered and so when the Church of Scotland suffered Disruption in 1843 the new Free Church was constructed in New Stevenston or Wrangholm to serve the mining community.

With the decline of coal mining and the rise of the steel and heavy engineering industries, the bulk of the population were employed until the serious industrial decline of the late 20th century, culminating in the closure of the Ravenscraig steelworks in 1992.

Employment has shifted towards more diverse occupations and housing development has continued. There has been significant redevelopment since the late-1960s when the bulk of the late 19th-century tenement flats were demolished.

== Schools ==
The village is served by two primary schools: St. Patrick's Primary School and New Stevenston Primary School which share a joint campus incorporating New Stevenston Library. Formerly, the two were on separate sites until the present campus was constructed.

Secondary education is provided at the Roman Catholic Taylor High School, which is situated in the village and at the nearby non-denominational Brannock High School, Newarthill.

Originally, the schools of the village were New Stevenston Public School, originally adjacent to the Free Kirk and then located further west in Clydesdale St. in 1896. It had both primary and junior secondary departments (New Stevenston Junior Secondary School) and became New Stevenston Primary School on the introduction of comprehensive education. St Patrick's RC school retained junior secondary status for longer, but also became a primary school when sufficient provision of RC high schools for the area was finally made by Strathclyde Region. The two primary schools have a new joint campus on the site of the former St Patrick's buildings on Park Street, opposite to the War Memorial, in 2006. The old 1896 Public School has now been demolished. The co-existence of non-denominational and Roman Catholic schools in this area, even to the extent of a joint campus, is a legacy of the 1918 Education Act, its origins and its continuing aftermath.

== Places of worship ==
Ethnic and cultural diversity has broadened and there is now a purpose-built mosque on the site of the former apprentices' training school of the old Stewarts & Lloyds tube works. The coal mining past is still significant; the area has suffered widespread undermining, which was a serious limit to new construction until relatively recently. The local church has cracked walls, garden depressions and tie bars as evidence for this.

- St. John Bosco's R.C. Church: the church building was opened in 1959, but the original Parish was founded in 1946. Between then and the building of the current church, services were held in a makeshift chapel affectionately called 'the Hut', which stood adjacent to the burn, and 'Garvey's building', at the corner of Shirrel Road. Well remembered priests who served in the Parish in the 1950s and 60s include Fr. McGlynn, Fr. Barry, Dr. Cahill, Fr. O'Regan, Fr. Corless, Fr. O'Donaghue, Fr. O'Hare, and Fr. Devanney.
- New Stevenston Methodist Church
- Wrangholm Kirk (Church of Scotland): This is the successor to the Free Church built in the 1840s and is the longest continuously worshipping group in the village as well as the oldest place of worship. The congregation share a minister with the neighbouring parish of Holytown and are part of the presbytery of Hamilton. Its longest-serving minister was the Rev Alexander Dale (from 1910 to 1944). A plaque in the church commemorates his service and it is rumoured that Dale Drive (on the north side of the Legbrannock Burn) was named in his honour.
- Assembly Hall (Christian Brethren)
- Lanarkshire Mosque is also on the boundary between New Stevenston and Mossend.

== Amenities ==
- Co-operative Store (with ATM outside). This was opened around December 1968 as part of Dalziel Cooperative Society, to replace their original store on Clydesdale Street, near to the Public school. Dalziel Cooperative also operated milk vans, a coal van, baker and butcher vans, which came round the streets most days
- New Stevenston Community Centre

In the past, there were also shops opposite St. John Bosco's church: The Dairy (Fyfe's?) and McIvor's shops where the monumental sculptor now operates. Also, there was Cochrane's shop at the corner of Jerviston St. and Woodside St. where there is now a hairdresser. There was also a John Menzies shop in the railway station.

== Transportation ==
New Stevenston is served by Holytown railway station, which is in fact in the village bounds, offering services to all stations towards Glasgow Central and Edinburgh Waverley. This permits connections to all Great Britain railway stations from Wick to Penzance.

The village is also accessible by the A723 road, leading to places such as Motherwell and the M8 motorway accessing Glasgow and Edinburgh and linking to the motorway network for easy access to other parts of Scotland.
