= Newarthill =

Coordinates: 55.81°N 3.9333°W

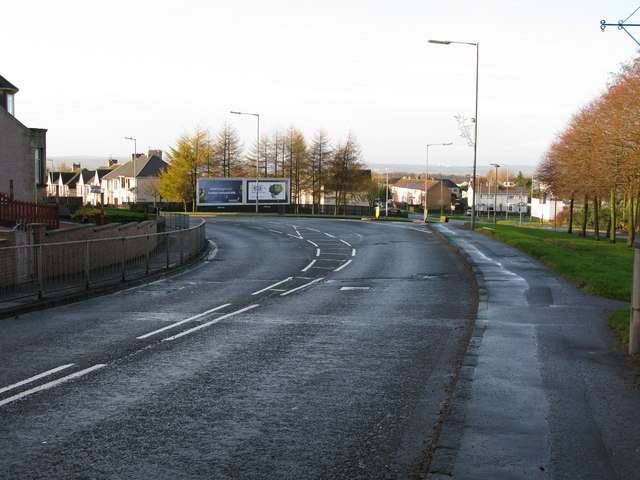
- The main road in Newarthill, in the direction towards Motherwell

- Location within North Lanarkshire
- Area: 4.61 km^{2} (1.78 sq mi)
- Population: 6,720 (2020)
  - Density: 1,458/km^{2} (3,780/sq mi)
- OS grid reference: NS766606
- Council area: North Lanarkshire
- Lieutenancy area: Lanarkshire
- Country: Scotland
- Sovereign state: United Kingdom
- Post town: Motherwell
- Postcode district: ML1 5
- Dialling code: 01698
- Police: Scotland
- Fire: Scottish
- Ambulance: Scottish
- UK Parliament: Motherwell and Wishaw
- Scottish Parliament: Uddingston and Bellshill

Newarthill is a village in North Lanarkshire, Scotland, situated roughly three miles north-east of the town of Motherwell. It has a population of around 6,200. Most local amenities are shared with the adjacent villages of Carfin, Holytown and New Stevenston which have a combined population of around 20,000 across the four localities.

== History ==
Situated on rich tracts of coal and other minerals, the original settlement of Newarthill occurred in the early to mid-nineteenth century. Originally thought to have been named after the larger and more northerly Harthill, it has recently been discovered that historical mentions of Newarthill actually pre-date Harthill. One quoted, but unproven, derivation is the Gaelic Nuadh-Ard, meaning New Hill, with a tautological "hill" added in the English translation.

== Geography ==
The town of Newarthill is roughly bounded by the Legbrannock Burn to the north, the railway line connecting Carfin and Cleland to the south, the junction of the B7066 with Biggar Road to the east and the A723 to the west. Situated on the northern side of the Clyde Valley, the town rises highest in the north east and slopes downward to the west. The higher land was the centre of initial settlement and holds most of the town's oldest and most significant buildings. Several modern housing estates have appeared on the outskirts and greenbelt areas of the village, rendering it less distinct from the surrounding conurbation.

There is no town centre as such, with residents chiefly relying on the amenities provided by neighbouring places such as Motherwell, Hamilton, Wishaw, Airdrie and Glasgow. It is generally considered to consist of two schemes, the older, formerly coal-heated east and the more recent, gas-powered west. This perception has altered in light of large new housing estates encircling the village.

== Amenities ==
The local schools are Newarthill Primary, St Teresa's Primary, Keir Hardie Memorial Primary and Brannock High School. The local authority-funded community centre, also on High Street, offers a range of activities from nursery care to computing classes. The library on Kirkhall Road offers a modern range of books and other media despite the distinctly 1970s exterior. Sports facilities are few and far between, with the existing pitches within school grounds long since closed to the general public. But the Brannock High School MUGA (Multi Use Games Arena) has recently been opening up.

The local police station which previously lay near the centre of the village has been converted to houses. Fire brigade and hospital facilities have to be sought outwith Newarthill. The nearest hospitals are Wishaw General and Monklands Infirmary in Airdrie. There are two main places of worship, St. Teresa's Chapel and Newarthill Parish Church, with the nearest mosque in New Stevenston.

=== Travel and transport facilities ===
Newarthill is situated in close proximity to the M8, offering road connections to Glasgow, Edinburgh, between and beyond. The B7066 is the major connecting route to Carfin and Motherwell, while those heading west on minor roads will generally do so through Holytown, Mossend and beyond. These roads are well served by regular bus services by companies including First Bus's X5 to get from Glasgow Main Centre to the village and the X44 to return and united 1 These services generally operate until 5pm. Service is limited on Sundays. There are several local taxi companies with varying levels of service.

The closest railway stations, depending on your position in Newarthill, are to be found at Carfin and Holytown (rather confusingly, Carfin Station is partially located within Newarthill and Holytown Station is within the adjacent village of New Stevenston) which are served by regularly timetabled trains operated by ScotRail, connecting Glasgow and Edinburgh. There is a two-hourly service on Sundays. The nearest mainline station, connecting to services on the East Coast Main Line and West Coast Main Line travelling towards cities such as London, is Motherwell.

=== Sports and leisure ===
Newarthill Bowling Club exists just off High Street and adjacent to Newarthill Primary School, however it remains a members-only facility. On Mosshall Street, there are several football pitches and an amateur boxing club.

Newarthill has few leisure facilities of note, excepting the facilities within Brannock High School and at Mosshall Street (where the boxing club is located). The village is, however, situated very close to several large sports facilities in the surrounding area, with Dalziel Park (sports fields and golf club), Colville Park Golf Club and Ravenscraig Sports Centre. The residents of Newarthill make use largely of the Aquatec Leisure Centre which is located on the outskirts of nearby Motherwell Town Centre. The facilities available here used to include a family friendly swimming pool and a well equipped gym. But recently the pool has permanently closed and only the gym is open.

The Torrance Park golf course and leisure facility between Newarthill and Newhouse was completed in 2019, forming part of a wider residential development off the main road to Holytown and nominally linked to that village in documentation, but sharing a postcode with Newarthill and being counted alongside it in some statistics.

There is also a local amateur football team, Newarthill Athletic AFC, who were founded in 2015. They follow a long list of teams from the area including Yett Farm Boys Club.

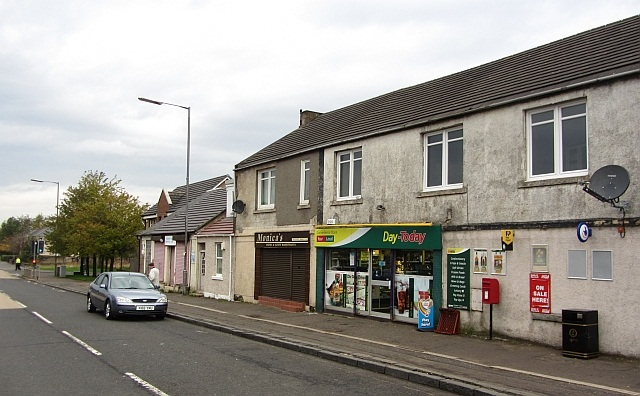
Main Street in Newarthill

== Notable figures ==
- Damian Barr, journalist
- Charlie Flynn, boxer
- Rhonda Jones, footballer
- Christopher Kane, fashion designer
- Liz Lochhead, playwright, author and former Poet Laureate of Scotland
- Gary McAllister, Scotland international midfielder
- Sir Robert McAlpine, construction industry figure
- Hugh McJarrow, footballer
- Leigh Nicol, footballer
- Elaine C. Smith, actress and comedian
- Jock Watson, footballer
