= Carfin =

Village in Lanarkshire, Scotland

Coordinates: 55.800866°N 3.964831°W

Carfin: Scottish Gaelic: An Càrn Fionn
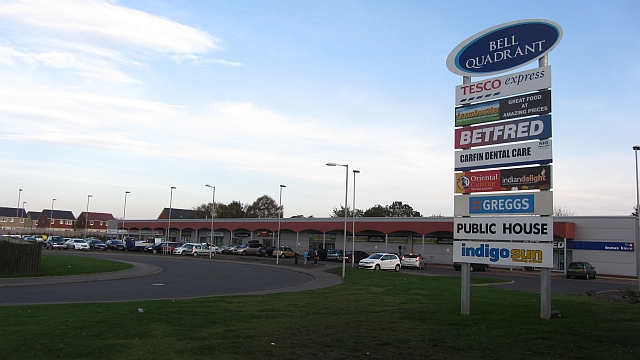
- Bell Quadrant Shopping Centre, Carfin

- Location within North Lanarkshire
- Area: 1.54 km^{2} (0.59 sq mi)
- Population: 3,870 (2020)
  - Density: 2,513/km^{2} (6,510/sq mi)
- OS grid reference: NS769581
- Council area: North Lanarkshire
- Lieutenancy area: Lanarkshire
- Country: Scotland
- Sovereign state: United Kingdom
- Post town: Motherwell
- Postcode district: ML1
- Dialling code: 01698
- Police: Scotland
- Fire: Scottish
- Ambulance: Scottish
- UK Parliament: Motherwell, Wishaw and Carluke
- Scottish Parliament: Uddingston and Bellshill

Carfin (Scottish Gaelic: An Càrn Fionn, meaning the White Cairn) is a village in North Lanarkshire in the central lowlands of Scotland, situated to the north-east of Motherwell. Most local amenities are shared with the adjacent villages of Holytown, Newarthill and New Stevenston which have a combined population of around 20,000 across the four localities.

== Local facilities ==
Carfin has strong Irish Catholic links, which are exemplified in Carfin Grotto a famous pilgrimage place, with extensive gardens and a visitors' centre with cafe. It was built in the early 1920s, when parish priest, Canon Thomas Nimmo Taylor engaged the unemployed miners of the village to build a shrine to Our Lady of Lourdes, allowing people in Scotland to venerate the Blessed Virgin without having to travel to France or Ireland to do so. Carfin also gained national attention in 1924 when the local MP Hugh Ferguson used what was seen as an outdated anti-Catholic law to stop Carfin's Corpus Christi procession from using the public roads, becoming a trigger for the 1926 Catholic Relief Act which among other things legalised Catholic processions.

There are many places of worship in Carfin. A church hall is present and a small mosque for Muslims, which in 2006 was moved to a bigger mosque near Mossend, Bellshill. A community church met in the community centre but due to an increase in attendance has moved to a larger community centre in Craigneuk, Wishaw.

The closest secondary school is Taylor High School in nearby New Stevenston. Since this is a Roman Catholic school, the nearest nondenominational secondary school is Brannock High School in Newarthill.

The nearest public house is the Hibernian Social and Recreation Club (The Hibs Club) 200 metres away to the Newarthill side. The Bell Quadrant is the main shopping area in Carfin.

The outskirts of Carfin do offer some interest, with a private golf club/rugby fields/driving range complex situated between Carfin and Holytown. Carfin is also next-door to the new settlement of Ravenscraig, currently under construction.

Carfin doesn't have many sports facilities of note, with nearby Brannock and Taylor High Schools containing both football pitches and athletics tracks. The nearest sports facility is the large Ravenscraig Sports Centre.

The golf course, named after Sam Torrance (Torrance Park), was funded by former Rangers chairman David Murray.

At the 2001 census, Carfin had a population of 1,048 residents.

== Transport ==
Carfin railway station provides the hub for transport to Glasgow, with the local bus stops providing easy access to Motherwell and surrounding towns. These services operate a restricted timetable on Sundays. The station lies on the boundary between Carfin and neighbouring Newarthill.

== Sport ==
An association football club from the village, Carfin Shamrock F.C., reached the fifth round of the 1887–88 Scottish Cup. Another senior club, Carfin Emmet F.C., played in the Midland League in the 1900s.
