= Holytown =

Village in North Lanarkshire, Scotland

Coordinates: 55.82288°N 3.97013°W

Holytown: Scottish Gaelic: Baile a' Chuilinn
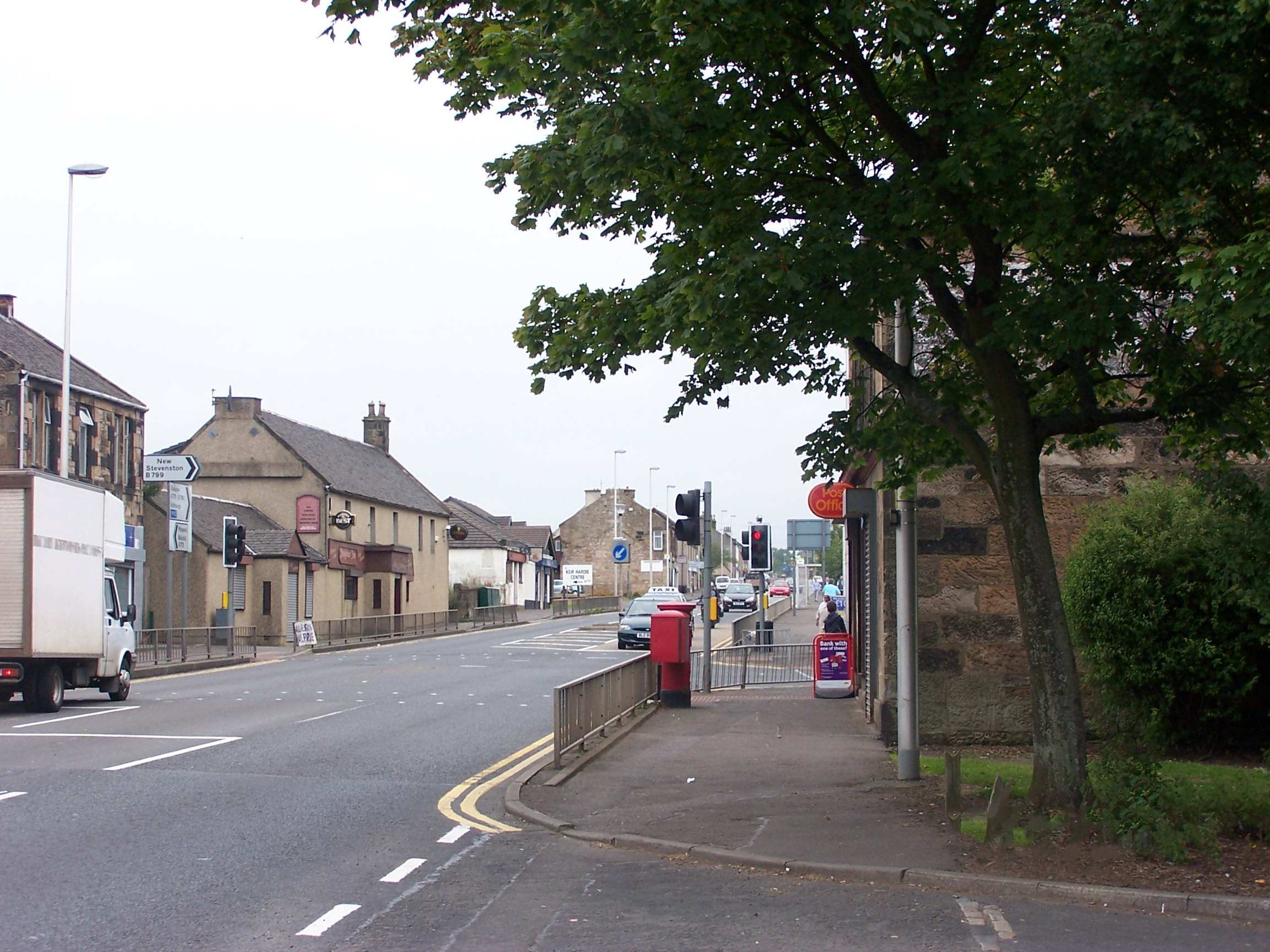
- Main Street, Holytown

- Location within North Lanarkshire
- Area: 5.35 km^{2} (2.07 sq mi)
- Population: 5,100 (2020)
  - Density: 953/km^{2} (2,470/sq mi)
- OS grid reference: NS766606
- Council area: North Lanarkshire
- Lieutenancy area: Lanarkshire
- Country: Scotland
- Sovereign state: United Kingdom
- Post town: Motherwell
- Postcode district: ML1 4
- Dialling code: 01698
- Police: Scotland
- Fire: Scottish
- Ambulance: Scottish
- UK Parliament: Airdrie and Shotts
- Scottish Parliament: Uddingston and Bellshill

Holytown is a village situated to the east of Bellshill and north of Motherwell in North Lanarkshire, Scotland. Most local amenities are shared with the adjacent villages of Carfin, Newarthill and New Stevenston which have a combined population of around 20,000 across the four localities.

== History ==
The area grew on the back of the nearby coal mining industries in the 18th century. The roots of the town stretch back to at least the 17th Century, where records show that a meeting house was used for prayer services for the community. One old description of the town from the 19th century from the Ordnance Gazetteer of Scotland by Francis H. Groome, 1885 is as follows:

Holytown, a town in Bothwell parish, Lanarkshire, 1 mile [1.5 km] E by N of Holytown Junction on the Caledonian railway, 5 1/2 miles [9 km] SSE of Coatbridge, and 11 ESE of Glasgow. Surrounded by a well-worked part of the Lanarkshire mineral-field, and partaking largely in the industry and traffic connected with the working of the same, it experienced considerable increase of prosperity from the opening of the Cleland and Midcalder railway (1866), in result partly of through traffic on that line and partly of junction-communication with Motherwell.
It includes the suburb of New Stevenston, 1/2 mile [800 m] SSW; and has a post office, with money order, savings' bank, and telegraph departments, a branch of the Clydesdale Bank, 3 insurance agencies, gasworks, a quoad sacra parish church, a Free church, and has 2 public schools. The quoad sacra parish is in the presbytery of Hamilton and synod of Glasgow and Ayr; its minister's stipend is £120.
Pop. of town
(1836) 755,
(1861) 1135,
(1871) 2197,
(1881) 2480, of whom 1048 were in New Stevenston;
of q. s. parish
(1871) 10,099,
(1881) 10,449.—Ord. Sur., sh. 31, 1867.

Reports of living conditions showed that the residents of the town lived in tough conditions in the 19th century. In 1913, one report describing housing in Jerviston Square said that the housing "may be taken as an example of houses that are very near the border line of the habitable standard".

Mining work was a dangerous life with long hours and accidents resulting in death were not uncommon in Lanarkshire. Life was harsh, but forged the character of the working class mining community in the face of hardship, especially the politics of Keir Hardie, the founder of the Labour Party in the UK.

The Holytown Miners' Association was a local union formed in the 1840s. In 1847 the union attempted to restrict output, to combat a 1s (5p) per day wage reduction proposed by the owners. The owners imposed a 3-month 'lockout', which ended in defeat for the union. In 1855 the union merged with the Scottish Coal and Iron-stone Miners' Protective Association. According to the Board of Trade Reports there was another Association of the same name formed in the early 1890s. With an estimated membership of 200 for both 1894 and 1895 it became a branch of the Lanarkshire Miners' County Union in 1896.

Many have drifted away since the early 1990s due to the decline in the coal industries. The bulk of people in the town are now employed in blue-collar roles, including manufacturing and retail. The establishment nearby of the EuroTerminal hi-tech industrial estate in the 1990s did not bring a huge boom in jobs as expected. Other well-known local employers include Honeywell, a large electronics firm based in the Newhouse industrial estate.

Notable people from Holytown include the politician Keir Hardie, the Rt Rev Dr Shaw Paterson (Moderator of the General Assembly of the Church of Scotland 2024-2025), World War I nurse Jean Aitken Bell, who won medals for having served in Serbia and the footballers Harry McShane and Matt Balunas. Holytown was also the birthplace of James Williamson, noted Scottish civil engineer involved with many of the Hydro-electric power schemes of the 1930-1950s.

== Description ==
The population of Holytown was 5,483 (2001 Census); the town is approximately 422 hectares (2001 Census) in size. There are five or six public houses and two primary schools as well as two main places of worship.

The main backbone of the town is Main Street, which stretches across the north of the town from east to west upon which are the numerous shops and pubs. The town has lost various services with Clydesdale Bank having moved out of the town (the premises are now a dentists) whilst certain other services such as the petrol station closed around the late 1970s. There is no longer a Post Office (with the premises most recently occupied by a desserts store), the nearest such services are located in New Stevenston and Bellshill. The video shops that were in the town closed in the mid-1990s. Hairdressers and barber shops, and a vets still ply their trade in the town.

For general shopping most go to the nearest local towns, especially Bellshill. Motherwell and Hamilton are used for clothes and gifts shopping with their larger shopping centres, or for a big day out families head into Glasgow which is convenient to reach with the M8 motorway and public transport.

The community centre is used for various activities all year round, for dances and larger get-togethers. As of September 2009, the future of Holytown Community Centre is under threat of closure by North Lanarkshire Council although residents intend to fight for the Centre to remain open.

A halal butchers was opened in the late 1990s to help cater for the Muslims in the districts.

Holytown railway station (which is actually located in New Stevenston) has a direct link into Glasgow and Edinburgh and the approximate time from Holytown to Glasgow is 20–30 minutes by car or train, and 45 minutes to Edinburgh. The station (opened in 1869) is not conveniently located for many Holytown residents, so buses into Motherwell or to Glasgow (or even a bus to Motherwell for the train to Glasgow) is a more usual choice.

A sports centre was built in the early 1990s and named "The Keir Hardie Leisure Centre" in honour of local hero James Keir Hardie. The Centre's gym (two rooms) and indoor 5-a-side football pitch are regularly used.

In 1976, the Michael Sherry Senior Citizen Centre was built for use by the senior citizens in the immediate area. It has been in continual use since, and is primarily used by the senior citizens but also by the community a like. Activities taking place include, lunch clubs, dance classes, craft classes, bowling clubs, bingo nights, church activities, community councils and MSP surgeries.

In the 2010s, a large new housing development, Torrance Park (featuring an adjacent 18-hole golf course of the same name, designed by Dave Thomas) was established to the south-east of the village, off the main road to Newarthill. Although referred to as Holytown in documentation, the development shares the ML1 5 postcode with Newarthill and is counted alongside that town in some statistics.

== Religion ==
Holytown Parish Church

The town is historically Protestant (Presbyterian/Church of Scotland), and the character of the town remains so. On the far east of the town on Edinburgh Road stands Holytown Parish Church, possibly the oldest building in the town which is still used on a daily basis. The original church was founded in the 17th century which helped to set the roots of the town. The current building was built and opened in 1837.

There is also a thriving community of people of Irish Catholic descent, who have long set up a Roman Catholic school with a church in the town, Christ the King Church. The church and the school are both on the main street. The church was founded 1975 on the site of the public primary school which had moved to a new building.

A small number of Muslims began to move to Lanarkshire in the late 1960s, and a few families of Pakistani origin moved to Holytown in the 1970s. For prayers, a room above one of the shops on the main street (across from the Christ the King Church) was used as a small makeshift mosque for Muslims throughout Lanarkshire during the early to mid-1980s (the mosque was the first in Lanarkshire) before it moved to Carfin. In those days, for Eid (Islam's holiest religious annual day), Christ the King Church on the main street used to help and provide their halls to the small Lanarkshire Muslim community for use for the day. In the mid-1980s, the initial group of people who formed the mosque (led by Ghulam Saqlain Siddiquie who was a long-time resident in Holytown) formed the Lanarkshire Muslim Welfare Society. Ghulam Saqlain Siddiquie was awarded an MBE in January 2014 for his work in creating racial harmony over more than 30 years. Since the mid-1990s there has been a halal butchers to cater for the area.

== Football ==
The town has had its own teams representing the area, as listed below. There are still various small amateur teams playing in local regional leagues at all ages representing the community.

| Team name | Formed | Disbanded | Notes | Ground |
|---|---|---|---|---|
| Holytown | 1879 | 1884 | Lost 2–0 to Wishaw in the first round of the 1882–83 Scottish Cup | Townhead Park |
| Holytown | 1888 | 1889 | | |
| Holytown Pilgrims | 1908 | 1911 | previously amateurs *-1909 | |
| Holytown Primrose | * | * | | |
| Holytown Thistle | 1889 | 1906 | | Howden Park |
| Holytown United | 1936 | 1953 | previously Juveniles *-1937 | Thankerton Park |

One notable footballer from Holytown was Harry McShane (1920–2012) who won the Football League First Division in England with Manchester United in 1951–52 and then played for various clubs in and around the north-west of England. He was the father of the British TV actor Ian McShane.

Alex McSpadyen (1914–1978) played for Holytown United, Partick Thistle and Portadown, and was capped twice for Scotland (v Hungary 1938, v England 1939) and also won one wartime cap (v Irish XI), plus three caps for the Scottish League XI. He was born on Main Street in Holytown, and on after playing for Portadown, he returned to the town and was appointed trainer to Holytown United until the club folded a year later.

Johnny Murdoch (1901–1964) was born in Holytown. He played for Kirkintilloch Rob Roy, Airdrieonians, Motherwell, Dundee, Dunfermline Athletic and Stewarts & Lloyds. Airdrie gave him a benefit match in 1927 v Rangers. He won one Scotland cap, a 0–0 draw v Ireland in 1931. He won the Scottish Football League with Motherwell (1931–32) and played in two Scottish Cup finals, both lost to Celtic, in 1931 and 1933. He later moved to Corby and opened up a newsagents.

John Reid was a member of parliament for the local constituency. On 28 September 2007 it was announced that he would become Chairman of Celtic Football Club. Reid, a lifelong supporter of the club, described the appointment as the next best thing to playing for his heroes.

Eddie Pearson (1863–1918), born in Holytown, played for Celtic FC in their inaugural match on 28 May 1888.

Tom Cowan was from Holytown, and played in the Holytown Colts side that won the 1981 Under-13 Scottish Cup against Celtic Boys Club. He went on to play in the senior professional game for a number of clubs as a defender including most notably Rangers, Sheffield United and Stoke City, but spent the bulk of his time at Huddersfield Town, Cambridge United and Carlisle United. He was player of the year twice at Huddersfield.

Matt Balunas (1918–2006), born in Holytown, played for Third Lanark over 200 times. He was a member of North Lanarkshire's Lithuanian immigrant community.

Nowadays, Holytown Colts are the only football team from Holytown, though they exist only at boys club and amateur levels.

== War memorial ==
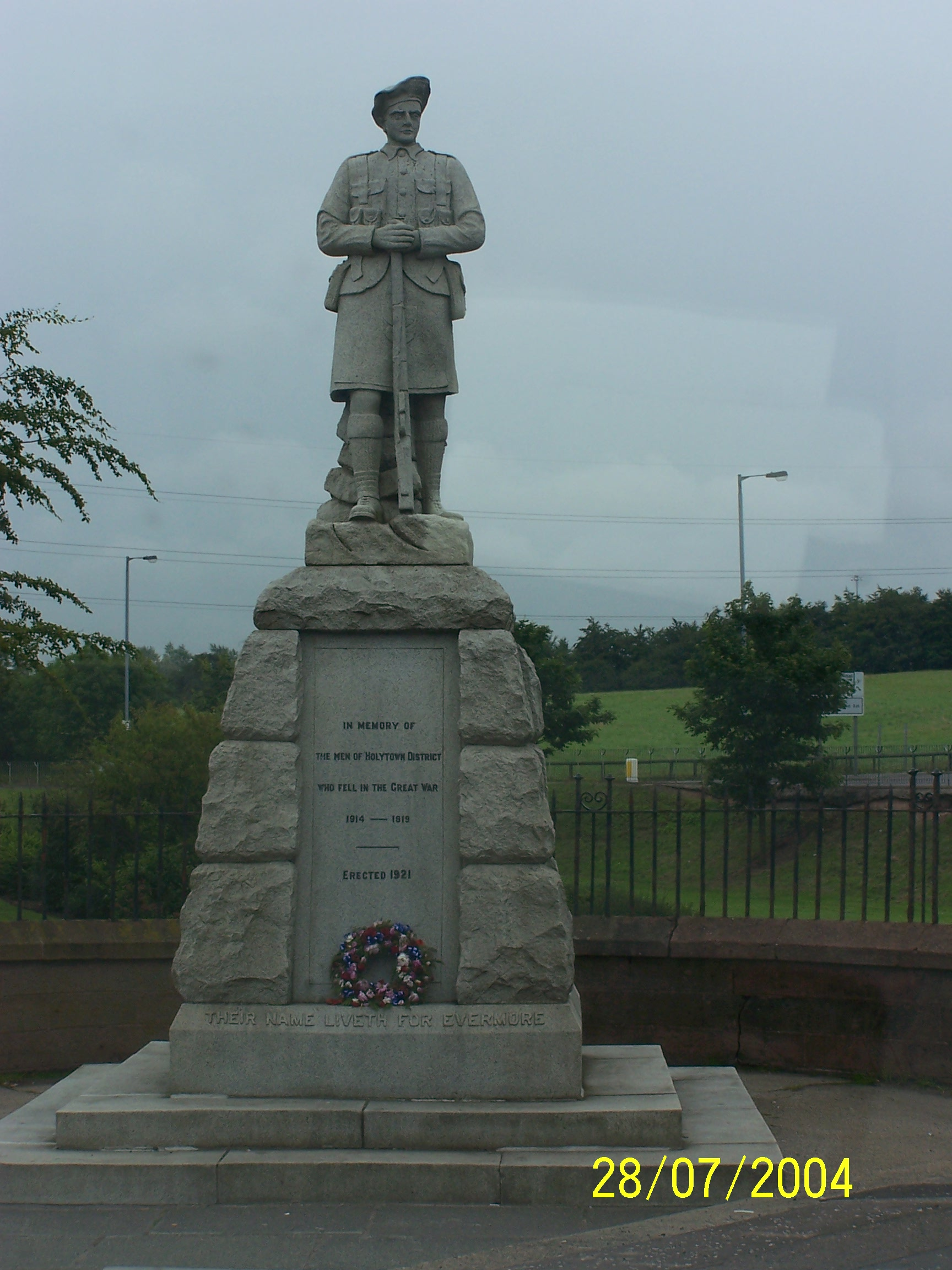
The War Memorial statue for those from the small town of Holytown (Scotland) who died in World War I.

The inscription on the statue says:

"In Memory of the Men of Holytown District who fell in the Great War 1914 - 1918".

and on the lower plinth it says:

"Their name liveth for evermore".

The statue is made of granite, measures 16 by 8 by 8 feet (5 m × 2.5 m × 2.5 m), and is of a life-sized kilted soldier bearing full uniform, on a tapering plinth stepped base.

The statue was built by Scott & Rae (Sculptors) and James Paterson (Builder), and was unveiled by Alexander Whitelaw on 9 October 1921 with a dedication by Rev JD Dykes. The cost of the memorial was £1160 which was funded by public, private and corporate donations.

Currently (October 2009) building work is underway to restore the war memorial to its former glory. Plans include a new surrounding and properly landscaped memorial gardens.

== Politics ==
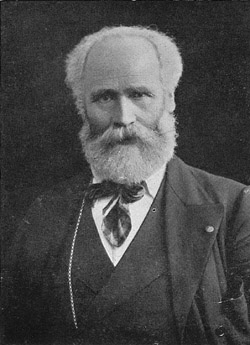
James Keir Hardie, founder of the Labour Party in the UK

Holytown's biggest claim in its history is undoubtedly being the home of James Keir Hardie (more commonly referred to as simply "Keir Hardie"), founder of the Labour Party in Britain. He was born in the hamlet of Legbrannock in 1856, which is now in the Holytown area, and his old home/cottage has been preserved for future generations ("the Keir Hardie Cottage"). In honour of the great man, a street in the town is named after him ("Keir Hardie Avenue") as is the local sports centre ("The Keir Hardie Leisure Centre"). His name is still a focal point for pride and respect for the town and its people.

Since the time of Keir Hardie the town has been a Labour Party up until SNP gained control in 2015. In the 2014 Scottish Independence Referendum, North Lanarkshire, of which Holytown forms part, voted narrowly in favour of independence.

The town now lies in the Hamilton North and Bellshill constituency for the House of Commons (Parliament) and Scottish Parliament (previously in Motherwell and Wishaw), with Michael McMahon as the local MSP (Member for Scottish Parliament) winning the seat with a 19.2% majority in 2007.

A previous MP for the town was John Reid MP, who went on to serve in various high level positions in government including Home Secretary and Leader of House of Commons.

The current MP is Neil Gray, who was first elected in 2015 for the Scottish National Party, replacing Pamela Nash of The Labour Party. This is the first time in many generations that the town has not been represented in parliament by a Labour Party MP.

Robert Crosser was born in Holytown in 1874, and was a Congressman in the US government for 38 years. His family emigrated when he was still a child in 1881 to the USA, where he was educated and made his way through university, law and the US government. A Democrat, he gained senior positions in government. Crosser suffered from arthritis, and used a wheelchair from 1934 onwards. He died in Cleveland in 1957 and was buried in Highland Park Cemetery in the US.
