= Millhall =

Coordinates: 55.7331°N 4.2561°W

- Location within Scotland Millhall (South Lanarkshire) Millhall (Scotland)
- Population: less than 50
  - Edinburgh: 44 mi (71 km) ENE
  - London: 337 mi (542 km) SSE
- Lieutenancy area: Renfrewshire
- Country: Scotland
- Sovereign state: United Kingdom
- Post town: GLASGOW
- Postcode district: G76
- Dialling code: 0141
- Police: Scotland
- Fire: Scottish
- Ambulance: Scottish
- UK Parliament: East Renfrewshire
- Scottish Parliament: Eastwood

Millhall is a hamlet in East Renfrewshire, in the Central Lowlands of Scotland. It lies 0.8 miles (1.3 km) southeast of Eaglesham, 8.3 miles (13.4 km) northwest of Strathaven and 3.6 miles (5.8 km) southwest of East Kilbride.

Polnoon Castle, a scheduled monument, is in Millhall.

== History ==
Millhall is a small hamlet. The historic Polnoon Bridge is in the area, as well as an old mill and a few farms.

== Governance ==
Millhall is in East Renfrewshire, one of the 32 council areas of Scotland for local government purposes. East Renfrewshire Council, the unitary local council, is based in nearby Giffnock and is the body responsible for local governance. For local electoral purposes, Millhall is in the Eaglesham, Waterfoot and Newton Mearns South ward.

The Scottish Parliament is responsible for devolved matters such as education, health and justice, while reserved matters are dealt with by the Parliament of the United Kingdom. Millhall forms part of the county constituency of East Renfrewshire, electing one member of parliament (MP) to the House of Commons of the Parliament of the United Kingdom. Kirsten Oswald of the SNP was elected as MP for East Renfrewshire in the 2019 general election. Before the constituency's creation in 2005, Millhall was in the Eastwood Constituency. For the purposes of the Scottish Parliament, Millhall forms part of the Eastwood constituency, which is represented in the Scottish Government by Jackson Carlaw MSP, of the Conservative party.

== Geography ==
Paisley

Climate chart (precipitation, max. and min. temperature)
J	F	M	A	M	J	J	A	S	O	N	D
148 7 2	105 7 2	112 10 3	64 13 5	68 16 7	66 18 10	73 20 12	93 19 12	113 16 10	143 13 7	126 9 4	135 7 2
- █ Average max. and min. temperatures in °C
- █ Precipitation totals in mm
- Source: Met Office
Imperial conversion
J	F	M	A	M	J	J	A	S	O	N	D
5.8 44 35	4.1 45 35	4.4 49 37	2.5 55 41	2.7 61 45	2.6 65 50	2.9 67 54	3.6 67 53	4.4 62 49	5.6 55 44	5 49 39	5.3 44 35
- █ Average max. and min. temperatures in °F
- █ Precipitation totals in inches

Millhall experiences a temperate maritime climate, like much of the British Isles, with relatively cool summers and mild winters. Regular but generally light precipitation occurs throughout the year.

Millhall within the post town of Glasgow in the G postcode area. Millhall is a part of postcode district G76, which also includes neighbouring settlements Clarkston, Busby, Carmunnock, Eaglesham and Waterfoot, and small parts of East Kilbride.

== Transport ==
The hamlet lies on the main road between Eaglesham, Auldhouse, and Strathaven. It is 0.8 miles from Eaglesham, and in Eaglesham there are bus services. The nearest railway station to Millhall is Hairmyres railway station. The buses from Eaglesham go to the railway station. The nearest motorway is the M77, of which Junction 4 at Newton Mearns and Junction 5, also at Newton Mearns are the main junctions for Millhall.

Millhall lies within the Strathclyde Partnership for Transport Passenger transport executive.

The nearest airport is Glasgow Airport, 11 miles (17.7 km) northwest of Millhall.

== Public services ==
Millhall forms part of the Western water and sewerage regions of Scotland. Waste management is provided by the East Renfrewshire local council. Water supplies are provided by Scottish Water, a government-owned corporation of the Scottish Government. Millhall's distribution network operator for electricity is Scottish Power. The NHS board is NHS Greater Glasgow and Clyde. The Scottish Fire and Rescue Service is the statutory fire and rescue service and has a fire station based in nearby Clarkston.

Policing in Millhall is provided by Police Scotland. The Strathclyde Partnership for Transport, a public body in Scotland, has direct operational responsibilities. Transport Scotland manages the local rail network.

== Sources ==
- Nisbet, Douglas (2007). Old Clarkston and Netherlee. Catrine: Stenlake.
- Butt, R. V. J. (October 1995). The Directory of Railway Stations: details every public and private passenger station, halt, platform and stopping place, past and present (1st ed.). Sparkford: Patrick Stephens Ltd. ISBN 978-1-85260-508-7. OCLC 60251199. OL 11956311M.
