= Polnoon Castle =

14th-century castle in Scotland

- Eaglesham, East Renfrewshire, Scotland; UK grid reference NS58505132
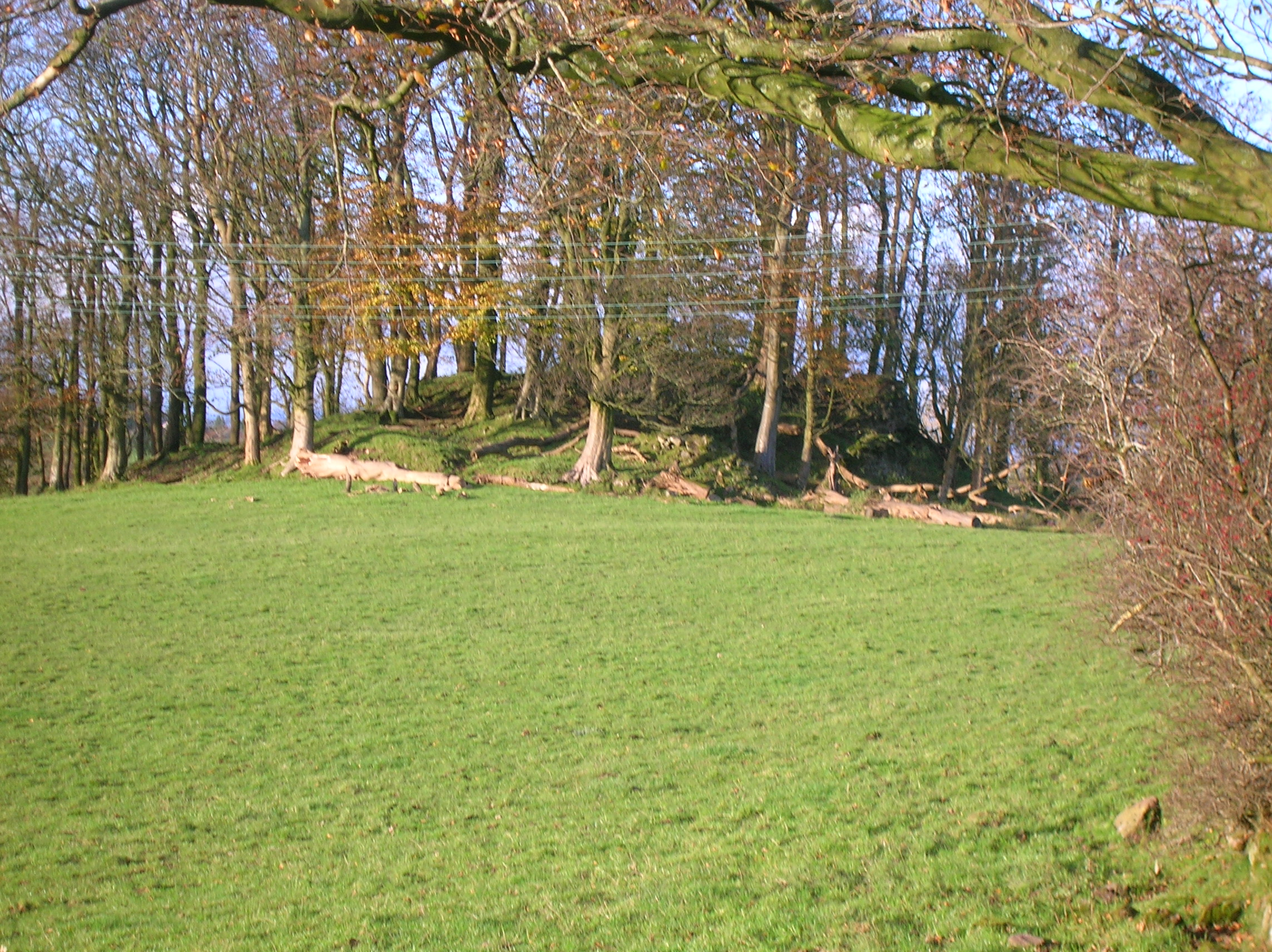
- Polnoon Castle mound

Site information
- Type: Tower
- Owner: Polnoon Farm
- Controlled by: Montgomery clan
- Open to the public: Private
- Condition: Significant rubble remains

Location
- Shown within Scotland
- Location within Scotland
- Coordinates: 55.7346°N 4.2551°W

Site history
- Built: 14th century
- Built by: Sir John Montgomery
- In use: Until 17th century
- Materials: stone

Polnoon Castle was a 14th-century fortification located on a motte beside the Polnoon Water in Millhall, in the Parish of Eaglesham, East Renfrewshire, Scotland.

== The Montgomerys of Eaglesham ==
The Barony of Eaglesham (1158, Egilsham; 1309, Eglishame) formed part of the grant made by David I (1124–53) to Walter fitz Alan, the founder of the house of Stewart. Eaglesham may well have come into the possession of the Montgomery family during Walter's floruit, since the family were certainly lairds of Eaglesham at a later date, and a certain Robert of Montgomery was one of Walter's prominent tenants.

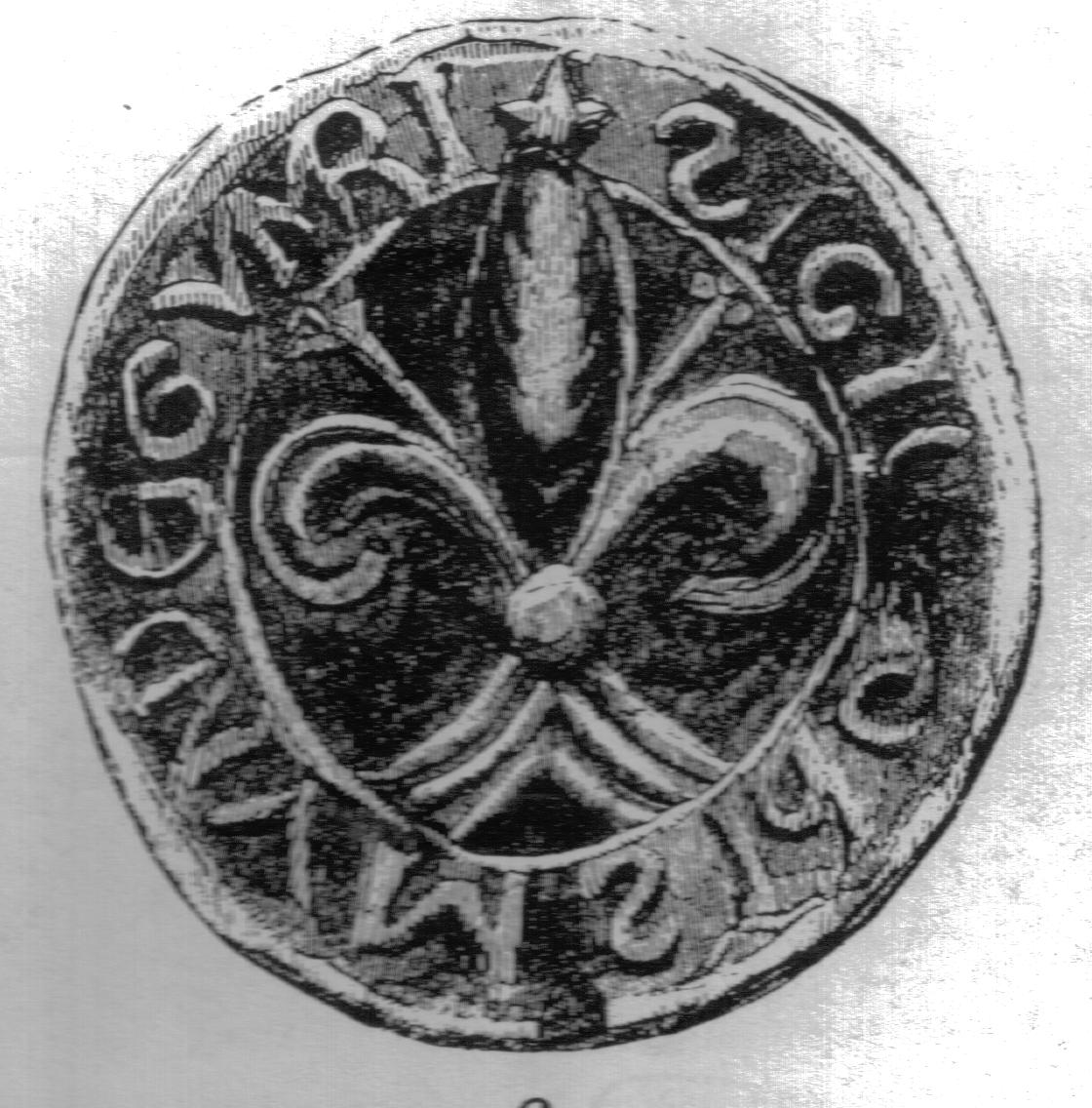
The circa 1170 seal of John Montgomery of Eaglesham.

Robert, likely an ancestor of the later Montgomerys family, appears as a witness in a charter to Monastery of Paisley around 1160.

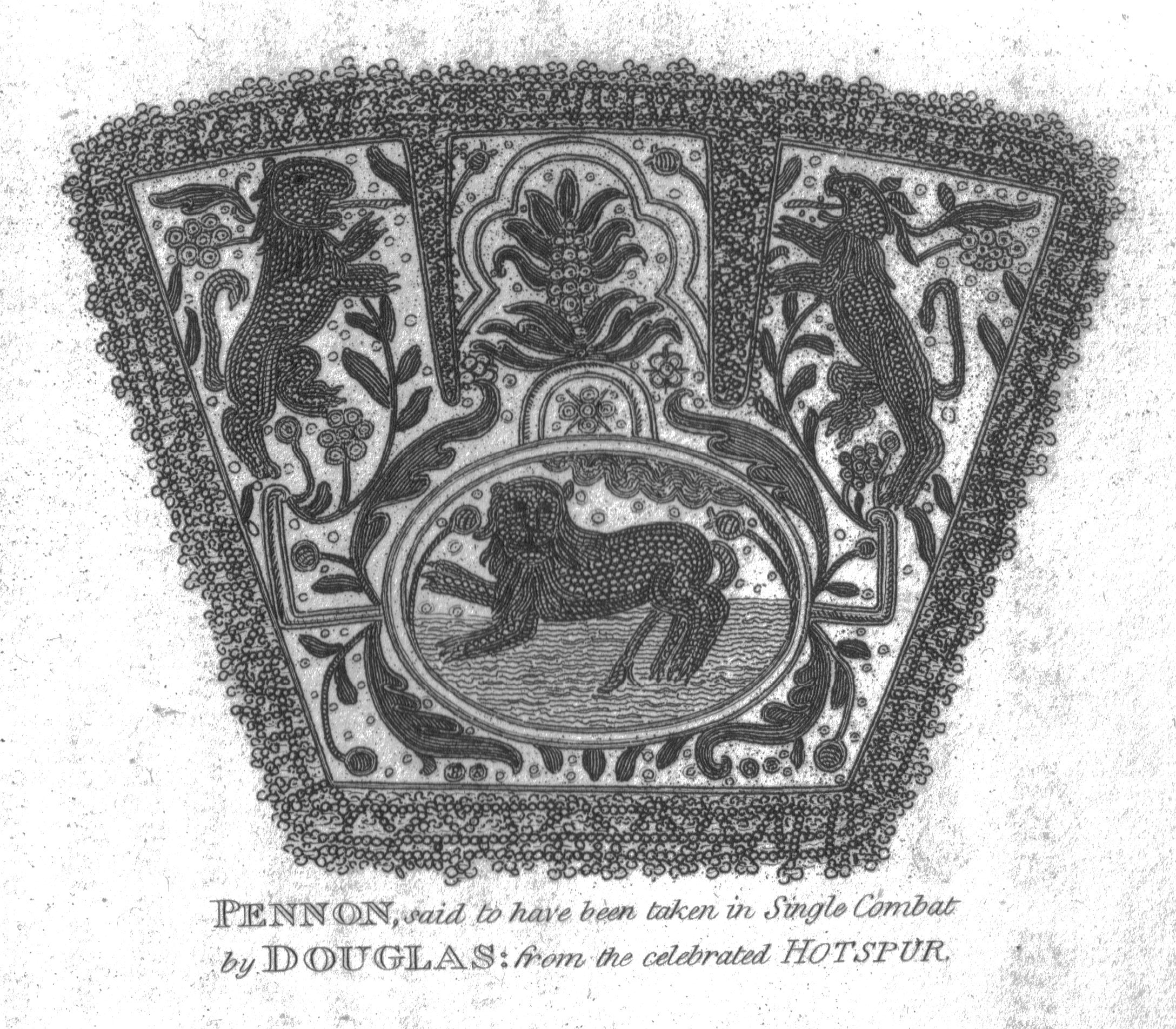
The pennon of Sir Henry Percy as first captured by James Douglas, Earl of Douglas and later taken by Sir John Montgomery. (See Eglinton Tournament of 1839)

John de Montgomery and his brother are listed on the Ragman Roll, rendering homage to Edward I of England for their estates in 1296. A later Sir John, the ninth Laird or Baron of Eaglesham, was one of the heroes of the Battle of Otterburn in 1388, capturing Sir Henry Percy, nicknamed 'Hotspur' in single combat and holding him ransom. Sir John's mother was a Douglas and a long term feud had existed between the Percy and Douglas families.

Ransoming important captives was the custom in the 14th century and Sir John used the money paid over by the English for the release of Hotspur to build himself a fine castle at Polnoon. It is said that following the chivalrous treatment of his captive, Sir John gained the lasting friendship and admiration of Sir Henry Percy and that he may have even assisted in the technical design and construction of the fortifications.

The ballad of the 'Battle of Otterburne' commemorates the events of 1388 that led to these developments:

The Percy and Montgomerie met,
Of other they were richt fain,
They swakked swords until they swat,
And their red blude ran between.

Yield thee, yield thee, Percy, he said,
Or I swear I’ll lay thee low!
To whom shall I yield, said Earl Percy,
Since I see that it maim be so?

As soon as he knew it was Montgomerie,
He stuck his sword-point in the ground;
But the Montgomerie was a courteous knight,
And quickly took him by the hand.

Sir Hugh Montgomery, the son of this Sir John, was slain at the Battle of Otterburn by an arrow fired by an English archer as recorded in The Ballad of Chevy Chase:

He had a bow bent in his hand,
Made of a trusty tree:
An arrow of a clothyard long
Up to the head drew he:

Against Sir Hugh Montgomerie
So right the shaft he set,
The gray goose-wing that was thereon,
In his heart-blood was wet.

Hugh's body was carried to Edinburgh Castle, together with the trophies of Percy's spear and pennon. These have remained with the Montgomery family to the present day (2013). Hugh's body was taken for burial to his home lands and his coffin now lies in the Skelmorlie Aisle of Largs Old Kirk at Largs in North Ayrshire.

John, seventh baron of Eaglesham's daughter married Archibald Mure of Rowallan Castle and their great-grand-daughter Elizabeth married King Robert II.

In the fourteenth century the baronies of Eglinton and Ardrossan were obtained by the marriage in 1368 of John de Montgomery with Elizabeth, daughter and heiress of Sir Hugh Eglinton, by a half-sister (Robert and Egidia share the same father, but have different mothers), Egidia, of Robert II, King of Scotland.

=== The name ===
One suggestion is that the name Polnoon is a corruption of the old Scots word 'poinding', meaning a ransom, however the word 'Pol' may instead refer to a pool in a river, such as is present below Polnoon's site. Blaeu's map of circa 1654 records the castle as 'Pounuyn'. Punone is the name applied in a 19th-century Montgomery family history. Buchan has is as 'Punoon' in 1840.

=== The castle's position and layout ===
Illustrations of the castle are scarce, however John Ainslie's 1799 survey of the Eglinton Estates includes a vignette of the Polnoon Castle ruins. Timothy Pont's map as published by Johan Blaeu in 1654 illustrates Polnoon as a central single-storey house with a flanking building on each side, joined to the centre by a fence-like structure.

The motte lies about a mile south of Eaglesham church, sitting on a promontory with views of the surrounding countryside. The mound is rectangular, 30 by 22 m base, 18 by 10 m top, at least 4 m high and may have been built for an earlier castle of the Montgomerys, for the later structure encased the castle mound itself. The north-west corner of the tower, and the north range rise from the bedrock 3m below the base of the motte.

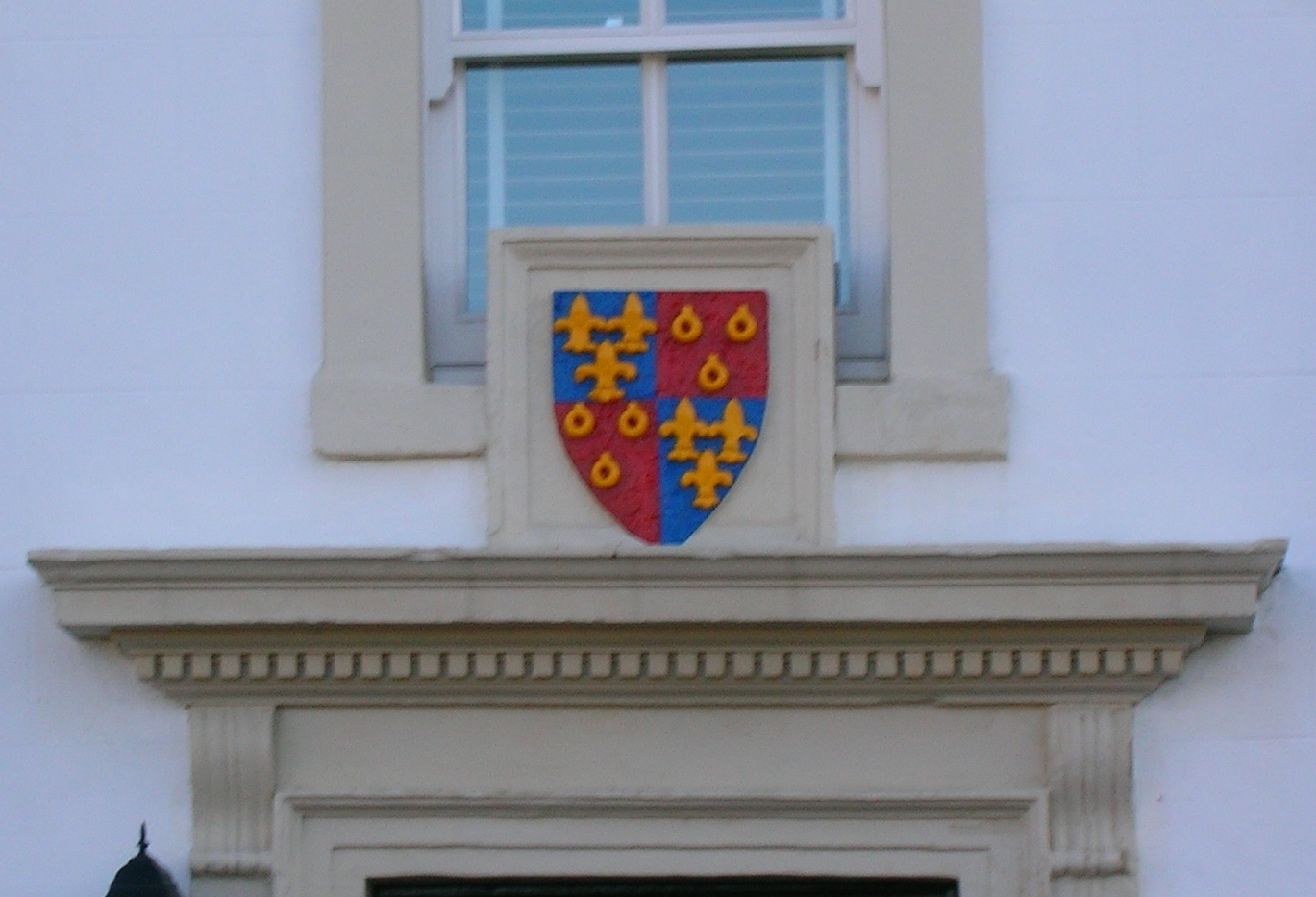
Montgomerie coat of arms at the old Cross Keys Inn on Montgomery Street

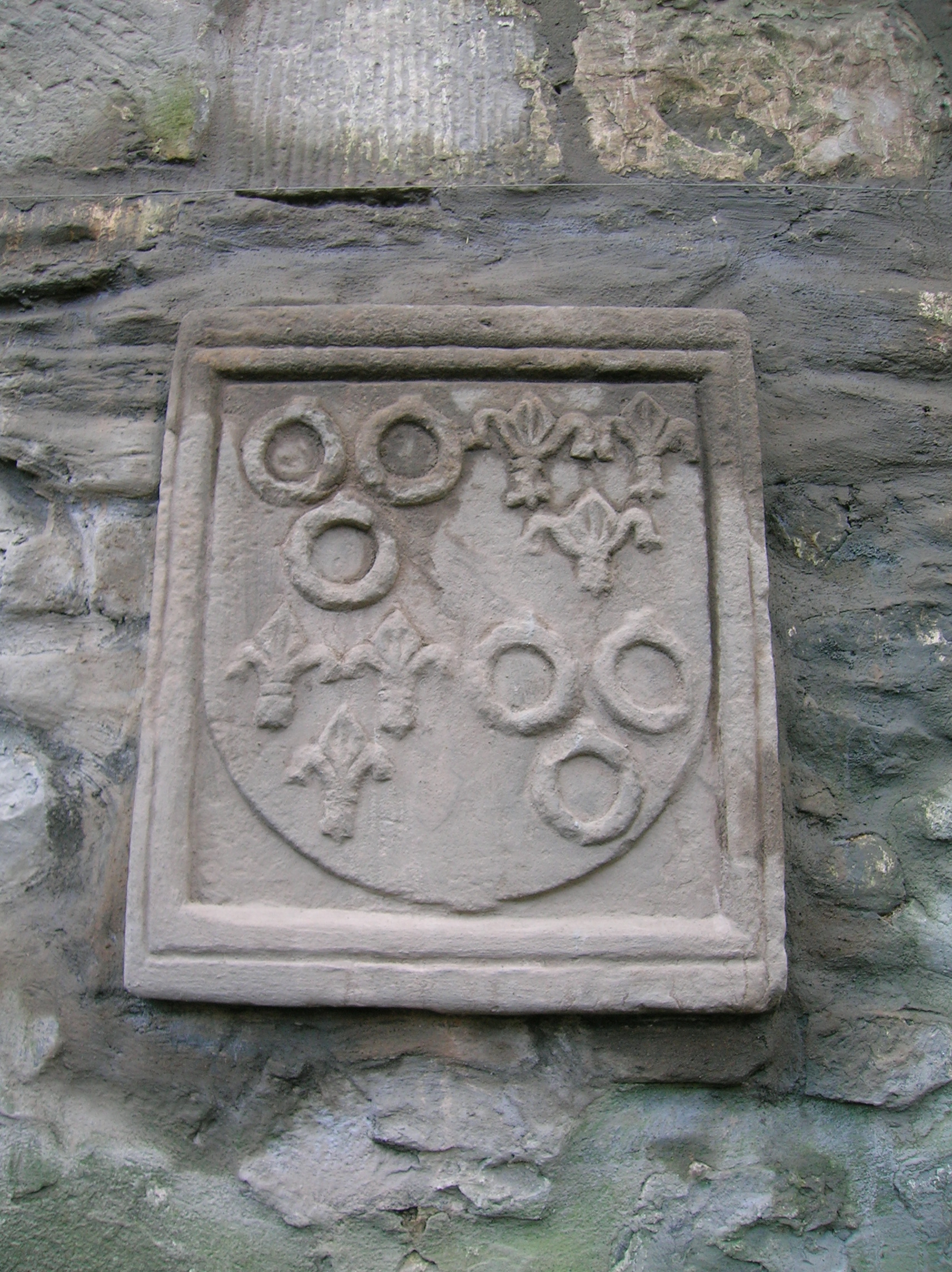
Eglinton Coat of Arms from Eglinton Castle

On the east side are indications of a ditch that ran across the promontory. The main entry to Polnoon may have been to the east of the enclosure as the range on the south extends in that direction. The castle remains do show signs of post-medieval use, possibly as a free-standing dwelling. There are traces of a battered plinth along the south wall.

MacGibbon & Ross record the castle name as 'Palnoon' and only refer to the site, describing it as strongly sited on the summit of a steep conical mound'...and ..'fragments on masonry here and there. Today (2009) large chunks of masonry appear almost randomly scattered across the site and in the Polnoon Water; very little remains in place as recognisable structures. On the west side, the ground falls steeply to the Polnoon Water, which forms a confluence with the White Cart nearby. There is no sign of a bailey or outworks on the east. The unusually chaotic condition of the masonry prevents any clear attempt at a plan of the ruins. At the northwest corner of the mound is the angle of what must have been a massive wall. At the base of the slopes at the southeast end is a stretch of walling 1.6 m thick, possibly part of a courtyard wall.

The 1764 coat of arms of the Montgomerys, Earls of Eglinton

It is related that Sir John Montgomery caused a spur (Hotspur) to be carved and placed above the door of the castle in memory of his exploits with Henry, Lord Percy.

==== The Armorial panel and other relics of the castle ====
The Montgomery armorial arms panel would have originally been set in a recess above the entrance to the castle, possibly placed there during the 17th century improvements; it was removed at some point and can now be seen above the door of the old Cross Keys Inn in Montgomery Street, Eaglesham. This coat of arms is a combination of the arms of the Montgomerie family (the fleurs-de-lis) and that of the Eglinton family (the signet rings or annulets). The armorial panel does not date from the marriage between the Montgomery and Eglinton families as shown by Sir John's seal which did not bear his wife's quartered arms; the only inclusion of the Eglinton family at this time was an annulet placed in the centre of the Montgomery shield bearing the fleur-de-lis. His son quartered the arms as shown in the illustrations. The quarter panels on the Eglinton Castle example are a mirror image of the standard Montgomerie coat of arms, the only other example noted of this arrangement is that to be found above the entrance and on the ceiling of the [[Skelmorlie Aisle|Skelmorlie Aisle of Largs Old Kirk]], belonging to Sir Robert Montgomerie, conjoined with those of his wife, Margaret Douglas. The reason for this heraldic arrangement is unknown; it may be a simple error as in the Stanecastle armorial panel which is upside down.

The old castle doors are recorded as being in the 'Edinburgh Museum', a stone from the castle bearing a Masonic symbol is in use as a gravestone in the churchyard and a piece of furniture is in the Glasgow Art Gallery.

In heraldic terms the full Montgomerie arms are described : Quarterly, 1st & 4th grand quarters, counterquartered, Azure three fleurs-de-lis Or (Montgomerie); & three annulets Or, stoned Azure (Eglinton); all within a bordure Or charged with a double tressureflory counterflory Gules;2nd & 3rd grand quarters, counterquartered, Or, three crescents within a double tressure flory counterflory Gules (Seton); Azure, three garbs Or (Buchan), overall an escutcheon parted per pale Gules and Azure, the dexter charged with a sword in pale Proper, pommelled and hilted Or, supporting an imperial crown, the sinister charged with star of twelve points Argent, all within a double tressure flory counterflory Gold.

Views at Polnoon Castle

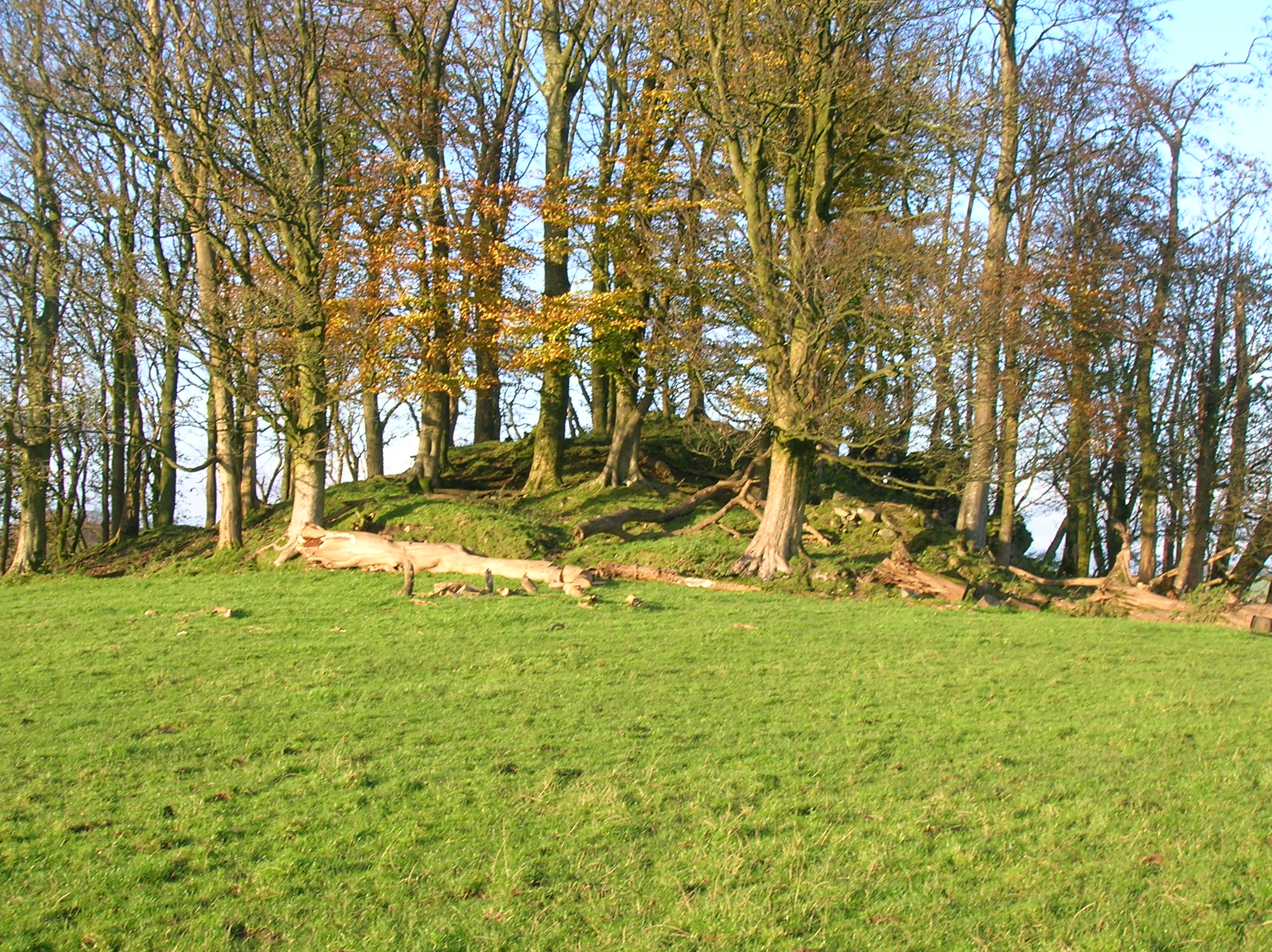
Polnoon Castle motte

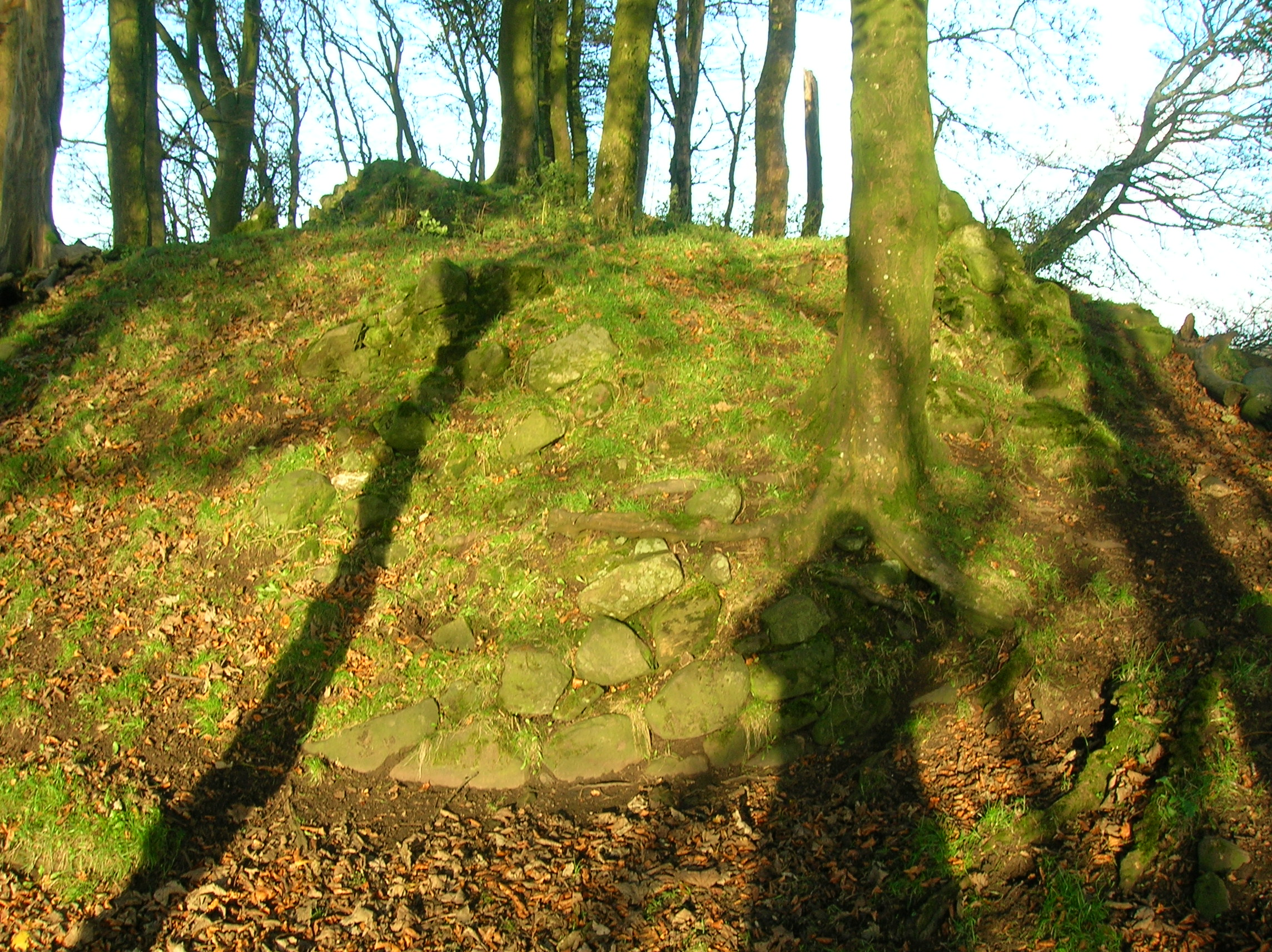
A masonry course still in situ

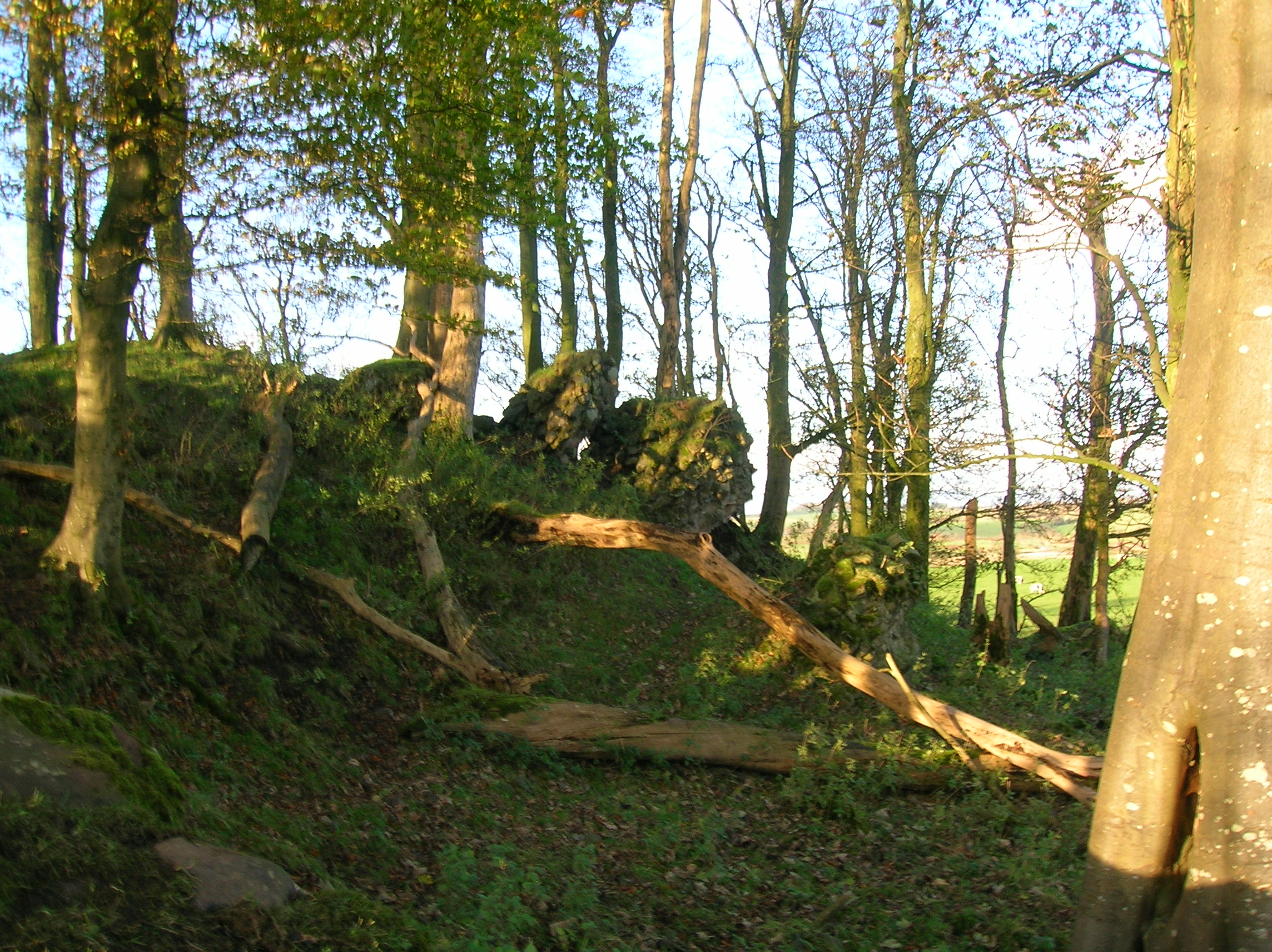
Masonry blocks

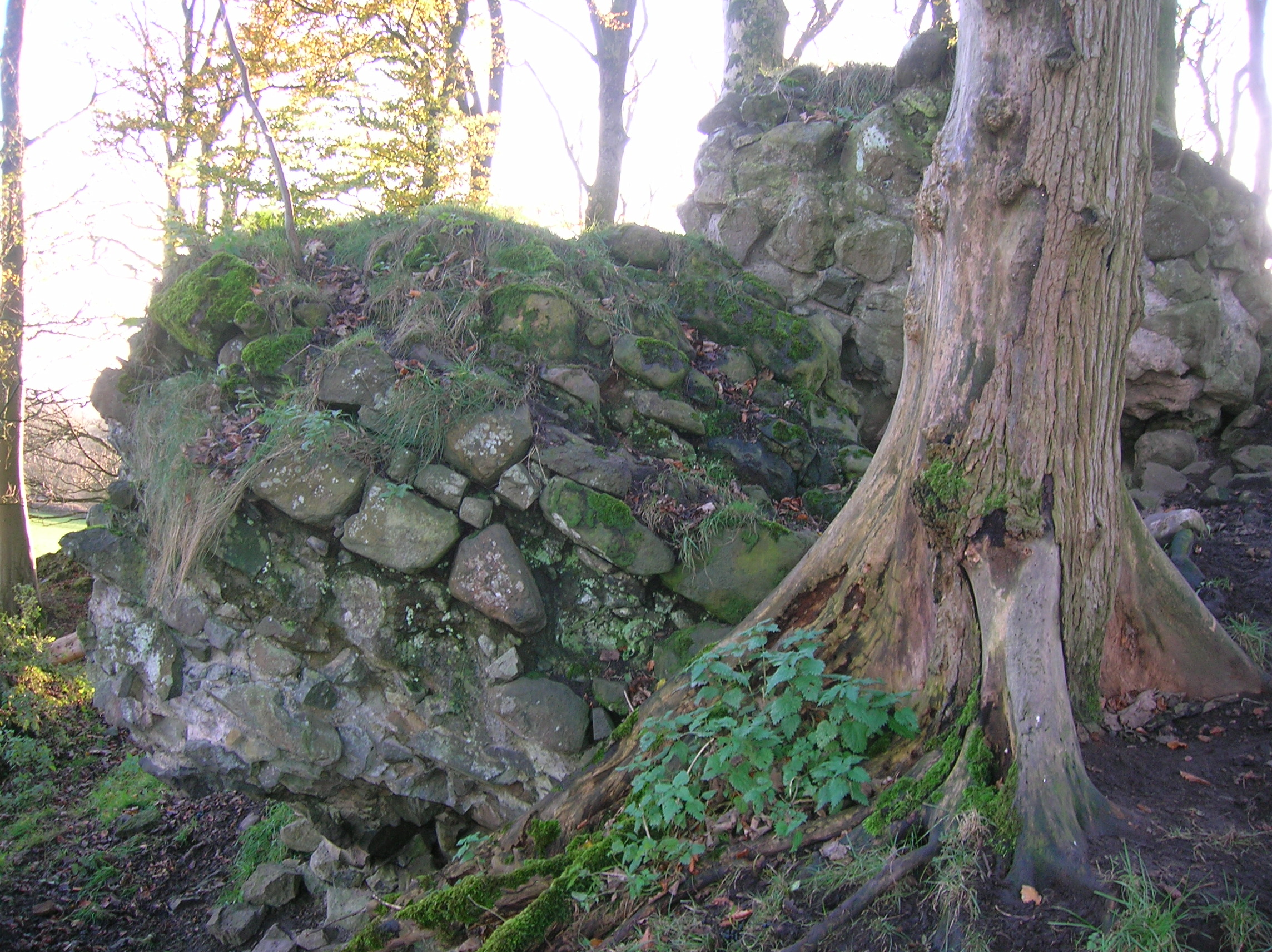
Large masonry block with mortar
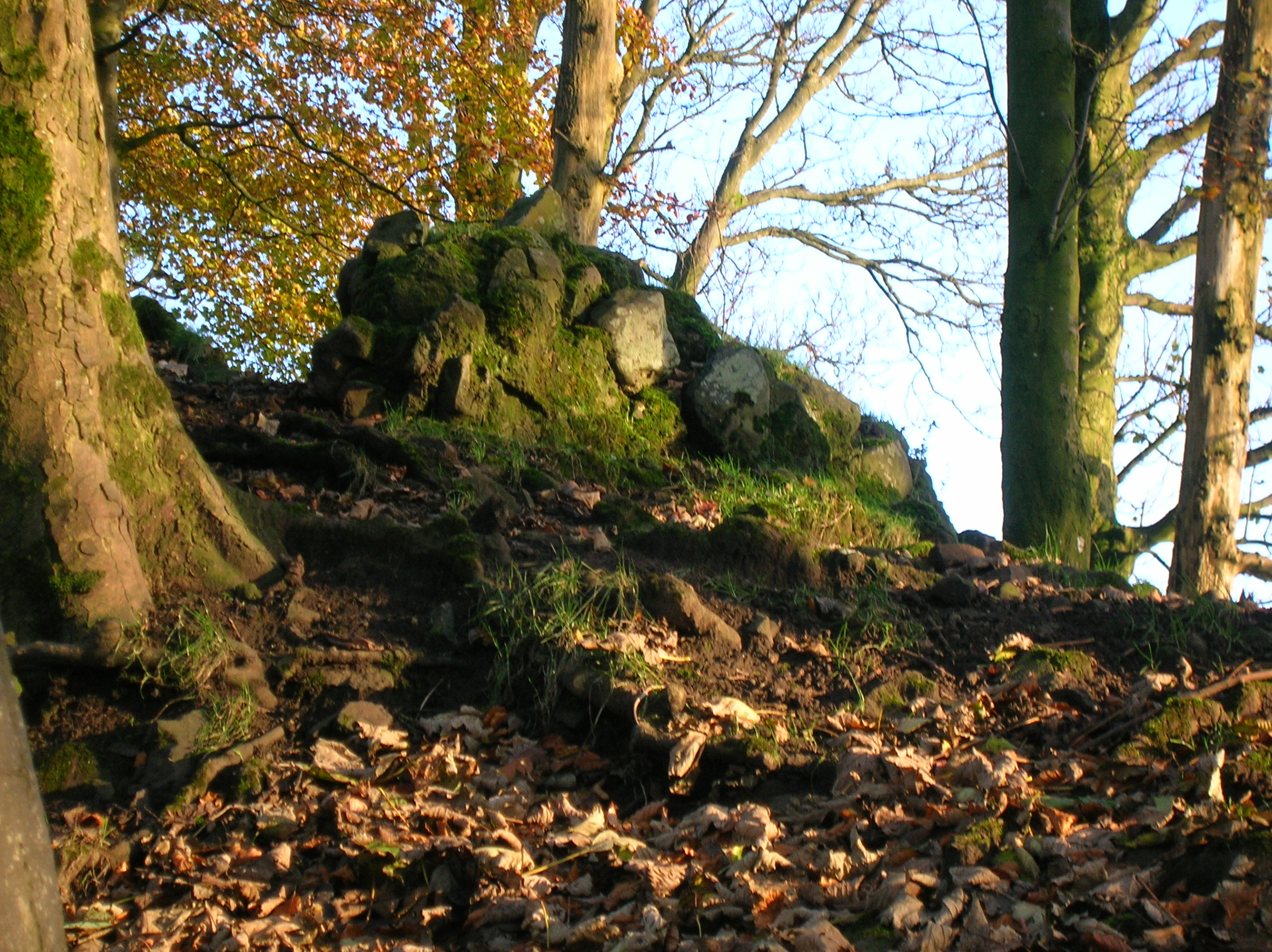
An isolated block

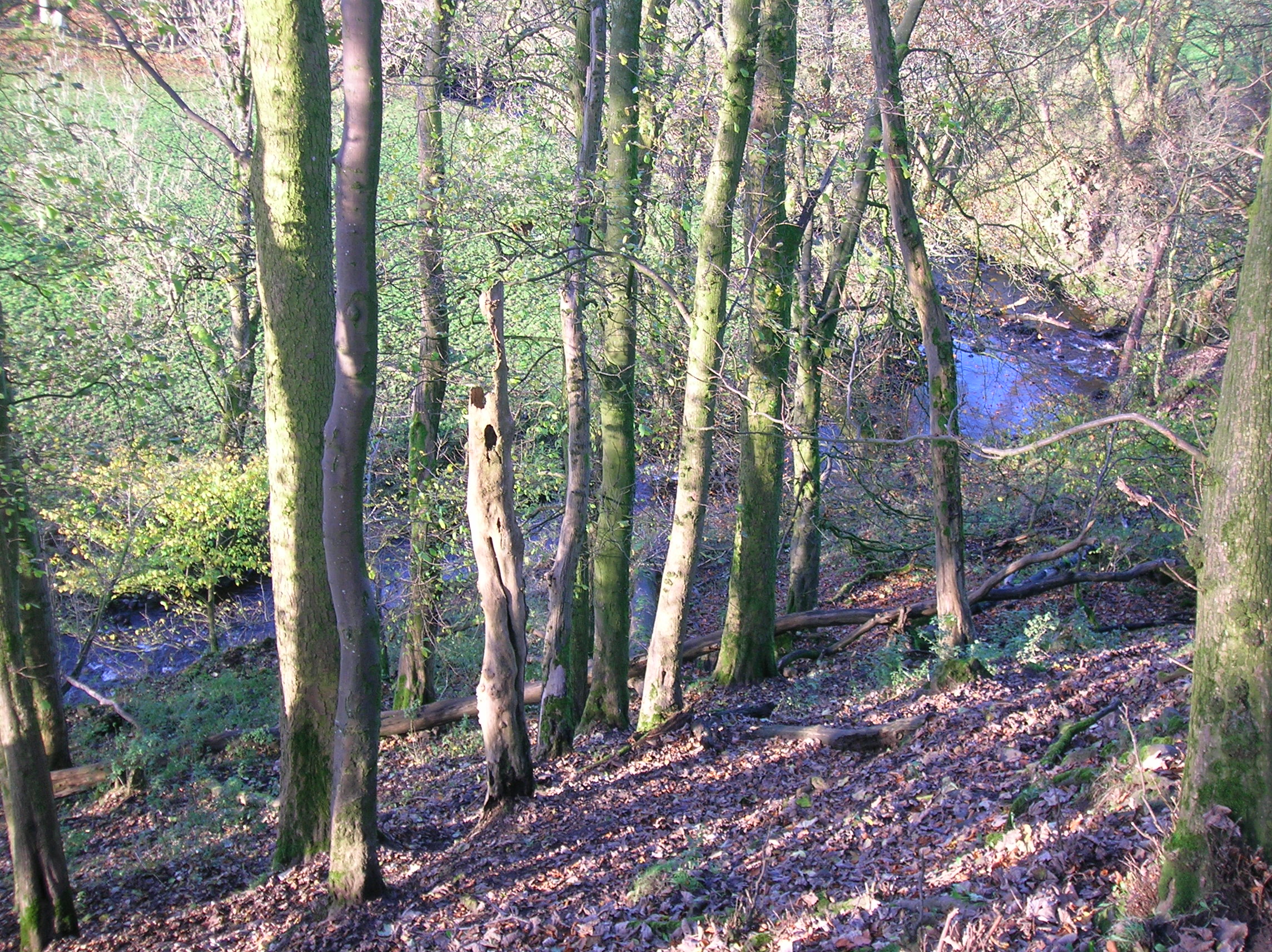
The Polnoon Burn from the motte

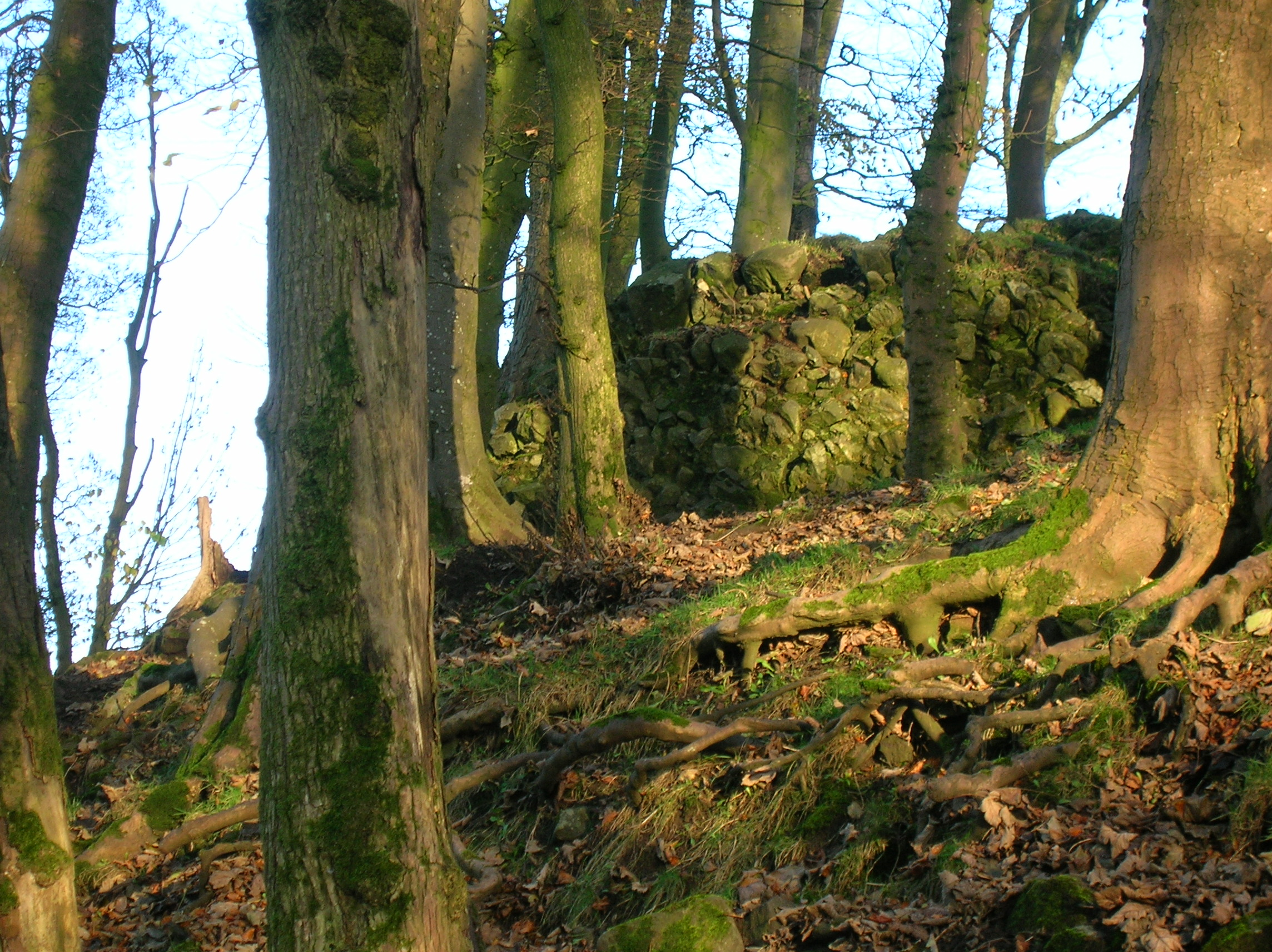
Polnoon Castle from below

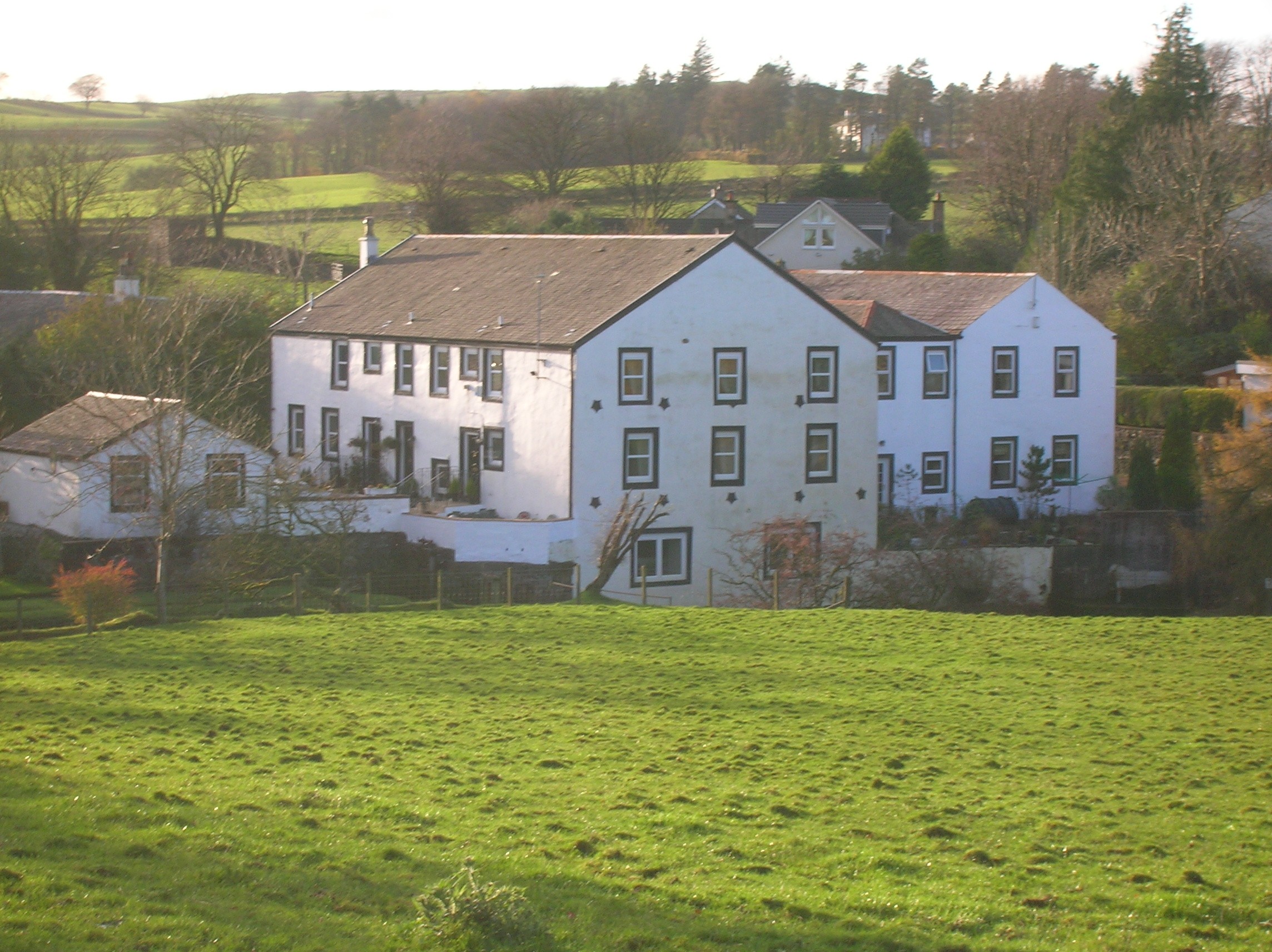
Millhall Mill from Polnoon Farm

== The murder of the 4th Earl of Eglinton ==
On 19 April 1586, Hugh, 4th earl, is said to have set out from Polnoon on a journey to Stirling, and whilst crossing the bridge over the Annick Water he was attacked by the lairds of Robertland, Aiket, some other members of the Cunninghame clan and shot dead. This murder was a result of a long-standing feud between the two families, involving in 1523, no less than 22 recorded raids upon the Montgomeries by the Cunninghames. Most other versions have the earl departing from Eglinton; certainly, the Annick Water lies on the route from Eglinton Castle to Stirling, via Eaglesham, and at that point lies close to Polnoon Castle. Metcalfe's version has the earl killed about six miles from Polnoon on a tryst to Stirling, on the 18 April.

== The demise of the castle ==
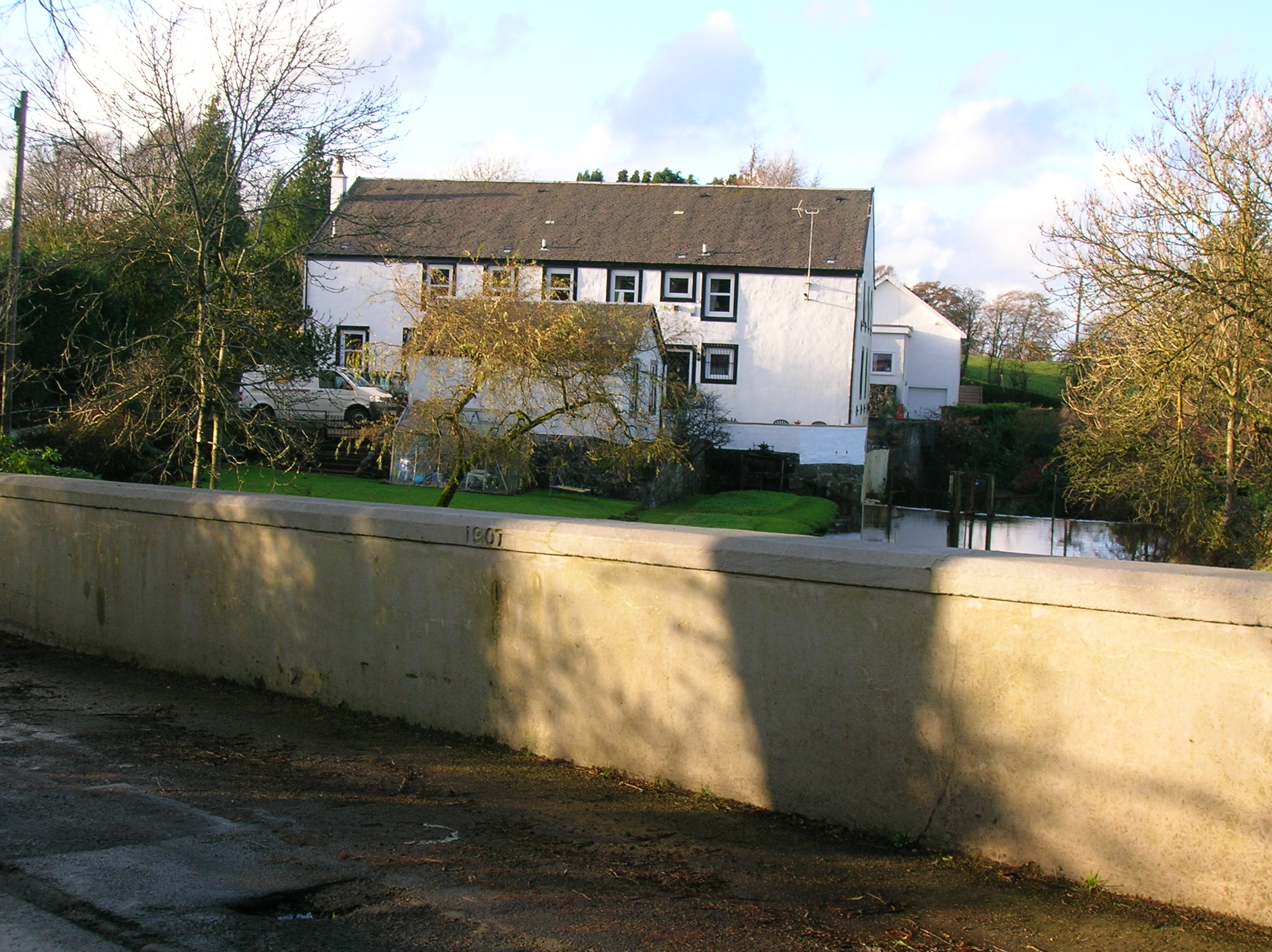
Millhall Mill and bridge

Following the fourteenth century inter-marriage of the Montgomery family and the sole heiress of the Eglinton family, the unification of the baronies of Eglinton, Ardrossan and Eaglesham took place. Eglinton Castle became the seat of the Montgomerys and Polnoon became of relatively minor importance, especially after King James IV created Hugh, fifth Lord Montgomery, Earl of Eglington (sic) in 1503. Polnoon Castle was refurbished for occupation in 1617, but was a ruin by 1676 and rapidly fell into decay, no doubt being robbed for building materials when the earl's new village of Eaglesham was being built in the 18th century, circa 1769. Blaeu's map of circa 1654 shows the castle of Pounuyn (sic) as being intact. Ainslie's map of 1796 shows the castle as a ruin.

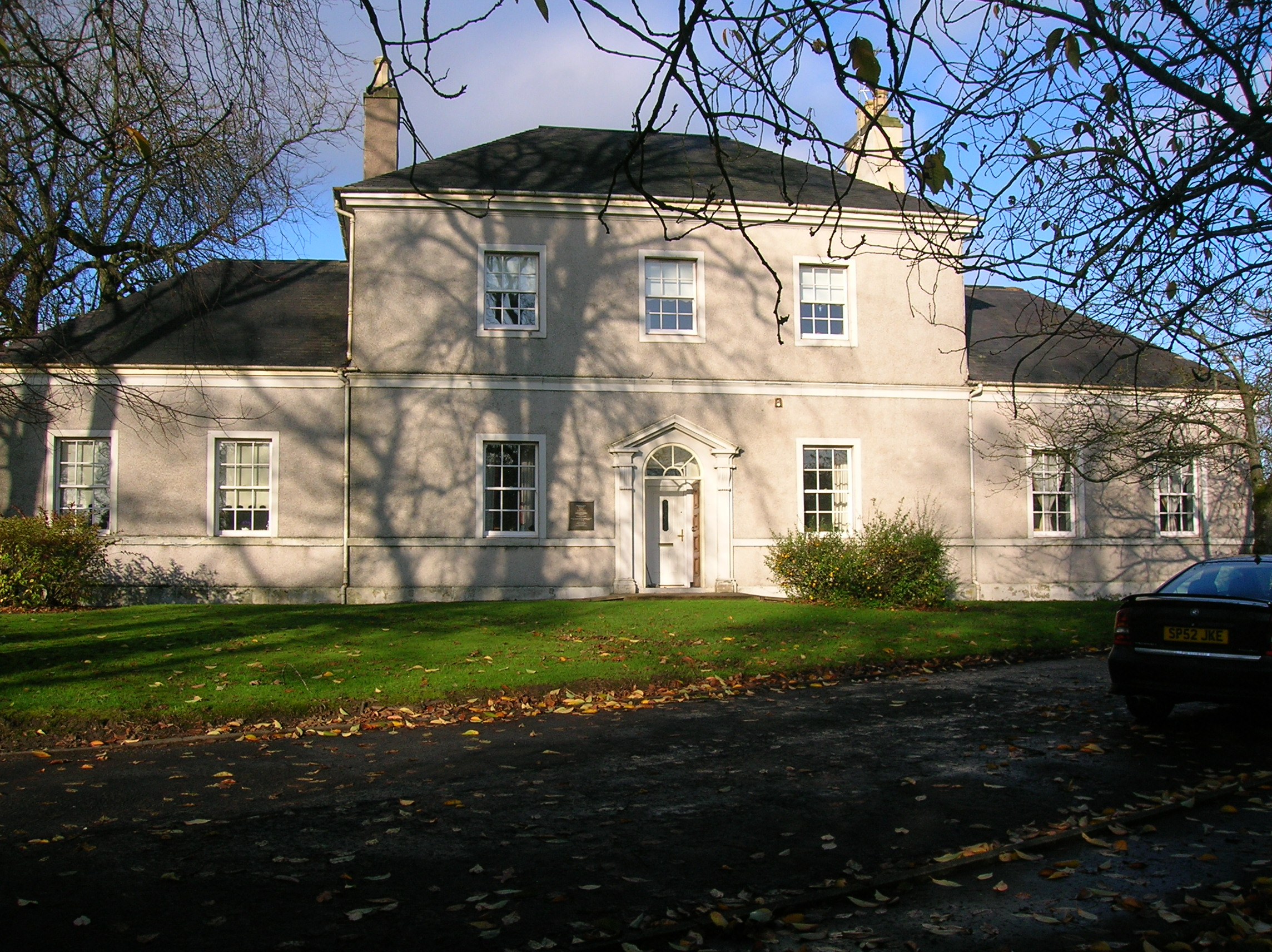
Polnoon Lodge, Gilmour Street, Eaglesham

Polnoon Lodge in Eaglesham was originally built as a hunting lodge in the early eighteenth century by Alexander, ninth Earl of Eglinton after Polnoon Castle was abandoned. The original house was built in 1733, the present B-Listed house however dates to the later 18th century.

Cheapside House was built by the 11th Earl in the 1770s for his Estate Factor, the lands of the estate at that time being 15,000 acres in extent. It was built as a miniature version of Polnoon Lodge which it faces across the Town Area. The Earl's kennels for his hunting dogs were located on a site at what is now Lynn Cottage within the Orry in an area still known as the Gamekeeper's Park.

The Earl of Eglinton's trustees sold the entire Eaglesham Estate in 1844, including Polnoon Castle to defray the costs of the Eglinton Tournament of 1839. Anstruther has it that the 13th earl sold the estates to pay off his grandfather's (12th Earl) debts circa 1834 for £220,000.

== The area around Polnoon ==
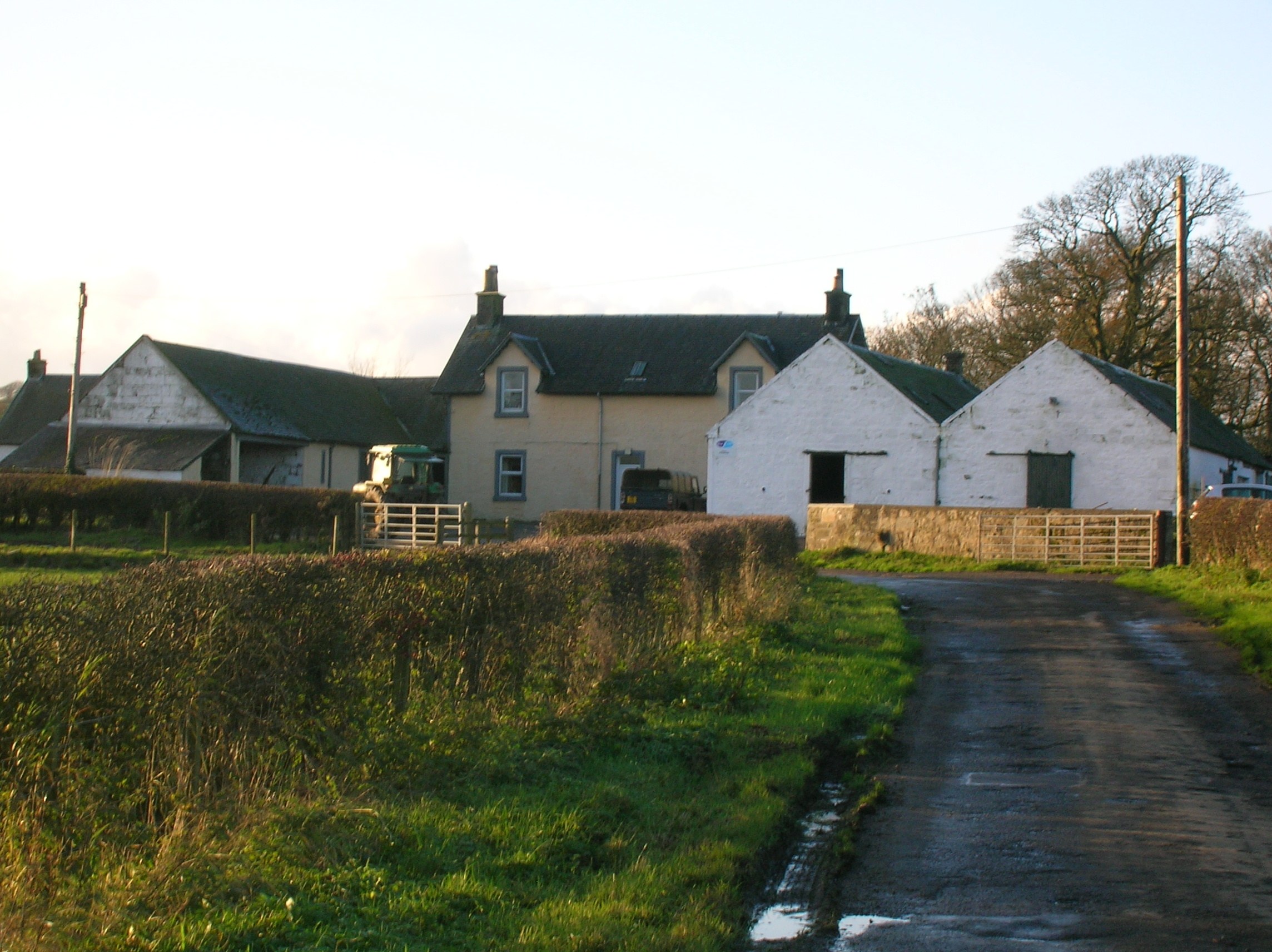
Polnoon Farm with castle motte behind

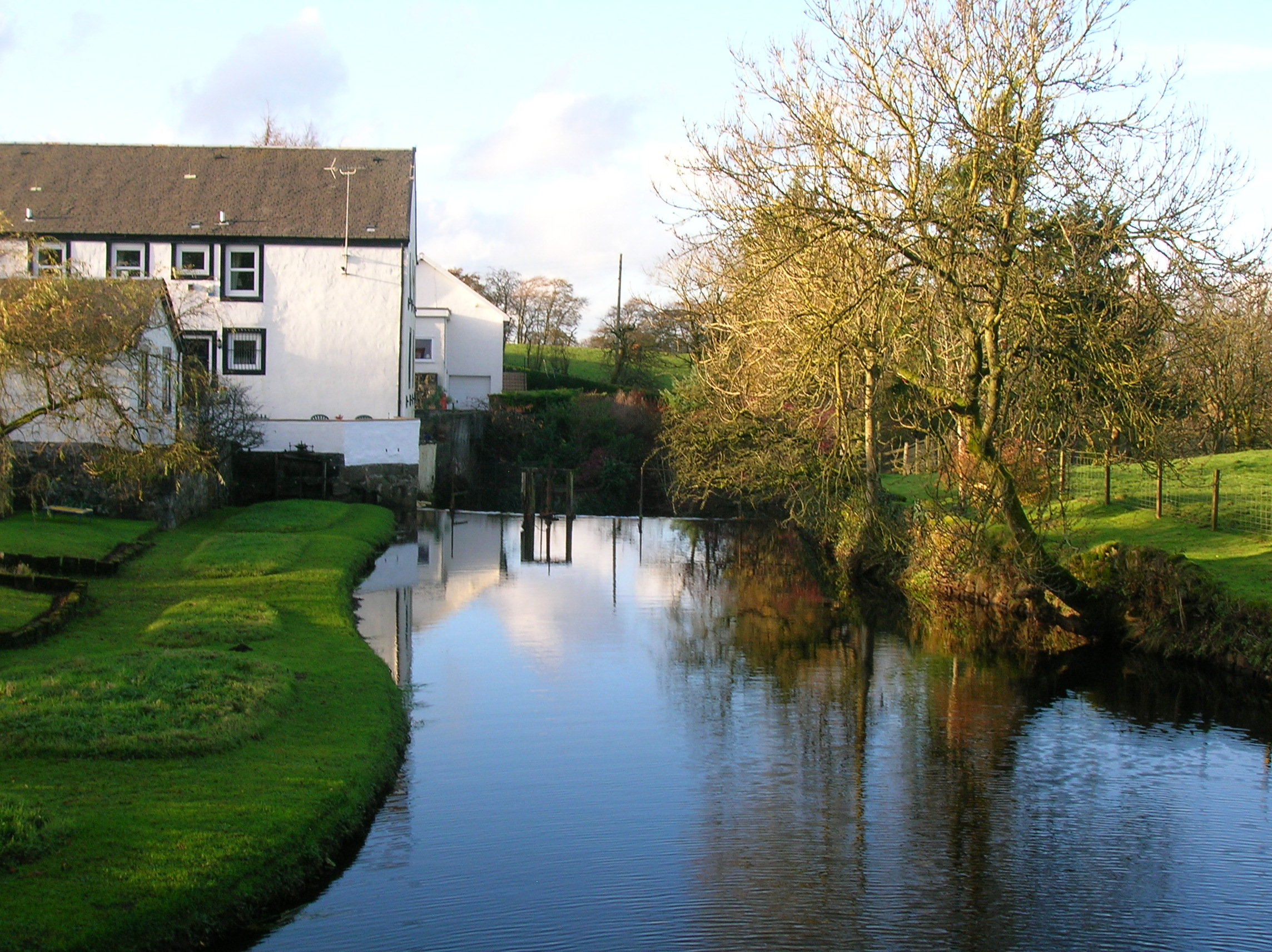
The mill, mill pond and dam with its sluice-gate

Polnoon Farm is located nearby; the Poll Tax Roll of 1695 lists the farm as being owned by the Wallace family and supporting 3 households. Mains Farm may have been more closely associated with the castle in the past as the term suggests that it was the home farm of Polnoon, possibly in the 17th century. A second building is shown as present near to the castle on Roy's map; this may be Polnoon farm. In 1796 Polnoon Farm is shown and a lane runs directly to Mains Farm.

Millhall is a hamlet situated across the Polnoon Burn to the west, centred on the Millhall Mill; now converted as private housing. The mill pond, dam and sluice are still present. This is not the site however of an old feudal barony mill. A mill lade or water control diversion is clearly indicated on Roy's 1747 map.

== Moot and Gallows hills ==
Every feudal barony had a moot and gallows hill associated with it for the meetings of the baronial court; in the case of the Eaglesham barony the Castle Hill or the Deil's (Devil's) Planting, a tree-covered knoll, possibly a tumulus or motte close to Castlehill Farm, may have been the site of a moot-hill. It has some hollows and the RCAHMS record that many years ago the 'Laird's son' went digging for gold here and found nothing. Feudal justice may have been dispensed on this 'Justice or Court Hill' and another knoll nearby named Gallowshill was where execution of the 'doom' or sentence would have taken place. Ned's Mount and the Topfauld's Plantation lie off the Humbie Road. The Moot or Moat Hill in the Orry is also said to have been a moot-hill.

== Micro-history ==
The dwellings of Mid and High Boreland carry a name that links them with a castle that must have been nearby. A 'Boor' meant a serf and Norman lords often apportioned lands near their castles for their servants. Boreland also meant the land that was granted to the feudal superior specifically to be used to furnish food for his castle or dwelling.

The Eaglesham Feuars Association was established in 1774 and worked closely with the Estate Factor.

Views of the Castle Hill Plantation

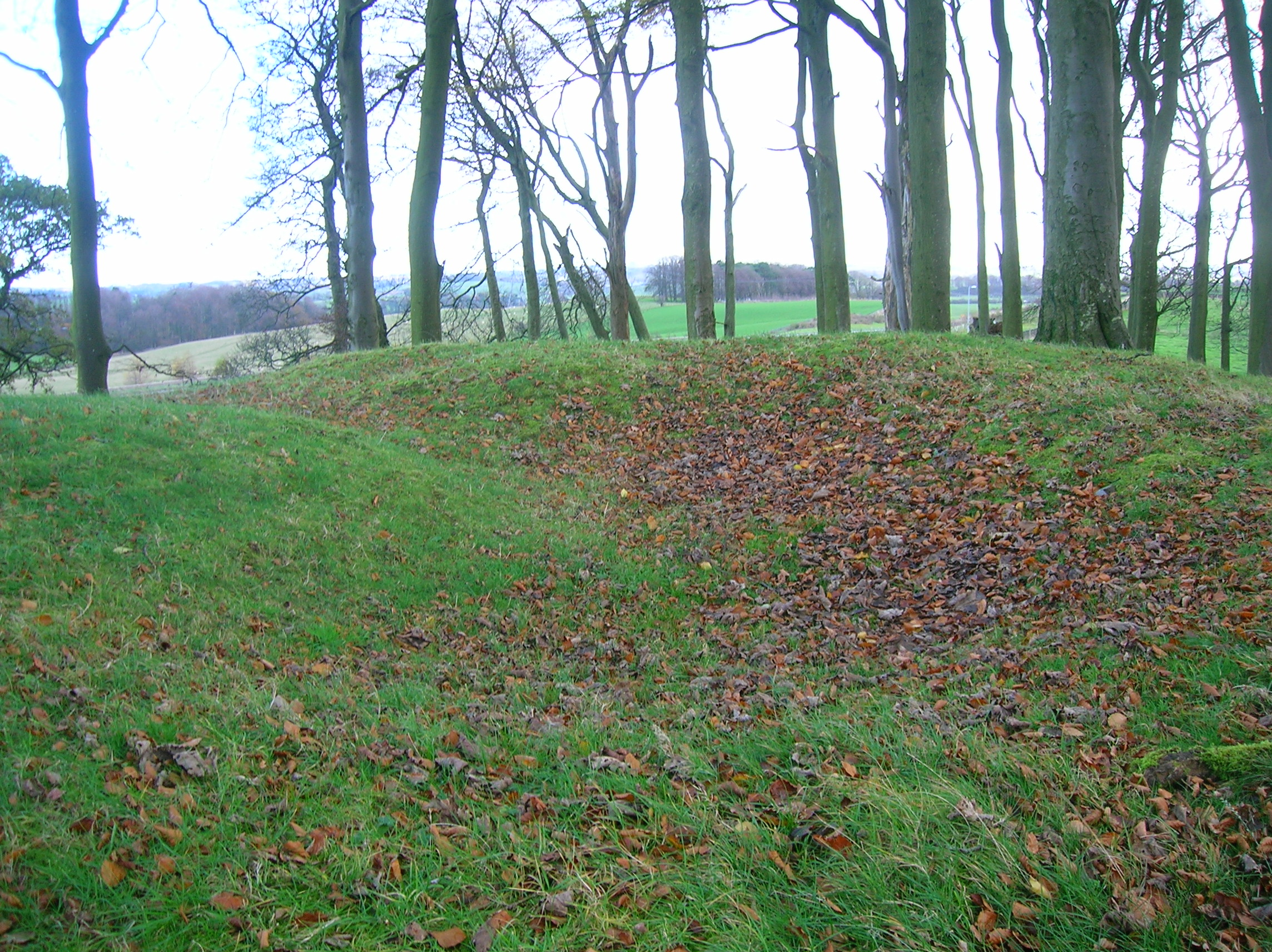
The top of the Castle Hill Plantation.

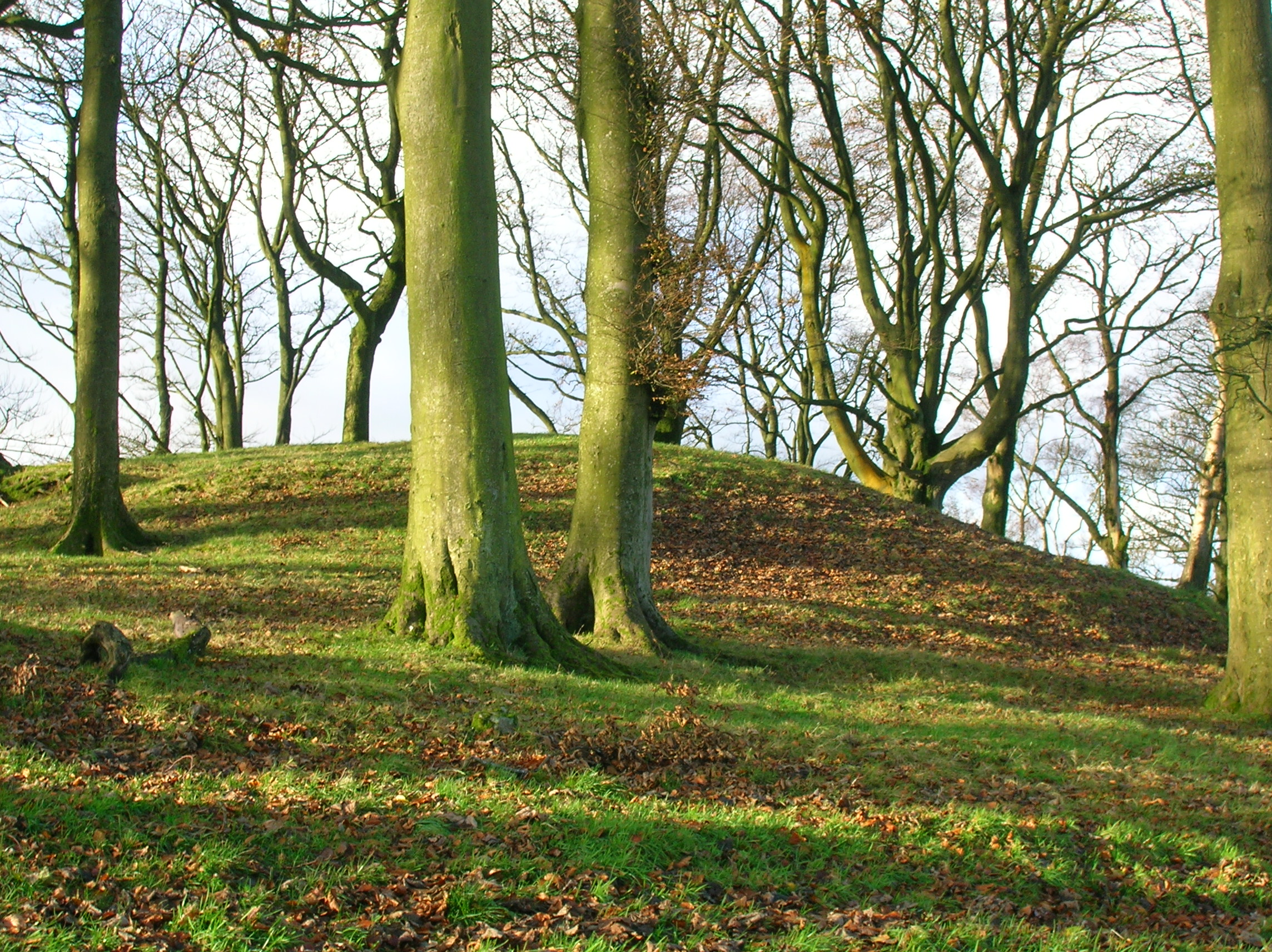
The Devil's Mount or Castle Hill Plantation.

== See also ==
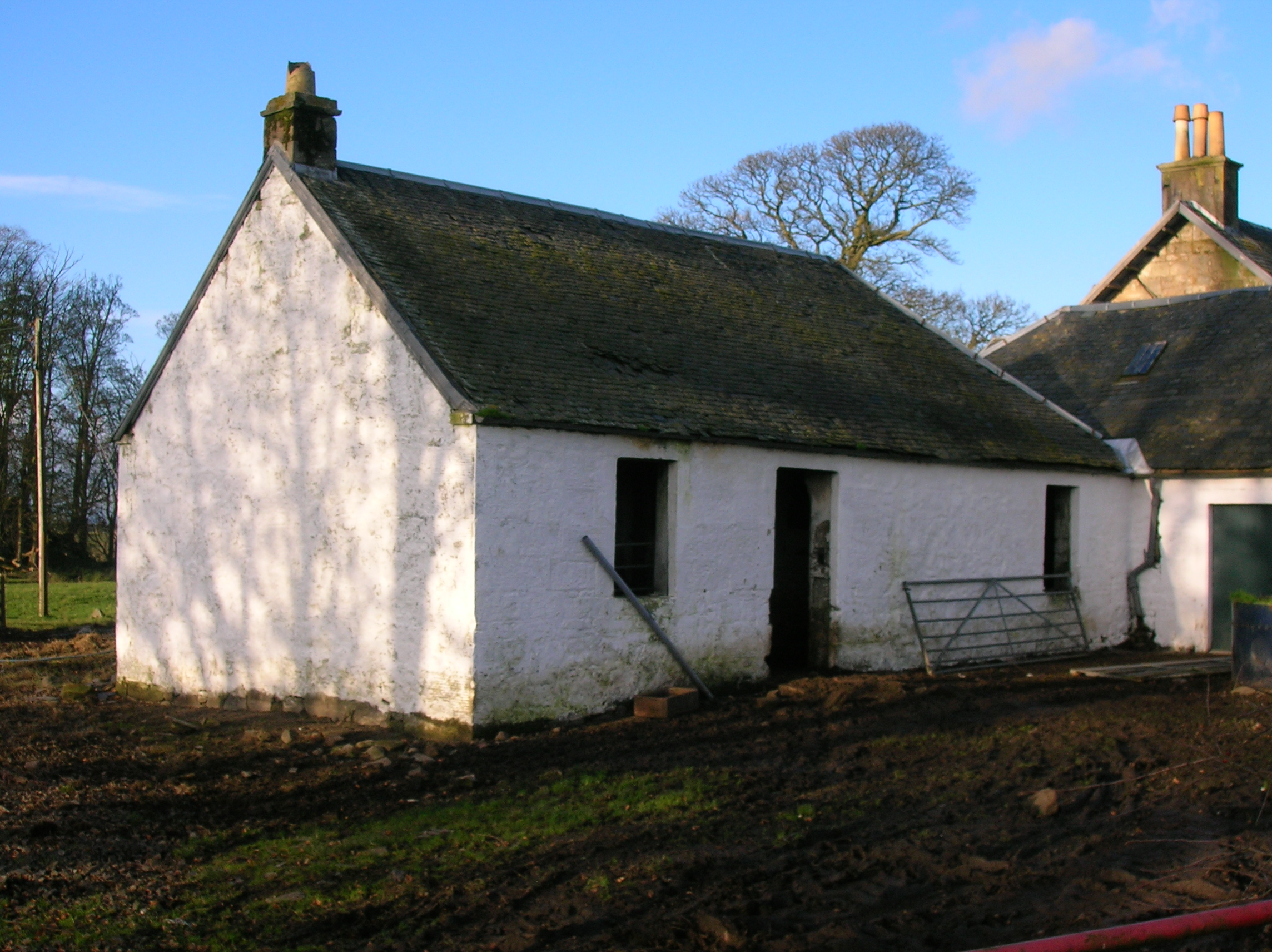
The old cot house at Polnoon Farm

- Eglinton Castle
- Clan Montgomery
- Eglinton Country Park
- Earl of Eglinton
