= Eaglesham =

Village in East Renfrewshire, Scotland

Coordinates: 55.739444°N 4.273333°W

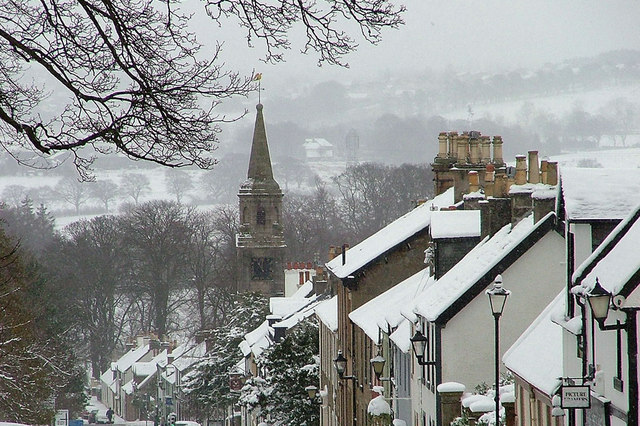
- Montgomery Street

- Location within East Renfrewshire Eaglesham (East Renfrewshire)
- Population: 3,470 (2020)
- OS grid reference: NS573519
- Community council: Eaglesham and Waterfoot
- Council area: East Renfrewshire
- Lieutenancy area: Renfrewshire
- Country: Scotland
- Sovereign state: United Kingdom
- Post town: GLASGOW
- Postcode district: G76
- Dialling code: 01355
- Police: Scotland
- Fire: Scottish
- Ambulance: Scottish
- UK Parliament: East Renfrewshire
- Scottish Parliament: Eastwood

Eaglesham (/ˈiːɡəlsəm/ EE-gəl-səm or /ˈiːɡəlʃəm/ EE-gəl-shəm) is a village in East Renfrewshire, Scotland, situated about 10 miles (16 km) south of Glasgow, 3 miles (5 km) southeast of Newton Mearns and south of Clarkston, and 4 miles (6.4 km) southwest of East Kilbride.

The 2011 census revealed that the village had 3,114 occupants, down 13 from the 2001 census (3,127). Eaglesham is distinctive in being built around the Orry, a triangular park area of common land about 1/3 mile (540 m) in length, interspersed with trees and divided in the centre by the Eaglesham Burn. The ancient seat of the Earls of Eglinton. In the 17th century Eaglesham was a small market town. Today's village was founded in 1769 by Alexander Montgomerie, 10th Earl of Eglinton. It had at one time handloom weaving and a cotton-mill. Many of its buildings are category B or C listed buildings, and the planned village area is a conservation area. Eaglesham was designated Scotland's first outstanding conservation area in 1960. It is likely that here has been a place of worship since the 5th or 6th centuries.

The village is an example of an early Scottish planned village.

== History ==
=== Origin of the name ===
Eaglesham is a hybrid name, composed of the Brittonic element *egles (ultimately from Latin ecclesia) and the Old English element ham; the meaning is "church estate".

=== The Middle Ages ===
The parish of Eaglesham formed part of the district of Mearns, and together with other lands was bestowed on Walter fitz Alan, Steward of Scotland (1106–1177), a member of the FitzAlan family, by David I. It is almost certain that Walter granted Eaglesham to Robert de Montgomerie, one of his principal followers, who appears to have originated from the Shropshire lands of the FitzAlans.

Situated in the Orry is the Motte or Moot Hill, a flat-topped mound situated on the north-west bank of the Eaglesham Burn in the Orry used for judicial and local assemblies.

In 1361, Sir John de Montgomerie of Eaglesham and Eastwood married Elizabeth, daughter of Sir Hugh de Eglinton and niece of King Robert II. Sir John obtained the baronies of Eglinton and Ardrossan upon Sir Hugh's death in 1374. Afterwards the Montgomeries made Eglinton Estate their chief residence. In 1388, Sir John de Montgomerie captured Sir Henry Percy at the Battle of Otterburn. It is believed that Sir John accepted a ransom for his prisoner and built Polnoon Castle on a small hillock on what appears to be an earlier motte. Polnoon Castle was refurbished for occupation in 1617 but was in ruins by 1676.

=== 17th century ===
Following a period of peace and relative stability in Scotland during the reign of King James VI, religion continued to be a major issue. The Calvinistic Covenanter movement was founded as a reaction against the efforts of King Charles I to forcibly introduce High Church Episcopalianism inspired by the Caroline Divines and a hierarchy of bishops into the Church of Scotland. The population of Renfrewshire was predominantly in favour of the National Covenant and Alexander, 6th Earl of Eglinton signed the covenant. Covenanters faced steep fines or even the threat of execution for expressing their faith and held their religious services (conventicles) in secret.

Alexander Montgomerie, 8th Earl of Eglinton obtained an Act of Parliament in 1672 for an annual fair and weekly market. By the time the New Statistical Account for Scotland was published in 1845 the weekly market had long been discontinued and a flower show was held in place of fairs. The fair was revived in 1961 and in recent years is held bi-annually in May or June and traditionally opens with a procession parading through the village.

=== 18th and 19th centuries ===
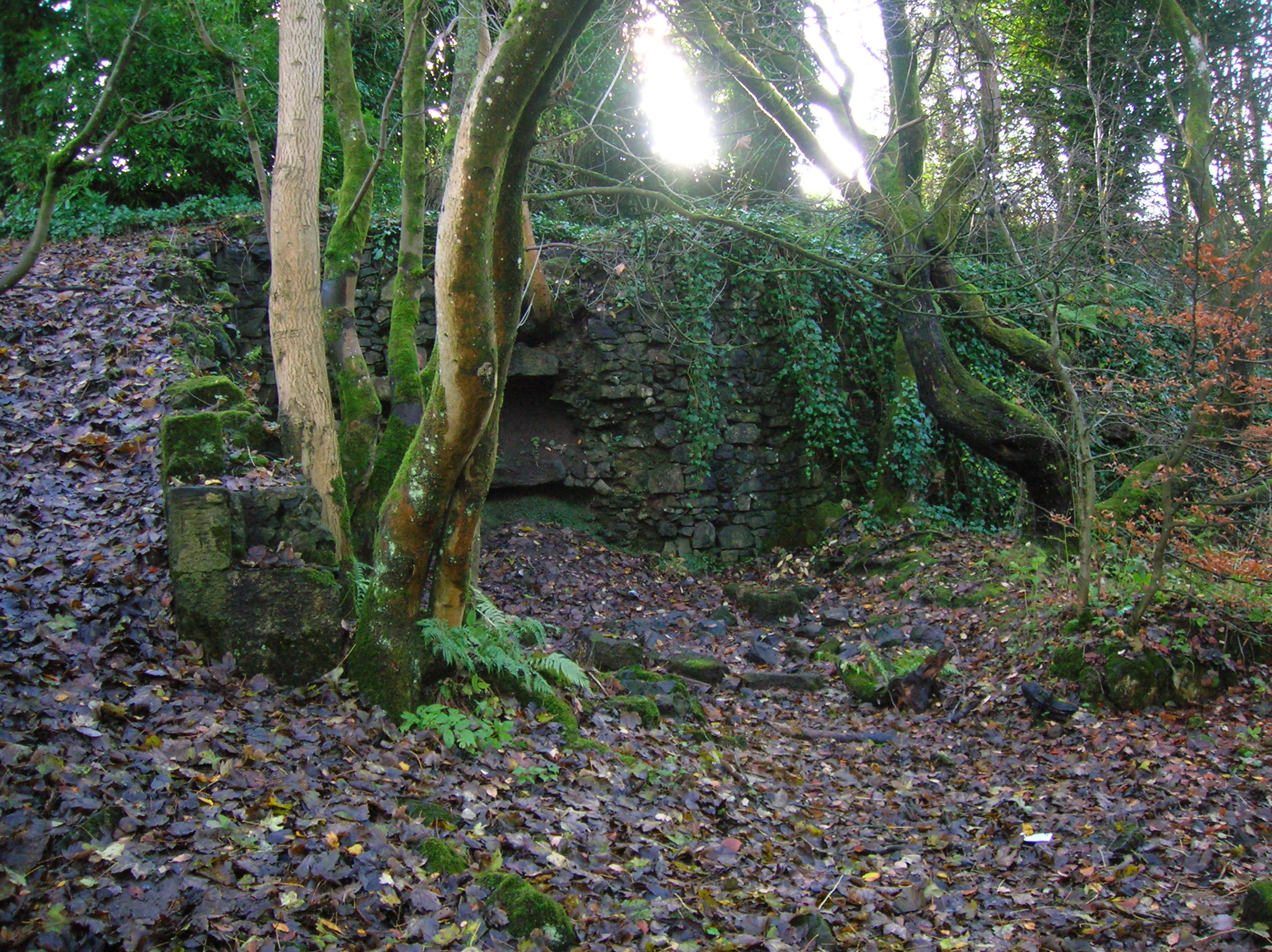
Ruins of the Orry cotton mill

Until the 18th century, Scotland's villages were little more than settlements loosely organised around fermtouns. In 1769 Alexander, 10th Earl of Eglinton, began the work of developing the old Kirktoun of Eaglesham into a planned village. However, it was his successor, Archibald, 11th Earl of Eglinton, who largely saw Alexander's plans through to completion. The Earl planned his new village with two ranges of houses built around the Orry, an area of common land (Orry is from the Scots word, aurie meaning area), divided in the centre by the Eaglesham Burn. Tacks were offered on 900-year leases. As a result of agricultural improvements, displaced workers became tradesmen or weavers in the village.

Eaglesham flourished during the age of agricultural and industrial improvements. Surgeons, shopkeepers and traders such as coopers; grocers; wrights; smiths; boot and shoemakers supplied the needs and demands of the increasing population. Churches met the religious needs of the inhabitants, schools provided education.

Handloom weaving became the main industry until the establishment of a water powered cotton spinning mill in the village in 1791. The Orry cotton spinning mill at its peak employed around 200 people. The mill burned down and was rebuilt several times before being destroyed by fire in 1876 and was never rebuilt. Without work many of the mill workers drifted away and their homes lay empty.

After seven centuries of ownership, the Montgomerie family's finances foundered, and Eaglesham Estate was put on the market in 1835. The Estate was finally sold for £217,000 in 1844 to Allan Gilmour, Sr. and James Gilmour.

East Renfrewshire Council's archives hold an unpublished manuscript "Graham's Eaglesham Essay" which details the history of the village at this time.

=== 20th century ===
By the early 20th century, The Eaglesham Estates were heavily burdened and together with the considerable debts left by Allan Gilmour were advertised for sale in the late 1920s. Angus Gilmour transferred the common area of the village of Eaglesham in 1929 to the parish council at his death. By the late 1930s many of the houses were in a state of disrepair. A letter-writing campaign was started and by the 1950s a worldwide appeal was launched for funds towards Eaglesham's conservation. Such was the success of the campaign, that the village was designated the first outstanding conservation area in Britain on 12 August 1960.

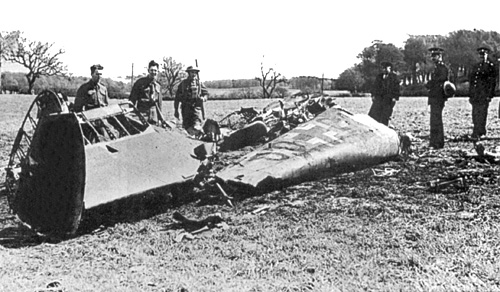
The wreckage of Rudolf Hess' Messerschmitt Bf 110D, after crashing at Bonnyton Farm on 10 May 1941

A remarkable event during World War II was the landing of Rudolf Hess at Eaglesham on 10 May 1941. Shortly after 11 p.m. a Messerschmitt Bf 110 aircraft crashed at Floors Farm with an airman bailing out and landing at Floors Farm. David McLean, a local ploughman, ran out of his cottage at the rear of Floors Farm after hearing an aeroplane crashing and saw a parachutist coming down. McLean assisted the slightly injured airman back to his cottage. The airman, a German officer, identified himself as Captain Albert Horn. Horn was arrested and subsequently taken to the 3 Battalion Home Guard Headquarters at Busby then briefly Giffnock Police Station before being transferred to Maryhill Barracks in Glasgow and other locations before finally being to transported to POW Reception Station, Abergavenny, South Wales where he remained for the duration of the hostilities. Horn turned out to be Deputy Führer Rudolf Hess. Hess apparently claimed that he had flown to Britain with a message for the Duke of Hamilton in an attempt to persuade the British government to restore peace but in poor light mistook his intended destination of Dungavel House near Strathaven as Eaglesham House. Hess was tried as a war criminal at Nuremberg where an International Military Tribunal found him guilty on two counts of 'concerted plan or conspiracy' and 'crimes against peace'. He spent the rest of his life imprisoned in Spandau Prison, Berlin.

== The village today ==
Eaglesham Heritage Trail opened on 3 September 2011, a project of Eaglesham & Waterfoot Community Development Trust. The trail consists of interpretation panels located throughout the village, explaining the history of the area from the 11th century to the present day. The village today is served by a primary school, churches, library and a number of local services such as garages, shops, restaurant, tearooms and the historic Eglinton Arms Hotel. Linn Products operate a state-of-the-art Hi-Fi production plant on the site of the former Eaglesham House. The majority of children of secondary school age attend either Mearns Castle High School, Newton Mearns or St Ninian's High School, Giffnock; state schools which have consistently ranked among the best in Scotland over many years. Clubs and societies include Eaglesham History Society, Eaglesham Amateurs football team, Eaglesham Angling Association Angling, Eaglesham Bowling Club and Walton Angling Club. The opening of the Glasgow Southern Orbital Road in 2005 generated considerable environmental benefits by reducing through traffic and creating a cleaner, safer environment for the local community.

== Places of interest ==
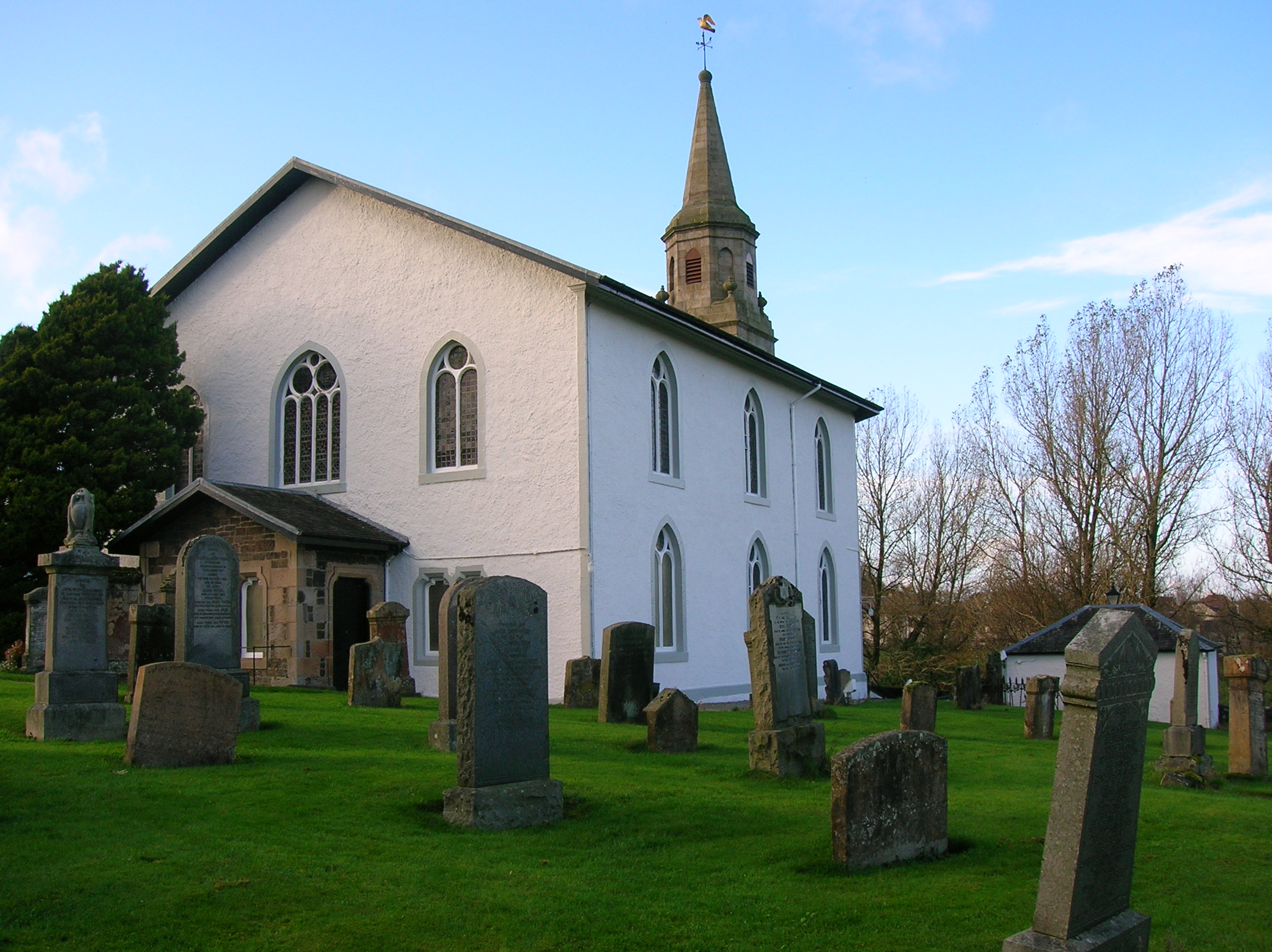
Eaglesham Parish Church

=== Eaglesham Parish Church ===
It is probable that there has been a place of worship here since the 5th or 6th century. The present church was designed by Robert McLachlane and completed in 1790. The church was originally a small octagonal building and later extended. A memorial to Covenanters Robert Lockhart and Gabriel Thomson who were shot by Highlandmen and Dragoons under the command of Archibald MacAulay for their adherence to the Solemn League and Covenant as they returned from a conventicle on 1 May 1685, stands in the kirkyard.

=== St Bridget's Church ===
In 1857, a Roman Catholic church was established mainly for Irish immigrant workers in the cotton mill. St. Bridget, born in 451 at Faughart near Dundalk is the patroness of the church. The church has a huge canvas of the Deposition of Christ from the Cross by de Surne.

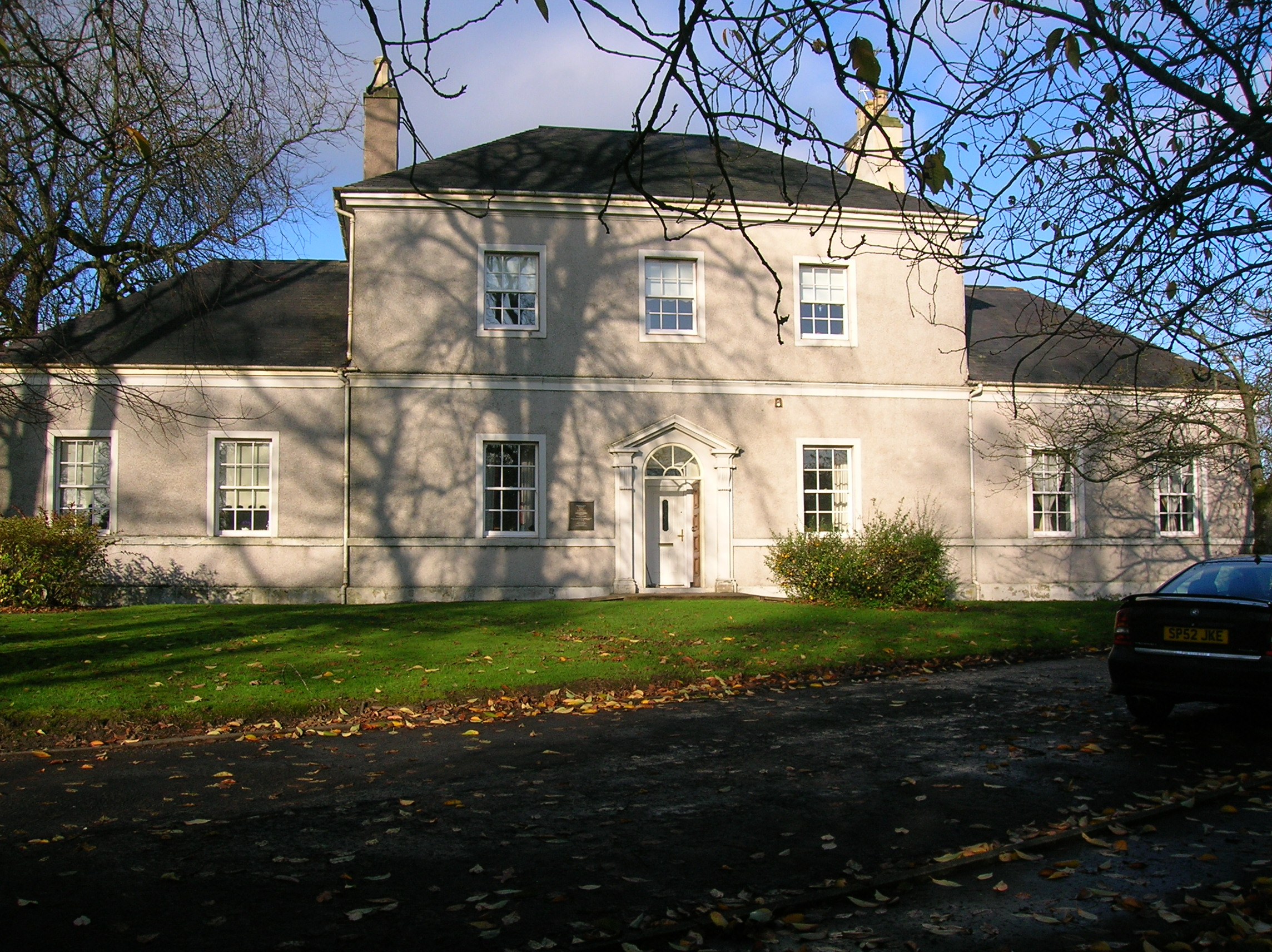
Polnoon Lodge, Gilmour Street

=== Polnoon Lodge ===
Polnoon Lodge was originally built as a hunting lodge in the early 18th century by Alexander, ninth Earl of Eglinton. Following the sale of the Eaglesham Estate in 1844 to Allan and James Gilmour, the lodge was used as the Polnoon Estate office for a short period of time before being let. By the 1920s the lodge operated as a temperance hotel and later on as a boarding house. An annexe was used as a meeting room for local groups and societies. The lodge lay empty by the 1960s and was renovated by Renfrew County Council as housing for the elderly. The restoration work won a Civic Trust Award in 1971. One of the houses in Cheapside Street is a miniature of the lodge and was once occupied by the Eaglesham Estate factor.

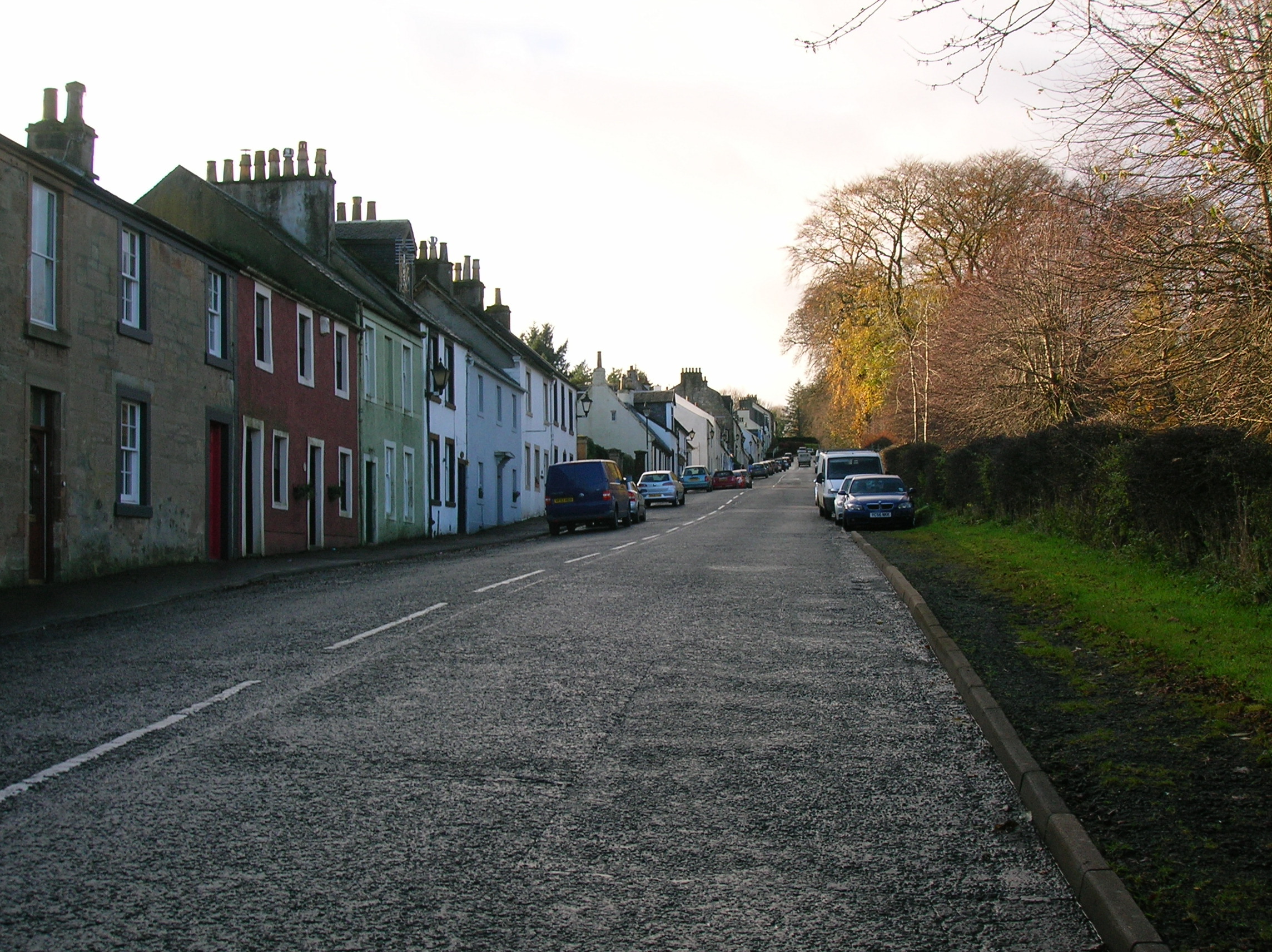
Montgomery Street

=== Montgomery Street ===
Montgomery Street was once known as South Street and commemorates the Montgomeries, the Earls of Eglinton and later Earls of Winton who owned Eaglesham Estate for seven centuries.

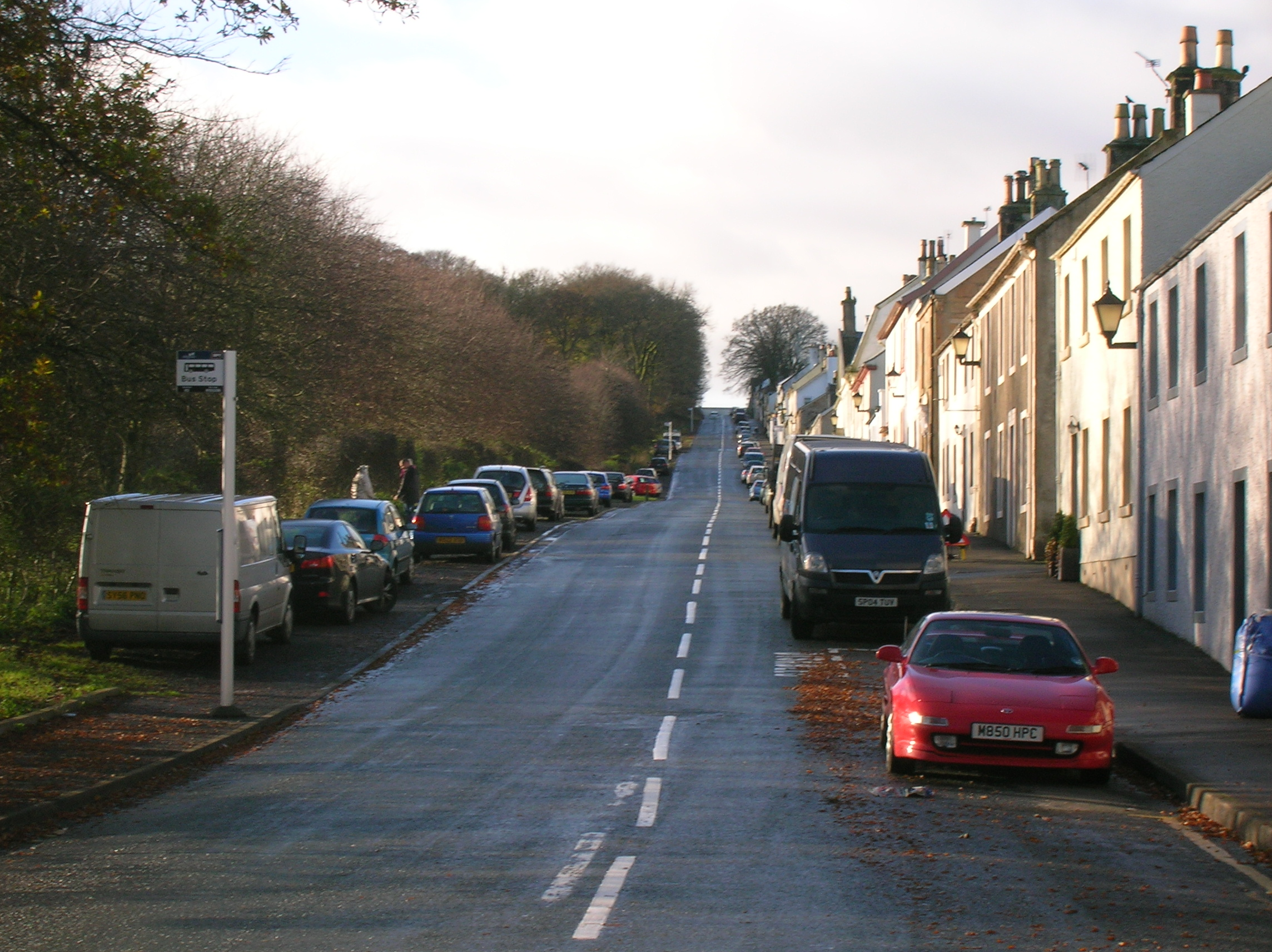
Polnoon Street

=== Polnoon Street ===
Polnoon Street was once known as North Street and borrows its name from Polnoon Estate. Sir John de Montgomerie built a castle at Polnoon with the poind money that he received for the release of Lord Percy following the Battle of Otterburn.

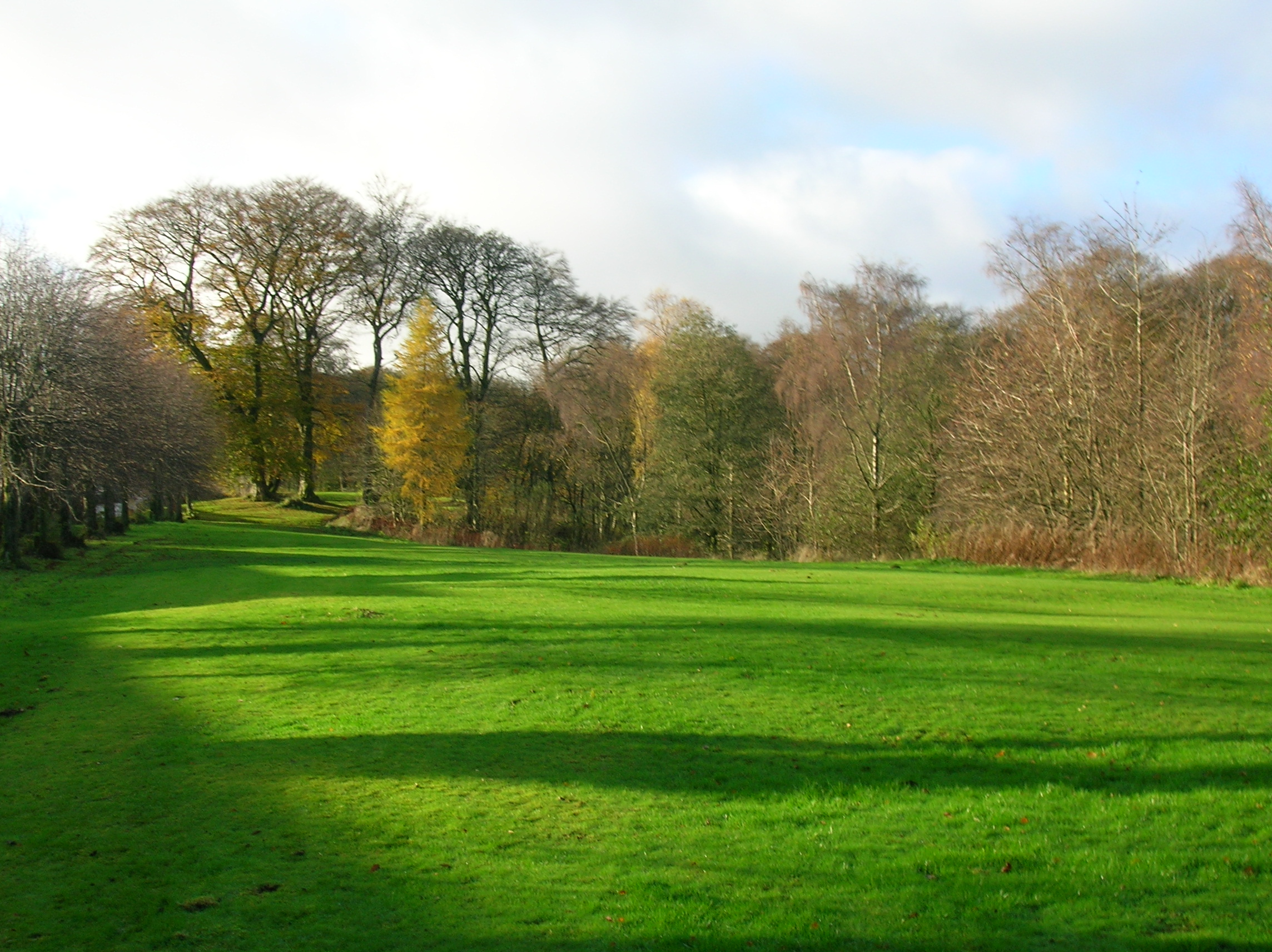
The Orry

=== Motte Hill ===
A motte beside the Eaglesham Burn (NS5751) in the Orry is a flat-topped mound situated on the north-west bank of the Eaglesham Burn. It is known locally as Moot Hill. The south-east side was truncated in the late 18th century by the building of the Orry cotton spinning mill, resulting in the removal of at least a third of the site. It was used by the local community as a site for meetings and festivals.

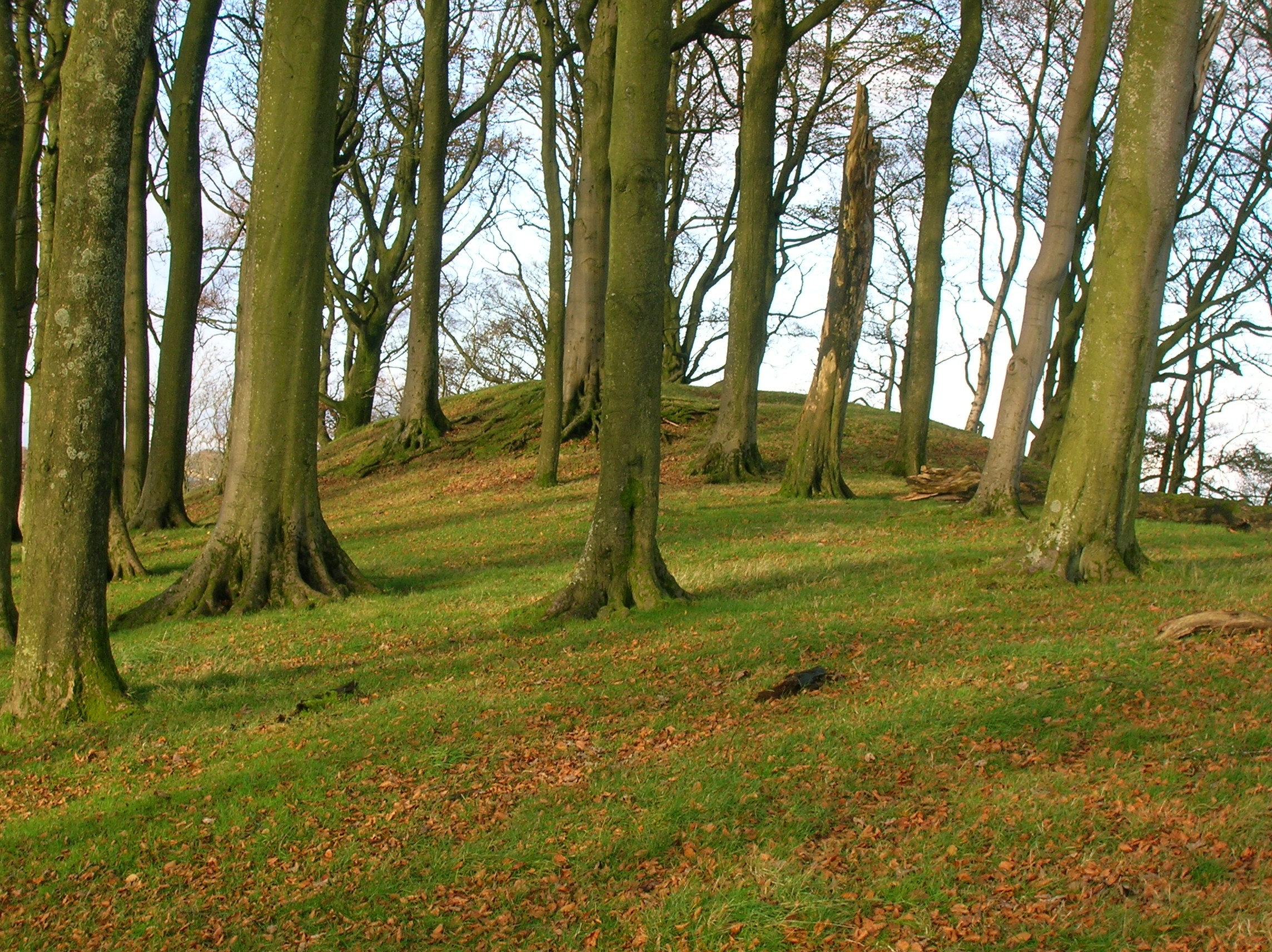
Deil's Wood cairn

=== Deil's Wood ===
The Deil's Wood cairn stands on the summit of a low but prominent ridge 350 metres (380 yd) east of Bonnyton farmsteading.

== Views in and around Eaglesham ==
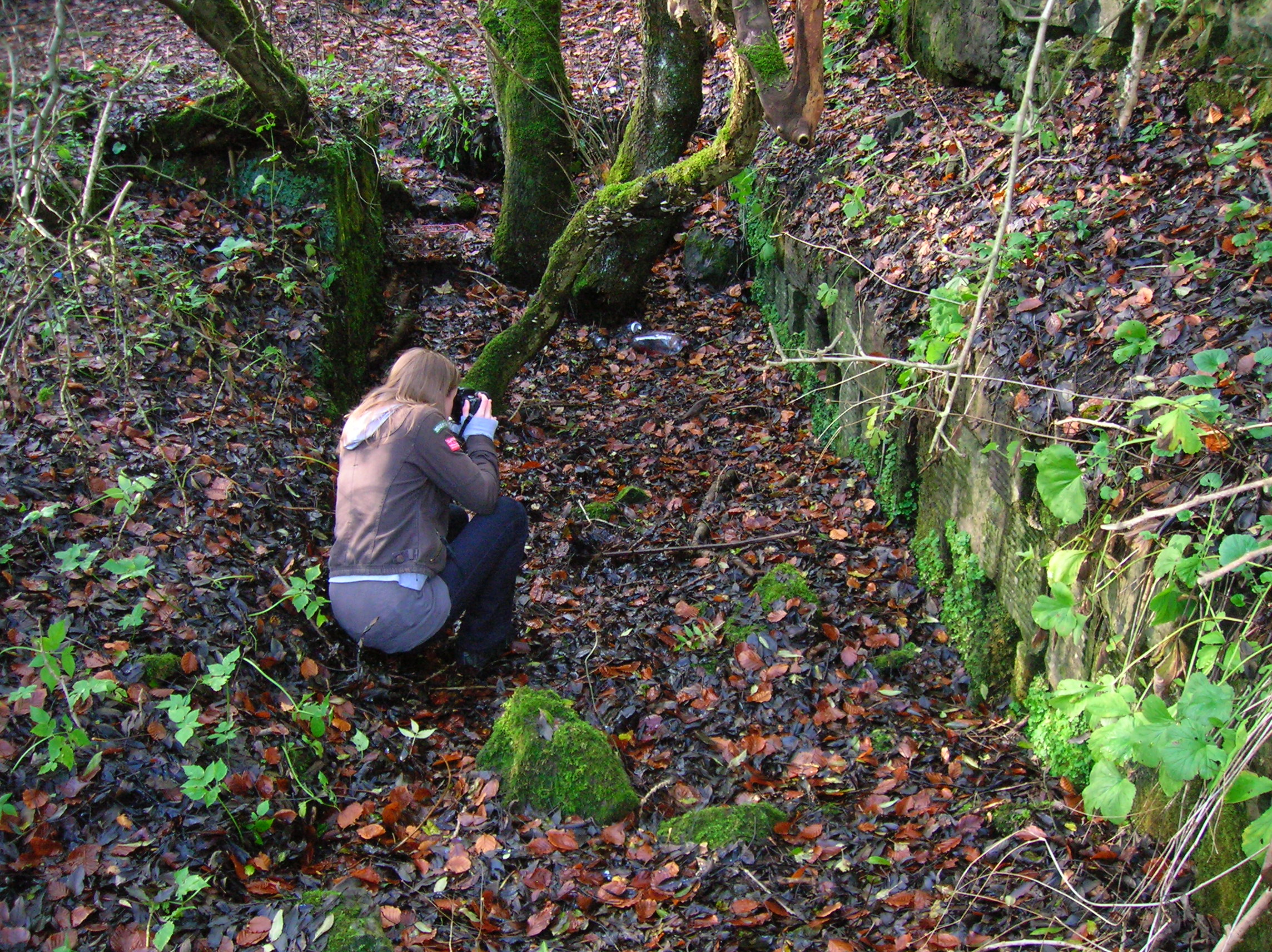
Orry Mill wheel pit

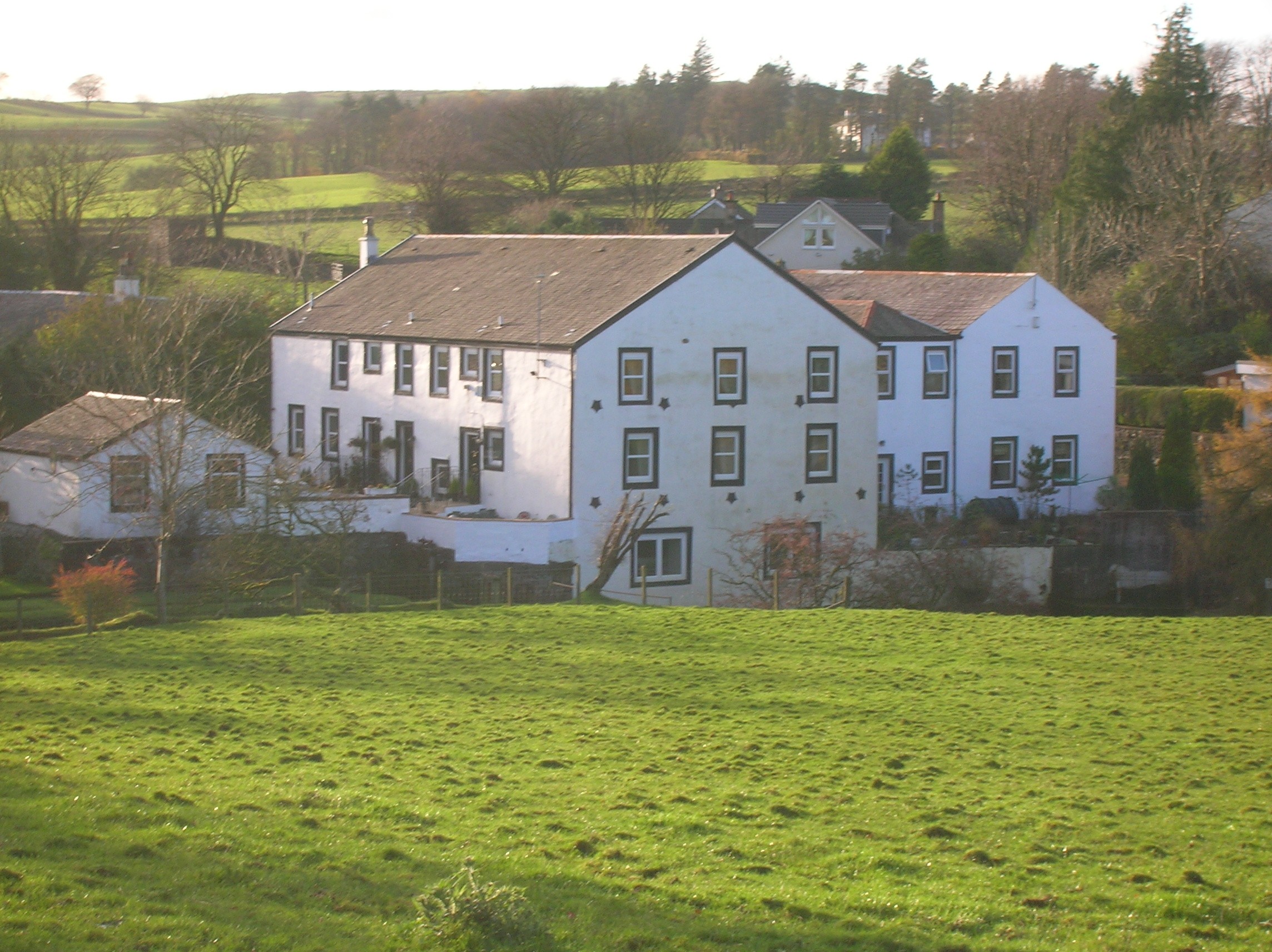
Millhall Mill from Polnoon Farm

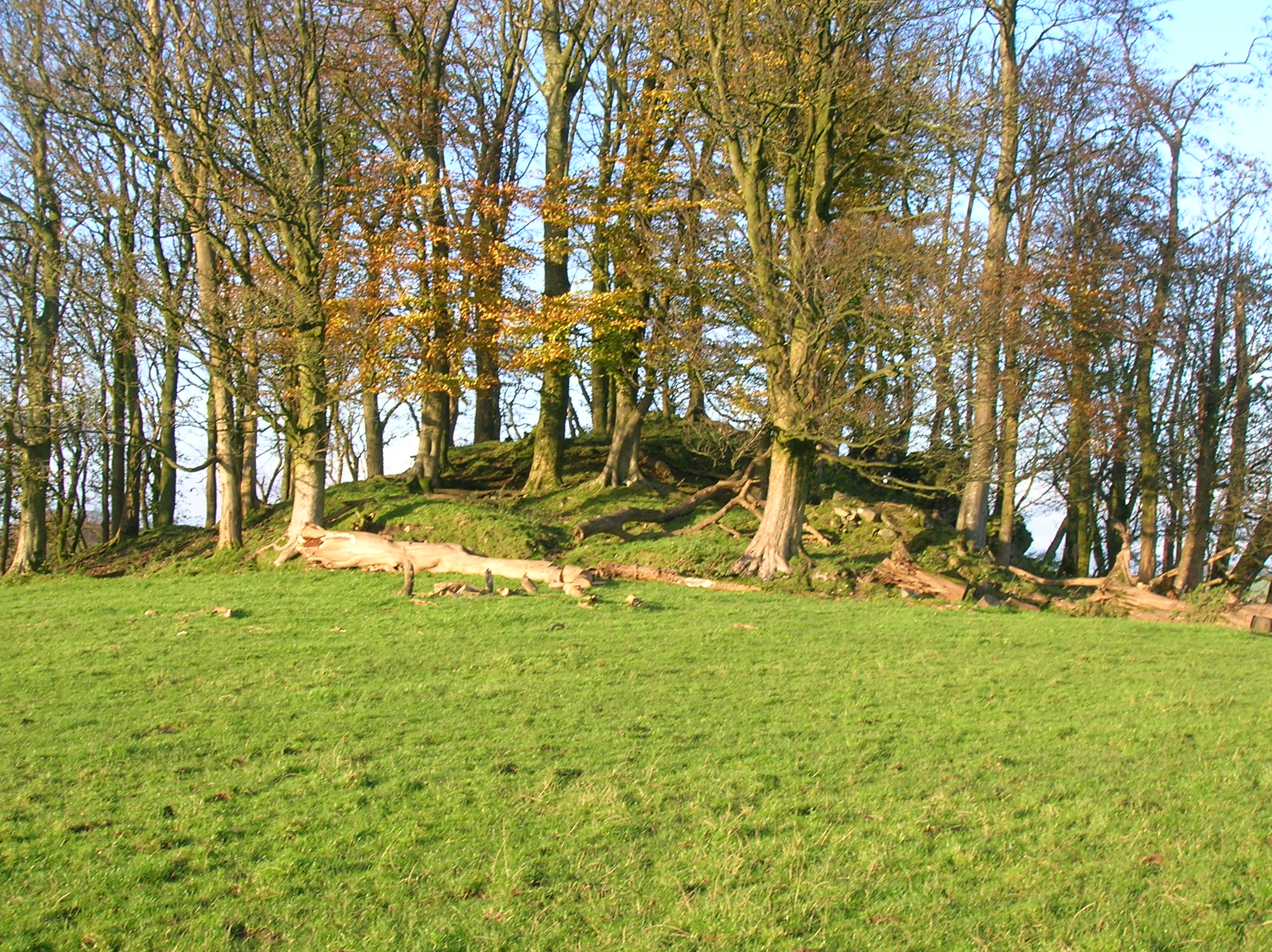
Polnoon Castle motte

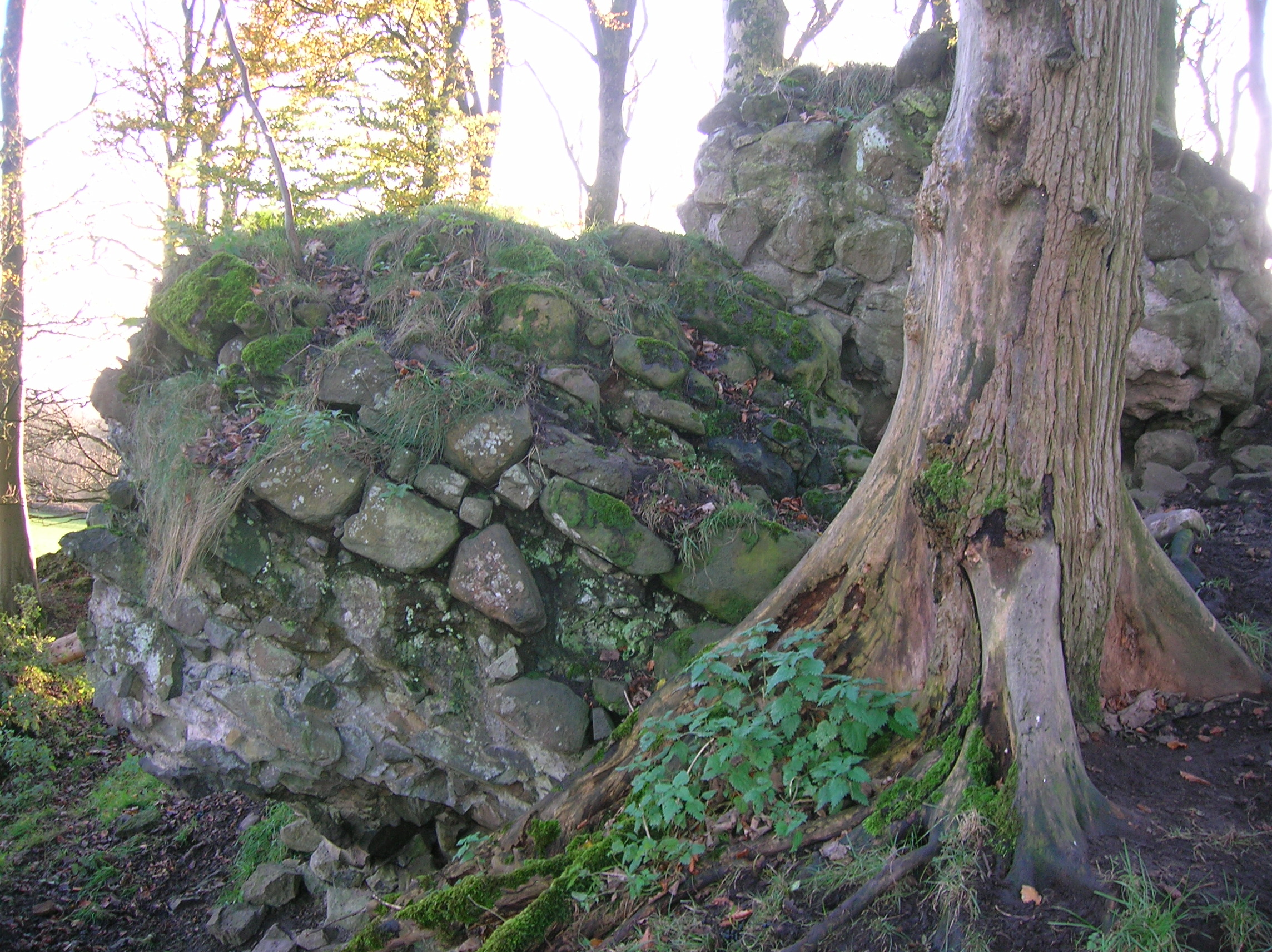
Large masonry block with mortar
