= Nottinghamshire Police =

English territorial police force

Agency overview
- Formed: 1968; 58 years ago
- Preceding agencies: Nottingham City Police 1836 / 1841; Nottinghamshire Constabulary 1840; Retford Borough Police 1836; Newark-on-Trent Borough Police 1836

Jurisdictional structure
- Operations jurisdiction: Nottinghamshire, UK
- Map of Nottinghamshire Police's jurisdiction
- Area: 830 square miles (2,100 km^{2})
- Population: 1,170,475
- Constituting instrument: Police Act 1996
- General nature: Local civilian police

Operational structure
- Overseen by: His Majesty's Inspectorate of Constabulary and Fire & Rescue Services; Independent Office for Police Conduct
- Headquarters: Arnold
- Sworn members: 2,361 (FTE 2022)
- Police and Crime Commissioner responsible: Gary Godden, (L)
- Agency executive: Steve Cooper, Chief Constable
- Divisions: 2

Facilities
- Stations: 31

Website
- www.nottinghamshire.police.uk

Nottinghamshire Police is the territorial police force responsible for policing the ceremonial county of Nottinghamshire in the East Midlands of England. The area has a population of just over 1 million.

The force headquarters are at Arnold. As of April 2022, the force had 2,238 police officers, 1,465 police staff including PCSOs, around 163 special constables, 113 police support volunteers, 19 student placement volunteers and 131 police cadets.

The chief constable from 2026 is Steve Cooper, who succeeded Kate Meynell, appointed from nearby Derbyshire Constabulary in December 2022. Meynell followed Craig Guildford, in-post since February 2017.

Nottinghamshire Police Authority, which governed the force, was disbanded in November 2012, when the first Nottinghamshire Police and Crime Commissioner was elected.

== History ==
Nottinghamshire Constabulary was established in 1840. The following year it absorbed Retford Borough Police. In 1947, it absorbed Newark-on-Trent Borough Police. In 1968 it amalgamated with Nottingham City Police to form Nottinghamshire Combined Constabulary. On 1 April 1974, it was reconstituted as Nottinghamshire Police under the Local Government Act 1972, but retained the name Nottinghamshire Constabulary on all signage, uniform and vehicles until the early 21st century.

In 1965, Nottinghamshire Constabulary had an establishment of 1,026 officers and an actual strength of 798.

Proposals made by the Home Secretary in March 2006, would have seen the force merge with the other four East Midlands forces to form a strategic police force for the entire region, but in July 2006 the proposed merger was cancelled.

In June 2006, the force was declared effective and efficient by Her Majesty's Inspectorate of Constabulary (HMIC) after five years of intense scrutiny.

In 2009, a performance assessment carried out by the government ranked the force's operational area as the third worst in the country.

In March 2010, HMIC rated the force as 'poor' in three reviewed areas of, 'Local Policing', 'Confidence' and 'Protecting from Harm'. Nottinghamshire Police were the only force in England & Wales to receive such a rating. Although HMIC did not attempt to place the 43 police forces in England & Wales in a directly comparable league table (due to difficulties in comparing a large city force with a small rural force), Nottinghamshire Police did give HMIC cause for concern. The media portrayed the analysis as showing the force as the 'worst in England & Wales'.

=== Chief Constables ===
The chief constables of Nottingham City and Borough of Nottingham Police were:

- 1814–1833 Richard Birth
- 1833–? William Barnes
- 1860–1865 Joseph Hedington
- 1865–1869 John Freeman (former chief constable of Plymouth)
- 1869–1873 Captain F. Parry (appointed chief constable of Derbyshire Constabulary)
- 1873–1881 Major William Henry Poyntz (appointed chief constable of Essex)
- 1881–1892 Samuel Stevens (former chief constable of Rochdale)
- 1892–1912 Phillip Stephen Clay (former chief constable of Southampton)
- 1912–1930 Lt. Col. F. Lemon
- 1930–1959 Captain Athelstan Popkess
- 1960–1968 Thomas Moore

In 1968, Nottingham City Police merged with Nottinghamshire Constabulary. Its chief constables were:

- 21 April 1840 – February 1842 Major Samuel Walker
- Feb 1842 – October 1852 Peter Valetine Hatton (dismissed for inefficiency)
- October 1852 – July 1856 Captain John Henry Forrest (later appointed chief constable of Hampshire)
- 8 July 1856 – November 1892 Captain Henry Holden
- 1 December 1892 – 1October 1922 Captain Sir William Hugh Tomasson
- December 1949–1970 John Edward Stevenson Browne
- 1970–1976 Rex Fletcher
- 1976–1987 Charles McLachlan
- 1987–1990 Sir Ronald Hadfield (knighted in 1995 Birthday Honours)
- 1990–1995 Sir Dan Crompton
- 1995–2000 Colin Bailey
- 2000–2008 Steven Green
- 2008–2012 Julia Hodson
- 2012–2016 Chris Eyre
- 2016–2017 Susannah Fish (acting chief constable)
- 2017–2022 Craig Guildford
- 2022–2025 Kate Meynell
- 2026–present Steve Cooper (acting since 2025)

=== Officers killed in the line of duty ===
The Police Memorial Trust lists and commemorates all British police officers killed in the line of duty, and since its establishment in 1984 has erected over 38 memorials nationally to some of those officers.

The following officers of Nottinghamshire Police are listed by the Trust as having died attempting to prevent, stop or solve a crime, since the turn of the 20th century:

- Sergeant Ernest Crowston, 1921 (fatally injured attempting to stop a speeding vehicle)
- PC Raymond Free, 1950 (collapsed after attending a domestic disturbance)
- PC Stephen Atkinson, 1977 (fatally injured in an accident when hit by a car while on point duty)
- PC Christopher John MacDonald, 1978 (beaten and drowned by burglar)
- PC Gerald Walker, 2003 (fatally injured when dragged by a stolen vehicle)
- Sergeant Graham Saville, 2023 (fatally struck by a train while helping a distressed man on the track)

=== Notable incidents and investigations ===
Notable major incidents and investigations in which Nottinghamshire Police have been involved in include:

- 1984–1985 United Kingdom miners' strike: The Nottinghamshire Constabulary were heavily involved in the policing of the 1984–1985 United Kingdom miners' strike within and beyond the borders of Nottinghamshire. As only a quarter of miners affiliated with the county's National Union of Mineworkers (NUM) chose to strike, Nottinghamshire's collieries were frequently targeted by flying pickets from other regions, especially from the NUM's Yorkshire Area. As a result, the Nottinghamshire Constabulary targeted flying pickets by setting up roadblocks and checkpoints along roads leading into Nottinghamshire under the Road Traffic Act 1972 and Police and Criminal Evidence Act 1984; on 28 June, the force reported 1,900 miners in 475 cars had been turned away from the county border in a single day. Penny Green found that a sample of striking miners "unamimously" considered officers of the Nottinghamshire Constabulary, alongside the Metropolitan Police, to be "the most violent, the most unsympathetic and the most intimidating" when confronting miners on picket lines throughout the strike.
- 2023 Nottingham attacks: Following three killings and serious injuries to three more in one sequence in June 2023, Police and Crime Commissioner Caroline Henry requested the College of Policing to undertake an independent review into the force's responses. Additionally, after complaints by the victims' families, the force's previous interactions with the offender, Valdo Calocane, are under scrutiny by the Independent Office for Police Conduct.

=== Mounted section ===
The mounted section, having seven horses and seven staff, was disbanded in 2012 as a cost-cutting exercise. The unit was used for crowd control at public events, including football matches. At the time, the saving was quoted to be £100K per annum.

== Police area ==
The police area covers the ceremonial county of Nottinghamshire, which contains the following local authorities:

Local Authority	Large towns/cities
Bassetlaw	Worksop, Retford, Harworth
Mansfield	Mansfield, Warsop
Newark and Sherwood	Newark-on-Trent, Ollerton, Southwell
Ashfield	Sutton-in-Ashfield, Kirkby-in-Ashfield, Hucknall
Gedling	Arnold, Carlton
Broxtowe	Beeston, Stapleford, Eastwood, Kimberley
Nottingham	City of Nottingham
Rushcliffe	West Bridgford, Cotgrave, Bingham

Map showing Local Authorities within the Police Area.

== Workforce ==
Year	Police officers (FTE)	Population	Police officers per 100,000 people
2009	2,411	1,074,913	224
2010	2,379	1,083,398	220
2011	2,214	1,090,695	203
2012	2,127	1,098,630	194
2013	2,130	1,107,080	192
2014	2,105	1,116,001	
2015	2,035	1,125,153	181
2016	1,893	1,136,262	167
2017	1,842	1,147,060	161
2018	1,968	1,154,195	170
2019	1,925	1,161,124	166
2020	2,077	1,170,475	177
2021	2,222		
2022	2,361		

== Divisional structure ==
In April 2018, the force restructured under chief constable Craig Guildford, and moved to a local policing model. Response teams moved back in alignment with local authority areas and local council boundaries. The force was then split into two response divisions:

- North (Bassetlaw, Newark & Sherwood, Mansfield, Ashfield, Gedling, City North)
- South (City Central, City South, Broxtowe Borough, Rushcliffe Borough).

As part of the restructure, the organisation moved response teams back locally, increasing the number of response bases from nine to 20.

- Bassetlaw
  - Harworth
  - Retford
  - Worksop
- Newark & Sherwood
  - Newark
  - Ollerton
- Mansfield
  - Mansfield
- Ashfield
  - Kirkby
  - Hucknall
- Gedling
  - Jubilee House - Arnold
- Rushcliffe
  - West Bridgford
  - Cotgrave
- Broxtowe
  - Eastwood
  - Beeston
- Nottingham City
  - Oxclose Lane
  - Bulwell
  - Broxtowe
  - Radford Road
  - Byron House (City Centre)
  - St Anns
  - Clifton/Meadows

Each Division was managed by a Demand Management Inspector (DMI) who is responsible for demand on their area.

=== Custody suites ===
There are two custody suites across the force: Bridewell (70 cells) and Mansfield (30 cells) Newark custody suite closed in 2017 however is able to be reopened if there is operational need.

=== Neighbourhood policing ===
Each local authority area is covered by a Neighbourhood Policing Team (NPT). Each Neighbourhood policing team is run by a neighbourhood policing inspector, also referred to as the district commander.

- Bassetlaw
- Newark
- Mansfield
- Ashfield
- Gedling
- Rushcliffe
- Broxtowe
- Nottingham City North
- Nottingham City West
- Nottingham City Central
- Nottingham City Centre
- Nottingham City South

=== Operational Support ===
Operational support policing for the force between 2015 and May 2018 was provided by the East Midlands Operational Support Service (EMOpSS), a multi-force alliance which provides roads policing, police dogs, armed response and other specialist services over Nottinghamshire, Leicestershire, Lincolnshire and Northamptonshire. In May 2018, Operational Support Policing withdrew from the regional collaboration and a new department was established. Air support for the force is provided by the National Police Air Service, who closed the former Nottinghamshire/Derbyshire Air Support Unit at Ripley in early 2015. Cover is now provided from further afield using the nearest available aircraft. This function was previously supplied to the force by a joint venture with Derbyshire Police, the North Midlands Helicopter Support Unit. In 2020, the air support has also been provided by a fixed-wing aircraft flying out of Doncaster Sheffield Airport.

=== Dog theft ===
In March 2021, Nottinghamshire Police became the first police force in the United Kingdom to appoint a dedicated dog theft lead, following increased rates of dog abductions during the coronavirus pandemic. The inspector would take a leading role in investigating cases of dognapping, work with Nottinghamshire Police’s Dog Section to produce advice for owners on how to keep their pet safe, and develop a 'Canine Coalition’ with dog welfare organisations to work together to both tackle the scourge of dog theft locally, and lobby Government for tougher sentences for dognappers.

On 15 March 2021, Chief Inspector Amy Styles-Jones was appointed to the role.

== PEEL inspection ==
His Majesty's Inspectorate of Constabulary and Fire & Rescue Services (HMICFRS) conducts a periodic police effectiveness, efficiency and legitimacy (PEEL) inspection of each police service's performance. In its latest PEEL inspection, Nottinghamshire Police was rated as follows:

	Outstanding	Good	Adequate	Requires Improvement	Inadequate
2021/22 rating		Investigating crime; Protecting vulnerable people	Preventing crime; Treatment of the public; Managing offenders; Responding to the public; Developing a positive workplace; Good use of resources	Recording data about crime	

== See also ==
- List of law enforcement agencies in the United Kingdom, Crown Dependencies and British Overseas Territories
- Law enforcement in the United Kingdom
