= 1960 Scotch Cup =

- Host city: Ayr, Edinburgh & Glasgow, Scotland
- Arena: Unknown
- Dates: March 18, 21–23, 1960
- Winner: Canada
- Curling club: Civil Service CC; Regina, Saskatchewan
- Skip: Ernie Richardson
- Third: Arnold Richardson
- Second: Garnet Richardson
- Lead: Wes Richardson
- Finalist: Scotland

The 1960 Scotch Cup was the second edition of what would later be the men's World Curling Championship. It was hosted in Ayr, Edinburgh and Glasgow, Scotland with Canada and Scotland being the two teams to compete in the competition. In the five game series it was Canada who defeated Scotland 5-0.

== Teams ==
| Canada | Scotland |
|---|---|
| Civil Service CC, Regina, Saskatchewan Skip: Ernie Richardson; Third: Arnold Richardson; Second: Garnet Richardson; Lead: Wes Richardson | Avondale Heather CC, Strathaven Skip: Hugh Neilson; Third: Watson Yuill; Second: Tom Yuill; Lead: Andrew Wilson |

== Standings ==
| Country | Skip | W | L |
|---|---|---|---|
| Canada | Ernie Richardson | 5 | 0 |
| Scotland | Hugh Neilson | 0 | 5 |

== Results ==
=== Draw 1 ===
March 18, Ayr

| Team | 1 | 2 | 3 | 4 | 5 | 6 | 7 | 8 | 9 | 10 | 11 | 12 | Final |
| Canada (Richardson) | 0 | 2 | 0 | 2 | 0 | 1 | 2 | 0 | 1 | 0 | 3 | 0 | 11 |
| Scotland (Neilson) | 1 | 0 | 2 | 0 | 2 | 0 | 0 | 1 | 0 | 1 | 0 | 1 | 8 |

=== Draw 2 ===
March 21, Edinburgh

| Team | 1 | 2 | 3 | 4 | 5 | 6 | 7 | 8 | 9 | 10 | 11 | 12 | Final |
| Canada (Richardson) | 2 | 2 | 0 | 3 | 0 | 1 | 0 | 2 | 2 | 0 | 2 | 0 | 14 |
| Scotland (Neilson) | 0 | 0 | 1 | 0 | 1 | 0 | 1 | 0 | 0 | 2 | 0 | 2 | 7 |

=== Draw 3 ===
March 22, Glasgow

| Team | 1 | 2 | 3 | 4 | 5 | 6 | 7 | 8 | 9 | 10 | 11 | 12 | Final |
| Canada (Richardson) | 0 | 1 | 2 | 0 | 2 | 1 | 0 | 0 | 0 | 1 | 2 | 0 | 9 |
| Scotland (Neilson) | 1 | 0 | 0 | 2 | 0 | 0 | 1 | 0 | 0 | 0 | 0 | 1 | 5 |

=== Draw 4 ===
March 23, Glasgow

| Team | 1 | 2 | 3 | 4 | 5 | 6 | 7 | 8 | 9 | 10 | 11 | 12 | Final |
| Canada (Richardson) | 0 | 1 | 1 | 0 | 0 | 0 | 1 | 2 | 0 | 2 | 0 | 1 | 8 |
| Scotland (Neilson) | 0 | 0 | 0 | 1 | 0 | 1 | 0 | 0 | 1 | 0 | 1 | 0 | 4 |

=== Draw 5 ===
March 23, Glasgow

| Team | 1 | 2 | 3 | 4 | 5 | 6 | 7 | 8 | 9 | 10 | 11 | 12 | Final |
| Canada (Richardson) | 0 | 1 | 0 | 0 | 4 | 0 | 1 | 1 | 1 | 2 | 2 | 4 | 16 |
| Scotland (Neilson) | 1 | 0 | 0 | 1 | 0 | 2 | 0 | 0 | 0 | 0 | 0 | 0 | 4 |

1960 Scotch Cup
Canada
2nd title
