= List of listed buildings in Avondale, South Lanarkshire =

This is a list of listed buildings in the parish of Avondale in South Lanarkshire, Scotland.

== List ==
Name	Location	Date listed	Geo-coordinates	Notes	Category	LB number	Image
Strathaven, 4 Kirk Street			55°40′35″N 4°03′51″W		C(S)	6613	Upload Photo
East Overton			55°40′59″N 4°03′16″W		C(S)	1272	Upload Photo
Lethame House Outbuildings And Gatepiers			55°40′38″N 4°05′23″W		B	1274	Upload Photo
Brae Farm			55°41′57″N 4°05′24″W		C(S)	1281	Upload Photo
Craigmill Former Powerloom Factory			55°39′55″N 4°02′55″W		B	1287	Upload Photo
Stobieside House And Gatepiers			55°37′56″N 4°11′24″W		B	1289	Upload Photo
Strathaven George Allan Park Bandstand			55°40′51″N 4°04′13″W		B	1301	Upload Photo
Strathaven Goodsburn Farm			55°40′17″N 4°03′39″W		C(S)	1303	Upload Photo
Strathaven 21 Green Street			55°40′40″N 4°03′59″W		C(S)	1305	Upload Photo
Strathaven 48 Townhead Street			55°40′33″N 4°04′10″W		B	1316	Upload Photo
Netherfield House And Stables			55°40′58″N 4°02′27″W		B	1323	Upload Photo
Strathaven 78 Kirk Street			55°40′28″N 4°04′08″W		B	1329	Upload Photo
Strathaven, Colinhill Road, Former Crosshill Annexe			55°40′29″N 4°04′20″W		C(S)	45578	Upload Photo
Laigh Netherfield			55°41′10″N 4°01′34″W		B	1273	Upload Photo
Low Drumclog			55°38′08″N 4°10′08″W		C(S)	1275	Upload Photo
Strathaven 61 Kirk Street			55°40′29″N 4°04′02″W		C(S)	1278	Upload Photo
Auchengilloch Monument			55°35′54″N 4°02′30″W		B	1279	Upload Photo
Avon Bridge At Waterhead From Road End			55°36′01″N 4°11′42″W		B	1280	Upload Photo
Burnbrae			55°39′12″N 4°02′38″W		C(S)	1282	Upload Photo
Strathaven 36 Barn Street			55°40′44″N 4°03′57″W		C(S)	1292	Upload Photo
Strathaven Castle Street Wilson Monument			55°40′39″N 4°03′46″W		B	1294	Upload Photo
Strathaven Kirk Street Sun Hotel			55°40′33″N 4°03′53″W		C(S)	1307	Upload Photo
Strathaven Stonehouse Road Trynlaw			55°40′40″N 4°03′28″W		B	1310	Upload Photo
Strathaven Hotel (Formerly Wester Overton)			55°41′04″N 4°03′43″W		B	1320	Upload Photo
Overfield House			55°41′03″N 4°02′53″W		C(S)	1325	Upload Photo
Overlethame			55°40′37″N 4°05′47″W		C(S)	1326	Upload Photo
Strathaven 15 Lethame Road			55°40′38″N 4°04′07″W		B	1332	Upload Photo
Strathaven, 8 Threestanes Road, John Hastie Museum Including Boundary Walls And Gatepiers			55°40′44″N 4°04′15″W		C(S)	50141	Upload Photo
Craig Bridge			55°39′55″N 4°02′56″W		B	1285	Upload Photo
Strathaven 12, 14, 16 Common Green			55°40′36″N 4°03′56″W		C(S)	1298	Upload Photo
Strathaven Green Street East Parish Church & Gatepiers			55°40′40″N 4°03′56″W		B	1306	Upload Photo
Strathaven, Strait Close Store Houses To Rear Of 2, 4 Common Green			55°40′35″N 4°03′54″W		C(S)	1311	Upload Photo
Strathaven 54 Townhead Street			55°40′32″N 4°04′13″W		C(S)	1317	Upload Photo
Trumpeter's Well At Hillhead Farm			55°39′01″N 4°07′51″W		C(S)	1322	Upload Photo
North Brownhill			55°39′36″N 4°09′01″W		C(S)	1324	Upload Photo
14-16 Townhead Street, Buck'shead Hotel, Strathaven, Including Outbuildings			55°40′36″N 4°04′04″W		C(S)	49858	Upload Photo
Strathaven, Kirk Street And Thomson Street, Former Strathaven Public Hall			55°40′32″N 4°04′00″W		C(S)	50142	Upload another image
Strathaven 1, 3, 5 Common Green			55°40′34″N 4°03′55″W		C(S)	1295	Upload Photo
Strathaven Dunavon			55°40′47″N 4°03′28″W		B	1300	Upload Photo
Strathaven 56 Townhead Street, Kiledin			55°40′32″N 4°04′14″W		C(S)	1318	Upload Photo
Udstonhead Tower Of Udstonhead			55°41′57″N 4°03′48″W		C(S)	1321	Upload Photo
Strathaven 42 Kirk Street And 5, 7 Wellbrae			55°40′33″N 4°03′55″W		B	1327	Upload Photo
Strathaven Stonehouse Road Avondale Castle			55°40′34″N 4°03′48″W		B	1333	Upload Photo
East Coldstream			55°41′40″N 4°04′21″W		C(S)	132	Upload Photo
Strathaven 23 Commercial Road Glengair			55°40′46″N 4°03′53″W		B	133	Upload Photo
Strathaven Boo-Backed Bridge			55°40′36″N 4°03′52″W		B	1293	Upload Photo
Strathaven 18, 20, 22 Common Green			55°40′36″N 4°03′57″W		C(S)	1299	Upload Photo
Strathaven, 4 And 6 (Meadowpark) Glasgow Road			55°40′45″N 4°03′59″W		B	1302	Upload Photo
Strathaven Kirkland Park Bridge			55°40′44″N 4°04′09″W		C(S)	1330	Upload Photo
East Newton Farm			55°40′01″N 4°04′00″W		B	1271	Upload Photo
Meikle Hareshaw			55°41′00″N 4°02′26″W		B	1276	Upload Photo
Strathaven Kirk Street Avondale Old Parish Church And Gatepiers			55°40′30″N 4°04′00″W		B	1277	Upload Photo
Calder Bridge At Caldermill			55°39′09″N 4°07′33″W		B	1283	Upload Photo
Coldwakning			55°38′09″N 4°09′42″W		C(S)	1284	Upload Photo
Craigmill Cottage			55°39′56″N 4°02′52″W		B	1286	Upload Photo
South Halls			55°36′25″N 4°08′39″W		C(S)	1288	Upload Photo
Strathaven 23, 23A Barn Street			55°40′44″N 4°03′59″W		C(S)	1290	Upload Photo
Strathaven 2 Townhead Street Rutherford's Shop			55°40′37″N 4°04′02″W		C(S)	1315	Upload Photo
Strathaven 20 Crosshill Road			55°40′36″N 4°04′28″W		C(S)	6687	Upload Photo
Dungavel Prison			55°36′36″N 4°07′53″W		C(S)	6612	Upload Photo
Strathaven 35, 37 Common Green			55°40′36″N 4°04′00″W		C(S)	1297	Upload Photo
Strathaven 17, 19 Green Street			55°40′40″N 4°03′59″W		B	1304	Upload Photo
Strathaven 39, 41 Kirk Street And Wing In Corney's Close			55°40′32″N 4°03′54″W		B	1308	Upload Photo
Strathaven Townhead Street West Church & Gatepiers			55°40′34″N 4°04′06″W		B	1314	Upload Photo
Strathaven Lauder Hall And Gatepiers			55°40′26″N 4°04′50″W		B	1331	Upload Photo
Strathaven Stonehouse Road Town Mill			55°40′35″N 4°03′44″W		B	1334	Upload Photo
Strathaven Stonehouse Road Dhu Crag			55°40′36″N 4°03′36″W		C(S)	134	Upload Photo
7, The Ward, Strathaven			55°40′41″N 4°03′52″W		C(S)	49197	Upload Photo
Craig Mill			55°39′56″N 4°02′53″W		B	1268	Upload Photo
Drumclog Battle Monument			55°37′51″N 4°11′05″W		B	1269	Upload Photo
Drumclog Church			55°37′28″N 4°09′40″W		B	1270	Upload Photo
Strathaven 33 Common Green			55°40′36″N 4°04′00″W		C(S)	1296	Upload Photo
Strathaven Stonehouse Rd Mill House			55°40′34″N 4°03′44″W		C(S)	1309	Upload Photo
Strathaven 10 Strait Close			55°40′35″N 4°03′54″W		C(S)	1312	Upload Photo
Strathaven Threestanes Road Brookfield			55°40′44″N 4°04′20″W		C(S)	1313	Upload Photo
Strathaven 50, 52, 54 Waterside Street			55°40′39″N 4°03′54″W		B	1319	Upload Photo
Strathaven 68 Kirk Street			55°40′32″N 4°03′59″W		C(S)	1328	Upload Photo

== Key ==
The scheme for classifying buildings in Scotland is:

- Category A: "buildings of national or international importance, either architectural or historic; or fine, little-altered examples of some particular period, style or building type."
- Category B: "buildings of regional or more than local importance; or major examples of some particular period, style or building type, which may have been altered."
- Category C: "buildings of local importance; lesser examples of any period, style, or building type, as originally constructed or moderately altered; and simple traditional buildings which group well with other listed buildings."

In March 2016 there were 47,288 listed buildings in Scotland. Of these, 8% were Category A, and 50% were Category B, with the remaining 42% being Category C.
