= Strathaven Academy =

Location
- Bowling Green Road; Strathaven, South Lanarkshire, ML10 6DP; Scotland; 55.67644°N 4.07101°W

Information
- Type: Comprehensive
- Motto: Latin: Labor Omnia Vincit; Work Conquers All
- Established: January 1905
- Authority: South Lanarkshire
- Gender: Co-educational
- Age: 11 to 18
- Enrollment: 985
- Houses: 5
- Colours: Claret & amber
- SEED Number: 8533830
- Website: http://www.strathaven.s-lanark.sch.uk

Strathaven Academy is a non-denominational secondary school in Strathaven, South Lanarkshire, Scotland.

== History ==
In 1902, Avondale School Board decided to merge two local primary schools; Crosshill and Ballgreen and create a new "Academy". The merge went ahead and the new Academy building was opened in January 1905 by Thomas McKay, Chairman of the school board.

The building was a red sandstone building with ornamental features such as vases on the roof, cupolas, school logo carved in the wall and a central hall. The hall had a solid oak roof, similar to a hammerbeam, a balcony running all the way around the perimeter, allowing access to the classrooms on the upper floor, staircases on either side of the hall. This building was demolished in 2007.

== Admissions ==
It has a roll of approximately 950 children. There are approximately 80 members of teaching staff and 20 in facilities management, administration and janitorial.

== School facilities ==
The new school building opened in 2009, replacing the previous one which had become dilapidated and out of date. The new building provides facilities for all departments, including PE facilities and an all-weather sports pitch.

== Alumni ==
- Stuart Braithwaite, musician
- Harry Cochrane, footballer
- Grant Stewart, International Scotland Rugby player

=== Grammar school ===
- Andy Stewart, Conservative MP from 1983-92 for Sherwood, and Chairman from 1992-98 of the Agricultural Training Board
