= Watson Yuill =

Scottish curler

- Curler

Team
- Curling club: Avondale Heather CC, Strathaven
- Skip: Hugh Neilson
- Third: Watson Yuill
- Second: Tom Yuill
- Lead: Andrew Wilson

Curling career
- World Championship: 1 (1960)
Medal record
Representing Scotland
Men's Curling
World Championships
Silver medal – second place	1960 Scotland	Team

Watson Yuill was the third man on the Avondale Heather CC (from Strathaven, Scotland) during the World Curling Championships known as the 1960 Scotch Cup, where Scottish team won silver medal. The team won The Rink Championship in 1960.
