= Andy Stewart (politician) =

British politician (1937–2013)

Member of Parliament for Sherwood
- In office 9 June 1983 – 16 March 1992
- Preceded by: Constituency created
- Succeeded by: Paddy Tipping

Personal details
- Born: Andrew Struthers Stewart; 27 May 1937 Lanarkshire, Scotland
- Died: 6 October 2013 (aged 76) Caunton, Nottinghamshire
- Party: Conservative

Andrew Struthers Stewart (27 May 1937 – 6 October 2013) was a British Conservative Party politician who served as member of parliament (MP) for Sherwood from 1983 to 1992.

== Early life ==
Born in Lanarkshire, Scotland, Stewart was educated at Strathaven Academy and West of Scotland Agricultural College. He chaired Strathaven Young Unionists in 1957–58.

== Political career ==
Having moved to Nottinghamshire to establish himself as a farmer, Stewart was elected to Nottinghamshire County Council in 1977, serving until he resigned on election to Parliament.

Elected for the coal mining constituency of Sherwood in 1983, Stewart was a strong supporter of those Nottinghamshire miners who continued working during the strike of 1984-5 and who went on to form the Union of Democratic Mineworkers.

He served as parliamentary private secretary to John MacGregor during the latter's tenure as Minister of Agriculture (1987–89), Secretary of State for Education and Science (1989–90) and Leader of the House of Commons (1990–92). He supported Margaret Thatcher when Michael Heseltine challenged for the leadership of the Conservative party in 1990. He was defeated in Sherwood by Labour's Paddy Tipping in 1992.

== Later career ==
After losing his seat, Stewart chaired the Agricultural Training Board and served on the Rural Development Commission. He was re-elected to the county council in 2002, serving until 2013. He was later the chairman of Hucknall Town F.C. before becoming the Honorary Life President.

== Death ==
Stewart died following a short illness, surrounded by his family, on 6 October 2013, aged 76, in Caunton, Nottinghamshire.
