= Gary Godden =

Nottinghamshire Police and Crime Commissioner
- Incumbent
- Assumed office 9 May 2024
- Preceded by: Caroline Henry

Personal details
- Born: June 1968 (age 57)
- Party: Labour

Gary Anthony Godden (born June 1968) is a Labour Party politician, and the Nottinghamshire Police and Crime Commissioner, since May 2024.

== Early life ==
Godden spent his formative years in Barnardo's care homes until he was adopted by his new parents at the age of seven.

He is the adopted son of Tony Godden, the Principal from 1981 to 1986 of Gainsborough College of Further Education, where he grew up. He attempted to work as a male model in his teens.

== Career ==
He has lived in Nottinghamshire for over 25 years.

With a career in public services for the NHS and the Police Service, Godden was a Police Officer for 15 years, working closely with the communities of Nottinghamshire.

In the 2019 United Kingdom general election, he was the Labour candidate in Charnwood.

In May 2024 he was elected Nottinghamshire Police and Crime Commissioner, beating the Tory incumbent Caroline Henry.
