= Grant Stewart (rugby union) =

Scotland international rugby union player

- Born: Grant Stewart; 28 February 1995 (age 31) Carluke, Scotland
- Height: 5 ft 11 in (1.80 m)
- Weight: 113 kg (249 lb; 17 st 11 lb)
- School: Strathaven Academy

Rugby union career
- Position: Hooker
Amateur team(s)
Years	Team	Apps	(Points)
?-2011	Strathaven		
2011-2013	Dalziel	17	(10)
2013 -	Glasgow Hawks		
Senior career
Years	Team	Apps	(Points)
2017-22	Glasgow Warriors	48	(45)
2022-23	Connacht	4	(0)
2024-	Glasgow Warriors	12	(10)
Provincial / State sides
Years	Team	Apps	(Points)
- Glasgow U20
Super Rugby
Years	Team	Apps	(Points)
2023–24	Ayrshire Bulls		
International career
Years	Team	Apps	(Points)
- Scotland U17
- Scotland U18
- Scotland U19
- Scotland Club XV
2019	Scotland	3	(0)

Grant Stewart (born 28 February 1995) is a Scotland international rugby union player who plays for Glasgow Warriors. He previously played for Connacht and Ayrshire Bulls. His usual position is at the Hooker position.

== Rugby Union career ==
=== Amateur career ===
Stewart played rugby for Strathaven RFC before moving onto Dalziel and then Glasgow Hawks.

=== Professional career ===
Stewart has played for the Glasgow U20 side.

Stewart was enrolled in the then BT Sport Scottish Rugby Academy as a Stage 3 player. Stage 3 players are aligned to a professional club and given regional support. The academy was later sponsored by Fosroc instead of BT Sport.

Stewart made his debut for Glasgow Warriors in their opening match of the 2017-18 season - against Northampton Saints at Bridgehaugh Park, Stirling on 19 August 2017. His competitive debut was on 14 January 2018 against Leinster. He became Glasgow Warrior No. 295.

It was announced on 20 December 2018 that Stewart had signed a professional contract with Glasgow Warriors and that he will graduate from the Scottish Rugby Academy on 1 January 2019.

After 48 caps and 9 tries, Stewart left Glasgow Warriors in the summer of 2022.

He was signed by Connacht on 3 August 2022.

He played for the Ayrshire Bulls in the Super Series before being signed up by Glasgow Warriors again on 25 April 2024.

=== International career ===
Stewart has played for the Scotland U17s, Scotland U18s and Scotland U19s age-grade sides.

On 16 January 2019 Gregor Townsend named three hookers among seven uncapped players, for his Scotland Six Nations squad. Stewart was among those selected.

Stewart earned his first senior Scotland cap against France in the Rugby World Cup warm up matches at Murrayfield Stadium on 24 August 2019. He followed that with 2 further caps against Georgia in 2019.

== Outside of rugby ==
Stewart's family own a haulage firm.
