= Paddy Tipping =

British Labour Party politician

Paddy Tipping CBE

Nottinghamshire Police and Crime Commissioner
- In office 22 November 2012 – 12 May 2021
- Deputy: Chris Cutland; Emma Foody
- Preceded by: Office established
- Succeeded by: Caroline Henry

Deputy Leader of the House of Commons
- In office 28 March 2007 – 27 June 2007
- Prime Minister: Tony Blair
- Preceded by: Nigel Griffiths
- Succeeded by: Helen Goodman
- In office 16 December 1999 – 7 June 2001
- Prime Minister: Tony Blair
- Preceded by: Office established
- Succeeded by: Stephen Twigg

Parliamentary Secretary for the Privy Council Office
- In office 16 December 1999 – 7 June 2001
- Prime Minister: Tony Blair
- Preceded by: Office established
- Succeeded by: Stephen Twigg

Member of Parliament for Sherwood
- In office 10 April 1992 – 12 April 2010
- Preceded by: Andrew Stewart
- Succeeded by: Mark Spencer

Personal details
- Born: 24 October 1949 (age 76) Halifax, West Yorkshire, England
- Party: Labour
- Education: University of Nottingham (BA, MA)

Simon Patrick Tipping CBE (born 24 October 1949) is a British politician who served as Member of Parliament (MP) for Sherwood from 1992 to 2010. A member of the Labour Party, he served as Police and Crime Commissioner for Nottinghamshire from 2012 to 2021.

== Early life ==
Tipping was born in Halifax. He went to Hipperholme Grammar School (then a state school) in Hipperholme in West Yorkshire. He gained a BA in Philosophy at Nottingham University in 1972 and an MA in Social Sciences in 1978. He was a social worker in Nottingham and Nottinghamshire from 1972 until 1979. Between 1979 and 1983 he was a Project Leader for the (Church of England) Children's Society in Nottingham. From 1981 to 1993 he was a Councillor on Nottinghamshire County Council.

== Parliamentary career ==
Tipping contested Rushcliffe in 1987. He took Sherwood from the Conservatives in 1992.

Tipping served in a number of junior government positions, becoming Parliamentary Private Secretary to Home Secretary Jack Straw in 1997. In 1999 he was then promoted to Deputy Leader of the House of Commons, and was appointed a Parliamentary Under Secretary of State at the Privy Council Office, where he was responsible for dealing with issues relating to the year 2000 computer date problem. Following this, Tipping became Chairman of the sub-committee on Environment, Food and Rural Affairs in 2001 and, after a period on the backbenches, in 2006 he again served as Parliamentary Private Secretary to Jack Straw.

On 23 October 2009, Tipping announced his decision to stand down at the next general election, following a period of ill health, including a heart attack suffered in June 2009.

== Police and Crime Commissioner ==
Tipping was elected as Nottinghamshire's Police and Crime Commissioner in the 2012 inaugural PCC election. He announced plans to pay a "pension" to cover medical bills and other expenses for retired police dogs, a move which dog handlers welcomed. He was re-elected for a second-term on 6 May 2016.

Tipping appointed Chris Cutland, previously executive director of Women's Aid in Nottingham, as his Deputy in November 2012. The appointment of Emma Foody as replacement, also previously with Women's Aid in Nottingham as a community ambassador, was confirmed in June 2020.

At the 2021 PCC election, he was defeated by Conservative Caroline Henry. Afterwards, he confirmed his intention to continue campaigning on behalf of the Labour group.

== Personal life ==
He married Irene Quinn on 8 January 1970 in Nottingham; she died in February 2011. They have two daughters.

Tipping is one of several vice-presidents of the Ramblers Association, and became Chairman of Nottinghamshire Community Foundation, a charitable organisation, in 2011.
