= Strathaven RFC =

Scottish rugby union club, based in Strathaven

(Scotland) Strathaven RFC
- Full name: Strathaven Rugby Football Club
- Union: Scottish Rugby Union
- Founded: 1984; 42 years ago
- Location: Strathaven, Scotland
- Region: South Lanarkshire
- Ground: Whiteshawgate Park
- President: Davy Naismith
- Coach: Grant Neilson
- Captain: Iain Grant
- League: West Division One
- 2025–26: West Division One, 3rd of 10
Team kit

Official website
- www.strathavenrfc.co.uk

Strathaven RFC are a rugby union team from the south Lanarkshire town of Strathaven. Strathaven 1st XV play in the West Regional League Division 2.

== History ==
Founded in 1984, Strathaven RFC play at Whiteshawgate - off Hamilton Road.

Strathaven Rugby and Strathaven Dynamo teamed up to form the Whiteshawgate 3G Sports Trust (W3ST) partnership and, in 2016, started installation of a floodlit, multi-sport, 3G, all-weather pitch.

The 3G facility, installed by Malcolm Sports Surfaces, was officially opened on 24 March 2017 by then Minister for Public Health, Women's Health and Sport, Aileen Campbell.

== Notable former player ==
=== Scotland international ===
Grant Stewart started his Rugby Union career at Strathaven RFC and has since gone on to represent Scotland

Hooker Grant Stewart played for Strathaven and Dalziel before moving to Glasgow Hawks and securing a place in the BT Sport Scottish Rugby Academy.

Stewart represented Scotland through the age grades, being capped at U17, U18 and U19 level, as well as the Club XV side.

Stewart joined Glasgow Warriors in 2017 as a member of the Fosroc Scottish Rugby Academy, before signing his first professional contract with the Warriors in December 2018. He remains with Warriors for the 2021/22 season.

== Honours ==
- Glasgow Warriors Community Hero of the Year 2023-24
  - Colin Dalgarno
