= Nottinghamshire Police and Crime Commissioner =

Elected official responsible for effective law enforcement in Nottinghamshire

- Incumbent; Gary Godden since 3 May 2024
- Police and crime commissioner of Nottinghamshire Police
- Reports to: Nottinghamshire Police and Crime Panel
- Appointer: Electorate of Nottinghamshire
- Term length: Four years
- Constituting instrument: Police Reform and Social Responsibility Act 2011
- Precursor: Nottinghamshire Police Authority
- Inaugural holder: Paddy Tipping
- Formation: 22 November 2012
- Deputy: Angela Kandola BEM, Deputy Police and Crime Commissioner
- Salary: £78,400 (as of April 2022)
- Website: www.nottinghamshire.pcc.police.uk

The Nottinghamshire Police and Crime Commissioner is the police and crime commissioner, an elected official tasked with setting out the way crime is tackled by Nottinghamshire Police in the English County of Nottinghamshire.

The incumbent is Gary Godden, representing the Labour Party. The post of deputy was announced in September 2024, after delays caused by "checks and due diligence".

== History ==
The post was created in November 2012, following an election held on 15 November 2012, and replaced the Nottinghamshire Police Authority. The inaugural incumbent Paddy Tipping was returned in 2012 and again in 2016.

Elections for the third term were scheduled for 6 May 2021, having been postponed from May 2020 due to COVID-19 restrictions, with the Conservative Party fielding a candidate for the first time in Caroline Henry, wife of Conservative MP Darren Henry.

The final candidate was confirmed as David Watts, a solicitor and a Nottinghamshire local Liberal Democrat ward councillor at Broxtowe Borough Council, with the Lib Dems also fielding a candidate for the first time.

Following the election of Henry, within days changes were instigated to scrap the role of Deputy Commissioner, citing a potential saving of up to £78,000. In late 2021, Henry announced the appointment of Sharon Caddell as "interim CEO".

As of January 2022, recruitment was underway for a chief executive officer with a salary of £86,630.

After becoming elected in 2024, Godden chose to reinstate the role of deputy commissioner nominating Angela Kandola. She was awarded the BEM in the 2018 New Year Honours list.

== List of Nottinghamshire Police and Crime Commissioners ==
Name	Political party	From	To
Paddy Tipping	Labour	22 November 2012	12 May 2021
Caroline Henry	Conservative	13 May 2021	8 May 2024
Gary Godden	Labour	9 May 2024	Incumbent

== Election results ==
=== 2024 ===
2024 Nottinghamshire police and crime commissioner election
Party	Candidate	Votes	%	±%
Labour Co-op	Gary Godden	119,355	52.1	+8.6
Conservative	Caroline Henry	77,148	33.7	−14.2
Liberal Democrats	David Watts	32,410	14.2	+5.5
Turnout		234,266	28.1	
Labour Co-op gain from Conservative		Swing		

=== 2021 ===
Nottinghamshire Police and Crime Commissioner election, 2021
Party	Candidate	1st round		2nd round			1st round votesTransfer votes, 2nd round
Party	Candidate	Total	Of round	Transfers	Total	Of round	1st round votesTransfer votes, 2nd round
Conservative	Caroline Henry	131,318	47.9%	7,340	138,658	51.36%	
Labour	Paddy Tipping*	119,271	43.5%	12,031	131,302	48.64%	
Liberal Democrats	David Watts	23,794	8.7%				
Turnout		274,383	34%				
Conservative gain from Labour							

=== 2016 ===
Nottinghamshire Police and Crime Commissioner election, 2016
Party	Candidate	1st round		2nd round			1st round votesTransfer votes, 2nd round
Party	Candidate	Total	Of round	Transfers	Total	Of round	1st round votesTransfer votes, 2nd round
Labour	Paddy Tipping	80,926	47.3%	8,823	89,749	61.3%	
Conservative	Anthony Harper	48,155	28.1%	7,950	56,105	38.7%	
UKIP	Fran Loi	20,320	11.9%				
Independent	Tony Bates	14,579	8.5%				
Independent	Jason Zadrozny	7,164	4.2%				
Turnout		171,144	21.4%				
Rejected ballots							
Total votes							
Registered electors							
Labour hold							

=== 2012 ===
Nottinghamshire Police and Crime Commissioner election, 2012
Party	Candidate	1st round		2nd round			1st round votesTransfer votes, 2nd round
Party	Candidate	Total	Of round	Transfers	Total	Of round	1st round votesTransfer votes, 2nd round
Labour	Paddy Tipping	57,356	43.13%	8,563	65,919	55.5%	
Independent	Malcolm Spencer	30,263	22.76%	22,526	52,789	44.5%	
Conservative	Tony Roberts	26,304	19.78%				
Independent	Raj Chandran	19,050	14.33%				
Turnout		132,973	16.42%				
Rejected ballots		2,769	2.04%				
Total votes		135,742	16.77				
Registered electors		809,594					
Labour win							
