= Strathaven Public Hall =

Municipal building in Strathaven, Scotland

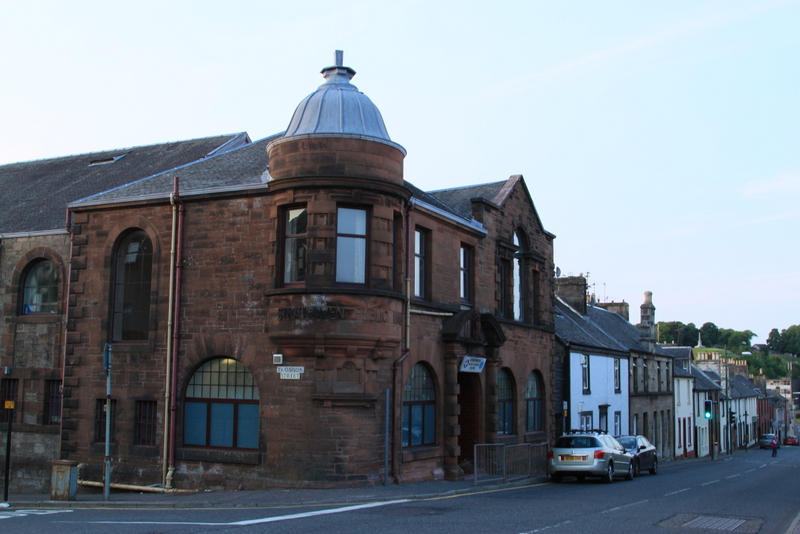
- Strathaven Public Hall

- Shown in South Lanarkshire
- 55.6754°N 4.0665°W
- Location: Kirk Street, Strathaven

History
- Built: 1896

Site notes
- Architect: Alexander Cullen
- Architectural style: Baroque Revival style

Listed Building – Category C(S)
- Official name: Former Strathaven Public Hall, Kirk Street and Thomson Street, Strathaven
- Designated: 9 August 2005
- Reference no.: LB50142

Strathaven Public Hall, also referred to as the Old Town Hall, Strathaven, is a municipal building in Kirk Street, Strathaven, South Lanarkshire, Scotland. The structure, which serves as a scout and guide centre, is a Category C listed building.

== History ==
Following significant population growth in the Strathaven area in the late 19th century, largely associated with the weaving and brewing industries, a group of local businessmen decided to form a company, known as the "Strathaven Public Hall Company", to finance and commission a new public hall for the town. A memorial stone was laid by Lieutenant Colonel Robert King Stewart, Grand Master of the Middle Ward of Lanarkshire, with full masonic rites, on 2 November 1895. The new building was designed by Alexander Cullen in the Baroque Revival style, built in red sandstone with ashlar dressings and was completed in 1896.

The design involved an asymmetrical main frontage of four bays facing onto Kirk Street. The second bay on the left featured a recessed doorway with a fanlight and a Gibbs surround formed by rusticated Doric order columns supporting an open pediment and a small wrought iron balcony bearing the monogram "SPH". The other bays on the ground floor were fenestrated by Diocletian windows, while the first floor was fenestrated by single windows in the two bays on the left, and by a Venetian window with a Gibbs surround across the two bays on the right. The Venetian window was surmounted by a stepped gable. At the left-hand corner there was a corbeled tower with three windows, all with Gibbs surrounds, surmounted by an ogee-shaped dome. Internally, the principal rooms were the main assembly hall, with seating capacity of 600 people, and the lesser hall, with a seating capacity of 130 people.

The building operated as a community events venue showing films and hosting dances for much of the 20th century until it closed in 1969. It then remained vacant until it was acquired by the local scouts and guides for use as a scout and guide centre in the mid-1970s. A programme of refurbishment works, carried out to a design by Haswell-Smith & Partners, was completed at that time. The company which had originally developed the building was then wound up and liquidated in 1977.

== See also ==
- List of listed buildings in Avondale, South Lanarkshire
