= Strathaven Castle =

Coordinates: 55.67661°N 4.06407°W

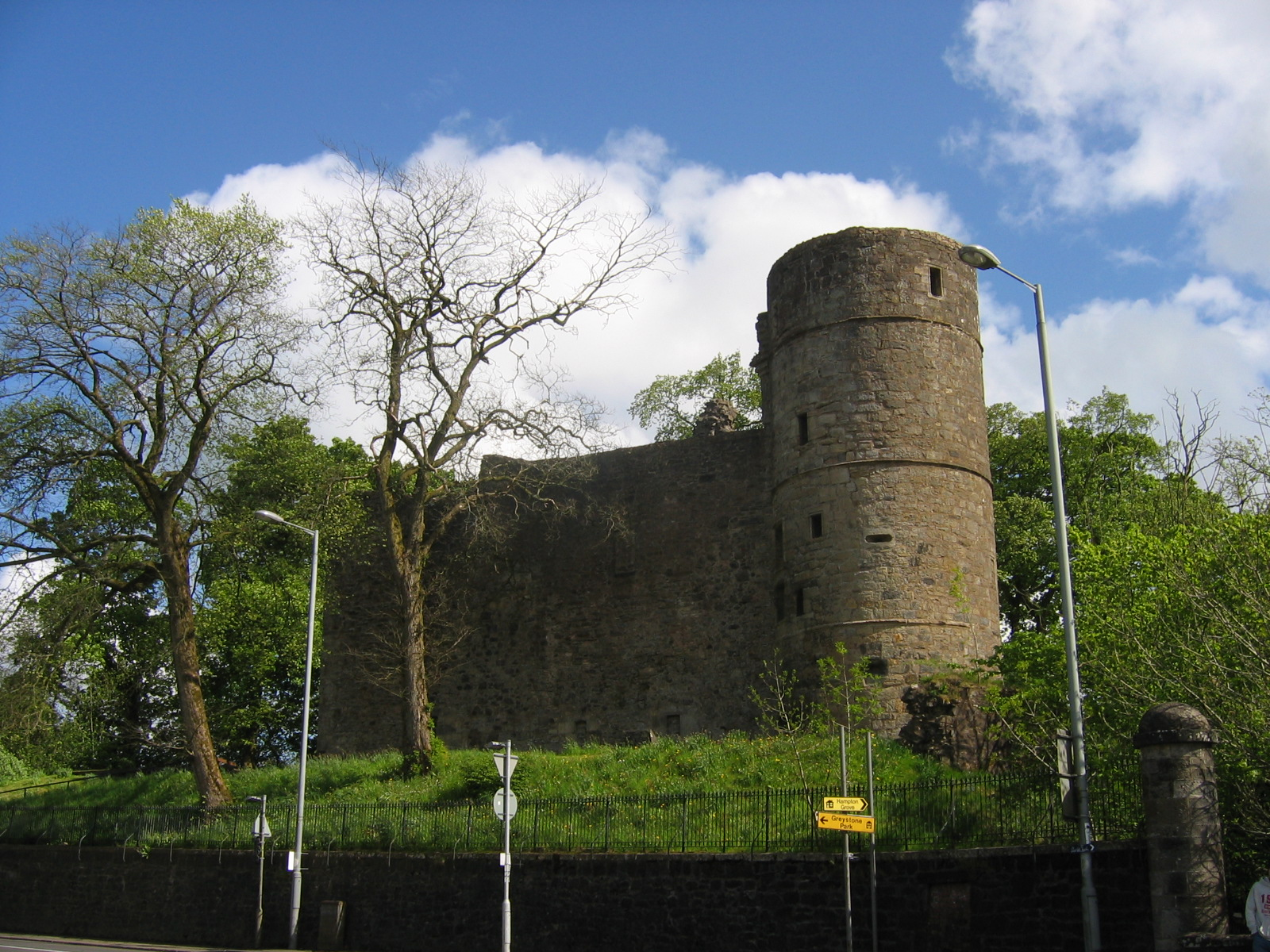
- Strathaven Castle above the A71
- Interactive map of the Strathaven Castle area

General information
- Location: South Lanarkshire, Strathaven, Scotland
- Completed: 1350

Technical details
- Size: 11.2m by 21.2m

Strathaven Castle is located in the centre of the small town of Strathaven, in South Lanarkshire, Scotland. The ruin is closed to the public and has been for 5 years. A Friends of Strathaven Castle Group was set up in February 2023 to promote the repair and renewed access to the towns major landmark.

The castle can be found at grid reference NS703445. Also known as Avondale Castle, the ruin and mound is now a Scheduled Ancient Monument.

== History ==
The origins of the castle are obscure, but it is believed to have been built around 1350 by the Bairds, on a bend of the Powmillon Burn. Later the castle passed to the Sinclairs and then to the Earls of Douglas. After the suppression of the Earls of Douglas by James II in 1455, the castle was sacked and slighted. Little or nothing of the early castle remains.

In 1457 Strathaven was granted to Sir Andrew Stewart, an illegitimate grandson of Murdoch Stewart, Duke of Albany. Stewart, who later became Lord Avondale, either rebuilt the earlier castle, or built a new castle on the same site. In 1534 it passed to Sir James Hamilton of Finnart, who expanded the buildings. A letter of 1559 mentions that it was here, at 'Straverin', that Master Patrick Buchanan, brother of George Buchanan, taught the children of Regent Arran.

It changed hands one last time in 1611, when the castle was sold to James, Marquis of Hamilton. The last occupant was Anne, Duchess of Hamilton (1632–1716), whose main residence was Hamilton Palace. The castle was abandoned in 1717.

== The castle ==
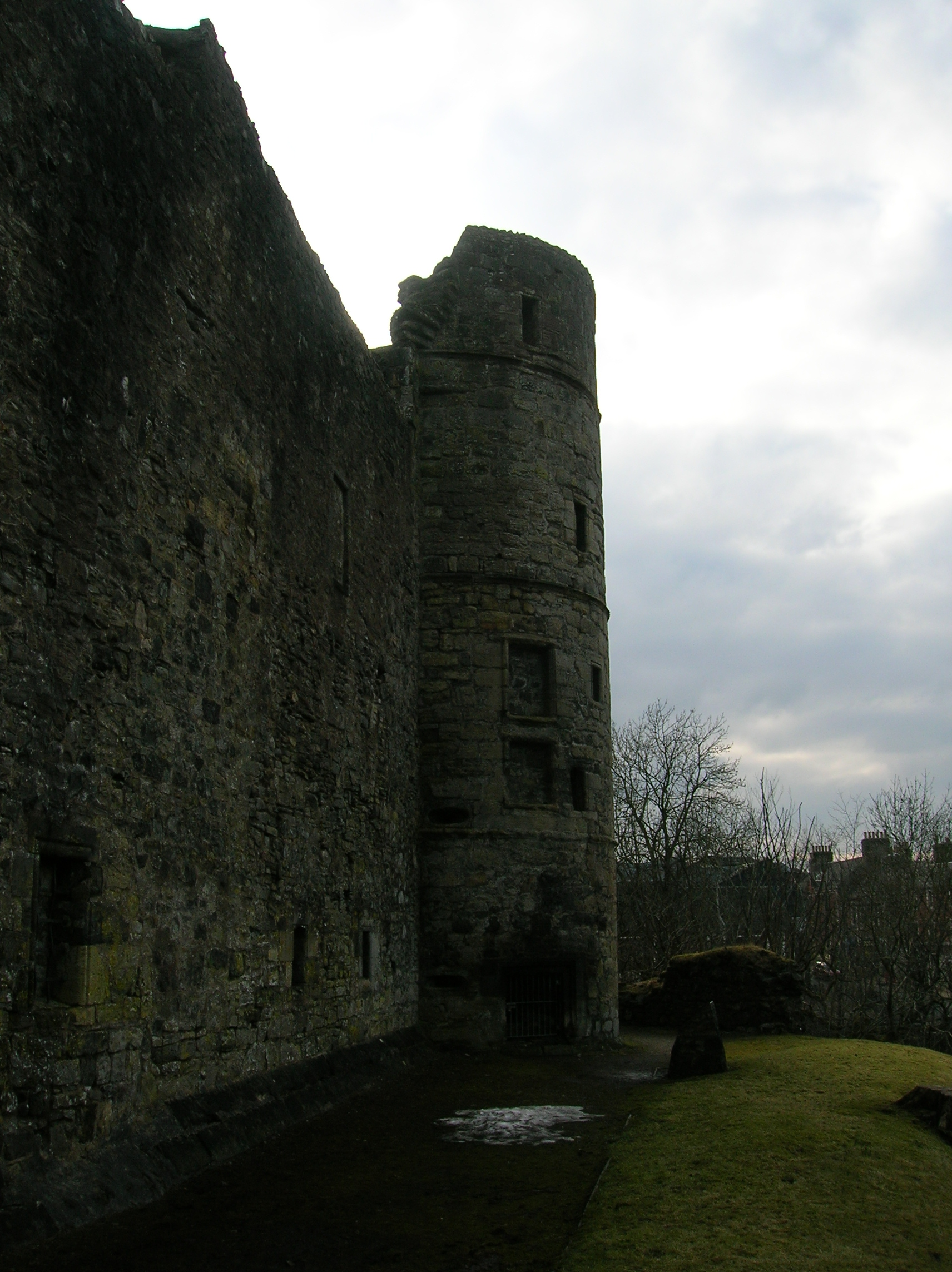
A view of the west tower.

Strathaven Castle is built on a rocky, partly artificial mound, and was defended to the east, south and west by the steep banks of the Powmillon Burn. A barmkin surrounded the top of the mound, traces of which remain to the west of the castle.

The castle comprised a three-storey rectangular block, around 11.2m by 21.2m, with a four-storey round tower at the north-west corner, and a small projecting wing at the south-east. Of this, the north wall and the tower remain almost complete, with fragments of the other walls. Internally, the remains of a collapsed basement vault can be seen.

Modern concrete infill has obscured much of the original detail, although a remnant of 15th-century-style corbelling remains visible. The round tower has several wide gunloops, and was probably added in the 16th century, and incorporates an improbably low entrance. Salter (1993) concludes that, although the door must originally have been larger, it "does not appear to have had a lower threshold, as a plinth continues below".

When part of the castle walls collapsed, or were demolished, a human skeleton was supposedly found. An information board outside the castle expands on the story:

"According to tradition, the wife of a past lord so greatly displeased her husband that she was walled up alive in part of the Castle wall. Nothing is recorded of her crime, yet it is said that she was led into a small purpose-built niche, blessed by a priest, given some food and water, and then walled up forever. When a portion of the walls fell down in the middle of the 19th Century human bones were discovered, giving some credence to this story.".

The information board records the local tradition that several ley tunnels run from the castle to the Sweetie's Brae, the Mill brae, and to the tower. When the road was built below the castle no sign of these tunnels was found.
