= Sherwood Forest (constituency) =

UK Parliament constituency (since 1983)

Coordinates: 53.07°N 1.13°W

- County constituency for the House of Commons
- Interactive map of boundaries from 2024
- Location within the East Midlands
- County: Nottinghamshire
- Electorate: 76,543 (March 2020)
- Major settlements: Hucknall, Ollerton, Ravenshead, Calverton

Current constituency
- Created: 1983
- Member of Parliament: Michelle Welsh (Labour)
- Seats: One
- Created from: Newark, Carlton, Ashfield

Sherwood Forest is a constituency (Note: A county constituency (for the purposes of election expenses and type of returning officer)) represented in the House of Commons of the UK Parliament since 2024 by Michelle Welsh, of the Labour Party. (Note: As with all constituencies, the constituency elects one Member of Parliament (MP) by the first past the post system of election at least every five years.) The constituency's name is shared with Sherwood Forest, which is in the area.

The constituency was formerly known as Sherwood. It was renamed as a result of the 2023 review of Westminster constituencies, with minor boundary changes. It was first contested under the new name at the 2024 general election.

== Constituency profile ==
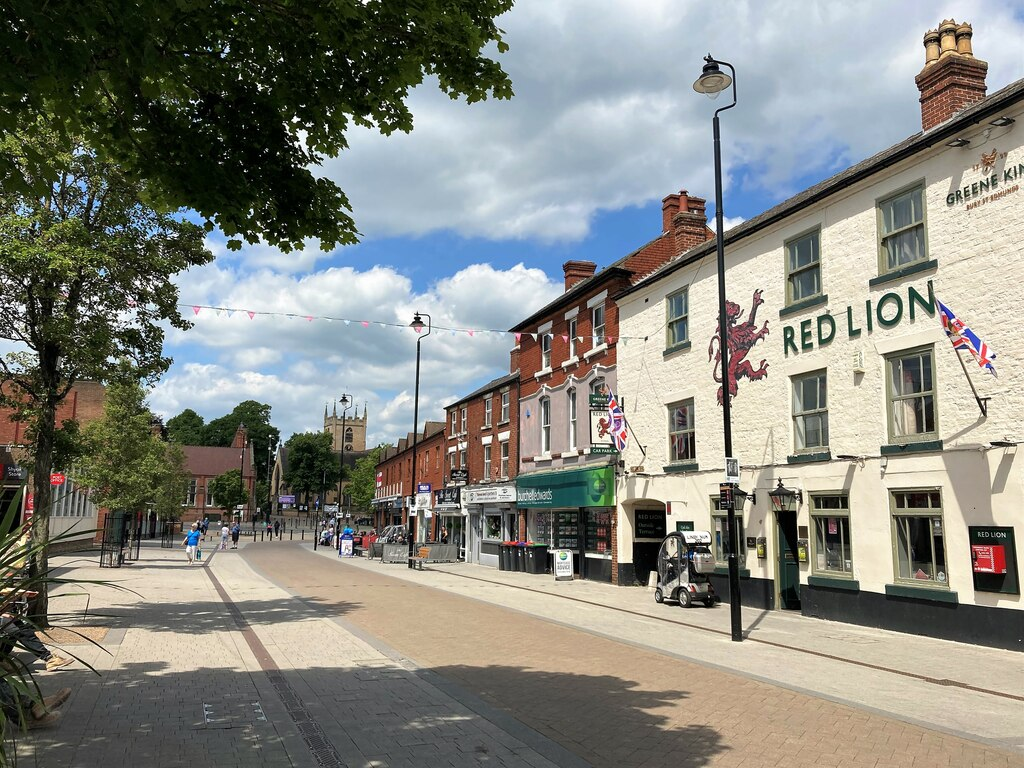
High Street, Hucknall

Sherwood Forest is a constituency in Nottinghamshire in the East Midlands of England, covering parts of the Newark and Sherwood, Gedling and Ashfield districts. Its largest settlement is the town of Hucknall, which has a population of around 38,000. Other settlements include the town of New Ollerton and the villages of Calverton, Ravenshead, Blidworth, Rainworth, Farnsfield, Bilsthorpe, Clipstone and Edwinstowe. The constituency is named after the ancient Sherwood Forest, the remnants of which are located here.

This is a mostly rural constituency with most residents living in Hucknall or in large villages. Many of these settlements have a history of coal mining, especially Hucknall and its surroundings which hosted several mines. Hucknall today largely serves as a commuter town for Nottingham; it is located around 6 miles (9.7 km) north of Nottingham city centre. There is some deprivation in Hucknall and the former mining settlements of Blidworth and New Ollerton. The rural areas are wealthier, especially Ravenshead which is highly-affluent and contains many large, detached houses. House prices across the constituency are generally similar to the rest of the East Midlands but lower than the UK average.

Sherwood Forest has a below-average proportion of young adults and an above-average retired population. Residents have average rates of income, high levels of homeownership, and the child poverty rate is in line with the rest of the UK. They generally have below-average levels of education and a high proportion work in the health, accommodation and construction sectors. The percentage of residents claiming unemployment benefits is low. White people made up 95% of the population at the 2021 census.

At the local district council level, the former mining villages are mostly represented by the Labour Party, the wealthier rural villages by Conservatives and Hucknall by localists. At the county council, which held elections more recently (in 2025), most of the constituency elected Reform UK councillors. Voters in Sherwood Forest strongly supported leaving the European Union in the 2016 referendum; an estimated 63% voted in favour of Brexit compared to the UK-wide figure of 52%.

== Boundaries ==
=== Historic (Sherwood) ===
1983–1997: The District of Newark wards of Bilsthorpe, Blidworth, Boughton, Clipstone, Dover Beck, Edwinstowe, Farnsfield, Fishpool, Lowdham, Ollerton North, Ollerton South, Rainworth, and Rufford, the District of Ashfield wards of Hucknall Central, Hucknall East, Hucknall North, and Hucknall West, and the Borough of Gedling wards of Bestwood St Albans (Bestwood Village only), Calverton, Lambley, Newstead, and Woodborough.

Map of boundaries 2010-2024

1997–2010: The District of Newark and Sherwood wards of Bilsthorpe, Blidworth, Boughton, Clipstone, Dover Beck, Edwinstowe, Farnsfield, Lowdham, Ollerton North, Ollerton South, Rainworth, and Rufford, the District of Ashfield wards of Hucknall Central, Hucknall East, Hucknall North, and Hucknall West, and the Borough of Gedling wards of Bestwood Park, Calverton, Lambley, Newstead, Ravenshead, and Woodborough.

2010–2024 The District of Newark and Sherwood wards of Bilsthorpe, Blidworth, Boughton, Clipstone, Edwinstowe, Farnsfield, Ollerton, and Rainworth, the District of Ashfield wards of Hucknall Central, Hucknall East, Hucknall North, and Hucknall West, and the Borough of Gedling wards of Bestwood Village, Calverton, Lambley, Newstead, Ravenshead, and Woodborough.

=== Current (Sherwood Forest) ===
Further to the 2023 review of Westminster constituencies, which came into effect for the 2024 general election, the composition of the constituency is as follows (as they existed on 1 December 2020):

- The District of Ashfield wards of: Hucknall Central; Hucknall North; Hucknall South; Hucknall West.
- The Borough of Gedling wards of: Calverton; Newstead Abbey.
- The District of Newark and Sherwood wards of: Bilsthorpe; Boughton; Dover Beck; Edwinstowe & Clipstone; Farnsfield; Lowdham; Ollerton; Rainworth North & Rufford; Rainworth South & Blidworth.

The constituency saw minor boundary changes, primarily due to the redrawing of local authority ward boundaries.

The constituency is in central Nottinghamshire, covering parts of three local government authorities: Hucknall in the Ashfield district, parts of the Gedling borough, and the western part of the Newark and Sherwood district, the largest geographical area of the seat.

== History ==
On the constituency's creation in 1983, Andy Stewart gained the seat for the Conservatives in their landslide victory that year with a small majority of 658. The Nottinghamshire miners drifted further from Labour during the 1984 strike and Stewart was re-elected with an increased majority in 1987. However, in 1992 the seat was gained for Labour by Paddy Tipping, who held it until he retired in 2010, when the seat was regained for the Conservatives by Mark Spencer, by a majority of 214. In 2015, Spencer's lead over the second placed candidate increased to 4,647 votes. This further increased in 2017 and another big swing to the Conservatives in 2019 saw Spencer's majority increase to 16,186, the first time a Conservative had a five-figure majority in the seat.

== Members of Parliament ==
Newark, Carlton and Ashfield prior to 1983

Election	Member	Party
1983	Andy Stewart	Conservative
1992	Paddy Tipping	Labour
2010	Sir Mark Spencer	Conservative
2024	Michelle Welsh	Labour

== Elections ==
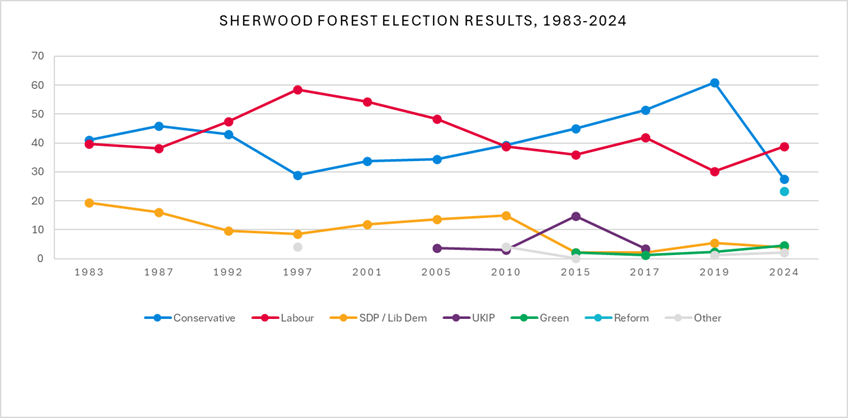
Sherwood Forest election results 1983-2024

=== Elections in the 2020s ===
General election 2024: Sherwood Forest
Party	Candidate	Votes	%	±%
Labour	Michelle Welsh	18,841	38.7	+9.2
Conservative	Mark Spencer	13,398	27.5	−33.3
Reform	Helen O'Hare	11,320	23.3	N/A
Green	Sheila Greatrex-White	2,216	4.6	+2.0
Liberal Democrats	David Dobbie	1,838	3.8	−1.9
Independent	Lee Waters	864	1.8	N/A
Independent	Jeremy Spry	183	0.4	N/A
Majority		5,443	11.2	N/A
Turnout		48,660	61.9	−5.7
Registered electors		78,894		
Labour gain from Conservative		Swing	+21.2	

Lee Waters was selected to stand by the Ashfield Independents.

=== Elections in the 2010s ===
General election 2019: Sherwood
Party	Candidate	Votes	%	±%
Conservative	Mark Spencer	32,049	60.8	▲9.3
Labour	Jerry Hague	15,863	30.1	▼11.7
Liberal Democrats	Tim Ball	2,883	5.5	▲3.4
Green	Esther Cropper	1,214	2.3	▲1.1
Independent	Simon Rood	700	1.3	New
Majority		16,186	30.7	▲21.0
Turnout		52,709	67.6	▼2.6
Conservative hold		Swing	▲10.5	

General election 2017: Sherwood
Party	Candidate	Votes	%	±%
Conservative	Mark Spencer	27,492	51.5	▲6.5
Labour	Mike Pringle	22,294	41.8	▲5.9
UKIP	Stuart Bestwick	1,801	3.4	▼11.2
Liberal Democrats	Becky Thomas	1,113	2.1	▼0.1
Green	Morris Findley	664	1.2	▼1.0
Majority		5,198	9.7	▲0.6
Turnout		53,364	70.2	▲1.1
Conservative hold		Swing	▲0.3	

General election 2015: Sherwood
Party	Candidate	Votes	%	±%
Conservative	Mark Spencer	22,833	45.0	+5.8
Labour	Léonie Mathers	18,186	35.9	−2.9
UKIP	Sally Chadd	7,399	14.6	+11.6
Green	Lydia Davies-Bright	1,108	2.2	New
Liberal Democrats	Dan Mosley	1,094	2.2	−12.7
Class War	Dave Perkins	78	0.2	New
Majority		4,647	9.1	+8.7
Turnout		50,698	69.1	+0.2
Conservative hold		Swing	+4.4	

General election 2010: Sherwood
Party	Candidate	Votes	%	±%
Conservative	Mark Spencer	19,211	39.2	+5.8
Labour	Emilie Oldknow	18,997	38.8	−10.6
Liberal Democrats	Kevin Moore	7,283	14.9	+1.4
BNP	James North	1,754	3.6	New
UKIP	Margot Parker	1,490	3.0	−0.7
NOTA (None of the Above)	Russ Swan	219	0.4	New
Majority		214	0.4	N/A
Turnout		48,954	68.9	+7.1
Conservative gain from Labour		Swing	+8.2	

=== Elections in the 2000s ===
General election 2005: Sherwood
Party	Candidate	Votes	%	±%
Labour	Paddy Tipping	22,824	48.4	−5.8
Conservative	Bruce Laughton	16,172	34.3	+0.5
Liberal Democrats	Peter Harris	6,384	13.5	+1.6
UKIP	Moritz Dawkins	1,737	3.7	New
Majority		6,652	14.1	−6.3
Turnout		47,117	62.8	+2.1
Labour hold		Swing	−3.1	

General election 2001: Sherwood
Party	Candidate	Votes	%	±%
Labour	Paddy Tipping	24,900	54.2	−4.3
Conservative	Brandon Lewis	15,527	33.8	+5.0
Liberal Democrats	Peter Harris	5,473	11.9	+3.3
Majority		9,373	20.4	−9.3
Turnout		45,900	60.7	−14.9
Labour hold		Swing		

=== Elections in the 1990s ===
General election 1997: Sherwood
Party	Candidate	Votes	%	±%
Labour	Paddy Tipping	33,071	58.5	+11.0
Conservative	Roland Spencer	16,259	28.8	−14.1
Liberal Democrats	Bruce Moult	4,889	8.6	−1.0
Referendum	Lee Slack	1,882	3.3	New
BNP	Paul Ballard	432	0.8	New
Majority		16,812	29.7	+25.1
Turnout		56,533	75.6	−9.9
Labour hold		Swing		

General election 1992: Sherwood
Party	Candidate	Votes	%	±%
Labour	Paddy Tipping	29,788	47.5	+9.3
Conservative	Andy Stewart	26,878	42.9	−3.0
Liberal Democrats	JW Howard	6,039	9.6	−6.4
Majority		2,910	4.6	N/A
Turnout		62,705	85.5	+3.6
Labour gain from Conservative		Swing	+6.2	

=== Elections in the 1980s ===
General election 1987: Sherwood
Party	Candidate	Votes	%	±%
Conservative	Andy Stewart	26,816	45.9	+4.9
Labour	William Bach	22,321	38.2	−1.5
SDP	Stuart Thompstone	9,343	16.0	−3.3
Majority		4,495	7.7	+6.4
Turnout		58,480	81.9	+5.6
Conservative hold		Swing		

General election 1983: Sherwood
Party	Candidate	Votes	%	±%
Conservative	Andy Stewart	21,595	41.0	
Labour	William Bach	20,937	39.7	
SDP	Margaret E. Cooper	10,172	19.3	
Majority		658	1.3	
Turnout		52,704	76.3	
Conservative win (new seat)				

== See also ==
- Parliamentary constituencies in Nottinghamshire
