= Darren Henry =

British politician (born 1968)

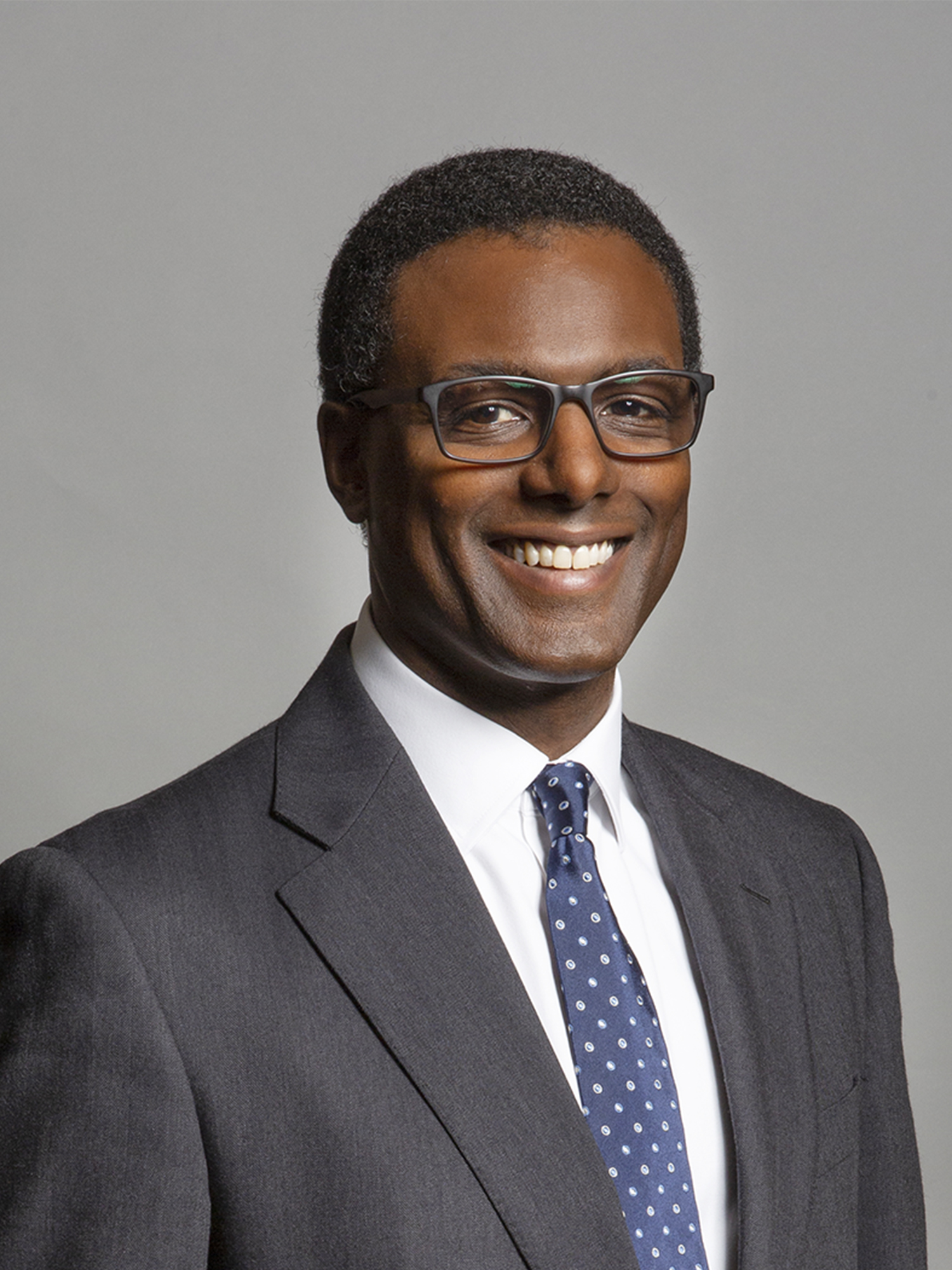
- Official portrait, 2020

Assistant Government Whip
- In office 20 September 2022 – 27 October 2022
- Prime Minister: Liz Truss

Member of Parliament for Broxtowe
- In office 12 December 2019 – 30 May 2024
- Preceded by: Anna Soubry
- Succeeded by: Juliet Campbell

Personal details
- Born: Darren George Henry; 4 August 1968 (age 58) Bedford, Bedfordshire, England
- Party: Reform UK (since 2026)
- Other political affiliations: Conservative (until 2026)
- Spouse: Caroline Henry
- Children: 2
- Education: University of Lincoln (BSc)
- Occupation: Politician; air force officer
- Website: www.darrenhenry.org.uk

Military service
- Allegiance: United Kingdom
- Branch/service: Royal Air Force
- Years of service: 1987–2013
- Rank: Squadron Leader

Darren George Henry (born 4 August 1968) is a British former Conservative Party politician who served as the Member of Parliament (MP) for Broxtowe from 2019 until his defeat in 2024. Henry briefly served as an Assistant Government Whip from September to October 2022.

== Early life and career ==
Darren Henry was born on 4 August 1968 in Bedford, to a Jamaican-born father, Harry. His mother, Gloria, was from Trinidad. Henry was privately educated at Rushmoor School. He served in the Royal Air Force, and in 8 April 1993, when he was serving as a corporal, was commissioned as a flying officer in the supply branch, with seniority from 28 July 1992. He was promoted to flight lieutenant on 28 July 1996 and to squadron leader on 1 January 2007.

== Political career ==
In early 2014, Henry joined the Conservatives, noting that whilst campaigning was possible in military service it had not occurred to him to do so up until this point. He aided Robert Jenrick in his campaign to win the 2014 Newark by-election.

Henry sought nomination to be the Conservative candidate in North West Hampshire, losing out to former Deputy Mayor of London Kit Malthouse.

Prior to the 2015 general election, he was selected as the Conservative candidate for Wolverhampton North East. At the election Henry came second with 29.9% of the vote behind the incumbent Labour MP Emma Reynolds.

Henry served as a parish councillor in Shrewton, Wiltshire before resigning in September 2019. From May 2017 until January 2020 Henry was also a Conservative member of the Wiltshire Council unitary authority.

In early 2019, Henry was shortlisted to be Wiltshire Police and Crime Commissioner but lost the selection to fellow Wiltshire councillor Jonathon Seed in April 2019, whose subsequent election became void, as it later emerged that he had a previous conviction, which was not disclosed.

In summer 2019, he was shortlisted, along with Tony Devenish and Felicity Buchan, for the ultra-marginal West London seat of Kensington. Henry failed to be selected, losing out to Felicity Buchan.

== Parliamentary career ==
Henry was selected as the Conservative prospective parliamentary candidate for Broxtowe in September 2019. At a 2019 general election hustings, Henry said that he might introduce a private member's bill for a ban on payday loans advertising, and suggested that food bank users needed help understanding money and budgeting. At the same hustings he stated; "When people are really, really down, and when people haven't got the money, one of the things they can look to do is to get a payday loan or something like that". This led to criticism from the audience.

During the election campaign, Henry is said to have leveraged an existing relationship with Robert Jenrick to have Jenrick commit to funding Stapleford (a ward within Broxtowe) with £25 million, but only if Henry won the seat and the Conservative party won a majority.

At the 2019 general election, Henry was elected to Parliament as MP for Broxtowe with 48.1% of the vote and a majority of 5,331.

In his maiden speech made on 25 June 2020, which was also in the week marking 72 years since the arrival of the Windrush generation to the UK, Henry spoke negatively of Labour for its representation of immigrants and those of the Windrush generation. Henry spoke of his pride in being the first Conservative parliamentarian of West Indian heritage. In July 2020, in a debate on the Windrush Lessons Learned Review, Henry used a question to state "party politics is shameful" and also used the opportunity to criticise Labour for not working with the Government to "right the wrongs of Windrush".

In March 2021, Henry apologised after a member of his staff was alleged to have turned up at the home of a blogger to get him to take down an article. Henry said he was unaware the incident had happened until it was published online.

In January 2022, a briefing released by the TaxPayers' Alliance revealed Henry to be "Britain's most expensive MP..." after £280,936 of expense claims during the 2020/2021 financial year.

Following the resignation of 50 ministers and aides from the service of Prime Minister Boris Johnson on 7 July 2022, Henry reaffirmed his support for the Prime Minister.

In 2026, Henry and his wife both defected to Reform UK. In June 2026, they were both blocked by the party from standing as parliamentary candidates.

== Personal life ==
Darren Henry is married to Caroline Henry, the former Nottinghamshire Police and Crime Commissioner for the Conservative Party from 2021 until 2024. She gained notoriety in 2022 for appearing in court and being handed a driving ban after being caught breaking the speed limit five times in 12 weeks in various locations across the county. In spite of this, she was selected as the Conservative candidate for Nottingham North and Kimberley in the 2024 general election. They both defected to Reform UK in 2026, and applied to become parliamentary candidates for Reform, but were blocked from doing so.

Parliament of the United Kingdom
Preceded by Anna Soubry	Member of Parliament for Broxtowe; 2019–2024	Succeeded by Juliet Campbell
