= Strathaven =

Market town in South Lanarkshire, Scotland

Coordinates: 55.677°N 4.065°W

Strathaven: Scottish Gaelic: Srath Aibhne; Scots: Straiven
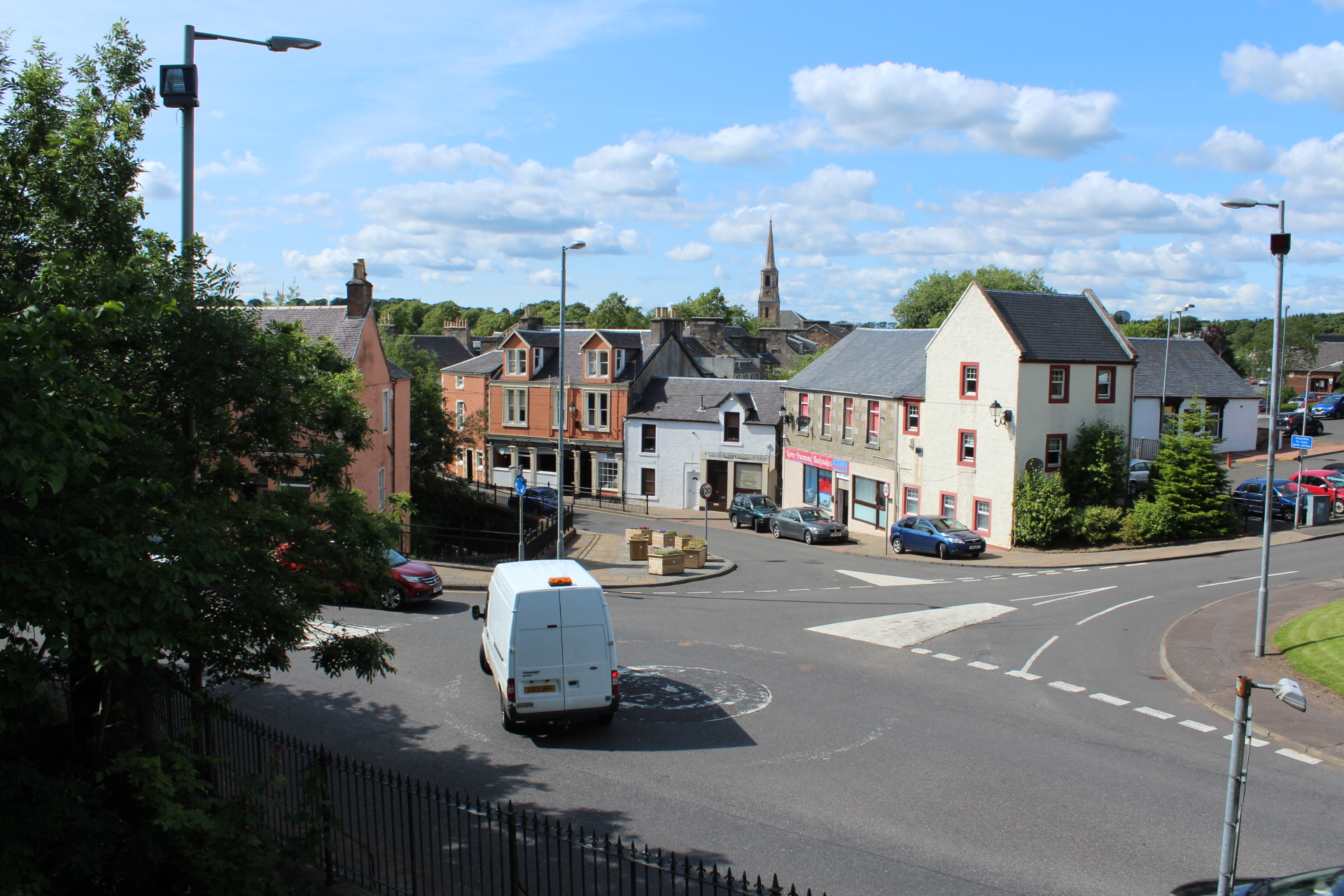

- Location within South Lanarkshire
- Population: 8,339
  - Edinburgh: 39 mi (63 km)
  - London: 330 mi (531 km)
- Council area: South Lanarkshire
- Lieutenancy area: Lanarkshire
- Country: Scotland
- Sovereign state: United Kingdom
- Post town: STRATHAVEN
- Postcode district: ML10
- Dialling code: 01357
- Police: Scotland
- Fire: Scottish
- Ambulance: Scottish
- UK Parliament: East Kilbride and Strathaven
- Scottish Parliament: Clydesdale

Strathaven (/ˈstreɪvən/ STRAY-ven; from Scottish Gaelic: Srath Aibhne [s̪t̪ɾah ˈajnə]) is a historic market town in South Lanarkshire, Scotland and is the largest settlement in Avondale. It is 7.5 kilometres (4 3/4 miles) south of Hamilton. (Note: Measured as the bird flies from the edges of the built-up areas) The Powmillon Burn runs through the town centre, and joins the Avon Water to the east of the town.

The population in the 2022 census was 8,339. The town was granted a royal charter in 1450, making it a burgh of barony. The A71, which connects Edinburgh and Irvine, passes through the town.

== History ==
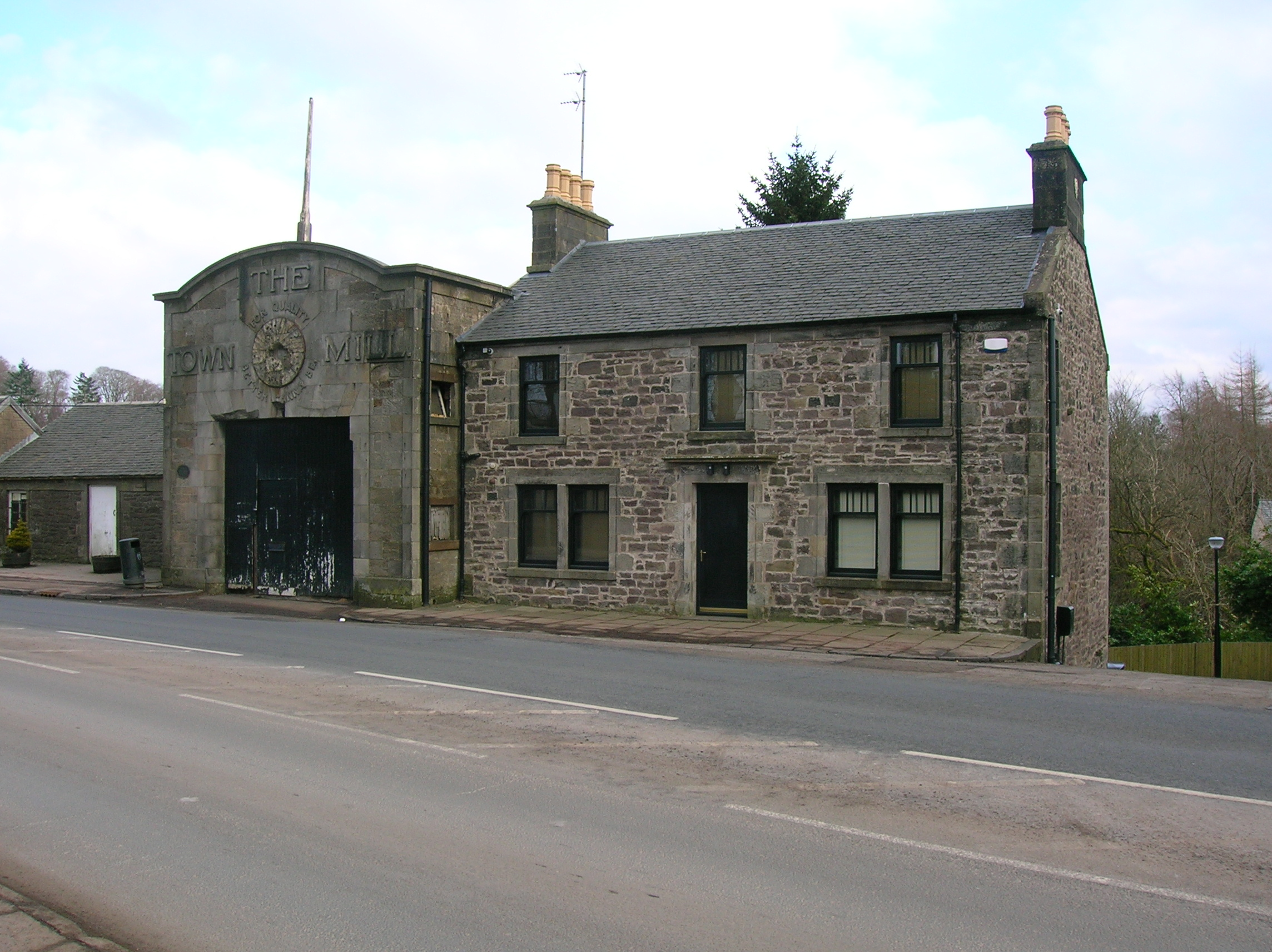
The Town Mill and Miller's house

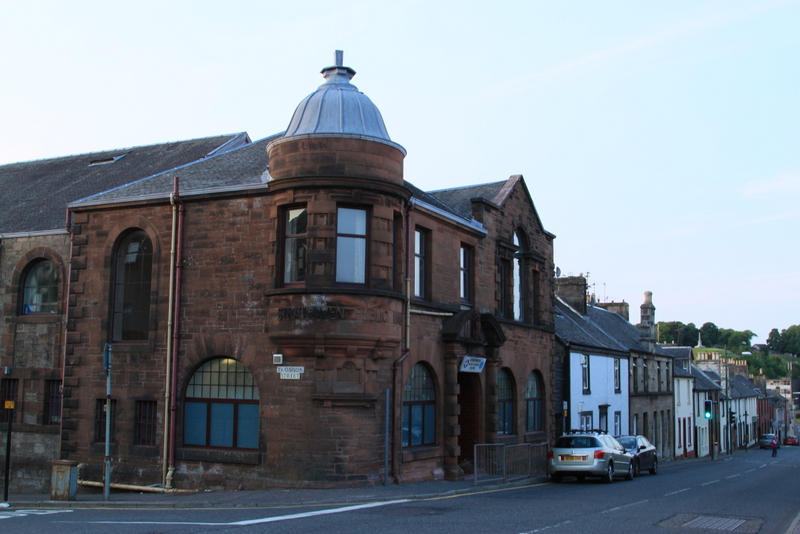
Strathaven Public Hall

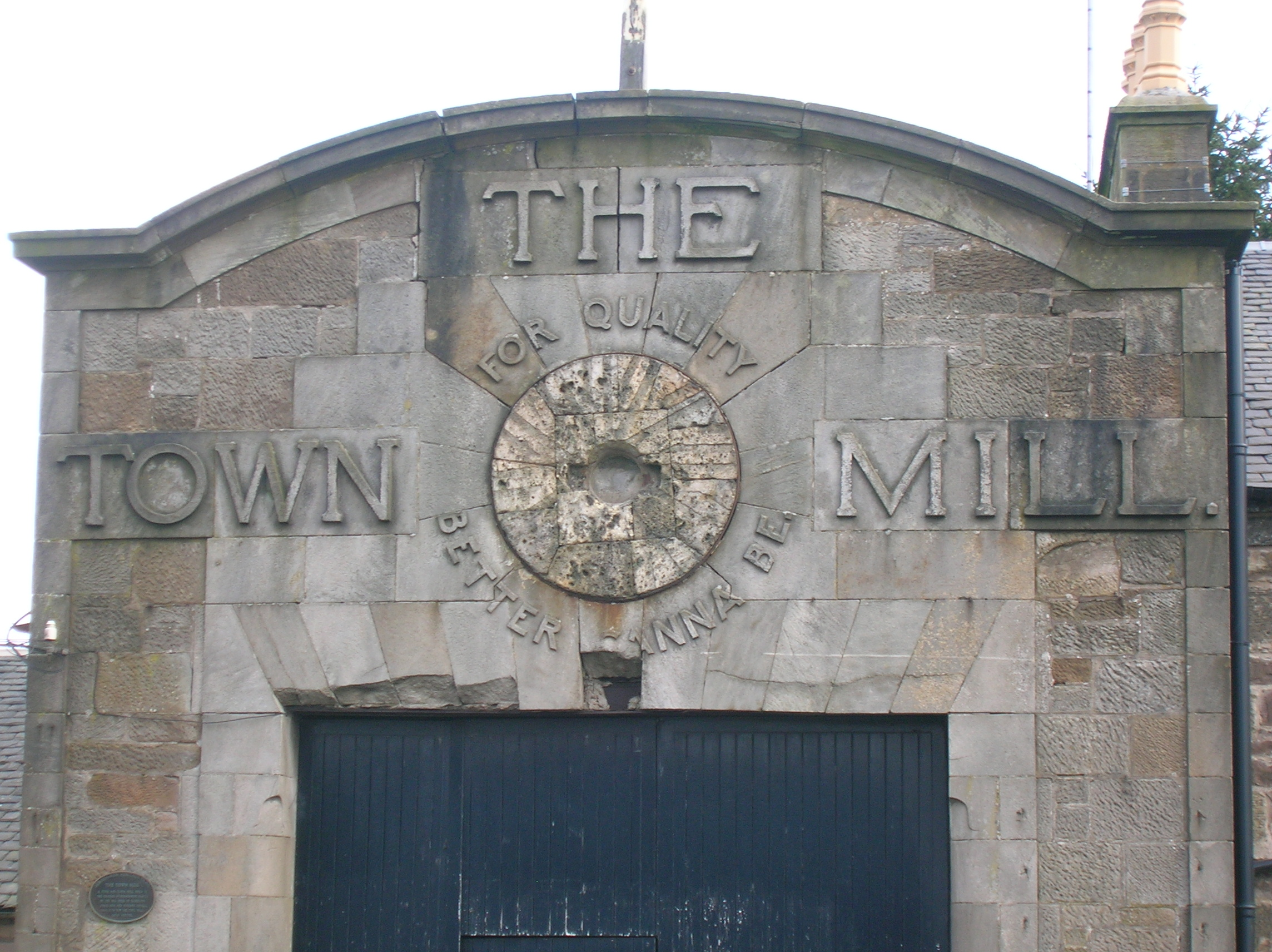
Detail of the advertisement on the town mill

A Roman road passes close by, on the south side of the Avon Water; it led to the Roman fort at Loudoun Hill near Darvel. The origins of Strathaven Castle are obscure, but it is believed to have been held by the Bairds until after the end of the Wars of Scottish Independence in 1357. It then passed to William Douglas, 1st Earl of Douglas in 1370.

The settlement within the lands of Strathaven became a burgh of barony in 1450. The centre of the town is occupied by the market square, formerly a grassed common, and still known as Common Green, or just 'The Green'. Linking the town and the castle is the old 'Boo Backit Brig' ('bow-backed bridge'), a small arched bridge.

The Old Parish Church, with its landmark spire, was built in 1772, and was the place of worship of the Dukes of Hamilton, who had a section of the church reserved for them.

The town played a significant part in the Radical War of 1820, when James Wilson led a band of radicals on a march to Glasgow, to join a rumoured general uprising, which never actually happened. Wilson was hanged for treason.

Its most famous 'modern' resident was the singer, Sir Harry Lauder (1870–1950) whose mansion, Lauder Ha', or Hall, remains in the town's Lethame neighbourhood, the estate's entrance leading from the road to Kilmarnock. Sir Harry spent the Second World War years there, and died in February 1950.

Dungavel House on the outskirts of Strathaven was the place where German Deputy Führer, Rudolf Hess, originally intended to land on the evening of 10 May 1941 in a misguided attempt to seek peace talks with the Duke of Hamilton. However bad weather and poor navigation resulted in Hess having to land at Floors Farm in Eaglesham.

In 2002, Strathaven was granted the title of Scotland's First Fairtrade Town (jointly with Aberfeldy) under the leadership of Paulo Quadros, chair of the first Fairtrade group in Scotland.

== Governance ==
The town is part of the Avondale and Stonehouse ward of the South Lanarkshire council area. Before 1996, it was part of the Strathclyde region, with a district council in East Kilbride. Previous to that, it had been part of the Fourth landward district of the County of Lanark.

As of the 2024 UK General Election, Strathaven is represented in Westminster by the East Kilbride and Strathaven Labour MP, Joani Reid. In Holyrood, the town is represented by Clydesdale constituency SNP MSP Màiri McAllan.

== Long-established business ==
The town's longest established business is Gebbie & Wilson, Solicitors in the Common Green, which was founded by William Gebbie in 1816. Local bakery Alexander Taylor is the longest-established bakery in Scotland. Opened in 1820, the business is operated by the sixth generation of the Taylor family.

== Landmarks ==
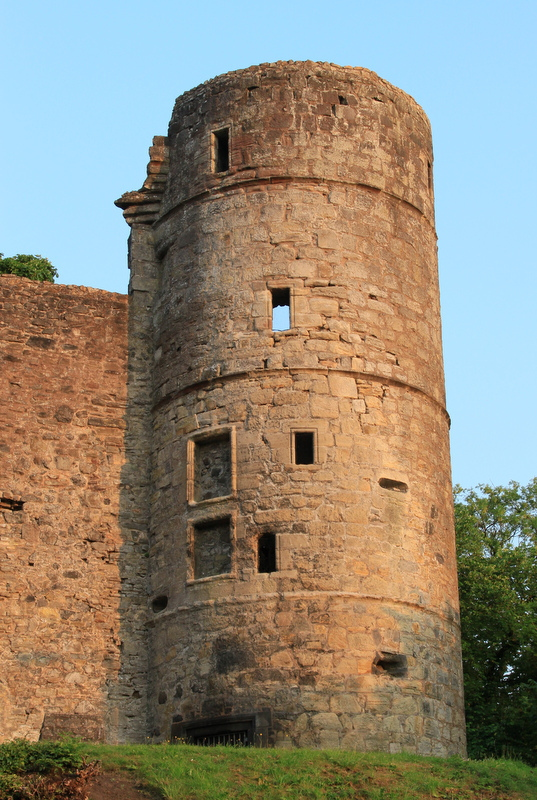
The sole remaining tower of Strathaven Castle

The major landmark in the town is Strathaven Castle. Beside the castle lies the Town Mill. Built in 1650 at the behest of William, the 2nd Duke of Hamilton, the mill remained in operation until production ceased in 1966. The building, after having undergone repairs and refurbishment since its time in use as a mill, now operates as an Arts and Heritage centre. Strathaven Public Hall was designed by Alexander Cullen and completed in 1896.

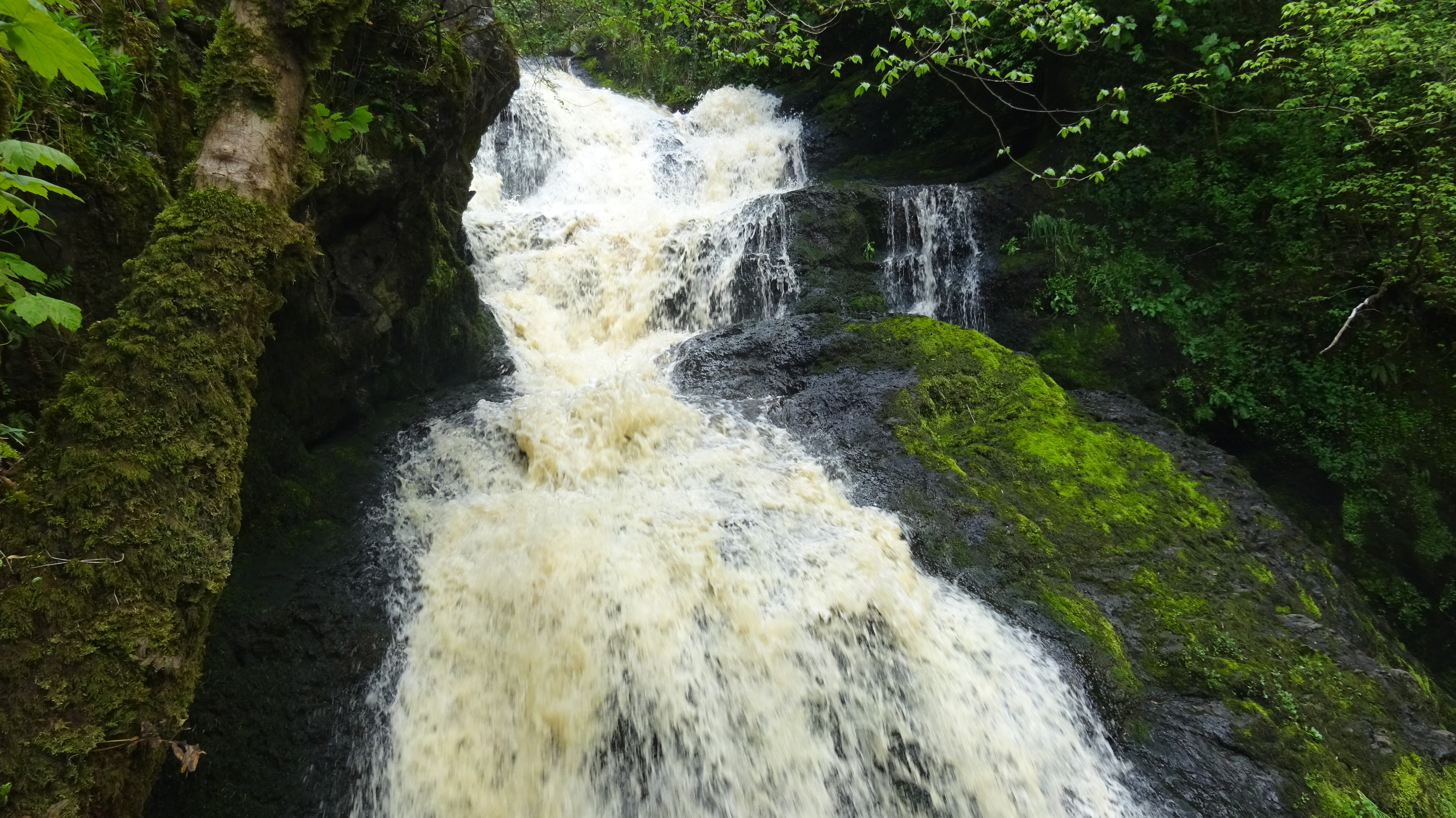
The Spectacle E'e falls on the Kype Water

Between the town and nearby village Sandford lie the Spectacle E'e (Lallans word for 'eye') falls. The falls are named so for a local tale of a tryst between a young man and the miller's daughter. The miller disapproved of the young man, finding him unworthy of his daughter's company, and decidedly put an end to the affair. In retaliation, the young man is said to have placed an eye glass in the thatched roof of the mill, thus, through the refracted sunlight, the mill was set ablaze. Ruins of the mill exist today around the waterfall. The falls are accessible by a trail leading from Lesmahagow Road.

Strathaven has two public parks which are adjoined by a bridge over the Powmillon Burn. The lower of the two is the John Hastie Park, named for a local businessman who left a sum in his will to the town for the provision of funds for the park and the former museum which are named in his honour. The higher of the two is the George Allan Park which features a boating pond, an ornate cast-iron bandstand installed in 1902 and a miniature railway. Dating back to 1949, the railway is the oldest of its kind in Scotland. The park is named for the son of local Reverend James Allan whose son, George, was involved in a fatal sporting accident aged only 13. The Reverend Allan donated the funds necessary for the park's foundation which was then named in his son's honour.

== Transport ==
The A71, which connects Edinburgh and Irvine passes through the town. The A723 links Strathaven to Hamilton and the A726 links it to East Kilbride, and further onto Glasgow. As part of South Lanarkshire, the town is in the Strathclyde Partnership for Transport area.

=== Former railway stations ===
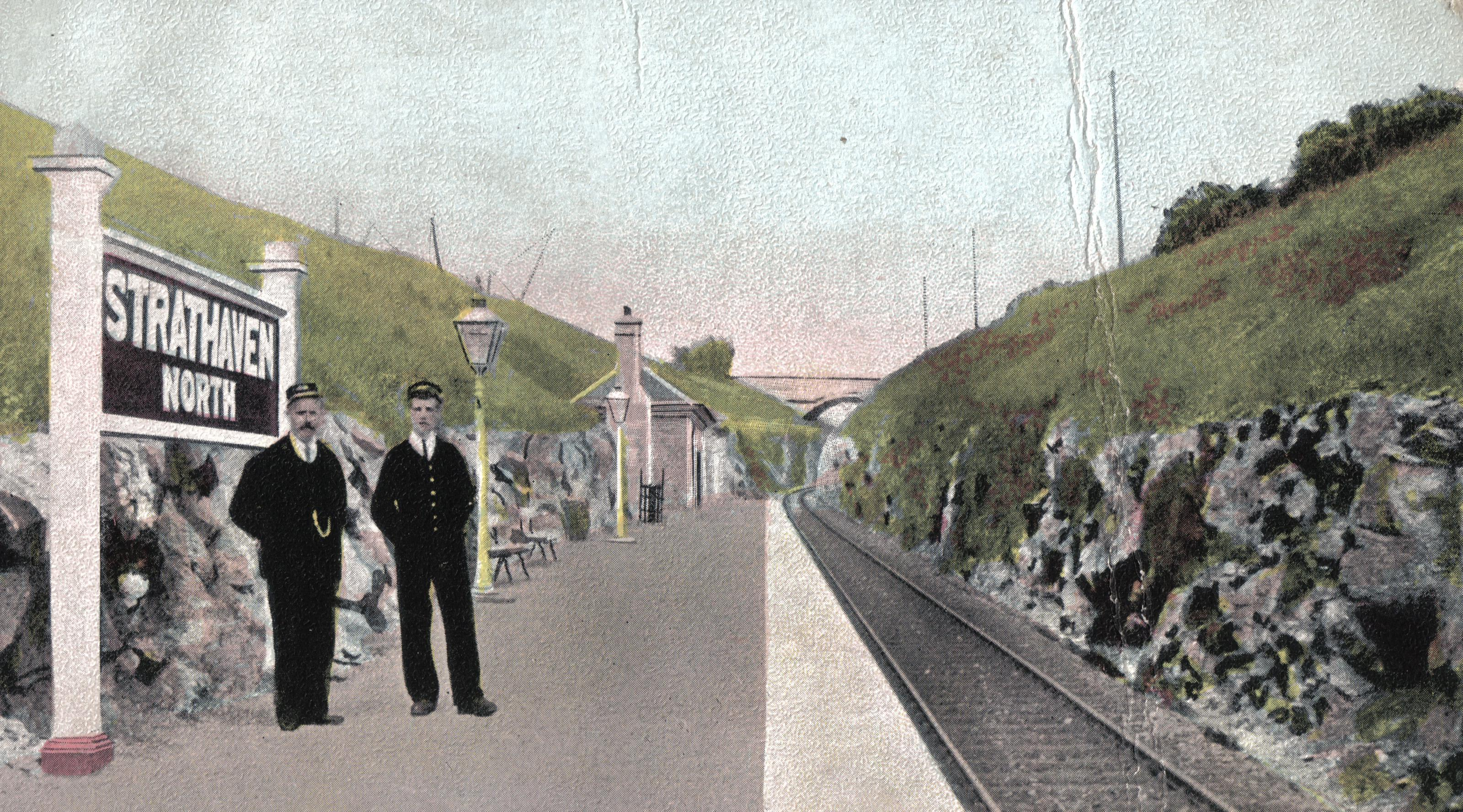
Strathaven North station in 1906

Strathaven had, at various times, three railway stations.

- Strathaven (Old), the first station, was the terminus of the Hamilton and Strathaven Railway. The railway was taken over by the Caledonian Railway; and the station closed in 1964.
- Strathaven North, a terminal station on the Hamilton and Strathaven Branch of the Caledonian Railway, opened in October 1904, closed temporarily during World War I; and closed completely in 1953.
- Strathaven Central, on the Darvel and Strathaven Railway closed in June 1964 to services from the east, although the line to Darvel closed in 1939.

=== Strathaven Airfield ===
Strathaven Airfield is home to a microlight flying school, which operates both the traditional-style weightshift microlights and the light aircraft-style ones, and the new airfield manager's house was featured on Channel 4's Grand Designs in October 2013. There are approximately 35 aircraft – both light aircraft and microlights – hangared at Strathaven in two modern purpose-built hangars. The airfield is also home to an annual local music festival, HangarFest. The airfield was set up on the old Couplaw Farm, which The Scottish Flying Club Ltd bought in May 1964. The club had begun flying in 1927 at the old Renfrew Airport but was left homeless after Renfrew was nationalised in 1946. Strathaven Airfield was given to the RAF Benevolent Fund in 1974 and then sold privately in 2005. It has three grass runways, the main runway is oriented 09/27 (east-west) and is 530 m long (with a 100 m starter extension on 27 available on request). The airfield co-ordinates in the UK Air Pilot ENR 5.5-17 are: 554049N 0040654W.

== Education ==
There are seven primary schools in and around Strathaven: Chapelton Primary School, Gilmourton Primary School, Glassford Primary School, Kirklandpark Primary School, Sandford Primary School, St Patrick's Primary School and Wester Overton Primary School

Strathaven Academy is the town's only secondary school.

== Religion ==
Strathaven contains five churches including two Church of Scotland parishes: Avendale Old (built in 1772) linked with Drumclog Parish Church, and also Strathaven Trinity Church (consisting of three places of worship, in Glassford, Chapelton and the former Strathaven Rankin buildings). Strathaven Trinity began in May 2018, during which time the former East Parish Church (built in 1777) building closed. The Rt Rev Dr Shaw Paterson, minister at Strathaven Trinity, was elected to be Moderator of the General Assembly of the Church of Scotland for 2024–2025.

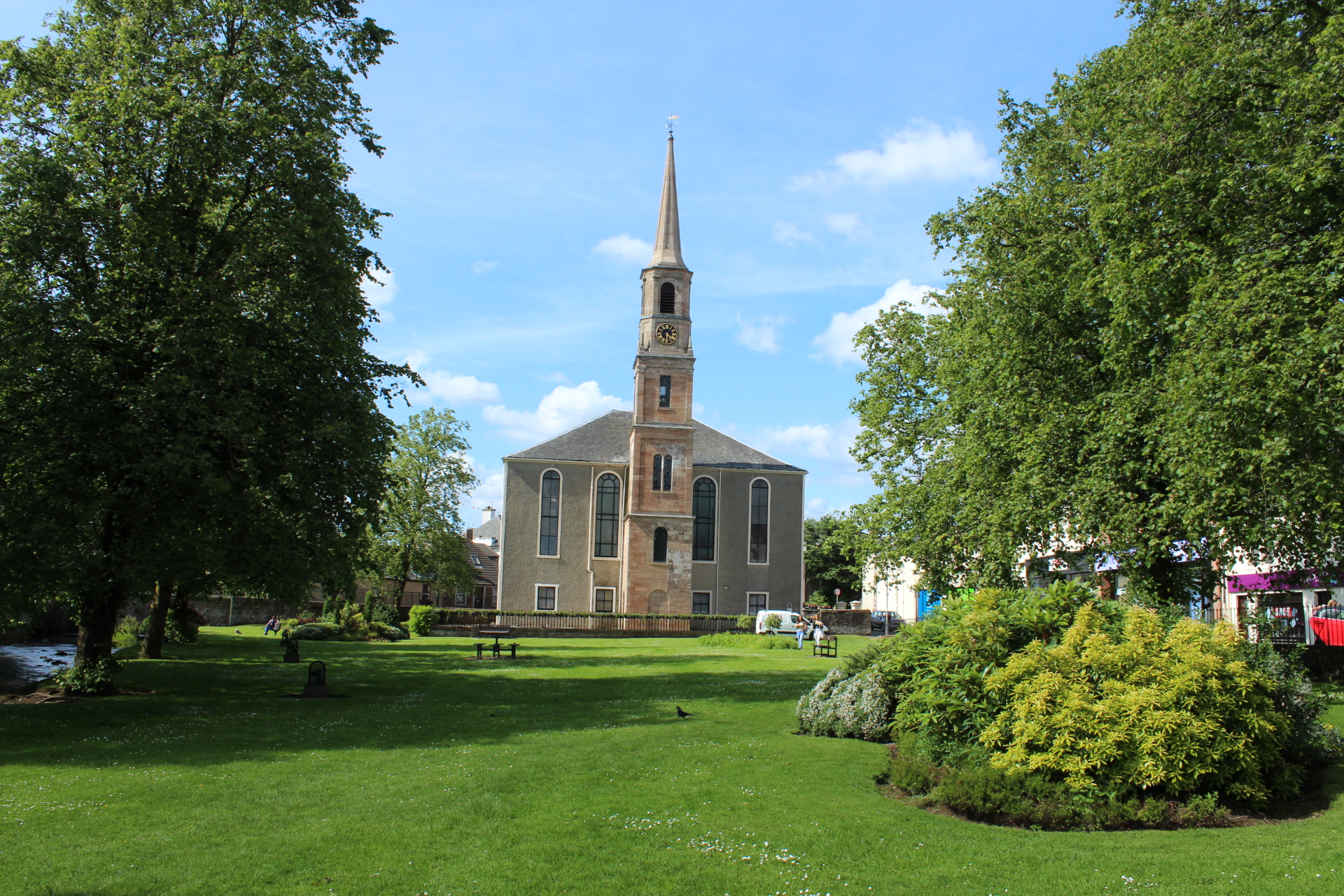
The former East Parish Church

The town's only Roman Catholic church is St Patrick's Catholic Church. The Parish was founded in 1859 to serve the growing Catholic population of Avondale following migration from Highland and Irish communities following the Clearances and the Great Famine. The current church building was constructed in 1901, paid for by then Archbishop Charles Eyre. The older, original church building now serves as the parish hall.

Outreach Community Church, planted in 2000, now worships in the former Strathaven: West Church of Scotland building. It is part of the Synergy Christian Churches network.

Strathaven Evangelical Church was planted in 1991, and meets in the former Gospel Hall.

At the 2022 census, 29.52% identified as Church of Scotland, 9.49% as Roman Catholic and 5.34% as other Christian. 1.32% of the population identified with another religion.

== Sport ==
Strathaven is home to several sports clubs, which include Strathaven Rugby Club which has a 3G, all-weather pitch.

== Culture ==
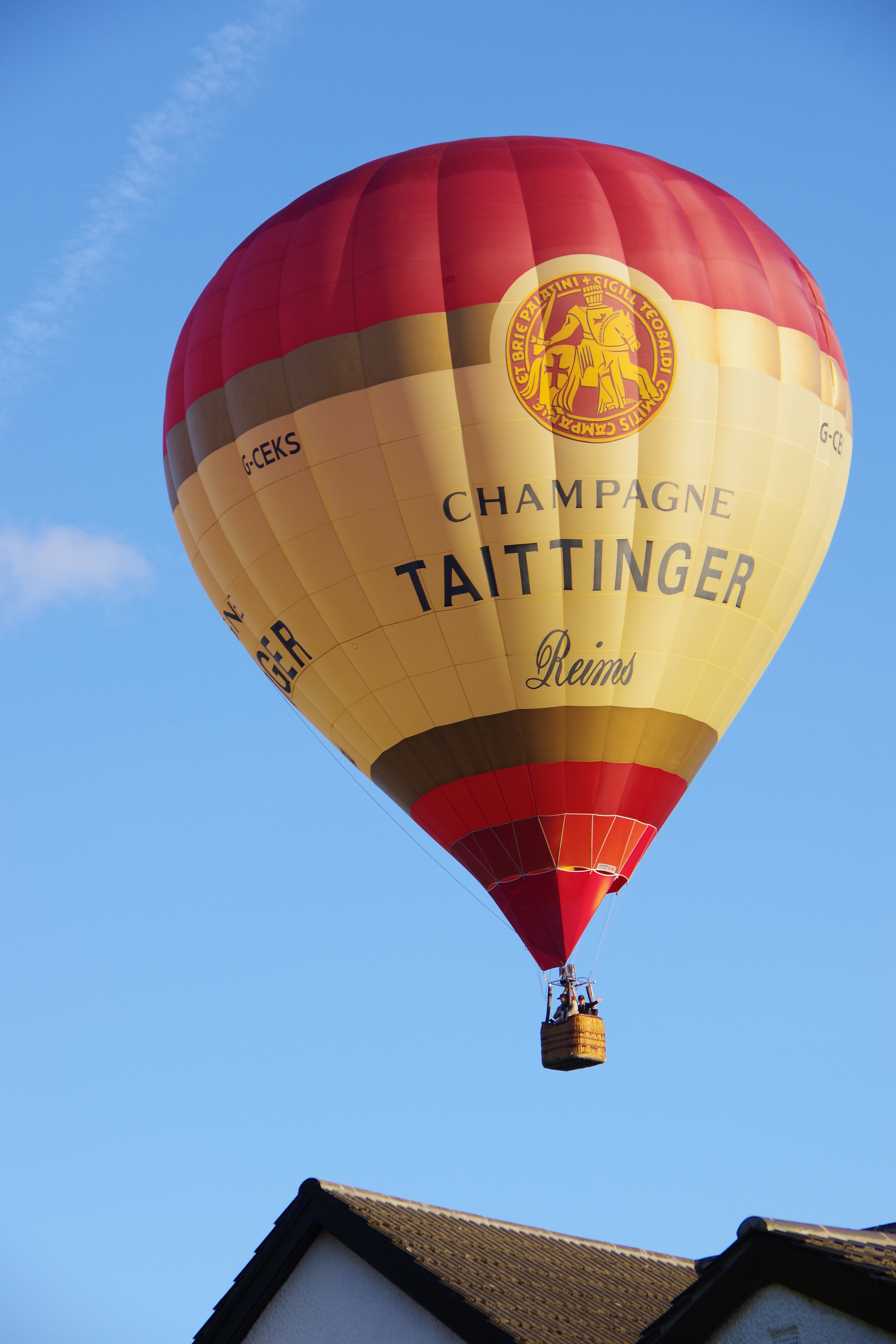
Hot air balloon in flight over the town

Strathaven Hotel houses a small seated venue holding acoustic music gigs under the title FRETS. Artists performing have included Arab Strap, Norman Blake and Euros Childs, Lloyd Cole, Altered Images, Robyn Hitchcock and Michael Head.

The town is host to Scotland's only hot air balloon festival. Held each August since 1999, the event attracts pilots and enthusiasts from across Europe.

In the Third Statistical Account of Scotland, County of Lanark, the Reverend C. Arthur Robertson, writing in 1953, quotes from the diary of a John McGowan, a native Strathavonian himself writing in Minnesota, U.S.A. c.1810 wherein is described some of Strathaven's folkloric history, "A small natural rock situated about a mile south of the town of Strathaven on the north bank of the River Avon in the parish of Avondale. Its curious form and romantic situation - with surrounding rocks rising abruptly and forming an amphitheatre about forty yards distant from it - give it the air of something grand and majestic. This little hill is covered with a slight coat of earth and planted with a few scotch firs, and the surrounding rocks are also covered with trees, forming a square on the north-east side of the Dabbie Dancie.

The hill itself is about 40 ft. high and 40 yds. long of the bed of the Avon, and was supposed to be the haunt of a water kelpy in the dark ages of romance.

'On a stormy afternoon, as a cow-herd was gathering his cattle for home, he heard a voice more than human, just at the site of this old mount (the waters of the Avon were rising rapidly), call out, 'Carry me from Dabbie Dancie into Winkins Waas'. Which Winkin Waas is a rock placed on the other side of the Avon. This mount too, it is said, has the honour of Scots laws and ancient rites and superstitions delivered here by chiefs, and so public justice executed.'"

== Notable people ==
- Bertie Auld, footballer and one of the Lisbon Lions who played with Celtic, lived in Strathaven
- Stuart Braithwaite, singer and musician with the band Mogwai, attended Strathaven Academy
- Eric Caldow, Scottish international footballer who played with Rangers, founder of Strathaven Dynamo
- William Craig, surgeon and botanist, President of the Edinburgh Botanical Society and Fellow of the Royal Society of Edinburgh, born in Strathaven
- Linda Fabiani, Scottish National Party politician and former Scottish Executive Minister for Europe, External Affairs and Culture, lived in Strathaven
- David Fernández, Spanish footballer who spent most of his career in Scotland playing for clubs including Celtic and Kilmarnock, lived in Strathaven
- James Mackinnon Fowler, Australian politician and founding member of the Victorian Socialist League, born in Strathaven
- Gordon Gibb, businessman, CEO of Flamingo Land Ltd and former chairman of Bradford City Football Club, brought up in Strathaven
- Sir Robert Giffen, financial editor of The Times newspaper and President of the Royal Statistical Society, born in Strathaven.
- Andy Kerr, Labour politician and former Scottish Executive Health Minister, lives in Strathaven.
- Sir Harry Lauder, singer, comedian and music hall entertainer
- Thomas Leiper, tobacco merchant
- Marion Jean Lyon, the first women advertising manager of a major British publication, was born in Strathaven
- Stuart McCall, Scottish international footballer who played for Rangers, Everton and Bradford City, lived in Strathaven
- Una McLean, actress and comedian
- John Miller, footballer for Scotland, Queen's Park F.C. and Pollock FC
- Mary Nimmo Moran, American artist and landscape etcher
- Aileen Neilson, Paralympian, lives in Strathaven
- The Rt Rev Dr Shaw Paterson, minister at Strathaven Trinity, was elected to be Moderator of the General Assembly of the Church of Scotland for 2024–2025.
- Corrie Scott, swimmer and bronze medalist at the 2014 Commonwealth Games
- Jack Smart, football player
- Andy Stewart, Conservative MP from 1983 to 1992 for Sherwood, chaired Strathaven Young Unionists in 1957–58.
- Daniel Thomson, footballer
- Sara Vickers, actor, born in Strathaven
- Ricky Warwick, singer and guitarist with rock bands The Almighty and Circus Diablo, currently vocalist with Thin Lizzy
- James Wilson, revolutionary leader who participated in the Scottish Insurrection of 1820
- Barry Leitch, video game music composer
