= Ollie Wride =

British musician and producer (born 1989)

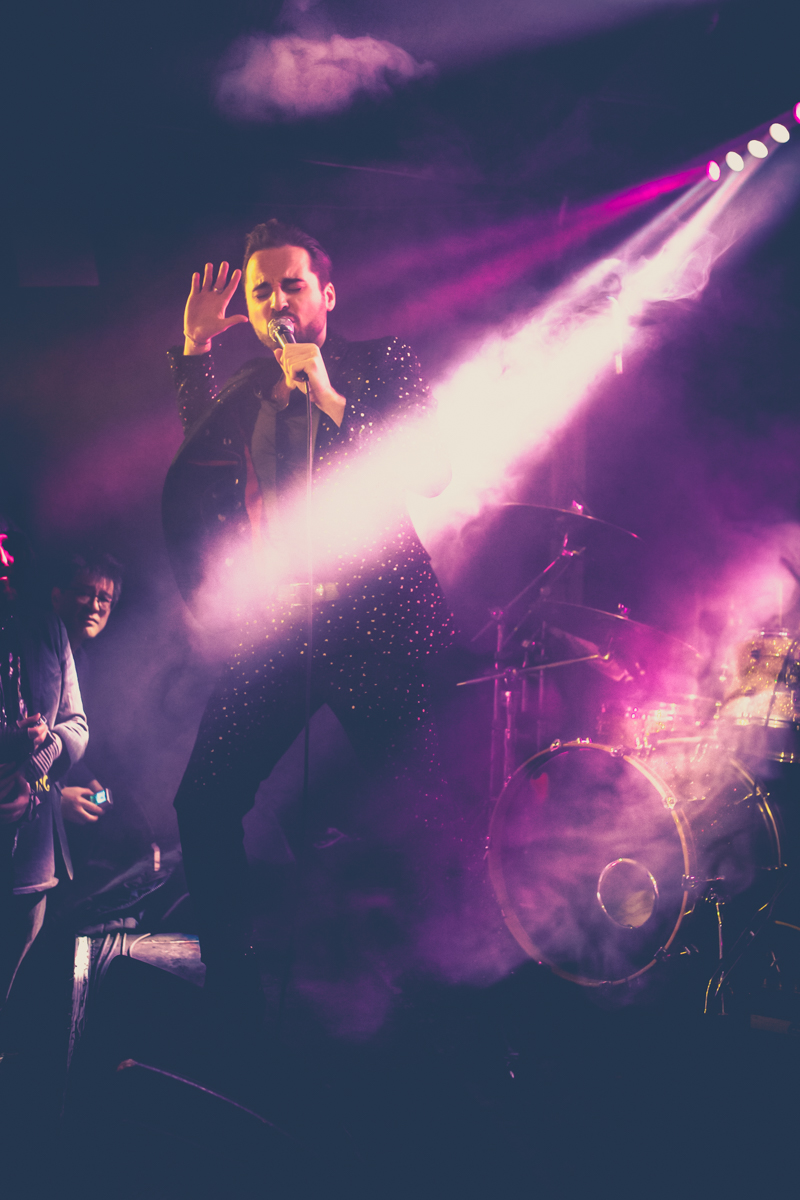
- Wride performing at Camden Assembly in 2019

Background information
- Born: Oliver Jack Wride; 30 November 1989 (age 36); East Riding of Yorkshire, England
- Genres: Electropop; Synth-pop; Synthwave
- Occupations: Musician; music producer; singer; songwriter
- Years active: 2009–present
- Labels: Atlantic Records; NRW Records; M3 Recordings
- Website: olliewride.com

Oliver "Ollie" Jack Wride (born 30 November 1989) is a British singer-songwriter. He is best known for his work with synthwave act FM-84 and subsequent solo releases under his own name.

== Early life ==
Wride grew up in East Riding of Yorkshire, England. He was educated at Pocklington School from 1997 to 2006. In 2007, Wride moved to Brighton to study music at Brighton Institute of Music (BIMM), where he earned a degree in Professional Musicianship in 2009.

Wride has cited that his musical influences were derived from his father's record collection while growing up, including David Bowie, Bryan Ferry & Roxy Music, Peter Gabriel, Queen and Michael McDonald.

== Music career ==
Wride got his first break in music when, during his tenure at BIMM, he auditioned for an all-female band and was subsequently signed by Atlantic Records some months later. Within a year of signing with Atlantic, Wride had written for and with Justin Hawkins, Rob Cavallo and Shayne Ward on the Meat Loaf album Hang Cool Teddy Bear, and also Sophie Ellis-Bextor.

He went on to form and perform in Joywride with Josh Dally, Poppy Kavanagh and James Cross after Atlantic exercised not to extend their option. In July 2010 Joywride supported Tinchy Stryder and The Saturdays at the O2 Arena in London, playing to over 14,000 people. They toured with Rita Ora, Jessie J, Lawson and Olly Murs and headlined Sundown Festival in Norwich in 2013.

In 2015 Wride was introduced by Dally to synthwave act Timecop1983, collaborating on the track “Wild Love” for the album Reflections released that year.

In 2016 he worked with the San Francisco-based producer FM-84, co-writing the songs "Never Stop", "Running In The Night" and "Wild Ones" released that year on the album Atlas.

Wride released his debut album Thanks in Advance in 2019, which charted at 95 on the UK Official Album Downloads Chart. It also charted on Billboards Top 10 Electronic charts as well as No. 1 on iTunes' Electronic charts.

He embarked on his first solo tour across the United States in 2023 with a sold-out performance at West Hollywood’s Troubadour on 15 June 2023.

In the same year, he signed with M3 Recordings, a record label started by Matt Pinfield, Matt Malpass and Matt Holmes.

Wride released his second album The Pressure Point on 7 February 2025 with the final single "Wish You Well" featured on Spotify’s New Music Friday playlist and John Mayer’s SiriusXM Fresh Finds. The single also featured on BBC Music Introducing York & Humberside on 9 January 2025. The album charted at 49 on the UK Official Album Downloads Chart and entered the Top 100 on the UK iTunes Charts.

He supported the album by touring the UK and USA from 2024 to 2025.

In March 2026, Wride undertook a short United States tour titled the 3 Stops & Vegas Tour. The tour included an appearance with Boy George during the Culture Club residency at The Venetian Theatre in Las Vegas, where the pair performed a duet of David Bowie's "Let's Dance". The performance attracted positive attention on social media. Subsequent shows in San Francisco and Los Angeles featured new material. The tour concluded with a live radio performance and interview with Matt Pinfield on The SoCal Sound 88.5FM, where Wride shared his experiences of growing up in Northern England and discovering music through Queen and David Bowie.

== Discography ==
=== Studio albums ===
Title	Details
Thanks in Advance	Released: 19 July 2019; Label: NRW Records; Formats: CD, digital download, Vinyl (LP, 2xLP)
The Pressure Point	Released: 7 February 2025; Label: M3 Recordings; Formats: CD, digital download, Vinyl (LP)

=== Live albums ===
Title	Details
Once in a Lifetime	Released: 19 November 2021; Label: NRW Records; Formats: Vinyl (LP)

=== Singles ===
==== As lead artist ====
Title	Year	Album
"Overcome"	2018	Thanks in Advance
"Never Live Without You"	2018	Thanks in Advance
"The Driver"	2018	Thanks in Advance
"Juliette"	2020	Thanks in Advance (Deluxe)
"Stranger Love"	2020	Thanks in Advance (Deluxe)
"Victoria"	2023	The Pressure Point
"The Way I See It"	2023	The Pressure Point
"A Matter Of Time"	2024	The Pressure Point
"Radio"	2024	The Pressure Point
"Wish You Well"	2025	The Pressure Point

==== As featured artist ====
Title	Year	Album
"Wild Love" (Timecop1983 featuring Ollie Wride)	2015	Reflections
"Running in the Night" (FM-84 featuring Ollie Wride)	2016	Atlas
"Don't Want to Change Your Mind" (FM-84 featuring Ollie Wride)	2016	Atlas
"Never Stop" (FM-84 featuring Ollie Wride)	2016	Atlas
"Bend & Break" (FM-84 featuring Ollie Wride)	2019	Bend & Break
"Malibu Broken" (Jessie Frye featuring Ollie Wride)	2020	Malibu Broken
"Wake Up!" (Michael Oakley featuring Ollie Wride)	2020	Wake Up!
"Soul Survivor" (Fury Weekend featuring Ollie Wride)	2022	Soul Survivor (feat. Ollie Wride)
"Artificial Love" (Carlo Loud featuring Ollie Wride)	2024	Artificial Love
"Mixed Signals" (Arcade Dreams featuring Ollie Wride)	2025	Mixed Signals
"Year Of The Snake" (The American English featuring Ollie Wride)	2025	Year Of The Snake
"Ghost Of You" (The American English featuring Ollie Wride)	2026	Ghost Of You
"Dancing Through Shadows" (Neon Capital featuring Ollie Wride)	2026	Dancing Through Shadows
"Adeline" (Neon Sines featuring Che-Val, Ollie Wride)	2026	Adeline
"Tokyo" (The American English featuring John Waugh, Ollie Wride)	2026	Tokyo

== Concert tours ==
- UK/US Tour (2023)
- The Pressure Point Tour (2024–2025)
- 3 Stops & Vegas Tour (2026)

== Awards and nominations ==
Year	Association	Category	Nominated work	Result	Ref.
2025	Boisdale Xerjoff Music Awards 2025	Male Artist of the Year	Ollie Wride	Won	
