= Overlee Playing Fields =

Public park

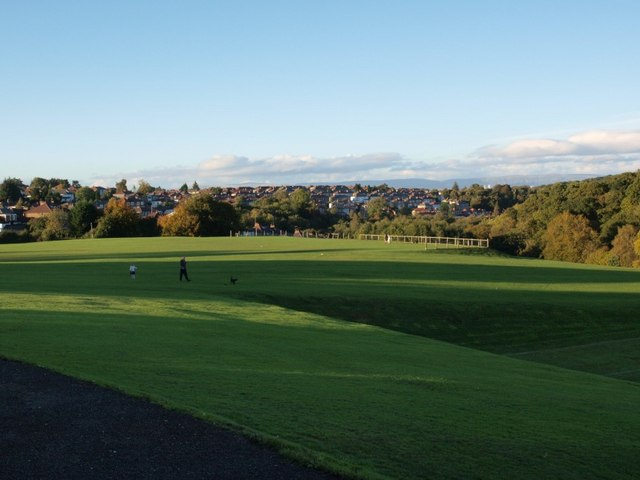
- Interactive map of Overlee Playing Fields
- Type: Public Park
- Location: Stamperland, Clarkston, East Renfrewshire
- Coordinates: 55°47′17″N 4°16′5″W
- Operator: East Renfrewshire Council
- Status: Open all year

Overlee Playing Fields, commonly referred to as Overlee Park, is a public park in Stamperland, Clarkston, East Renfrewshire, south of Glasgow, Scotland.

== History ==
The origins of Overlee Playing Fields are in farming. The area the park contains today is around half of the area of Overlee Farm, which existed during the 19th century. In the early 20th century half of Overlee Farm was built upon for housing, as were the neighbouring Slamanshill Farm (which is what Strawhill Road is named after today) and Stamperland Farm; the Stamperland name persists in the name of the neighbourhood. The other part of Overlee Farm was turned into the park, with the farm buildings still in existence behind the trees on the right at the entrance to the park.

In the early 1800s, the remains of a village of underground dwellings (souterrains or weems) from around 2000 years earlier was uncovered by the local landowner preparing the ground for use as a quarry, but its significance was not recognised and the evidence was destroyed.

Following the death of King George V in 1936 the King George's Fields Foundation was established to give grants for the establishment of playing fields, the work of the foundation is now undertaken by charity Fields in Trust. Overlee Park has been legally protected since July 1938. The entrance to the park is also historically important: there are carvings on the entrance designating the fields as King George's Fields, which have been somewhat damaged since being built but are still visible today.

As recently as 2007, the playground in the park had a major refurbishment. In 2018, there was a large-scale incident at the park, during which teenagers celebrating after receiving their exam results were attacked, and three people were hospitalised.

== Features ==
Overlee Park contains four football pitches, a large playground, a woodland area and Overlee Family Centre (a nursery school, plus a separate provision for community sports – changing rooms etc.), completed in 2021 – it replaced a sports pavilion at the site, which had fallen into disrepair in the 2010s and been occupied by bats, which were re-homed.

Overlee is the home venue of local amateur football team Busby AFC, founded in 1980; its youth section was international player Aiden McGeady's first club in the 1990s.
