= Dana Jean Phoenix =

Canadian musician and actress (born 1987)

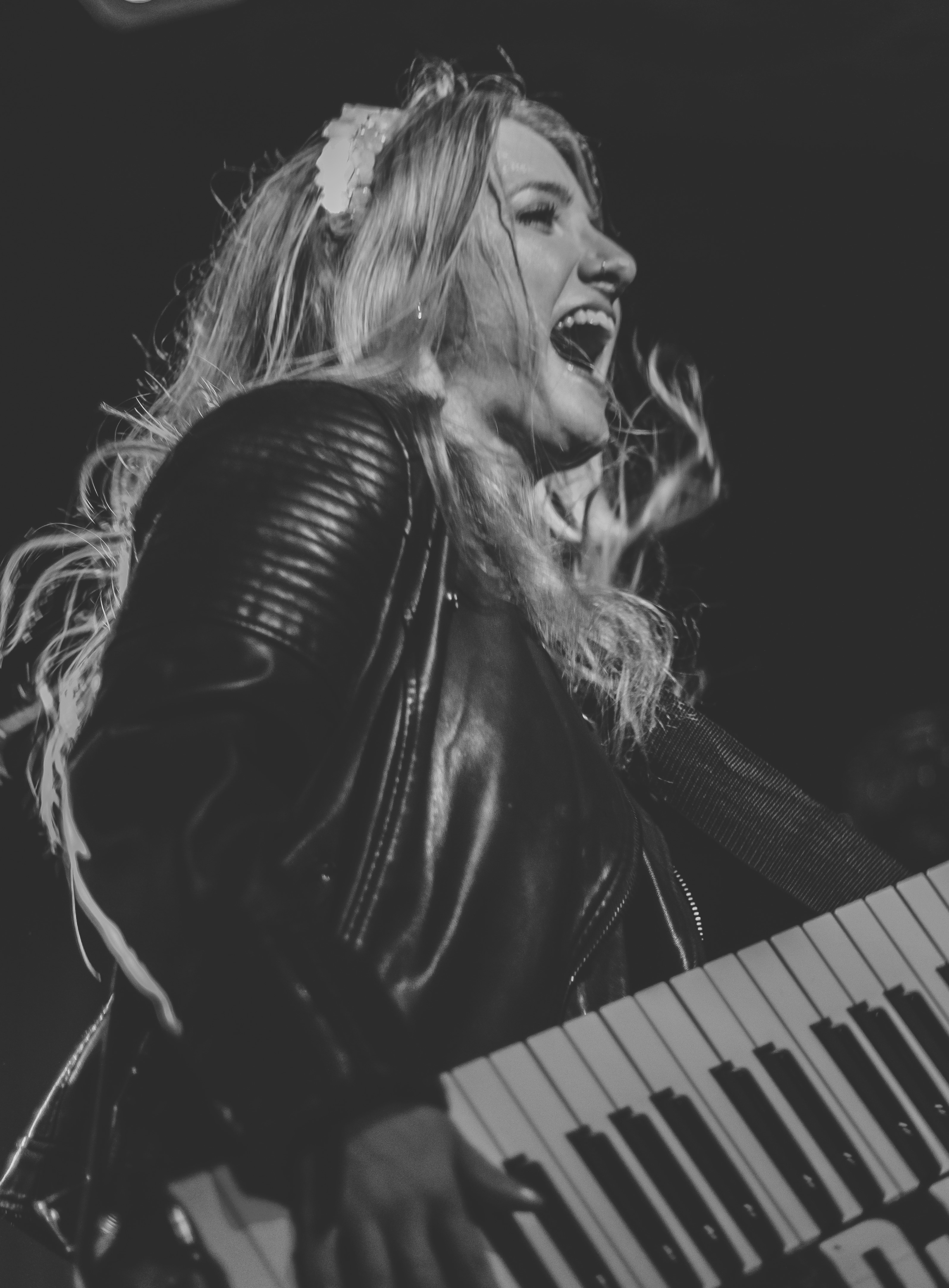
- Phoenix performing in 2019

Background information
- Born: January 30, 1987 (age 39); Toronto, Canada
- Genres: Synthwave
- Occupations: Musician; actress
- Instruments: Vocals; keyboards
- Years active: 2013–present
- Labels: New Empire Entertainment; Outland Recordings
- Member of: God Made Me Funky
- Website: danajeanphoenix.com

Dana Jean Phoenix (born January 30, 1987) is a Canadian synthwave singer-songwriter and musical theatre actress. She is also a vocalist in the Juno-nominated Toronto funk outfit God Made Me Funky.

== Early life and education ==
Phoenix is a graduate of Sheridan College's musical theatre program and she attended The Second City's improv institute.

== Career ==
Phoenix placed second on Perez Hilton's 'Can You Sing' cover competition with her cover of Nicki Minaj's "Starships". Her original music has been featured on CBC Radio's Big City, Small World, as well as on Nickelodeon, MTV, and Bravo.

In 2013, Phoenix performed in The Musical of Musicals (The Musical!) at the Panasonic Theatre in Toronto, to mixed reviews.

In 2014, her album Drrty Shooz made the top 10 on !earshot's National Electronic Chart (College Radio). Her song "Summer Breakup" was featured on the original motion picture soundtrack for The Walking Deceased. That year, she performed in the play "No Chance in Hell" at the Toronto Fringe Festival.

In 2015, she provided vocals on God Made Me Funky's album Funky Fly 'N Free, and she performed in the musical The Wedding Singer at Stage West in Calgary, for which she received a Calgary theatre critics award nomination for 'Best Supporting Actress in a Musical'.

In 2016, Phoenix's sophomore album, Le Mirage, charted on !earshot's National Chart (College Radio). Her collaboration with Dutch synthwave artist Timecop1983, "Dreams", appears in the Netflix original films Coin Heist and You Get Me.

In 2018, Phoenix toured Europe with her album Synth City, playing shows in Vienna, Poland, London, and Stockholm.

In 2020, Phoenix released the album Megawave as a collaboration with Vienna-based band Powernerd.

In 2023, Phoenix co-wrote, with Morgan Joy, the intro theme song for the children's animated TV show Tiny and Tall.

== Discography ==
Studio albums

- Drrty Shooz (2014)
- Le Mirage (2016)
- Synth City (2017)
- PixelDust (2018)
- Megawave (2020)

EPs

- Learning to Fight (2009)
- Phoenix Rising (2011)
- Moving Right with Medsound (2016)
- Run with I-Vision (2016)

Compilations

- Phoenix Rock's the Vox – Vol. 1 (2012)

Singles

- "I Love to Mingle" (2010)
- "New Condition" with Juloboy (2016)
- "Freedom for Your Love" with Juloboy (2016)
- "Synthetic Life" with Julian Emery (2018)
- "Now I'm Alive" with Michael Oakley (2019)
- "Figure Me Out" (2020)
- "Megawave" (2020)
- "Megawave (Outland Extended Remix)" (2020)
- "Freedom Pass (12" Extended Mix)" with Diamond Field (2020)
- "Glasgow Song" with Michael Oakley (2021)
- "Don't Stop Dreaming" with New Arcades (2021)
- "Dreamin'" with Taurus 1984 (2022)
- "Living Without You" with Nevermann (2022)
- "All Alone" with Synthapex (2023)
