= Clarkston, East Renfrewshire =

Town in the Central Lowlands of Scotland

Clarkston: Scottish Gaelic: Baile Chlarc; Scots: Clerkstoun
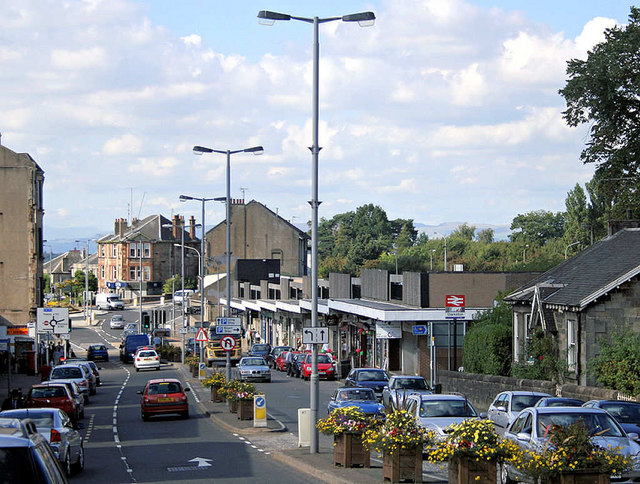
- Busby Road, Clarkston's main shopping street

- Location within East Renfrewshire Clarkston (East Renfrewshire)
- Population: 9,800 (2020)
- OS grid reference: NS574576
  - Edinburgh: 50 mi (80 km) ENE
  - London: 343 mi (552 km) SSE
- Community council: Clarkston
- Council area: East Renfrewshire
- Lieutenancy area: Renfrewshire
- Country: Scotland
- Sovereign state: United Kingdom
- Post town: GLASGOW
- Postcode district: G76
- Dialling code: 0141
- Police: Scotland
- Fire: Scottish
- Ambulance: Scottish
- UK Parliament: East Renfrewshire
- Scottish Parliament: Eastwood

Clarkston (Scots: Clairkstoun, Scottish Gaelic: Baile Chlarc) is a town in East Renfrewshire, in the Central Lowlands of Scotland. A dormitory town with a population of around 10,000, Clarkston is on the southern fringe of the Greater Glasgow conurbation and directly adjoins the neighbouring suburban villages of Busby and Netherlee, as well as the towns of Newton Mearns and Giffnock. The White Cart Water flows to the east of the town.

On 21 October 1971, the main shopping building was the scene of the Clarkston explosion, which killed 22 people and injured around 100. A plaque on the site commemorates the event. The building was rebuilt.

Greenbank Garden, a National Trust for Scotland property, is located on Flenders Road, on the outskirts of Clarkston.

== History ==
When a new road from Paisley to East Kilbride was built through the area in the 1790s, a toll point was set up where it crossed what was then the main route from Glasgow to Kilmarnock and Ayr. A man named John Clark built a house at the toll, and the name 'Clarkston' came to be used for the locality. The Maxwell family (owners of the Williamwood Estate, on which Clarkston was situated) advertised the creation of a new village there in 1801, but initially, it grew slowly. Clarkston at this time had no industry of its own, and villagers were mainly employed in the mills at nearby Netherlee.

In the early 20th century the area began to expand more rapidly, initially in the Sheddens (also called Overlee) area, following the opening of Clarkston railway station by Busby Railways in the village in 1866 which caused the destruction of the older Clarkston village buildings, and later the expansion of the Glasgow tram network to Clarkston in 1921. The 1920s also saw the final breaking up of the Williamwood Estate, encouraging further house building. Clarkston expanded rapidly in the 20th century as new suburban housing developments sprang up. The hilly Stamperland area was built in the 1920s, followed by Carolside and Williamwood in the 1930s and 1940s. The Stamperland terraces as well as parts of Carolside and most of Williamwood were built by John Lawrence & Co. Minor infill sites, mainly replacing derelict farmhouses in Carolside and filling in small cliffside gaps in Stamperland were built in the 1970s, but nothing to the same scale as earlier in the century. The largest development since the 1940s was the development of High Carolside on lands originally owned by the Greenbank Estate, in the 1970s by Mactaggart and Mickel. Funds from this development went to restoring the National Trust's Greenbank House, where the Greenbank Estate centred upon. The Fairfield estate on Eaglesham Road was the final development in the 20th century, being built in the 1990s.

In the 21st century, flats at Aidan's Brae off Mearns Road and houses at Newford Grove were built. Flats have also been built on the old Netherlee and Clarkston Synagogue in Stamperland, as well as on some neighbouring tennis courts. Townhouses were also built at Seres Drive on the old site of Williamwood High School. The replacement school is situated on the southern edge of the town towards Waterfoot, some distance from the old site in the South Williamwood residential area. The Williamwood House, named after the historic estate, is located at the northern edge of the Williamwood Golf Club, in North Williamwood, in Netherlee. The modern Williamwood House was built in the 1930s to replace the then-derelict Williamwood House that was home to the Maxwells. The building is Category B listed, and is being used as a care home.

Clarkston contains two golf clubs, and both have a long history. In 1895 the Cathcart Castle Golf Club opened as Merrylea Golf Club, in modern Merrylee. In 1898, the club was forced to leave, and moved to near Cathcart Castle, in the modern day Linn Park, where it remained for around 20 years. However, after WWI a new golf course was built on Cleuch Farm in Clarkston in 1924, and this time the club kept its name, Cathcart Castle Golf Club. The Cleuch Farmhouse still exists as the Clubhouse for the golf club to this day. The equally large Williamwood Golf Club next to Stamperland was founded in 1906. The land the golf course was built on was previously part of Drumby Farm. The Drumby name survives today as Drumby Drive and Drumby Crescent, with the petrol station being the site of the original farm.

== Governance ==
Clarkston is in East Renfrewshire, one of the 32 council areas of Scotland for local government purposes. East Renfrewshire Council, the unitary local council, is based in neighbouring Giffnock and is the body responsible for local governance. For local electoral purposes, Clarkston was formerly a ward electing a single councillor to East Renfrewshire Council, but is now grouped with Busby and Netherlee as a larger multi-member ward electing three councillors. Clarkston is one of East Renfrewshire's designated community council areas, but following the dissolution of the previous community council in 2015 there were insufficient nominations for it to be re-established at that time.

The Scottish Parliament is responsible for devolved matters such as education, health and justice, while reserved matters are dealt with by the Parliament of the United Kingdom. Clarkston forms part of the county constituency of East Renfrewshire, electing one member of parliament (MP) to the House of Commons of the Parliament of the United Kingdom. Blair McDougall of the Labour Party (UK) was elected as MP for East Renfrewshire in the 2024 general election. Before the constituency's creation in 2005, Clarkston lay in the Eastwood Constituency. For the purposes of the Scottish Parliament, Clarkston forms part of the Eastwood constituency, which is represented by Member of the Scottish Parliament Kirsten Oswald, of the SNP party.

== Geography ==
Paisley

Climate chart (precipitation, max. and min. temperature)
J	F	M	A	M	J	J	A	S	O	N	D
148 7 2	105 7 2	112 10 3	64 13 5	68 16 7	66 18 10	73 20 12	93 19 12	113 16 10	143 13 7	126 9 4	135 7 2
- █ Average max. and min. temperatures in °C
- █ Precipitation totals in mm
- Source: Met Office
Imperial conversion
J	F	M	A	M	J	J	A	S	O	N	D
5.8 44 35	4.1 45 35	4.4 49 37	2.5 55 41	2.7 61 45	2.6 65 50	2.9 67 54	3.6 67 53	4.4 62 49	5.6 55 44	5 49 39	5.3 44 35
- █ Average max. and min. temperatures in °F
- █ Precipitation totals in inches

At 55°47′9″N 4°16′32″W (55.785°, −4.276°) Clarkston is situated in Scotland's Central Lowlands. The community lies 4.7 miles (7.6 km) east of Barrhead, 3.9 miles (6.3 km) northwest of East Kilbride and 5.57 miles (9.0 km) south of Glasgow. The territory of Clarkston is contiguous with Glasgow and forms part of Greater Glasgow, the United Kingdom's fifth-largest conurbation.

Clarkston experiences a temperate maritime climate, like much of the British Isles, with relatively cool summers and mild winters. Regular but generally light precipitation occurs throughout the year.

Clarkston is a postal district within the post town of Glasgow in the G postcode area. Clarkston consists almost entirely of postcode district G76, which also extends beyond the town boundary to include neighbouring settlements Busby, Carmunnock, Eaglesham, Waterfoot, Millhall, and small parts of East Kilbride.

== Demography ==
Clarkston compared according to UK Census 2001
	Clarkston	East Renfrewshire	Scotland
Total population	14,944	89,311	5,062,011
Foreign born	2.9%	3.8%	3.8%
Over 75 years old	7.12%	6.9%	7.1%
Unemployed	1.9%	2.5%	3.9%

According to the United Kingdom Census 2001, the census locality (town and sub-area) of Clarkston had a total resident population of 19,944, or 21% of the total of East Renfrewshire. The median age of males and females living in Clarkston was 38 and 41 respectively, compared to 37 and 39 years for those in the whole of Scotland. Fifty-nine per cent were married, 3.7% were cohabiting couples, 7.0% were lone-parent families and 23.2% of households were made up of individuals.

The place of birth of the town's residents was 97.1% United Kingdom (including 91.8% from Scotland), 0.5% Republic of Ireland, 0.5% from other European Union countries and 1.9% from elsewhere in the world. Compared with the average demographics of Scotland, Clarkston has higher proportions of people born in Scotland and young children (0–15 years old).

Of residents 16–74, 44.0% were in full-time employment, 13.1% in part-time employment, 7.2% self-employed and 1.9% unemployed compared with Scotland as a whole which has 40.3%, 11.1%, 6.6% and 4% respectively. Additionally, in Clarkston 4.5% of students have jobs while 4.2% do not, 15.4% are retired, 4.8% look after their home or family, 3.0% are permanently sick or disabled, and 1.9% are economically inactive for other reasons.

== Points of interest ==
Greenbank Garden is a National Trust for Scotland property situated on Flenders Road, consisting of the 18th-century Greenbank House and its walled gardens. The house is a Category A listed building.

Sporting clubs include Clarkston Bowling and Tennis Club. Overlee Playing Fields (locally known as Overlee Park) was started as a King George V Playing Field and is situated off Moray Drive in the Stamperland area of Clarkston. The park is home to four separate sports pitches, a mini basketball court, and a large playground. A nursery was constructed in the southwest of the park, being completed in 2021. The Overlee Pavilion that was neighbouring the site was demolished.

The town includes other parks, including Library Hill Park and Tinkers Park. There are also two golf courses - Williamwood Golf Club and Cathcart Castle Golf Club.

== Transport ==
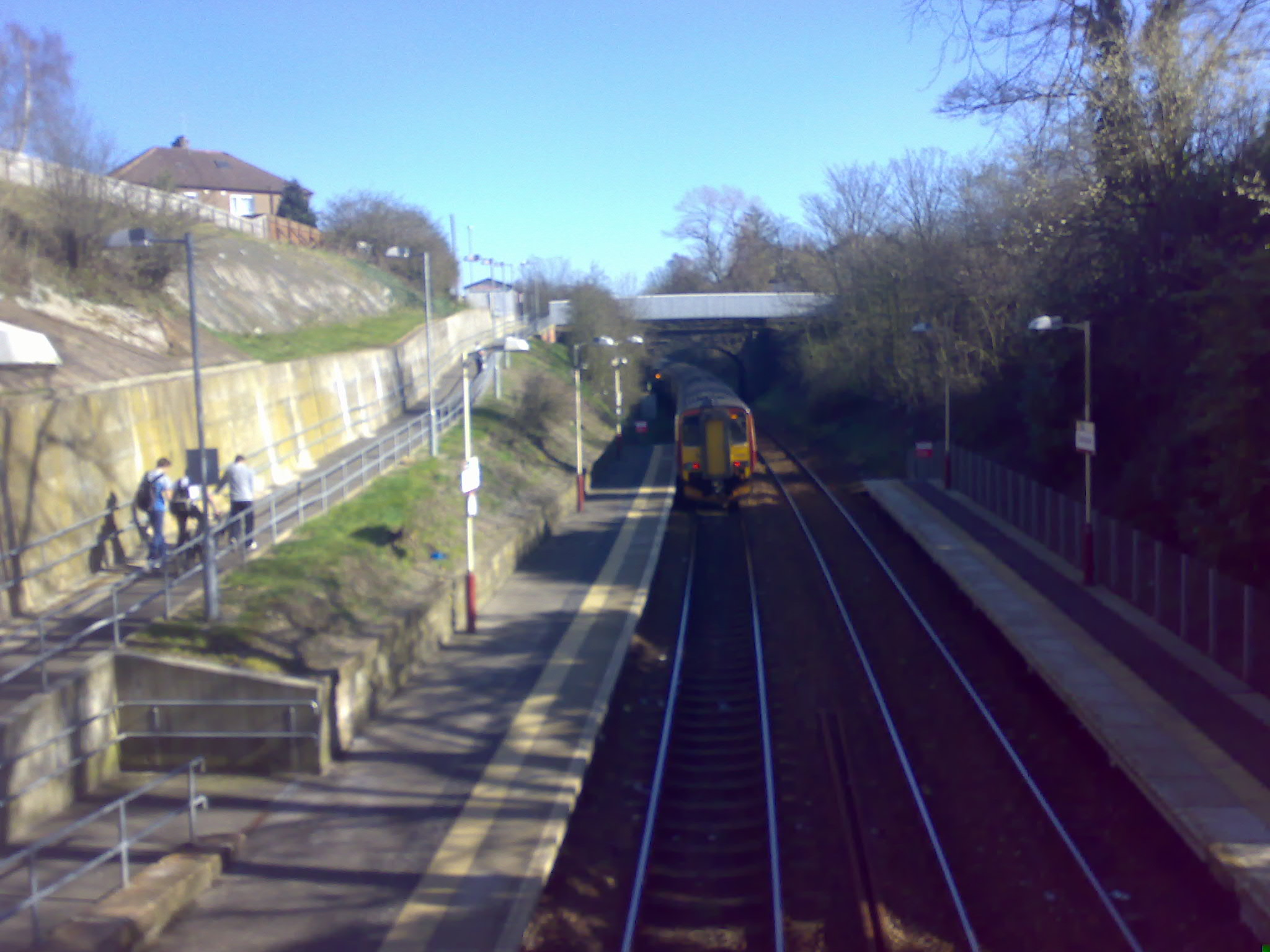
Clarkston railway station

The area has a number of road links to neighbouring Glasgow. The A77 main Glasgow to Kilmarnock road passes through Eastwood Toll in the neighbouring town of Giffnock, where it is connected to the A727, which travels from Darnley to East Kilbride, passing through the town centre of Clarkston. This road used to be known as the A726, but was changed to its modern number in the 2000s after a new road was built south of neighbouring Waterfoot and Newton Mearns. This road was built, partly because the A726 was notoriously narrow and busy in this area, and partly to alleviate traffic in nearby Eaglesham. The B767 also travels through Clarkston, from Eaglesham and Waterfoot to Sheddens Roundabout. The road number disappears for a short distance, before reappearing further north, at Clarkston Toll. The road then continues into Netherlee, before ending in Cathcart in the nearby city of Glasgow. The nearest motorway is the M77, of which Junction 3 at Darnley and Junction 4 at Greenlaw, Newton Mearns, which are the main motorway junctions for Clarkston.

Clarkston lies within the Strathclyde Partnership for Transport Passenger transport executive and is served by two railway stations, both of which are managed by ScotRail:

- Clarkston railway station, opened on 1 January 1866 lies on the East Kilbride branch of the Glasgow South Western Line, which runs from Glasgow Central 5 miles (8.0 km) north.
- Williamwood railway station, opened on 9 July 1929, lies on the Neilston branch of the Cathcart Circle 4.7 miles (7.6 km) south-southwest of Glasgow Central.

The closest airport is Glasgow Airport, 8.1 miles (13.0 km) northwest of Clarkston, near Paisley.

Clarkston is serviced by a number of bus routes by various operators. The main bus links are the number 4 and 4A, linking nearby Eaglesham or Newton Mearns with Glasgow city centre and Knightswood, and the number 6, which connects East Kilbride with Clydebank. Both services are operated by First Glasgow. There is also an additional local bus operated by Todd's Travel to the Silverburn Shopping Centre and Shawlands.

== Notable people ==
Novelist Alistair MacLean lived in the area before moving to Switzerland. Noted residents of the area have included Sir William Kerr Fraser, Principal and Chancellor of Glasgow University; Harry Benson, international photographer, and Judy Murray, tennis educator and promoter; notable Pastor Alistair Begg.

Musicians associated with Clarkston include Synthwave producer Michael Oakley who grew up locally and attended Williamwood High School, former Thin Lizzy and Motörhead guitarist Brian "Robbo" Robertson who was born and grew up locally, and Stuart Murdoch of Belle and Sebastian, who also grew up in the area.

== Churches ==
Clarkston has five churches. They are Greenbank Parish Church, St Joseph's RC Church, Williamwood Parish Church, St Aidan's Episcopal Church, and Clarkston Baptist Church.

Greenbank Parish Church originally opened in 1884 on Eaglesham Road, at the far south of the modern town centre, having been built at the cost of £4055. It was named after the nearby Greenbank Estate, centred on Greenbank House, which is now a national trust site. The neighbouring manse was built in 1895. 21 servicemen at Greenbank died during World War I, and the iconic clock in the church tower was installed in memory of those killed in the war. In the 1950s Greenbank helped fund churches in the newly built Castlemilk housing estates, in Glasgow. The northern halls, which today make up the majority of the footprint of the church were finished in 1967. The church was refurbished and repainted in the late 1970s. A link corridor to connect the two buildings was finished in 1991. The oldest part of the church is a Category B listed building.

St Joseph's Church was originally built in 1880 on Busby Road. The church was redeveloped in 1971. The nearby St Joseph's Primary School was named after the church.

Stamperland Church was founded in 1939 with help from nearby Greenbank, Williamwood and Netherlee churches. It was on the corner of Clarkston Road and Stamperland Gardens, in the de facto centre of the Stamperland area. In July 2018 Netherlee and Stamperland churches linked, sharing a church minister. The two churches officially united on 1 January 2020. It was stated at the time that both churches would remain open, however in 2022 the congregation voted to close Stamperland Church due to financial deficits. The final service was held on the 26th of June 2022, and soon after the building was sold.

Williamwood Parish Church was founded in 1937. It was built in the centre of the Williamwood area, in a narrow triangular-shaped plot between Seres Road and Vardar Avenue. It was built out of red brick with a short bell tower. It cost £5910 (£67500 adjusted for inflation). In 1995/96 there was modernisation work carried out, creating disabled access, additional toilets and the Iona Chapel.

St Aidan's Episcopal Church was originally started in 1923. It held congregations at the Clarkston Bowling Club until a church building was opened in 1925. The building is near the start of the Mearns Road, in the town centre.

Clarkston Baptist Church is located on Arthur Street at Sheddens. It was built in the 1970s.

== Public services ==
Waste and Water supplies are provided by Scottish Water, a public authority of the Scottish Government. Clarkston's distribution network operator for electricity is Scottish Power. The NHS board is NHS Greater Glasgow and Clyde. The Scottish Fire and Rescue Service is the statutory fire and rescue service and has a fire station based in Clarkston.

Policing in Clarkston is provided by Police Scotland. The Strathclyde Partnership for Transport, a public body in Scotland, has direct operational responsibilities, such as supporting (and in some cases running) local bus services and managing integrated ticketing in Clarkston and other areas from the former Strathclyde region. Transport Scotland manages the local rail network.

== Sources ==
- Nisbet, Douglas (2007). Old Clarkston and Netherlee. Catrine: Stenlake.
- Butt, R. V. J. (October 1995). The Directory of Railway Stations: details every public and private passenger station, halt, platform and stopping place, past and present (1st ed.). Sparkford: Patrick Stephens Ltd. ISBN 978-1-85260-508-7. OCLC 60251199. OL 11956311M.
