= Greenbank Garden =

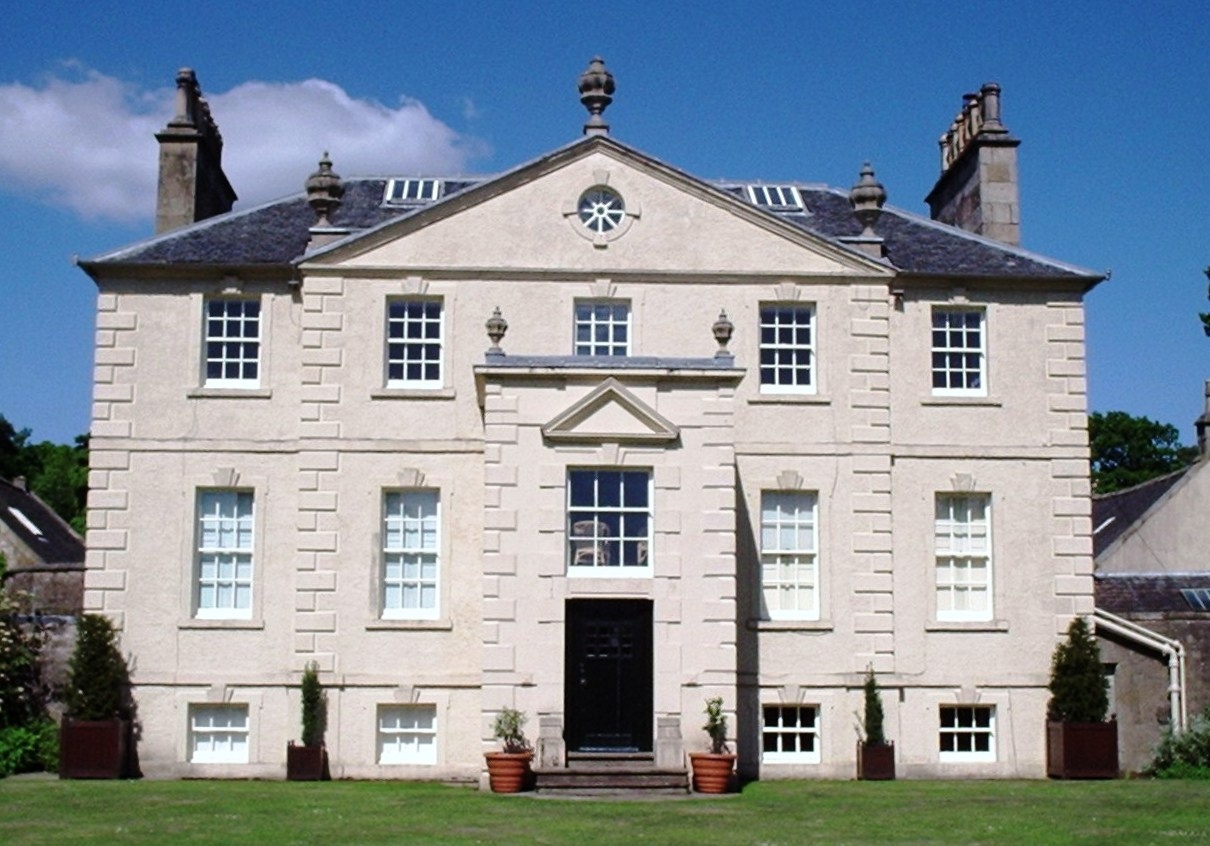
- Greenbank House

- Location within East Renfrewshire
- 55.781°N 4.296°W
- Type: Walled garden and house
- Location: Clarkston, East Renfrewshire, Scotland
- OS grid reference: NS561565

History
- Built: 1763

Site notes
- Owner: National Trust for Scotland

Inventory of Gardens and Designed Landscapes in Scotland
- Official name: Greenbank Garden
- Designated: 1 July 1987
- Reference no.: GDL00203

Listed Building – Category A
- Official name: Greenbank House, High Flenders Road, by Whitecraigs
- Designated: 10 June 1971
- Reference no.: LB18537

Greenbank Garden is a 2.5-acre (10,000 m^{2}) 18th century walled garden in Carolside, Clarkston, East Renfrewshire, Scotland, owned and operated by the National Trust for Scotland and open to the public. It is situated about six miles (10 km) from the centre of Glasgow. The garden, which is included on the Inventory of Gardens and Designed Landscapes in Scotland, surrounds Greenbank House, a Category A listed building. The house has sixteen rooms, and also barns and stables.

== History ==
The Georgian house was built in 1763 for Robert Allason, a Glasgow merchant. Allason was a local man who had begun life as a baker, before setting up with his brothers in Port Glasgow as a trader. He made his fortune trading with Britain's American colonies, eventually becoming a land-holder in the Caribbean. The profits from trade in both tobacco and slaves, allowed him to purchase Flenders Farm (land his family had worked for centuries) and establish the house. However, Allason's trading interests later suffered during the American War of Independence.

Over the next two centuries, the house was owned by a number of families, principally several generations of the Hamilton family, from 1796 to 1961. In 1961, it was bought by William P. Blyth who, with his wife, transformed the grounds from fruit and vegetable growing to the ornamental gardens that are seen today. Then, in 1976, Mr and Mrs Blyth gifted the house, walled garden, and the 16-acre (65,000 m^{2}) estate to the National Trust for Scotland. In 1981, an additional 20 acres were donated by the Young family (descendants of the Hamiltons). Today, the gardens are open all year round, and the house from March until October.

== Description ==
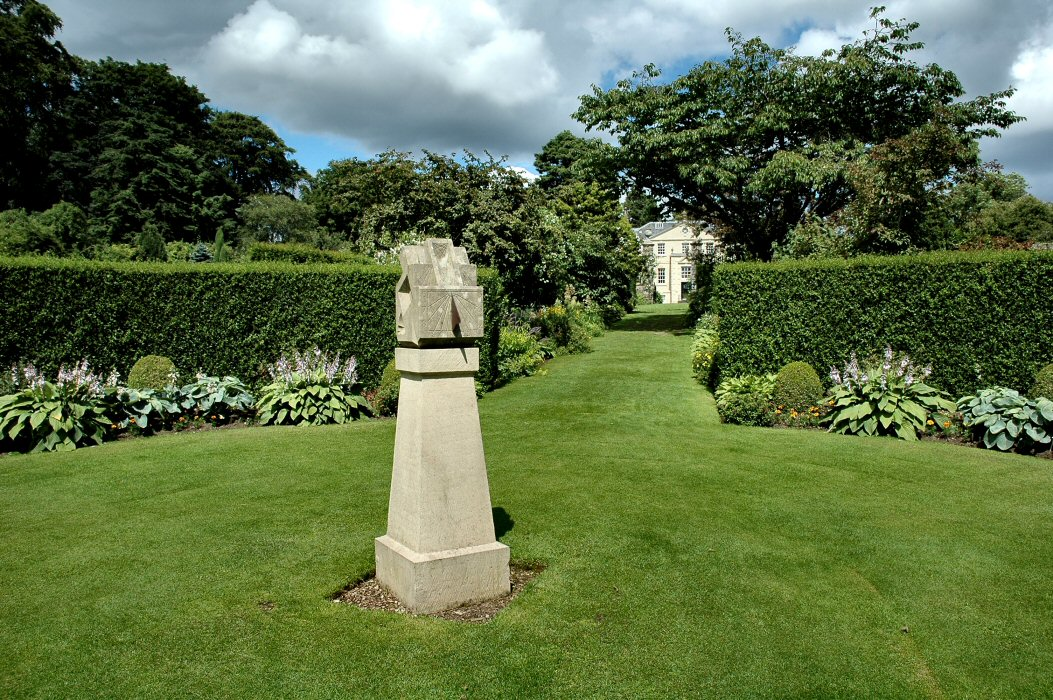
Replica Scottish sundial as a centrepiece

Described as an "educational garden to inspire and educate visitors on what and how to grow a very wide range of more unusual plants which are available in the trade", Greenbank Garden's distinctive feature is its use of hedging and tall plants to divide the gardens into about twelve distinctly characteristic areas. The gardens contain over 3,700 plants depending on the season. These include spring bulbs, apple and cherry blossom, astilbe, aubretia, deutzia, dicentra, saxifrages, hydrangeas, primulas, dahlias, roses, philadelphus, azalea, rhododendron, lythrum, crocosmia, phlox, cosmos, echinops, sedum, lavatera, monarda, helenium and sweet william, as well as rodgersia pinnata superba, echevaria gibbiflora metallica and agrostemma. The National Trust operates a tea-room next to the garden, where there is a substantial encyclopædia of plants, allowing visitors to identify specimens they do not recognise.

As well as the walled garden and the house, there are also 16 acres (65,000 m^{2}) of woodland marked particularly by rhododendrons. The woodland also contains a herd of Highland cattle.
