= Greater Glasgow =

Urban area including Glasgow in Scotland

Coordinates: 55.86200°N 4.25448°W

Greater Glasgow: Scottish Gaelic: Mòr-Ghlaschu; Scots: Muckle Glesca
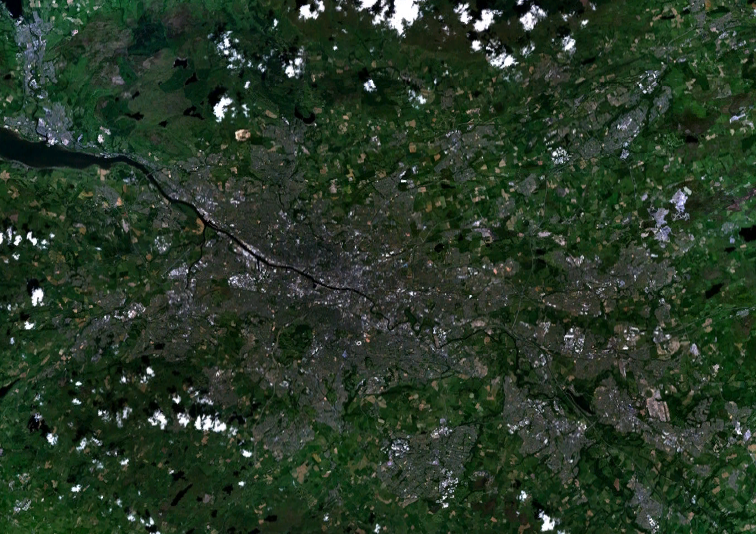
- A satellite image of the Greater Glasgow Area in the 1990s
- Area: 265 km^{2} (102 sq mi)
- Population: 1,028,220 (2020)
- Language: English, Scots, Gaelic
- OS grid reference: NS590655
  - Edinburgh: 42 mi (68 km)
  - London: 403 mi (649 km)
- Country: Scotland
- Sovereign state: United Kingdom
- Post town: GLASGOW
- Postcode district: G1–G84
- Post town: PAISLEY
- Postcode district: PA1–PA19
- Post town: MOTHERWELL
- Postcode district: ML1–ML8
- Dialling code: 0141, 01236, 01355, 01360, 01389, 01505, 01698, 01475

Greater Glasgow is a geographical area in Scotland consisting of all localities which are physically attached to the city of Glasgow, forming with it a single contiguous urban area (or conurbation).

It does not relate to municipal government boundaries, and its territorial extent is defined by the National Records of Scotland, which determines settlements in Scotland for census and statistical purposes. Greater Glasgow had a population of 1,199,629 at the time of the 2001 UK Census making it the largest urban area in Scotland and the fifth-largest in the United Kingdom. The population estimate for the Greater Glasgow 'settlement' (a chain of continuously populated postcodes) in mid-2016 was 985,290—the reduced figure explained by the removal of the Motherwell & Wishaw (124,790), Coatbridge & Airdrie (91,020), and Hamilton (83,730) settlement areas east of the city due to small gaps between the populated postcodes. The 'new towns' of Cumbernauld, which had a 2016 settlement population of 50,920,) and East Kilbride (75,120) were never included in these figures despite their close ties to Glasgow due to having a clear geographical separation from the city. In the 2020 figures, with almost the same boundaries as 2016, the main difference being the re-addition of Barrhead, the Greater Glasgow population had risen to just over 1 million.

A more extensive Greater Glasgow concept covers a much larger area and may include Ayrshire down to Ayr as well as the whole of Lanarkshire down to Lanark, Dunbartonshire, Renfrewshire, and Inverclyde. At present, the Glasgow City Region consists of the Glasgow City Council, North Lanarkshire, South Lanarkshire, West Dunbartonshire, East Dunbartonshire, Renfrewshire, East Renfrewshire, and Inverclyde Local Authorities, with a combined population of over 1.7 million. This city-region is described as a metropolitan area by its own strategic planning authority and is similar to the Glasgow metropolitan area identified by the European Union.

The City of Glasgow grew substantially in population during the late nineteenth and early twentieth centuries, becoming in 1912 the eighth city in Europe to reach the one million mark after Rome, London, Paris, Berlin, Vienna, St. Petersburg, and Moscow. The official population stayed over a million for fifty years. Since the 1960s, successive boundary changes and large-scale relocation to suburban districts and new towns have reduced the population of the City of Glasgow council area to 593,245 at the time of the 2011 UK Census.

== Urban Area ==
Following the local government boundary changes in 1996 and the creation of the present day unitary councils in Scotland, replacing the former regional and district councils, the Greater Glasgow Settlement Area or Urban Area was created for the 2001 Census from groups of neighbouring urban postcodes grouped so that each group of postcode units (known as a locality) contains at least a given number of addresses per unit area, and the group contains at least 500 residents. The localities that make up Greater Glasgow are listed below:

Locality	Council area	Population (1991 census)	Population (2001 census)	Population (2016 estimate)	Population (2020 estimate)
Airdrie (Note: No longer included in Greater Glasgow in 2016 or 2020 figures.)	North Lanarkshire	12,436	36,326	37,410	36,390
Bargeddie	North Lanarkshire	2,325	2,790	2,960	3,210
Barrhead (Note: No longer included in Greater Glasgow in 2016 figures, but re-added in 2020.)	East Renfrewshire	16,703	17,443	17,610	17,890
Bearsden	East Dunbartonshire	27,707	27,967	28,120	28,470
Bellshill	North Lanarkshire	20,075	20,134	20,290	19,700
Bishopbriggs	East Dunbartonshire	23,825	23,118	23,540	23,680
Blantyre	South Lanarkshire			16,900	16,800
Bothwell	South Lanarkshire			6,380	6,870
Bowling	West Dunbartonshire	5,500	5,500	560	560
Brookfield (Note: Added to figure in 2020.)	Renfrewshire			540	880
Busby	East Renfrewshire	1,617	1,654	3,250	3,310
Cambuslang	South Lanarkshire	23,212	24,500	29,100	30,790
Chapelhall	North Lanarkshire	4,405	5,691	6,690	7,140
Chryston	North Lanarkshire			3,000	3,100
Clarkston	East Renfrewshire	18,899	19,136	9,860	9,800
Clydebank	West Dunbartonshire	29,171	29,858	26,320	25,620
Coatbridge	North Lanarkshire	40,320	41,170	43,960	43,950
Duntocher and Hardgate	West Dunbartonshire	7,882	7,301	6,880	6,680
Elderslie	Renfrewshire	5,166	5,180	5,330	5,480
Erskine	Renfrewshire	15,166	15,347	15,510	15,010
Faifley	West Dunbartonshire	6,087	4,932	4,860	4,740
Gartcosh	North Lanarkshire			2,200	2,920
Giffnock	East Renfrewshire	16,190	16,178	12,300	12,250
Glasgow	Glasgow City	658,379	629,501	612,040	632,350
Hamilton	South Lanarkshire	44,658	53,457	54,080	54,480
Inchinnan	Renfrewshire	1,233	1,574	1,860	1,820
Johnstone	Renfrewshire	18,280	16,468	16,090	15,930
Kilbarchan	Renfrewshire	3,710	3,622	3,480	3,300
Linwood	Renfrewshire	10,183	9,058	8,600	8,450
Milngavie	East Dunbartonshire	11,992	12,795	12,940	12,840
Moodiesburn	North Lanarkshire			6,890	6,830
Motherwell	North Lanarkshire	27,426	30,301	32,590	32,840
Muirhead	North Lanarkshire			1,380	1,830
Netherlee	East Renfrewshire			4,600	4,530
Newton Mearns	East Renfrewshire	19,342	22,637	26,600	28,210
Old Kilpatrick	West Dunbartonshire	2,408	3,199	4,680	4,470
Paisley	Renfrewshire	73,925	74,170	77,220	77,270
Renfrew	Renfrewshire	20,764	20,251	22,570	24,270
Rutherglen	South Lanarkshire	25,000	25,000	31,190	30,950
Stamperland	East Renfrewshire			3,640	3,630
Stepps	North Lanarkshire	4,942	4,802	7,450	7,700
Thornliebank	East Renfrewshire	3,980	4,051	4,070	4,170
Uddingston	South Lanarkshire			6,370	6,300
Wishaw	North Lanarkshire	26,439	28,564	30,290	30,050

== Transport ==
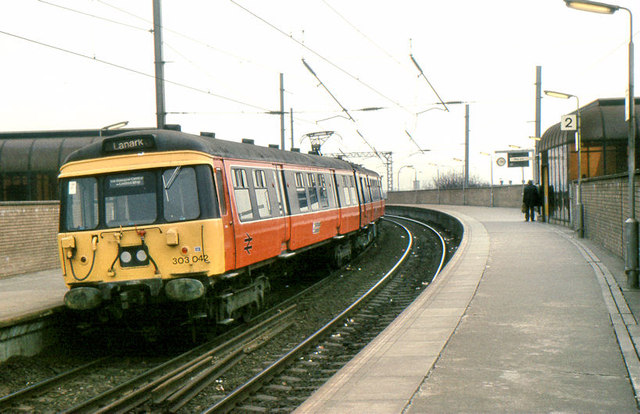
A Strathclyde Transport liveried Class 303 at Partick interchange

In 1973, the Greater Glasgow Passenger Transport Executive, later the Strathclyde Passenger Transport Executive from 1983, and Strathclyde Passenger Transport Authority from 1996, was created to take over control of Glasgow Corporation Transport, which included the Glasgow Subway. Following local government reorganisation in 1975, control passed to Strathclyde Regional Council. The former PTE is now a regional transport partnership known as Strathclyde Partnership for Transport, with most responsibilities being passed to Transport Scotland.

Glasgow is served by the only metro system in Scotland, the Glasgow Subway; and by two international airports, Glasgow Prestwick Airport and Glasgow Airport. Glasgow is also served by the largest suburban rail network in the UK outside of London.

== Glasgow City Region ==
The Glasgow City Region is a collection of local authorities clustered around Glasgow. It is a partnership of eight councils focused on economic growth. It has no independent legal status. The eight constituent authorities are:

- Glasgow
- East Dunbartonshire
- West Dunbartonshire
- North Lanarkshire
- South Lanarkshire
- East Renfrewshire
- Renfrewshire
- Inverclyde

The population of this area in 2011 was 1,787,515. The city region is not a conurbation as significant parts of the council areas (and the whole of Inverclyde) are separated from Greater Glasgow by open countryside. It uses numerous other terms for itself, including Metropolitan Glasgow, the metropolitan City-Region of Glasgow, Glasgow and the Clyde Valley and Clydeside.

As a collection of individual local authorities the city region has no single municipal government. Following the agreement of a City Deal with the UK Government, the eight constituent authorities established a joint Glasgow and Clyde Valley Cabinet in January 2015. This cabinet consists of the leaders of all eight councils, with the leader of Glasgow City Council being Chair of the Cabinet. Prior to 2015 the eight authorities formed only a combined strategic planning authority.

== Metropolitan Glasgow ==
While the Scottish Government makes no official recognition of 'Metropolitan status' in its workings, the term is used by other bodies. The European Union's statistical body Eurostat listed Glasgow as the 32nd most populous metropolitan area, or Larger Urban Zones. Although not defining the boundaries of this metropolitan area, Eurostat stated it consists "of over 1.7 million inhabitants covering an area of 3,346 km^{2}"., which is similar to the 1.75 million population of the Glasgow City Region and may suggest a correlation between the two. The Glasgow City Region's strategic development authority describes itself as the planning authority for the "Glasgow metropolitan area" and the "metropolitan city-region of Glasgow".

The former local government region of Strathclyde has also been identified as a metropolitan area surrounding the Greater Glasgow conurbation, and covers approximately 2.3 million people, 41% of Scotland's population.

== See also ==
- Central Belt
