= Williamwood High School =

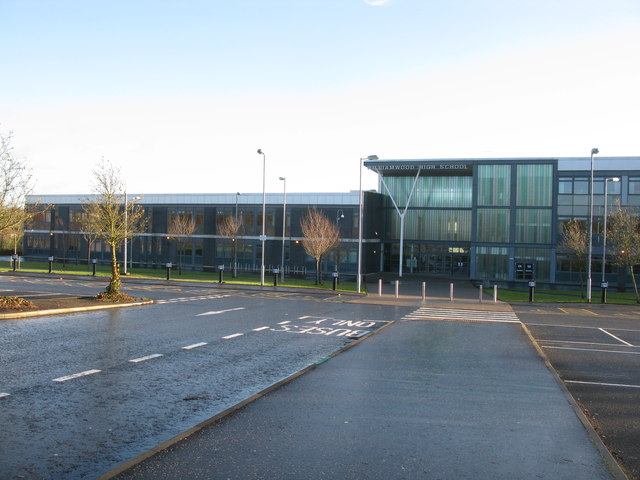

Location
- Eaglesham Road; Clarkston, G76 8RF; Scotland; 55°46′34″N 4°16′33″W

Information
- Former name: Eastwood Senior Secondary School
- Type: Secondary
- Motto: Mighty Oaks From Little Acorns Grow
- Established: 1930
- Local authority: East Renfrewshire
- Head teacher: Nicola MacGlashan
- Gender: Mixed
- Enrolment: 1700
- Houses: Aspen, Birch, Cedar, Hawthorn, Hazel, Maple, Pine, Willow
- Colours: Black, blue, green and gold
- Feeder schools: Netherlee Primary School, Carolside Primary & Busby Primary
- Website: williamwoodhighschool.co.uk

Williamwood High School is a non-denominational state secondary school in Clarkston, East Renfrewshire, Scotland. As of 2024, the school contained 1678 pupils out of a capacity of 1710, making it one of the biggest state schools in Scotland.

== History ==
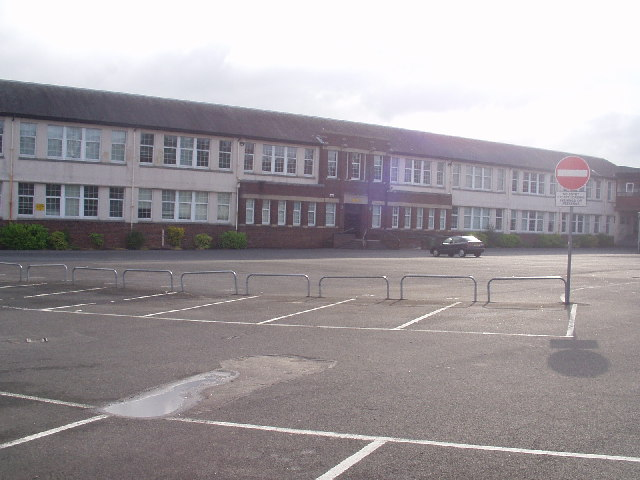
The old Williamwood High School in 2005

The school was originally opened as Eastwood Senior Secondary School in Seres Road, Williamwood in the 1930s, later being renamed Williamwood High School. It was announced in 2003/2004 that a new school would be built to replace the ageing facilities at Seres Road. It was funded under the PPP scheme by the private company HBG.

In August 2006 the new £29 million school opened at the Eaglesham Road site, on the southern edge of Clarkston, with fields and farm roads to the south, west and north, about 1.5 miles from the original site. It features over 70 classrooms, each fitted with interactive whiteboards. The school has high quality sports facilities including astroturf pitches and running track, a video editing suite, and high standard drama studios. The new school was officially opened by the First Minister of Scotland, Jack McConnell, on Monday 11 December 2006.

Following an inspection in 2009, Williamwood became the first school in Scotland to be awarded a maximum of five "excellent" ratings by Her Majesty's Inspectorate of Education.

The unoccupied former building was damaged by fire in February 2007. Within around a year of this, the school was demolished, and townhouses were built on the old site. The former playing fields were redeveloped into the Eastwood Health Centre, alongside the old Isobel Mair School building. Some parts of the playing fields remain brownfield, however. Former headteacher John Fitzpatrick was awarded the OBE in 2011 for services to education, whilst at Williamwood.

In April 2015, the S6 year group from the school went viral on the internet after filming a video of themselves and various staff members miming to the song Uptown Funk by Bruno Mars and Mark Ronson. The video was made to be shown at their end of year graduation but amassed over one hundred thousand views after being posted online.

In June 2015, following the retirement of John Fitzpatrick, William Inglis became headteacher.

In 2021, Nicola MacGlashan took over as headteacher, having previously been the headteacher at nearby Woodfarm High School. Soon after the appointment, the school implemented a controversial new rule that toilets were to be locked during class time to prevent truancy. This prompted backlash amongst the school community, with an online petition set up to oppose the decision. The school later reversed the rule in view of the negative response.

In 2024, the school faced backlash after replacing the traditional roles of head boy and head girl with two gender-neutral captains. The change aimed to promote inclusivity, but it led to controversy when a boy was appointed to one of the captain roles, meaning for the first time, there were two boys as leaders, replacing the former head girl. Critics argue that the move undermines female representation, while supporters believe it is a step towards gender equality. The school's decision has sparked a broader debate on gender roles in educational leadership.

== Departments ==
Williamwood High School Badge

The subject areas at Williamwood are separated into different departments. Each department has a principal teacher who has overall management responsibility and leads the learning and teaching. The departments are:

- Art & Design
- Business & Computing
- Design, Technology & Architecture
- English
- Food & Technology Textile
- Mathematics
- Modern Languages
- Performing Arts
- Physical Education
- Pupil Support
- RMPS
- Science
- Social Subjects

== Curriculum ==
Williamwood follows the Curriculum for Excellence, the national curriculum for schools in Scotland. In the senior phase (S4-S6) students study for SQA qualifications starting at National 1–5 in S4, progressing to Highers and Advanced Highers in S5 & S6 respectively.

== Associated Primary Schools and Nurseries ==
=== Primary Schools ===
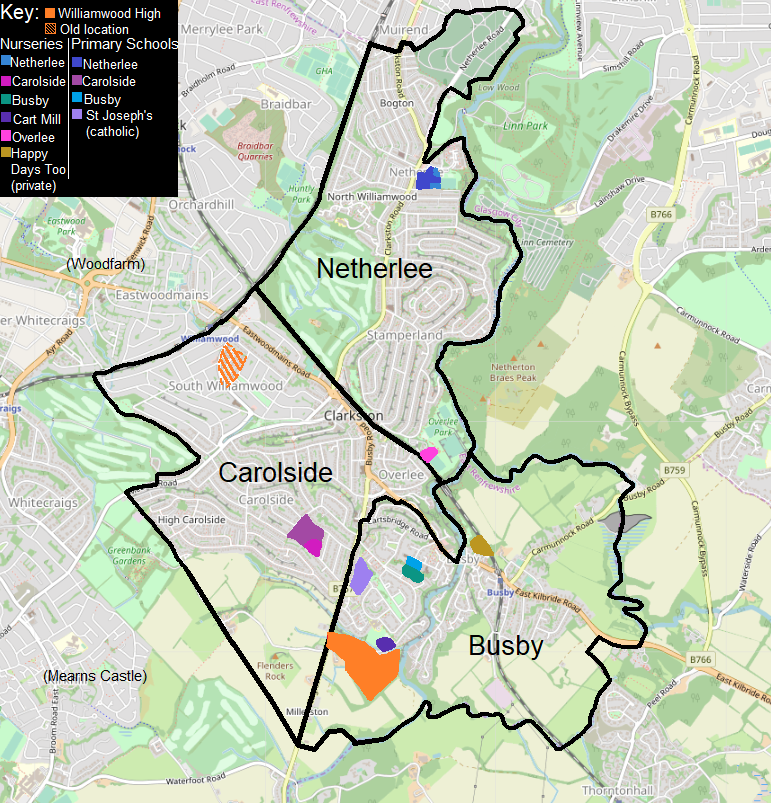
Map of catchment areas for Williamwood and associated schools

Netherlee Primary School is located in Netherlee, which is Clarkston's neighbour. Netherlee also has nursery facilities in buildings called the "Saplings" and "Acorns" buildings. The catchment for Netherlee Primary also includes the Stamperland area of Clarkston.

Carolside Primary School is located in the Carolside area. It also has nursery facilities, some of which are currently being extended (as of March 2020). Its catchment covers the large Carolside and South Williamwood areas, as well as the small area of Overlee (not to be confused with the Stamperland park of the same name), as well as most of Clarkston's town centre.

Busby Primary School is located in the village of Busby, next to Clarkston. A nursery is also currently under construction at this location. The catchment mostly covers the village of Busby, however small parts of Clarkston, including the Williamwood High School itself, are in the catchment for Busby.

St Joseph's Primary School, located in Busby, shares Williamwood's catchment area, but is a Catholic school, and students from this school normally attend St Ninian's High School.

== Notable alumni ==
- Aidan Connolly (born 1995), professional footballer
- Joe Thomson (footballer) (born 1997), professional footballer.
- Richard Lochhead (born 1969), SNP MSP for North East Scotland 1999–2004, for Moray 2006–present
- Euan Murray (born 1980), Scotland international rugby union player
- Michael Oakley (born 1982), producer and musician
- Eubha Akilade (born 1998), actress, writer, and director
