= Crossing Souls =

2018 video game

- Developer: Fourattic
- Publisher: Devolver Digital
- Designers: Juan Diego Vázquez; Daniel Benítez; Juan Gabriel Jaén
- Programmers: Juan Diego Vázquez; Alfonso Cueto; Fernando de Luna
- Artists: Daniel Benítez; Juan Gabriel Jaén
- Composers: Chris Köbke; Timecop1983
- Engine: Unity
- Platforms: Microsoft Windows, macOS, Linux, PlayStation 4, Nintendo Switch
- Release: 13 February 2018; Nintendo Switch; 26 July 2018
- Genre: Action-adventure
- Mode: Single-player

Crossing Souls is a 2018 action-adventure video game developed by Spanish studio Fourattic and published by Devolver Digital. The game was released on 13 February 2018 for Microsoft Windows, macOS, Linux PlayStation 4 and 26 July 2018 on Nintendo Switch. Game centers around group of friends, who discover a mysterious pink stone that allows them to travel between two realms, leading them into an adventure involving a government conspiracy. Player controls five kids with special skills while fighting and solving puzzles.

== Plot ==
In 1986 in Tajunga, California, five teenage friends, baseball fan Chris, his younger, obnoxious brother Kevin, bookworm inventor Matt, gold hearted muscle Big Joe and tomboy Charlie, discover a corpse of McKittrick near the town's river with a Duat Stone. Taking the stone home and driven by curiosity, Matt is able to build a device with which the friends are able to unlock and control the stone's power. Though the friends do not fully understand the artifact's power, they find out that it allows them to see and interact with the spirits of the dead. However, said stone also drains the life source of those who hold it. This gets Kevin tragically killed when they run into street gang leader, Quincy Queen, who steals the stone.

After the funeral and several days of mourning, the four friends steal back the stone and use it to talk with Kevin's spirit. They also meet the ghost of McKittrick, who reveals that he used to work for former U.S. Army general Major Oh Russ, who had organized the Duat Stone's recovery and thus use it to control the deceased to accomplish his world invasion plan. McKittrick rebelled and stole the Duat stone.

Tajunga gets quarantine lockdown over a government conspiracy involving contagious disease as a cover up operation. The four friends escape, only to fall off the road into the dark forest, where they encounter a military camp of ghost children deceived by an evil ghost. After liberating the ghost children, the four friends return to the Tajunga to save their families and friends, but Oh Russ has already captured them. The friends escape through a river into the cavern, but Big Joe gets mortally wounded and eventually dies. The surviving trio discovers inside the cavern hieroglyphs, which seems to imply the Duat Stone was an artifact of the gods.

After getting out of the cavern and dealing with the ghosts of the old west, Major Oh Russ catches up to them, steals the Duat Stone and kidnaps Charlie. Matt and Chris give chase and infiltrate Oh Russ’ headquarters where they encounter Osis, the Egyptian god of balance, who reveals Oh Russ is the servant of the Egyptian god of destruction Seth who usurped his brother Osis' position as the Keeper of the Living Balance. The boys also learn Oh Russ is using their families and friends as an energy source to power up the Duat Stone. While they manage to defeat Oh Russ and rescue Charlie, Matt dies. Charlie and Chris share a final kiss before Charlie escapes with all of the townsfolk while Chris stays behind, activates the interdimensional portal and destroys Seth with his soul, thus saving everyone at the cost of his own life.

In the epilogue, Charlie, having grown old, tells the events of the game as a story to her grandchildren. After they leave, Charlie, wanting to return to her friends, is finally able to activate a machine she has been working on based on Matt's discoveries, which sends her soul to the afterlife as the girl she was back then, and reunites with her childhood friends.

== Development ==
Crossing Souls' storyline was largely influenced by those of the films The Goonies, E.T. the Extra-Terrestrial and Super 8, while the level design and the orthogonal view were adapted from the original The Legend of Zelda, with the animation style of the cutscenes having been inspired by Teen Wolf, Saint Seiya, He-Man and the Masters of the Universe and Teenage Mutant Ninja Turtles, all of which are items of the 1980s. Development on the game started in January 2014, after the final update for Fourattic's previous game, Bin This Pic: Guess the Wrong One (or Odd Pic Out), was released. The pre-production was first presented to the public through the TIGSource forums on 5 February 2014. In the forums, it was met with a positive reception, thus, development was continued and team members regularly posted development updates. Around March 2014, the team was running out of money, wherefore the development on the game was halted, enabling the team to create Pixel Puzzle Mania, a free-to-play puzzle video game for iOS, published by Genera Games, which was released on 29 August 2014. In August 2014, Fourattic partnered with Devolver Digital for a publishing deal on Crossing Souls. On 17 November 2014, the game was brought to Kickstarter, aiming for US$45,000. Devolver Digital announced that they would publish it, regardless if, and how far, the project would get funded. Crossing Souls was successfully funded on 13 December 2014, and the campaign ended on 17 December 2014 with a total of US$51,983 raised. In January 2015, using the funds raised from Kickstarter, Fourattic moved from their original attic location to a new office in Sevilla, Spain and rebooted development on the game. A first demo of Crossing Souls was shown off at E3 2015, from 16 to 18 June 2015, and at Gamelab Barcelona 2015, from 24 to 26 June 2015. As announced in December 2017, the game will be released on 13 February 2018. Devolver Digital announced the game was releasing on Nintendo Switch on 26 July 2018 as part of Devolver Digital's 'Summer of Devolver'.

== Reception ==
Reception

Aggregate score
Aggregator	Score
Metacritic	(PC) 70/100 (PS4) 75/100 (NS) 67/100

Review scores
Publication	Score
Game Informer	9/10
GameSpot	6/10
Nintendo Life	7/10
PC Gamer (US)	62/100

Crossing Souls received "generally favourable reviews" for the PlayStation 4 version, while the Windows and Nintendo Switch versions were met with "mixed or average" reviews, according to review aggregator Metacritic.
