= Stamperland =

Coordinates: 55.795°N 4.269°W

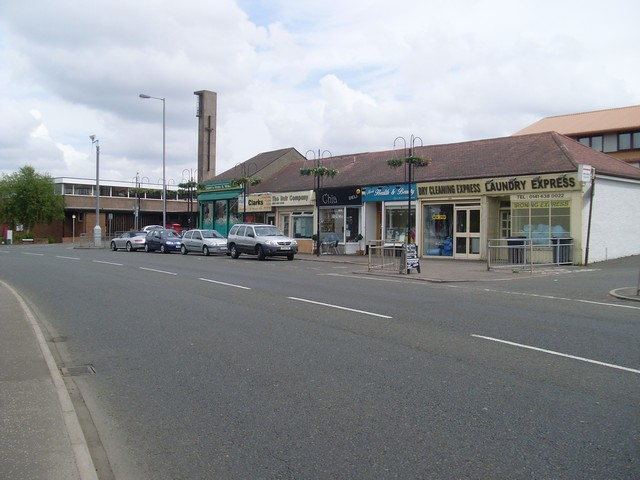
- Shops on Clarkston Road, with the former Stamperland Church in the background

- Location within East Renfrewshire Stamperland (East Renfrewshire)
- Population: 3,630 (2020)
  - Edinburgh: 70 km
  - London: 549.31 km
- Community council: Netherlee and Stamperland
- Council area: East Renfrewshire
- Lieutenancy area: Renfrewshire
- Country: Scotland
- Sovereign state: United Kingdom
- Post town: GLASGOW
- Postcode district: G76
- Dialling code: 0141
- Police: Scotland
- Fire: Scottish
- Ambulance: Scottish
- UK Parliament: East Renfrewshire
- Scottish Parliament: Eastwood

Stamperland is an area of Clarkston in East Renfrewshire, Scotland. Part of the Greater Glasgow conurbation, it is situated on the west bank of the White Cart Water about 4 1/2 miles (7 kilometres) south of Glasgow city centre, and just outside the city boundary.

== Location and demography ==
Stamperland is an area of Clarkston, to the south of Glasgow. Adjacent places are Netherlee to the north and the rest of Clarkston to the south. It is bordered by Clarkston Road to the west, the railway to the south and the White Cart Water to the east. It is served by the Glasgow Central to East Kilbride line through Clarkston railway station at the south of the area. Also somewhat nearby are Muirend and Williamwood stations on the Neilston branch of the Cathcart Circle, respectively located north and south-west of Stamperland.

The area is mainly housing dating from the 1920s and early 1930s, previously farmland under the farms of Stamperland (around The Oval today), Slamanshill (around Stamperland Avenue) and Overlee, which still exists today in the Overlee Park. but there is a small group of local shops located at the junction of Clarkston Road, Stamperland Crescent and Stamperland Gardens. Also at this location is the former Stamperland Parish Church (Church of Scotland). Other local facilities include a social club, bowling and tennis clubs. The area also contains the large Overlee Park, which is home to multiple football pitches, and a large children's playground.

For census purposes, Stamperland is classified as a separate locality within the settlement of Greater Glasgow, within the East Renfrewshire council area; however, for most other purposes it is considered to be a part of the town of Clarkston. The most recent estimate, from mid-2012, gives a population of 3,610.

== Landmarks ==
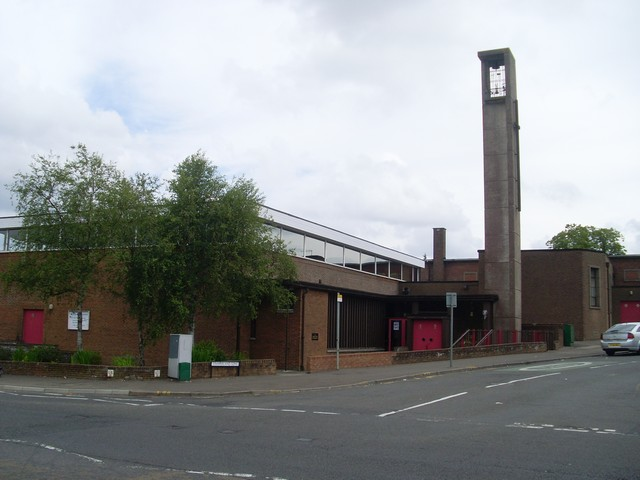
Stamperland Church in 2009

The Clarkston Community Centre is a mosque in the area. The building was formerly the Stamperland Parish Church between 1941 and 2022, a modern-style church building with a concrete bell tower. Parts of the church building were built in 1941. Services had previously been held in temporary accommodation between the founding of the congregation in 1940 and the construction of the sanctuary area in 1964. The congregation merged with the nearby Netherlee Parish Church in 2020 and the combined congregation voted 77% to 19% to permanently close and sell Stamperland Church on 20 February 2022. The final service took place on 26 June 2022.

Overlee Playing Fields is a park situated on Moray Drive in the southeast of the neighbourhood. The park is steep, like much of Stamperland, with many cliffs. It contains four football pitches. In the early 1800s, the remains of a village of underground dwellings (souterrains or weems) from around 2000 years earlier was uncovered by the local landowner preparing the ground for use as a quarry, but its significance was not recognised and the evidence was destroyed. The park's pavilion was abandoned for around five years after large amounts of bats made their home there. The local authority in 2018 announced plans for a replacement building (including a small nursery and a house for the bats) that would be built on an adjacent site. The new building was built, and opened in 2021, and the pavilion was demolished.
