= Michael Oakley =

Scottish musician and producer (born 1982)

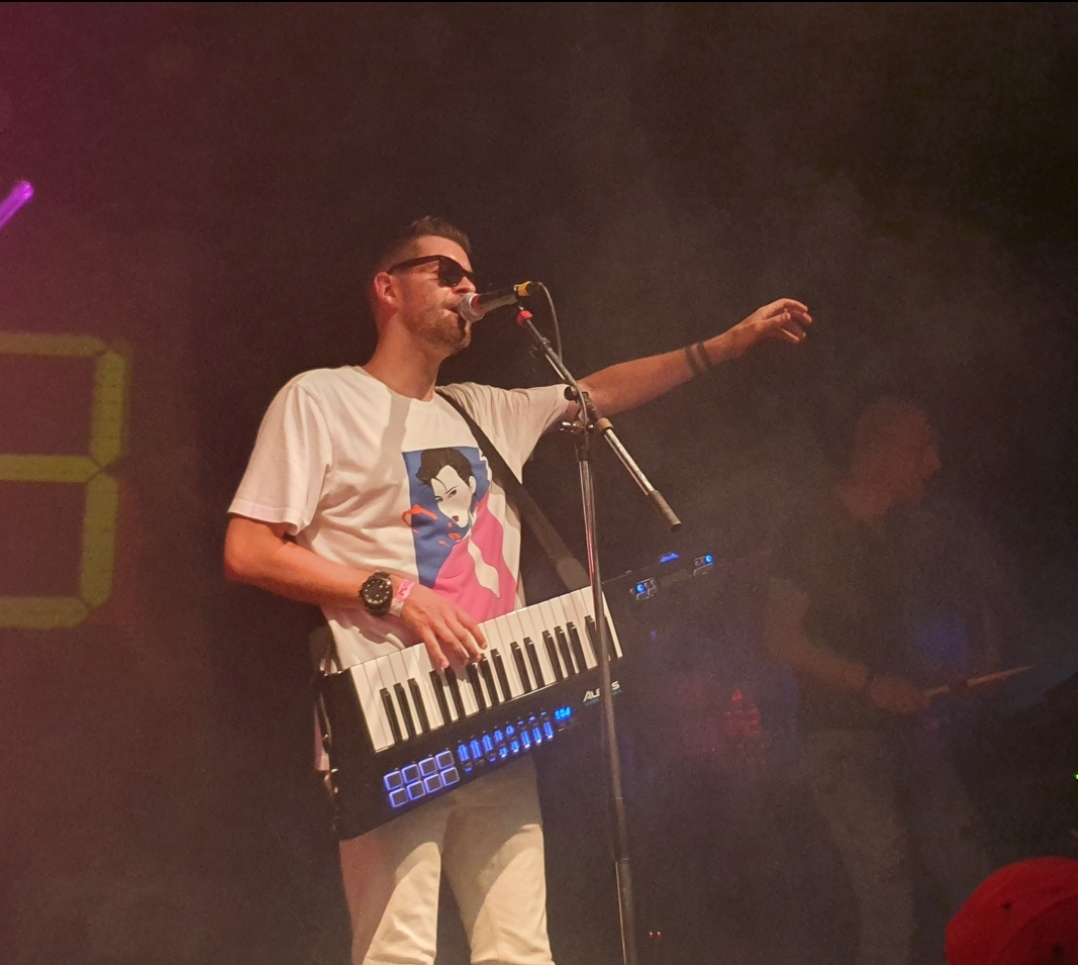
- Oakley performing in 2019

Background information
- Born: Michael James Oakley; 3 January 1982 (age 44); Glasgow, Scotland
- Genres: Synthwave; synthpop
- Occupations: Musician; music producer
- Years active: 2016–present
- Labels: NewRetroWave; TimeSlave
- Website: michael-oakley.com

Michael James Oakley (born 3 January 1982) is a Scottish synthwave producer and musician.

== Early life ==
Oakley was born in Glasgow but moved to Los Angeles in 2016, before settling in Canada in 2018. He attended Williamwood High School in Clarkston, East Renfrewshire. He is a self-taught musician, having taken piano lessons for a short period in his youth.

== Career ==
Having worked in Glasgow's cover band scene for some years, Oakley penned what would become his debut EP, California, in 2016. Lesley Daunt of The Huffington Post wrote in 2017 of the lead single "Turn Back Time", "Oakley's captivating beats and celestial synthesizers have given a fresh approach and revival to classic pop".

In 2017, Oakley released California to critical acclaim from The Huffington Post and popular YouTube channel and record label NewRetroWave.

In 2019, the artist released his debut full-length album, Introspect, which was listed in NewRetroWave's Top 10 albums list of 2019.

In 2020, Oakley issued the track "Wake Up!", featuring Ollie Wride, as part of the soundtrack to the game Wave Break: High Tides, through Funktronic Labs. In the same year, he contributed an instrumental remix of his 2016 single "Rabbit in the Headlights" to the soundtrack of the mobile game Retro Drive.

On 16 April 2021, Oakley announced the release of a new single, "Is There Anybody Out There", co-written by fellow labelmate Ollie Wride and produced by Jon Campbell of The Time Frequency.

Oakley released his second studio album, Odyssey, on 14 May 2021, through NewRetroWave Records. Callum Crumlish of Daily Express wrote, "The glowing eight-track record oozes style and electronica while managing to steer clear of the cliched building blocks of the genre".

His third album, Prologue, was released in May 2026, and preceded by the single "World of Promises".

Oakley has designed sound packs for the Reason software and a patch collection for Roland's Juno-60 synthesizer.

== Life-saving incident ==
In 2012, while returning from a performance at a wedding function near Glasgow, Oakley rescued two men from a burning car.

== Discography ==
=== Studio albums ===
Title	Details
California (The Remixes)	Released: 18 March 2018; Label: Independent; Formats: Digital download
Introspect	Released: 8 March 2019; Label: NewRetroWave; Formats: Cassette, CD, digital download, vinyl
Introspect (The Instrumentals)	Released: 29 March 2019; Label: NewRetroWave; Formats: Digital download
Odyssey	Released: 14 May 2021; Label: NewRetroWave; Formats: Cassette, CD, digital download, MiniDisc, vinyl
Introspect (The Remixes)	Released: 18 March 2022; Label: Independent; Formats: Digital download
Prologue	Released: 29 May 2026; Label: NewRetroWave; Formats: Formats: Cassette, CD, digital download, vinyl

=== EPs ===
Title	Details
California	Released: 6 October 2017; Label: Timeslave Recordings; Formats: CD, Digital download, vinyl
Four	Released: 19 January 2022; Label: Independent; Format: Digital download

=== Singles ===
==== As lead artist ====
Title	Album	
"Rabbit in the Headlights"	2016	California
"Turn Back Time"	2016	California
"Control"	2018	Introspect
"Now I'm Alive" (featuring Dana Jean Phoenix)	2019	Introspect
"Wake Up!" (featuring Ollie Wride)	2020	Wave Break: High Tides (Game Soundtrack)
"Is There Anybody Out There" (Jon Campbell Radio Edit)	2021	Odyssey
"Glasgow Song" (featuring Dana Jean Phoenix)	2021	Odyssey
"World of Promises"	2026	Prologue
"Falling Skyward"	2026	Prologue

==== As featured artist ====
Title	Year	Album
"We Are the Dreamers" (Elevate the Sky featuring Michael Oakley)	2022	We Are the Dreamers

=== Remixes ===
Year	Artist	Song
2018	Scandroid	"Afterglow"
2019	Missing Words	"Break These Chains"
2019	Scandroid	"Euphoria"
