= Netherlee =

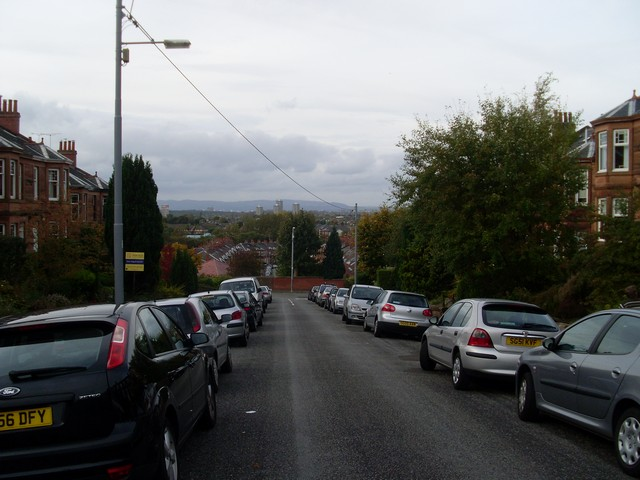
- Ormonde Crescent, with a view towards Glasgow and the Campsie Fells in the distance

- Location within East Renfrewshire Netherlee (East Renfrewshire)
- Population: 4,530 (2020)
- OS grid reference: NS575585
  - Edinburgh: 43 mi (69 km) ENE
  - London: 342 mi (550 km) SSE
- Community council: Netherlee and Stamperland
- Council area: East Renfrewshire
- Lieutenancy area: Renfrewshire
- Country: Scotland
- Sovereign state: United Kingdom
- Post town: GLASGOW
- Postcode district: G44
- Dialling code: 0141
- Police: Scotland
- Fire: Scottish
- Ambulance: Scottish
- UK Parliament: East Renfrewshire
- Scottish Parliament: Eastwood

Netherlee is an area of East Renfrewshire, Scotland. It is situated on the west bank of the White Cart Water about 4 miles (6.5 km) south of Glasgow city centre. Part of the Greater Glasgow conurbation, it is mostly contiguous with the city, and is just beyond the boundary of its local authority area. It is a separate census locality from Glasgow, like other areas such as neighbouring Giffnock and Clarkston. Netherlee is directly contiguous with Stamperland. It is also in a council ward with Clarkston and its neighbour Busby. As of 2012, Netherlee has a population of 4,550.

Originally a small rural hamlet dependent upon the mills along the river, Netherlee became extensively urbanised in the 20th century, developing into an affluent commuter suburb. The area is served by a parish church, primary school and library, as well as a number of local shops and parks. Cathcart Cemetery also falls within the boundaries of Netherlee.

== History ==
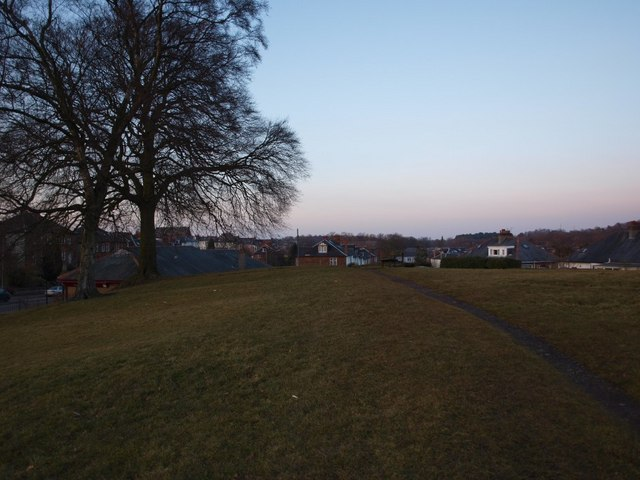
The hill where Lee Castle was located

In the medieval era, the area of modern Netherlee and Clarkston was known as the Lands of Lee, centred on Lee Castle. The small hill on which the castle stood is now the small park behind Netherlee Post Office. In the 15th century, the Lands of Lee were split up into Netherlee, and Midlee (now Stamperland) and Overlee (both now part of neighbouring Clarkston). From the 1660s onwards, the Maxwell family of Bogton, (which extended into modern Muirend) developed the original Williamwood House and the surrounding Williamwood Estate. The house was built adjacent to the site of Lee Castle, the latter being demolished around this time.

The original hamlet of Netherlee developed in connection with a paper mill which was opened on the western bank of the White Cart Water around 1700. Towards the end of the 18th century, the Netherlee House mansion was built by one of the mill's owners, John Muir. By the 1790s, Netherlee had expanded from the riverside to a new village centre on the main road from Glasgow to Kilmarnock (now the location of MacLaren Place). In the 1830s the mill became a calico printworks, which provided the main source of employment in the area until the 1880s.

The early years of the 20th century saw the first phase of urbanisation. New housing developments, typically red sandstone terraces, began to eat up former agricultural land. Due to building restrictions as a result of the First World War, however, it was not until the 1920s that the majority of residential streets off the main artery were fully developed as they appear today. Netherlee in the mid-1930s was mostly as it is today, with the construction of the parish church, primary school and the MacLaren Place building.

== Governance ==
Netherlee is in East Renfrewshire, one of the 32 council areas of Scotland for local government purposes. East Renfrewshire Council, the unitary local council, is based in nearby Giffnock and is responsible for local government. For local electoral purposes, Netherlee was formerly a ward electing a single councillor to East Renfrewshire Council, but is now grouped with Clarkston and Busby as a larger multi-member ward electing three councillors. Netherlee and Stamperland together form one of East Renfrewshire's designated community council areas, but following the dissolution of the previous community council in 2015 there were insufficient nominations for it to be re-established at that time.

The Netherlee area has been part of the historic county of Renfrewshire since medieval times. From 1890 onwards, Renfrewshire was an area of local government administered by a county council. Although Renfrewshire ceased to be used for local government purposes in 1975, it continues to exist as both a Lieutenancy area and registration county. Netherlee is also within the ancient parish of Cathcart, which formed the lowest tier of local government between 1845 and 1930, and which continues to exist for some statistical purposes. Between 1930 and 1975, Netherlee was within the First Landward District of Renfrewshire.

Following the abolition of administrative counties in 1975, Netherlee became a part of the new Eastwood District within Strathclyde Region under the two tier system of local government which lasted until the creation of the present unitary authorities in 1996.

In the Parliament of the United Kingdom, Netherlee is represented in the House of Commons as part of the county constituency of East Renfrewshire. Kirsten Oswald of the Scottish National Party was first elected as MP for East Renfrewshire in the 2015 General Election. For the Scottish Parliament, Netherlee forms part of the Eastwood constituency within the West of Scotland electoral region. As such it is currently represented by Jackson Carlaw of the Scottish Conservative Party as the constituency Member of the Scottish Parliament (MSP) in addition to the seven regional list MSPs.

== Geography ==
At 55°48′7″N 4°16′12″W, Netherlee is in Scotland's Central Lowlands. The community is 175 feet (53 m) above sea level, 4.2 miles (6.8 km) northwest of East Kilbride, 4.4 miles (7.1 km) south of Glasgow and 5 miles (8.0 km) east of Barrhead. The area is contiguous with the city of Glasgow and forms part of the Greater Glasgow conurbation. It lies on the west bank of the White Cart Water, a tributary of the River Clyde.

== Demography ==
For census purposes, Netherlee is classed as a locality within the settlement of Greater Glasgow. According to the United Kingdom Census 2011, Netherlee had a total resident population of 4,562. The population is 88% White Scottish, with white people as a whole making up 97.1% of the total. 2.4% are Asian with 0.5% from other ethnic backgrounds. 62.2% of the population identified as Christian (38.8% Church of Scotland, 19.7% Roman Catholic and 3.7% other Christian denominations), with 28.9% stating they had no religion.

The most recent estimate, from mid-2012, suggests the population of Netherlee has decreased very slightly to 4,550.

In a 2014 Royal Mail survey, the G44 postcode – which includes Netherlee – was rated as the most desirable area of Scotland to live in. Statistics from the 2020 Scottish Index of Multiple Deprivation ranks Netherlee as one of the ten least deprived areas in Scotland.

== Culture and community ==
Netherlee Library is operated by East Renfrewshire Culture and Leisure, a charity partially funded by East Renfrewshire Council.

== Landmarks ==
MacLaren Place is a Category B listed building on Clarkston Road. A long three-storey tenement building with shops on the ground floor, its design combines traditional Glasgow tenement stylings with contemporary art deco details. Designed by Glasgow architect Andrew Wilson, it was built in 1935 for local landowner John MacLaren Lochead (who lived in the now-demolished Netherlee House) and replaced an earlier cottage-style tenement row.

Netherlee Parish Church on Ormonde Avenue is also Category B listed. Built in 1933 by architects Stewart and Paterson, it was probably the last stone church built in the Glasgow area.

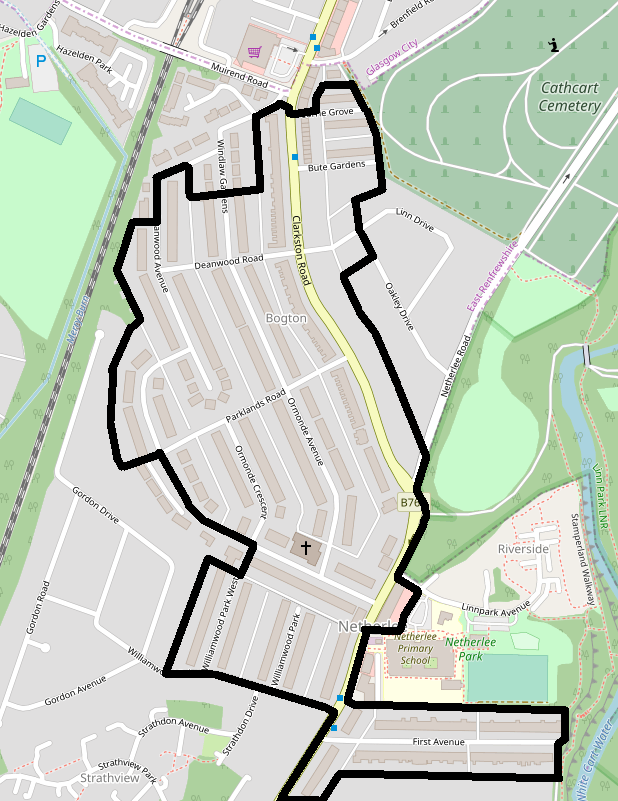
Boundaries of the Netherlee conservation area

The north part of Netherlee (referred to as Bogton on some maps) as well as First Avenue and small areas around North Williamwood were made a conservation area in 2019. They were classed as an article 2 protection area up until that point, which gave it the majority of the protections of a conservation area anyway.

== Education ==
There is one non-denominational primary school in the area, Netherlee Primary School, opened in 1933 to serve the growing population. It was extensively modernised and expanded in the 1990s. In December 2005 it became the first school in Scotland to achieve a top-level "excellent" rating following inspection by Her Majesty's Inspectorate of Education. It acts as a feeder for Williamwood High School in neighbouring Clarkston.

== Notable people ==
Former Rangers and Scotland footballer Bob McPhail lived in Netherlee in retirement, until his death in 2000.

Scottish folk singer Alastair McDonald lives in Netherlee.

Olympic athlete Lee McConnell moved to Netherlee in 2013.
