= Euan Murray =

British Lions & Scotland international rugby union footballer

- Born: Euan Alistair Murray; 7 August 1980 (age 46) Glasgow, Scotland
- Height: 1.85 m (6 ft 1 in)
- Weight: 118 kg (18 st 8 lb; 260 lb)
- School: Williamwood High School

Rugby union career
- Position: Prop
Amateur team(s)
Years	Team	Apps	(Points)
- Glasgow Southern
–	Glasgow Thistles		
Senior career
Years	Team	Apps	(Points)
1999–2007	Glasgow Warriors	36	(5)
2007–2010	Northampton Saints	61	(10)
2010–2012	Newcastle Falcons	31	(0)
2012	Agen	8	(0)
2012–2014	Worcester Warriors	28	(0)
2014−2015	Glasgow Warriors	13	(0)
2015	Pau		(0)
- Correct as of 9 January 2015
International career
Years	Team	Apps	(Points)
2005–2015	Scotland	66	(10)
2009	British & Irish Lions		
- Correct as of 21 March 2015

Euan Murray (born 7 August 1980) is a retired Scottish rugby union footballer, whose last club was Pau in the French Top 14.

He started his career with Glasgow Warriors before playing for a number of clubs, including Northampton Saints, Newcastle Falcons and Worcester Warriors. He also played for the Scotland national team. His usual position was tighthead prop and he was known as a strong scrummager.

== Career ==
=== Club ===
Murray played most of his club rugby with Glasgow Southern (now known as GHA after amalgamation with Hutchesons' Aloysians) before he went on to join Glasgow Hawks and then a professional contract with Glasgow Warriors. He was named in the Pro12 Dream Team at the end of the 2006/07 season.

Murray joined Northampton Saints in 2007. In December 2010, it was announced that Murray would be leaving Northampton by mutual consent and with immediate effect. He subsequently joined Newcastle Falcons.

On 4 October 2012 Worcester Warriors announced that Murray would be joining them effective from November 2012. During the 2013/14 season, Murray seriously injured his thumb in a freak accident during a team-building exercise at Sixways.

He rejoined Glasgow Warriors in June 2014 on a one-year contract.

In June 2015, it was announced that Murray had signed a two-year contract with Pau in France.

=== International ===
In 1998 he played for Scotland under-18, and the following year he enjoyed a victory against England in the IRB Junior World Championship match at Pontypridd, Wales. Subsequently, between 1999 and 2001, he was capped 13 times in under-21 internationals.

His senior Scotland career began with his debut against Romania in Bucharest in 2005.

He was a part of their 2007 Six Nations squad, and scored a try in their final game against France. Murray was picked for the Lions tour to South Africa in 2009. He was one of only 2 Scottish players originally selected, the other being Nathan Hines. Scotland captain Mike Blair and fellow front rower Ross Ford were later called up as replacements.

Murray retired from international rugby in May 2015, 4 months prior to the RWC, citing the close timing of the tournament with his wife expecting their third child. He amassed 66 caps for Scotland, and retired as Scotland's most capped tighthead prop. Murray also was on the Lions tour to South Africa in 2009 and played in four warm up games but had to withdraw from the tour ahead of the Test matches due to an ankle injury.

== Personal life ==
In 2009, he announced he would no longer be playing on Sundays, out of his commitment to the Christian Sabbath, prompting comparisons to Eric Liddell.

Murray was educated at Williamwood High School in Clarkston, East Renfrewshire. He is a qualified vet.
