= Timecop1983 =

Dutch electronic musician (born 1983)

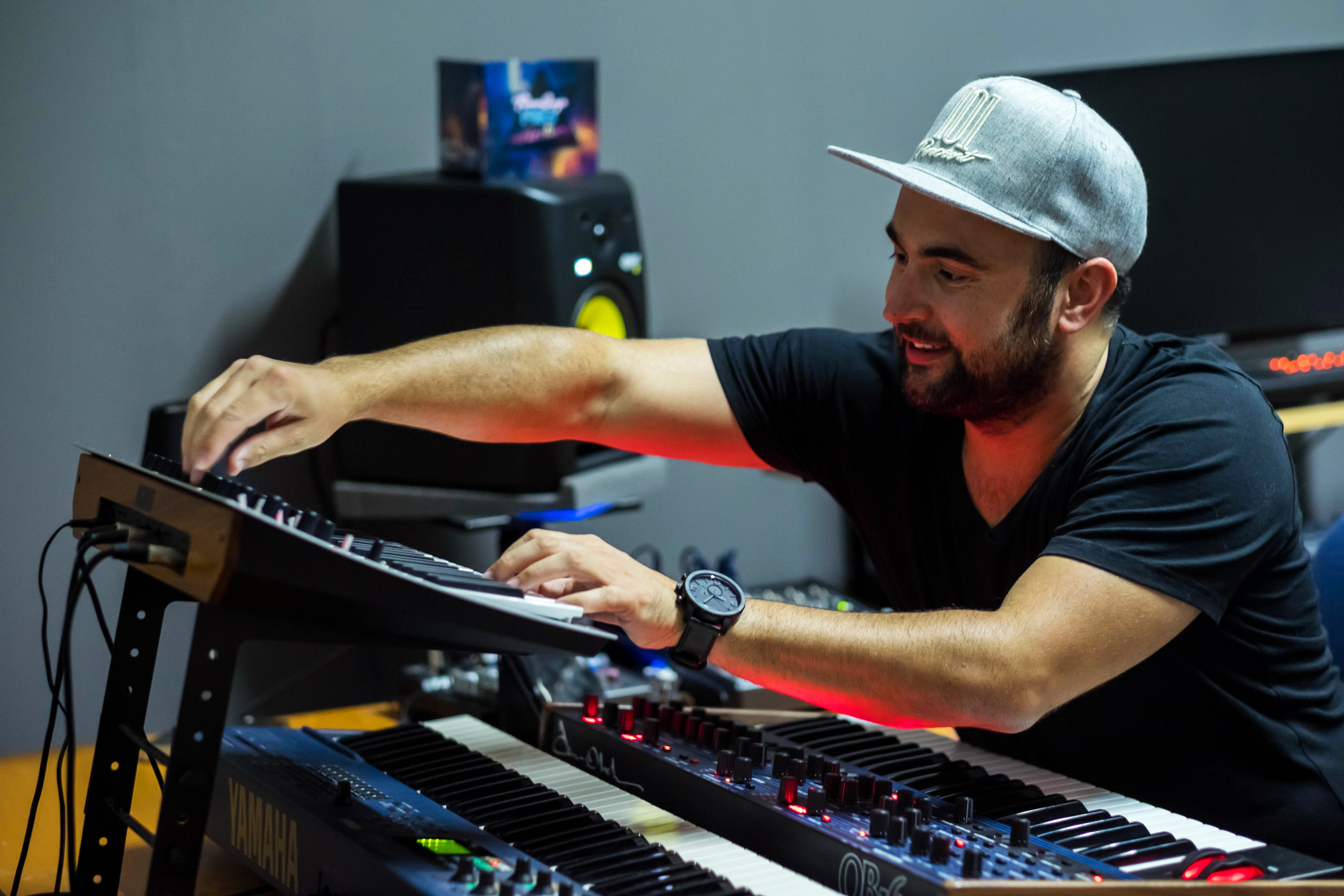
- Leenaerts in 2016

Background information
- Also known as: Yourdee
- Born: Jordy Leenaerts; 24 August 1983 (age 42); Nuenen, North Brabant, Netherlands
- Origin: Eindhoven, Netherlands
- Genres: Synthwave; electronic
- Occupations: Musician; record producer
- Years active: 2014–present
- Labels: Urban Road; NewRetroWave; TimeSlave
- Website: timecop1983.com

Jordy Leenaerts (Dutch pronunciation: [ˈjɔrdi ˈleːnaːrts]; born 24 August 1983), better known by the stage name Timecop1983, is a Dutch electronic musician from Eindhoven, producing music in the synthwave genre. His debut album, Childhood Memories, was released in 2014, and it was followed by Journeys the same year. He issued Reflections in 2015, Night Drive in 2018, Faded Touch in 2021, and Searching for Tomorrow in 2023. Leenaerts explained in an interview that his stage name came about as a combination of Futurecop! and his year of birth.

== Career ==
Leenaerts started making music at the age of 12 on his computer with a music tracker. Influenced by musicians like Mitch Murder and the synthwave soundtrack to the 2011 film Drive, he took on the moniker Timecop1983 and began making music in 2014. In a 2016 interview, Leenaerts said he wanted to create a nostalgic wistfulness with his music, reminiscent of the 1980s, combined with dream pop elements and melancholic songwriting. Also in 2016, Leenaerts launched the side project Division, releasing the EP 2083.

Timecop1983 contributed music to the 2018 video game Crossing Souls, together with Chris Köbke. That year, he toured across fourteen American states along with Aeron Rings and Korine.

Timecop1983's song "It Was Only a Dream" is featured on the soundtrack for the Starz crime drama film The Last Deal.

== Personal life ==
When not making music, Leenaerts works at the customer service center for the municipality of Eindhoven, where he lives.

== Discography ==
=== Timecop1983 ===
Studio albums

- Childhood Memories (2014)
- Journeys (2014)
- Reflections (2015)
- Night Drive (2018)
- Night Drive (Instrumental Edition) (2018)
- Faded Touch (2021)
- Searching for Tomorrow (2023)

EPs

- Synthetic Romance (2014)
- Waves (2014)
- Lovers, Part 1 (2016)
- Running in the Dark (2016)
- Lovers, Part 2 (2017)
- Multiverse (2022)
- Metropolis (2024)

Soundtrack albums

- Crossing Souls Original Soundtrack (2018)

Remixes

- "Midnight Chase (Timecop1983 Remix)" – Tokyo Rose (2018)
- "Arcade Dreams (Timecop1983 Remix)" – The Midnight (2019)

Singles

- "Lonely Nights" (2013)
- "Daydreaming" (2014)
- "Our Time" with Femmepop (2014)
- "Mercury" from Crossing Souls (2014)
- "Don't Let Go" feat. Dana Jean Phoenix (2015)
- "Back to You" (2018)
- "My Room" feat. Oscar (2018)
- "Faded Memory" Jessie Frye feat. Timecop1983 (2018)
- "My Delorean" with Primo the Alien (2019)
- "Falling" feat. Josh Dally (2020)
- "One Night" feat. Josh Dally (2021)
- "Sparks" with Waves_On_Waves (2022)
- "Dangerous" with Waves_On_Waves (2022)
- "Blue" with Waves_On_Waves (2022)
- "The Quiet Night" with Waves_On_Waves (2022)
- "LA Late at Night" with Waves_On_Waves (2022)
- "On the Run" with Waves_On_Waves (2022)
- "The Hackernaut" Neontenic feat. Timecop1983 (2022)
- "Take Me Back" with Josh Dally (2022)
- "Love Game" (2023)
- "Read My Mind" with Josh Dally (2023)
- "Lifeline" with Josh Dally (2024)
- "Am I Coming Through" with Josh Dally (2025)
- "Before the Lights Went Out" with Josh Dally (2025)
- "Neverending" (2025)

=== Division ===
EP

- 2083 (2016)
